= Territory of the Islamic State – West Africa Province =

West Africa Province ولاية غرب إفريقية Wilāyat Garb Ifrīqīyā
- Province of the Islamic State
- Flag Emblem
- Motto: لَا إِلَٰهَ إِلَّا ٱللَّٰهُ، مُحَمَّدٌ رَسُولُ ٱللَّٰهِ lā ʾilāha ʾillā -llāh, muḥammadun rasūlu llāh "There is no deity but God, Muhammad is the messenger of God."
- Anthem: أُمَّتِي قَدْ لَاحَ فَجْرٌ (Arabic); Ummatī qad la-hā fajrūn "My Ummah, Dawn Has Appeared" (de facto)
- Area of control in 2026
- Country: Islamic State
- Established: March 2015
- Religion: Sunni Islam; Christianity (Persecuted minority)
- Currency: CFA franc
- GDP: $191 Million
- Capital: Unknown (2014–January 24, 2022); Gudumbali (January 24–26, 2022); Unknown (January 26, 2022–Present)

Government
  - Type: Rival Islamist theocracy governed by a shura council
  - Body: Shura Council (Majlis al-Shura)
  - Head of Shura Council: Malam Bako; allegedly killed in October of 2021

Population
  - Estimate (2022): 800,000–3,000,000
- Time zone: UTC+01:00 (West Africa Time)

The Islamic State – West Africa Province (ISWAP), officially known as Wilāyat Garb Ifrīqīyā (West Africa Province), controls scattered territory in and around the Lake Chad Basin. Although ISWAP does not maintain full authority over all territories where it operates, it exercises stronger control in rural regions than the Nigerian government and governs an estimated 800,000–3,000,000 civilians through a combination of military presence, local administration, and taxation systems.

== Background ==
The Islamic State – West Africa Province (ISWAP) is a militant group and administrative division of the Islamic State (IS), ISWAP is primarily active in the Chad Basin, and fights an extensive insurgency against the states of Nigeria, Cameroon, Chad and Niger. It is an offshoot of Boko Haram with which it has a violent rivalry.

=== Rise and fall of Boko Haram ===
Boko Haram began to seize territory aggressively in late 2014, declaring northeast Nigeria to be a caliphate under their control. By the end of 2014, Boko Haram controlled an area roughly the size of Belgium. In March 2015, Boko Haram pledged allegiance to the Islamic State, creating the Islamic State's West Africa Province.

In August 2016, ISWAP attempted to remove Shekau from his leadership role and replace him with Abu Musab al-Barnawi. ISWAP attempted to remove Shekau because he had disobeyed Abu Bakr al-Baghdadi's order to cease targeting Muslim civilians. Shekau rejected the move, leading to a split between the groups. As of 2017, there were three factions which were all Boko Haram in origin, all rejecting Western influence, and seeking to establish an Islamic state with sharia law. These were the Islamic State West African Province (ISWAP) which is part of IS; Boko Haram, under Shekau's control; and "Ansaru which is loyal to al-Qaeda and rejected IS, however, it shares IS's disapproval of Shekau.

== Territorial control ==
As of 2022, International Crisis Group researchers estimated that 800,000 to over 3 million civilians live under ISWAP's rule. Despite not fully controlling the areas where it is present, ISWAP maintains more control over large areas in the countryside than the Nigerian government. On 24 January 2022, the small town of Gudumbali was captured and declared as ISWAP's capital. However, it was recaptured by Nigerian troops on 26 January.

=== Anti–ISWAP insurgency ===
As a result of ISWAP's attack on Boko Haram's bases in the Sambisa Forest which resulted in Abubakar Shekau killing himself, many Boko Haram fighters defected to ISWAP or fled south into Kaduna State, Nigeria. A faction of Boko Haram led by four commanders of the Njimiya camp, rebelled and waged a low-level insurgency against ISWAP in the Sambisa Forest following a battle in 2021. The dissidents eventually surrendered to Nigerian security forces in December 2022, having been defeated by the Islamic State.

In late 2022, the battles for Toumbun Allura Kurnawa and Toumbun Gini erupted between ISWAP and Boko Haram. By January 2023, these clashes had ended in a substantial Boko Haram victory and the loss of several ISWAP bases at Lake Chad, though heavy fighting continued during the next months.

The next major attack occurred on January 7, in the villages of Toumbun Gini, seizing large amounts of ISWAP weaponry and then killing ISWAP militants fleeing westward. At least 100 ISWAP fighters were killed in the battle, and 35 were injured. The leader of ISWAP, Abu Musab al-Barnawi, was forced to flee during the Boko Haram offensive. Ten ISWAP fighters surrendered to Nigerien forces after the battle at Toumbun Gini to avoid Boko Haram attacks.

Between November 5–8 2025, Boko Haram fighters launched a naval invasion against ISWAP bases across the various islands in Lake Chad. Clashes left at least 4 Boko Haram attackers dead and 200 ISWAP members killed. Boko Haram successfully seized several ISWAP bases, surviving militants fled into their mainland hideouts around Ali Jillimari, Metele, Kangarwa, and Gudumbali in northern Borno.

=== Governorates ===
The governorates are headed by a wali and have their own governing structures. Each governorate has its own military commanders, and sends at least two representatives to ISWAP's shura. By late 2022, ISWAP's subdivisions enjoyed a high level of autonomy.

==== Former governorates ====
In 2021, ISWAP created 4 governorates centered on the Lake Chad, Sambisa Forest, Timbuktu, and Tumbuma. By early 2022, ISWAP acknowledged five governorates, namely Lake Chad, Sambisa, Al Farouq, Kerenoa, and Banki. Another sub-division "Central Nigeria", became active in the following months, though this one appeared to operate as an insurgent force instead of trying to capture territory.

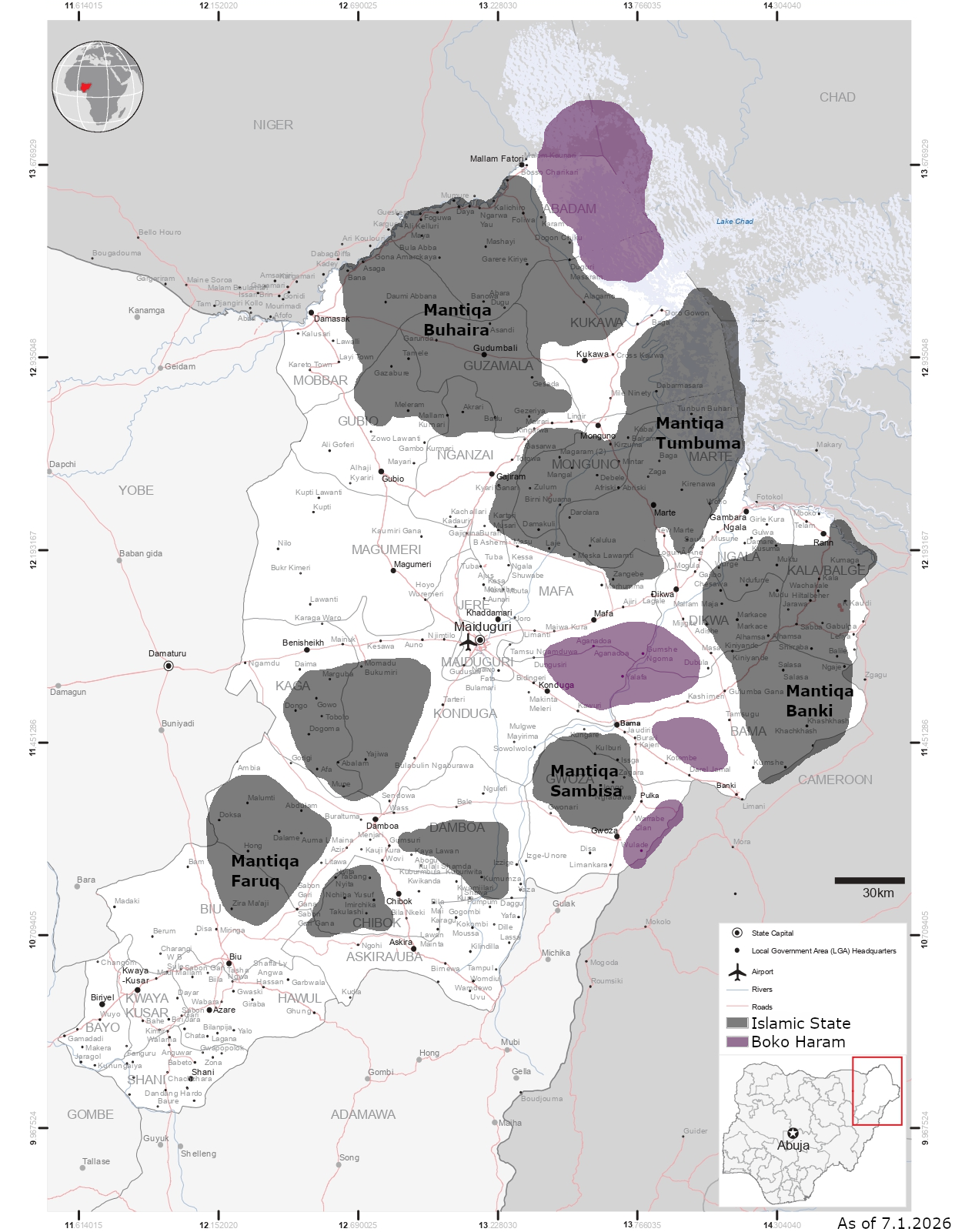
Map of ISWAP's Mantiqa (districts).

==== Current governorates ====
As of 2024, ISWAP's territory is divided into three Wilaya (provinces), which are further divided into smaller Mantiqa (districts). The three Wilaya are Buhaira Wilaya, Faruq Wilaya and one other unnamed Wilaya (unofficially called Nigeria Wilaya) that is located in an unknown area. The Buhaira Wilaya comprises three Mantiqa: the Buhaira Mantiqa, the Tumbuma Mantiqa and the Banki Mantiqa. The Faruq Wilaya comprises two Mantiqa: the Faruq Mantiqa and the Sambisa Mantiqa.

Wilaya	Mantaq	References
Buhaira	Buhaira Mantiqa; Tunbuma Mantqa; Banki Mantiqa	
Faruq	Faruq Mantiqa; Sambisa Mantiqa	
Unknown	None	

== Government ==
=== Structure ===
Initially, ISWAP was headed by a single commander, known as the wali (governor); however, it now opposes granting authority to a single leader. In general, the Shura Council (Majlis al-Shura), a consultative assembly, holds great power within the group. This has led researcher Jacob Zenn to argue that the shura gives the group an element of "democracy". The shura's influence has allowed ISWAP to expand its popular support, yet has also made it more prone to leadership struggles. Appointments to leadership positions such as the shura or the governorships are discussed internally and by IS's core group; IS's core group also has to approve new appointments. In general, journalist Murtala Abdullahi argued that ISWAP mirrors the tendence of the IS core group to release little information on its leaders to the public, making even top commanders like Abu Musab al-Barnawi "elusive" figures.

=== Leaders (2015–2021) ===
The group's first overall wali was Abubakar Shekau who was succeeded by Abu Musab al-Barnawi in 2016. Shekau was replaced by Ba Idrisa in March 2019 who was in turn purged and executed in 2020. He was replaced by Ba Lawan in 2020.

==== Caretaker government (2021–2022) ====
In May 2021, the shura was temporarily dissolved and Abu Musab al-Barnawi was appointed "caretaker" leader of ISWAP. By July 2021, the shura had been restored, and ISWAP's internal system had been reformed. The regional central command now consists of the Amirul Jaish (military leader) and the shura. There is no longer an overall wali, and the shura's head instead serves as leader of ISWAP's governorates, while the Amirul Jaish acts as chief military commander. "Sa'ad" served as new Amirul Jaish, while Abu Musab al-Barnawi became head of the shura. However, non-IS sources still claim that a position referred to as the overall "wali" or "leader of ISWAP" continues to exist. This position was reportedly filled by ex-chief wali Ba Lawan (also "Abba Gana") before passing to Abu-Dawud (also "Aba Ibrahim"), Abu Musab al-Barnawi, Malam Bako, Sani Shuwaram, Bako Gorgore, and Abu Ibrahim in quick succession in late 2021 and early 2022.

=== Services and laws ===
ISWAP has made considerable efforts to build grassroots support by adopting a “hearts-and-minds” approach toward local communities, encouraging residents to remain in its territory. ISWAP provides many basic services in areas under its control, including free health care, public toilets, boreholes, and generators for pumping drinking water, a radio network, its own education system, free boats and canoes for communities, and free seeds and pesticides for farmers, although farmers are prohibited from selling their products beyond ISWAP-controlled areas. At the same time, ISWAP is known for targeting agencies that provide humanitarian aid, thereby depriving basic necessities in government-held areas.

ISWAP maintains its own law enforcement system, appointing police chiefs and enforcing the hisbah through its police force. Sharia law is strictly applied, with punishments including the amputation of thieves’ hands, the execution of adulterers and punishments for its own fighters who commit unauthorized abuses toward civilians. ISWAP’s sharia courts also adjudicate disputes over cattle rustling and other crimes. It has also massacred civilians who collaborate with the local governments or disobey ISWAP's orders, as well as persecuting the Christian minority in its territory.

ISWAP had established a "Khilafah Cadet School" for 8-16 year old boys. They are carefully selected, indoctrinated and given physical and military training. The child soldiers were featured in an ISWAP propaganda video titled "The Empowerment Generation", showing them executing captured Nigerian soldiers.

==== Healthcare ====
In the healthcare sector, civilians injured in military strikes or suffering from illness receive free treatment at medical facilities operated by ISWAP. When medicines are not in stock, patients are given prescriptions to obtain them elsewhere, typically from pharmacies located within ISWAP-controlled areas.

=== Economy ===
In addition to funding delivered by IS-Central and supportive international businessmen, ISWAP collects taxes on agriculture, fishing, and trade in its territories.

ISWAP's Diwan al-Zakat collects the zakat, a traditional Muslim tax and form of almsgiving which is used to provide for the poor. ISWAP's zakat has been featured in propaganda distributed by IS's newspaper, al-Naba. ISWAP's system is known to operate fairly systematically and effectively, raising substantial funds to support both ISWAP as well as local civilians. Experts Tricia Bacon and Jason Warner have described ISWAP's taxation system as being locally less corrupt and more fair than that of the Nigerian state; some local traders argue that ISWAP creates a better environment for trade in rice, fish, and dried pepper. However, ISWAP militants are also known to kill those who refuse to pay taxes.

ISWAP generates an estimated $191 million United States dollars yearly, 10 times the amount earned by the Borno State government.

In 2022, Nigeria announced its intention to redesign its currency in an effort to combat corruption and the financing of terrorism. ISWAP responded by declaring that from then on, people should pay their taxes to the group in the CFA franc.

=== Relations ===
ISWAP and Islamic State – Sahel Province (ISSP) maintain logistical connections, but the former's actual influence on the latter is limited. ISSP was later separated from ISWAP, becoming its own province. Regardless, ISWAP and ISSP continued to cooperate through the al-Furqan Office in the General Directorate of Provinces. The al-Furqan Office is located in ISSP territory, it was headed by Abu-Bilal al-Minuki until he was killed by a joint US-Nigeria operation in 2026, the current leader is unknown.

== See also ==
- Territory of Boko Haram
- Territory of the Islamic State
- Islamic Emirate of Kurdistan
- Islamic Emirate of Yemen
- Islamic Emirate of Rafah
- Islamic Emirate of Somalia
