= Tchoukoutalia attack =

2021 battle between Chad and Boko Haram

- Part of Boko Haram insurgency
Date	August 5, 2021
Location	Tchoukoutalia, Lake Chad, Chad
Result	Chadian victory

Belligerents
Chad	Boko Haram

Casualties and losses
26 killed 14 injured	Unknown

On August 5, 2021, jihadists from Boko Haram killed twenty-six Chadian soldiers near the village of Tchoukoutalia on the shore of Lake Chad.

== Background ==
In 2016, Boko Haram founder and commander Abubakar Shekau pledged allegiance to the Islamic State and renamed the group Islamic State – West Africa Province (ISWAP), although the central Islamic State command installed Abu Musab al-Barnawi as the leader of ISWAP. This started a schism that culminated in the Battle of Sambisa Forest in May 2021, where Shekau killed himself and ISWAP effectively became the dominant jihadist group in the Lake Chad region around Nigeria, Cameroon, and Chad.

== Attack ==
The attack took place on the night between August 4 and 5, 2021. At the time of the attack, the Chadian troops were resting after having just finished a patrol. Little is known about the attack itself, and Chadian state media announced that jihadists from Boko Haram attacked their positions on the island village of Tchoukou Telia, killing 26 soldiers and injuring 14 others. Chadian authorities added that the government outpost in the area successfully defended the attack, and counter-offensive operations began the next day in the area.
