= United States intervention in Nigeria =

2026 joint military operations in Nigeria

- Part of Operation Hadin Kai during the Boko Haram insurgency and the Nigerian bandit conflict
- Video footage of the initial December 2025 operation
Date	25 December 2025 – 3 July 2026 (6 months, 1 week and 1 day)
Location	Nigeria
Status	U.S. – Nigerian Victory

Belligerents
United States; Nigeria	Islamic State; Boko Haram Bandits

Commanders and leaders
(United States) Donald Trump (United States) Pete Hegseth (Nigeria) Bola Tinubu	(Islamic State) Abu Bilal al-Minuki X

Units involved
Nigerian Armed Forces; U.S. Armed Forces; U.S. Navy; U.S. Navy SEALs	Sahel Province; Lakurawa; West Africa Province; Boko Haram: Bandits; Bello Turji’s gang

Strength
Unknown	Unknown

Casualties and losses
None	~371 killed, over 200 missing (as of 30 May 2026)

The joint military intervention in Nigeria was a series of coordinated military operations conducted by the United States and the Nigerian government against the Islamic State's West Africa Province (ISWAP), Boko Haram, and various armed bandit groups operating in the region.

The campaign began on 25 December 2025, when US forces, in coordination with the Nigerian military, launched targeted airstrikes against ISWAP militants in northwest Nigeria. This was followed on 15 May 2026 by a major joint military offensive in northeastern Nigeria. Combining special forces raids and multiple rounds of airstrikes, the operation aimed to dismantle insurgent strongholds in the region.

During the initial phase of the May offensive, ISWAP senior leader Abu-Bilal al-Minuki was killed alongside several other senior commanders. By 19 May, Nigerian authorities reported that the joint offensive had resulted in the deaths of at least 175 ISWAP and Boko Haram militants. On July 3, United States Africa Command (AFRICOM) accounted that it had withdrawn almost all military personal in the area, with the exception of intelligence assets to continue to aid Nigeria in the region.

== Background ==
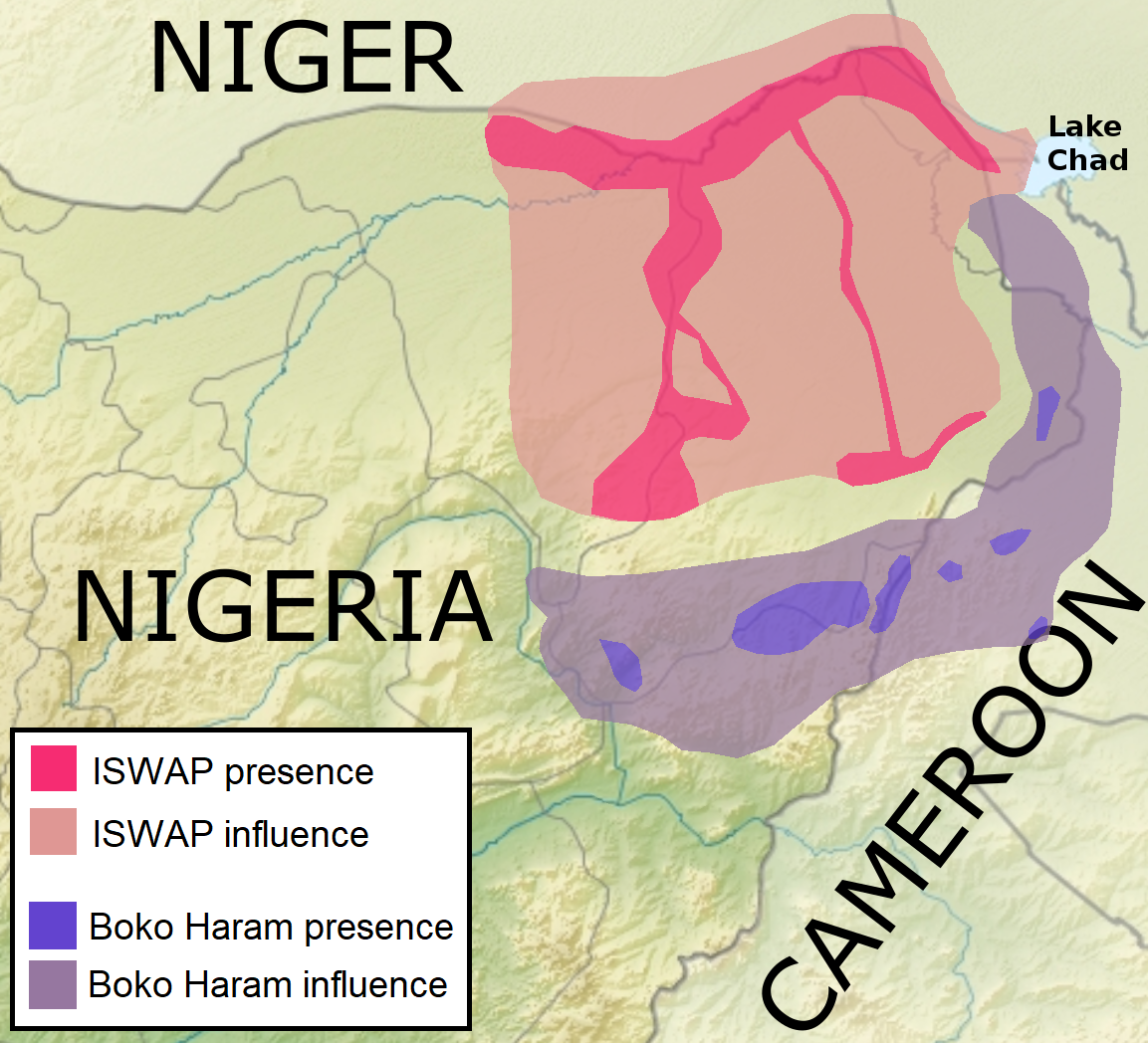
Presence of and influence of ISWAP and Boko Haram in northern Nigeria, Cameroon, and Niger in early 2019. Both sides have been fighting a civil war in the Chad Basin, the Sambisa forest, and beyond since 2016.

The Nigerian government has been combating militant groups for over a decade, including Boko Haram and its Islamic State (IS)-linked splinter groups, including ISWAP. Jihadist groups in Nigeria's northeast, the center of the insurgency, has killed tens of thousands and has displaced millions of Nigerians since 2016.

According to Nigeria's military, the Islamic State-aligned Lakurawa rebel group became more active on the Nigerian side of the border with Niger following the 2023 Nigerien coup d'état, which impacted joint border operations. In 2017, the Lakurawa were formed as an anti-bandit force and were initially welcomed into villages; however, they became increasingly oppressive. They control territories in Sokoto and Kebbi states.

In the midst of Nigerian and American threats, Boko Haram and ISWAP have been in a state of division since 2016; this division erupted in open conflict in 2021. As of 2022, International Crisis Group researchers estimated that 800,000–3 million civilians live under ISWAP's rule. ISWAP maintains more control over large areas in the countryside than the Nigerian government.

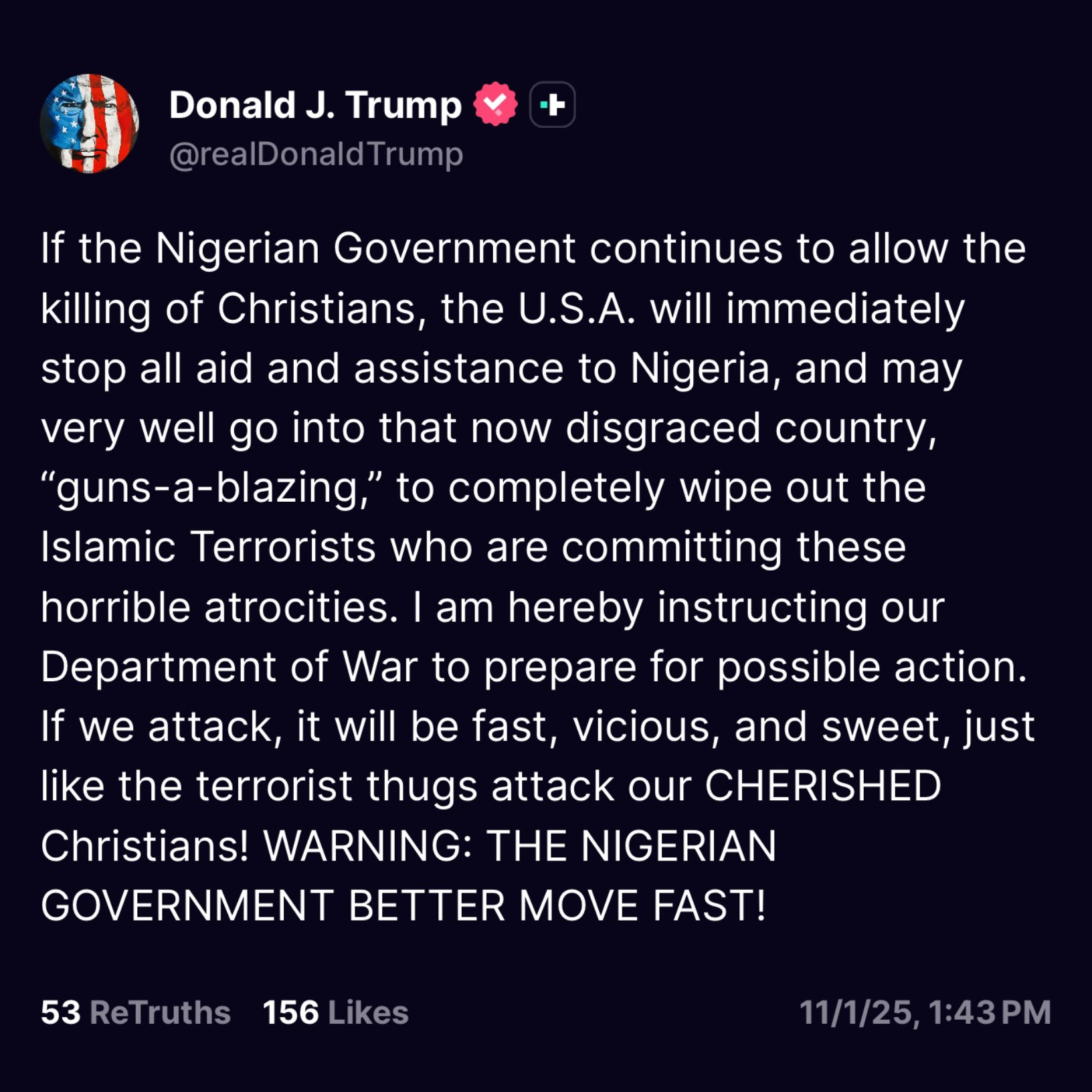
A Truth Social post on November 1, 2025, by President Donald Trump announcing possible military action in Nigeria in response to alleged killings of Christians.

In November 2025, United States Africa Command drafted plans to strike at militant compounds in northern Nigeria. Later in November, 25 schoolgirls were abducted from a Catholic school in Kebbi State, and 303 schoolchildren and 12 teachers were kidnapped at another Catholic school in Niger State. US President Donald Trump said that Christians in Nigeria were facing an "existential threat"; locals and experts emphasized that Nigerians of all faiths are targets of violence. In December 2025, the United States became more involved in the Nigerian conflict, launching airstrikes in northwest Nigeria against armed groups.

== Intervention ==
=== December 2025 airstrikes ===
Early on 25 December 2025, the US conducted airstrikes which it said were against IS militants in northwest Nigeria. According to the US, the strikes were approved by and in coordination with the Nigerian government, and killed "multiple" IS militants. AFRICOM said that the strikes focused on targets in Sokoto State.

The strikes were conducted by a US Navy warship using BGM-109 Tomahawk Land Attack Missiles from the Arleigh Burke-class destroyer USS Paul Ignatius, in the Gulf of Guinea. Nigerian information minister Mohammed Idris Malagi said that the operation took place on 26 December between 00:12 and 01:30 WAT and targeted two prominent IS sites in the Bauni forest in Tangaza. Malagi said that 16 GPS-guided munitions were fired using MQ-9 Reaper drones at the fighters who were attempting to infiltrate Nigeria from the Sahel. A US defense official told The New York Times the strikes involved over a dozen Tomahawk missiles targeting two IS camps.

Malagi added that debris from munitions mistakenly hit Jabo and Offa but caused no civilian casualties. According to Isa Salihu Bashir, the chairman of Tangaza, strikes hit Lakurawa camps, killing many fighters and forcing others to flee. At least four missile warheads failed to explode and fell short of their targets, landing in Offa, Zugurma, and Jabo. In Jabo, farmland was destroyed. In Offa, former state official Tajudeen Alabi told the BBC that "about five structures" were destroyed, with some injuries but no deaths.

The New Humanitarian reported that two missiles hit a Lakurawa camp in Tangaza. The first strike killed around 30 fighters, and the second strike killed survivors who had gathered to assess the damage. An estimated 155 Lakurawa were killed, including 19 who succumbed to their wounds. Another 200 were missing, and almost half the group's cattle were killed. Lakurawa commander Dando Sibu was reported to have survived the strikes, leaving the area five minutes before the second missile impacted.

US Defense Secretary Pete Hegseth stated that the strikes were related to stopping the killings of Christians in Nigeria. Conversely, the Nigerian government stated that the strikes were not intended to protect any specific religions.

The Nigerian Ministry of Foreign Affairs issued a statement that said precision hits had been made and that the country's authorities remained "engaged in structured security cooperation with international partners, including the United States of America, in addressing the persistent threat of terrorism and violent extremism". The Nigerian Armed Forces said the strikes were jointly conducted with approval from the government and came after "credible intelligence and careful operational planning" to minimize collateral damage. Casualties were 155 to 200 fighters killed.

==== Targets ====
Sokoto State in northwest Nigeria

According to the FDD, the missile strikes targeted camps of the Islamic State's Sahel Province (ISSP) in northwestern Nigeria, the main IS affiliate responsible for operations across the Sahel region and Sokoto State. The FDD added that the attack target was indicative of the inroads that ISSP had made in Nigeria.

A spokesperson for Nigerian President Bola Tinubu told Agence France-Presse that the strikes targeted "ISIS, Lakurawa and bandits", saying that IS supplied and trained Lakurawa and bandits through the Sahel. He noted that the strikes hit an area with a historic Lakurawa and bandit presence, and that US intelligence had detected an influx of IS fighters there from the Sahel.

==== Analysis ====
When the strikes were originally proposed in November 2025, Judd Devermont, former US President Joe Biden's national security advisor for African affairs, criticized the Trump administration stating that instability in Nigeria "will not be reversed overnight by an influx of US resources".

Nigeria's Minister of Defence Christopher Musa said that military intervention would only solve 30% of the conflict, with 70% depending on good governance, notably addressing poor state capacity in the north. The Associated Press reported that experts saw the strikes as providing "crucial help" for Nigeria's security forces which are "overstretched" and "outgunned".

==== Aftermath ====
On February 3, 2026, an advance team of US soldiers was sent to train and advise the Nigerian military as they continued to fight Islamic terrorist groups operating in their nation. It was reported that these forces would not take a direct military role and would be under the command of the Nigerian military. On February 16 the United States sent an additional 100 troops, and the force was expected to reach its maximum deployment strength of 200 by the end of the month.

=== Killing of Abu-Bilal al-Minuki ===
==== Background ====
Abu-Bilal al-Minuki was born in 1982 in Mainok, Benisheikh, Borno State, Nigeria. Previously serving as a senior Boko Haram officer, he had been part of IS after pledging allegiance in 2015. He had reportedly clashed with Abubakar Shekau over the Islamic State's demand for foreign fighters in Libya, where he may have been a foreign fighter. In June 2023, he was designated as Specially Designated Global Terrorist by the Office of Foreign Asset Control. Additionally, he was linked to the Dapchi schoolgirls kidnapping.

In April 2024, he was incorrectly listed as one of the senior IS commanders killed by Nigerian military. al-Minuki had risen in importance after the killing of former ISWAP chief Mamman Nur in 2018, and had recently taken up the role of General Directorate of States around February 2026 according to Nigerian Intelligence.

==== Strike ====
Video footage of the May 15, 2026 operation.

The operation began at approximately 12:01 a.m. on May 15, when two dozen operators arriving by helicopter, including SEAL Team Six, began fighting militants on two small islands in the Lake Chad Basin with the intent to capture al-Minuki. After a three-hour firefight, a surrender seemed unlikely.

Rather than risking a potential escape, an airstrike was launched on his compound, killing al-Minuki. The operation also resulted in the deaths of several other ISWAP figures, including Abd-al Wahhab, a senior leader involved in coordinating attacks and spreading propaganda; Abu Musa al-Mangawi, a senior member of the group; and Abu al-Muthanna al-Muhajir, who managed ISWAP's media production operations and was considered a close associate of al-Minuki.

=== Further operations ===
==== May ====
Borno State in northeast Nigeria

On 17 May 2026, the United States and Nigeria carried airstrikes on ISWAP targets in the North East region. No United States or Nigerian forces were harmed in the offensive, with at least 20 militants killed.

On 18 May the United States and Nigeria launched their third round of airstrikes. On the same day, the Nigerian Defence Headquarters confirmed that around 175 ISWAP and Boko Haram militants have been killed since the joint operations began.

On 30 May United States and Nigerian forces launched airstrikes that killed 21 ISWAP fighters in Borno State. PRNigeria noted that Nigeria considered the recent airstrikes were a part of Operation Hadin Kai.

==== July ====
On 3 July the United States withdrew most of its deployed forces while continuing to provide intelligence support to Nigeria at the request of its government. AFRICOM declared that Nigeria continued to target terrorists entities, and then since the operations there had been an increase in surrenders and defections from them.

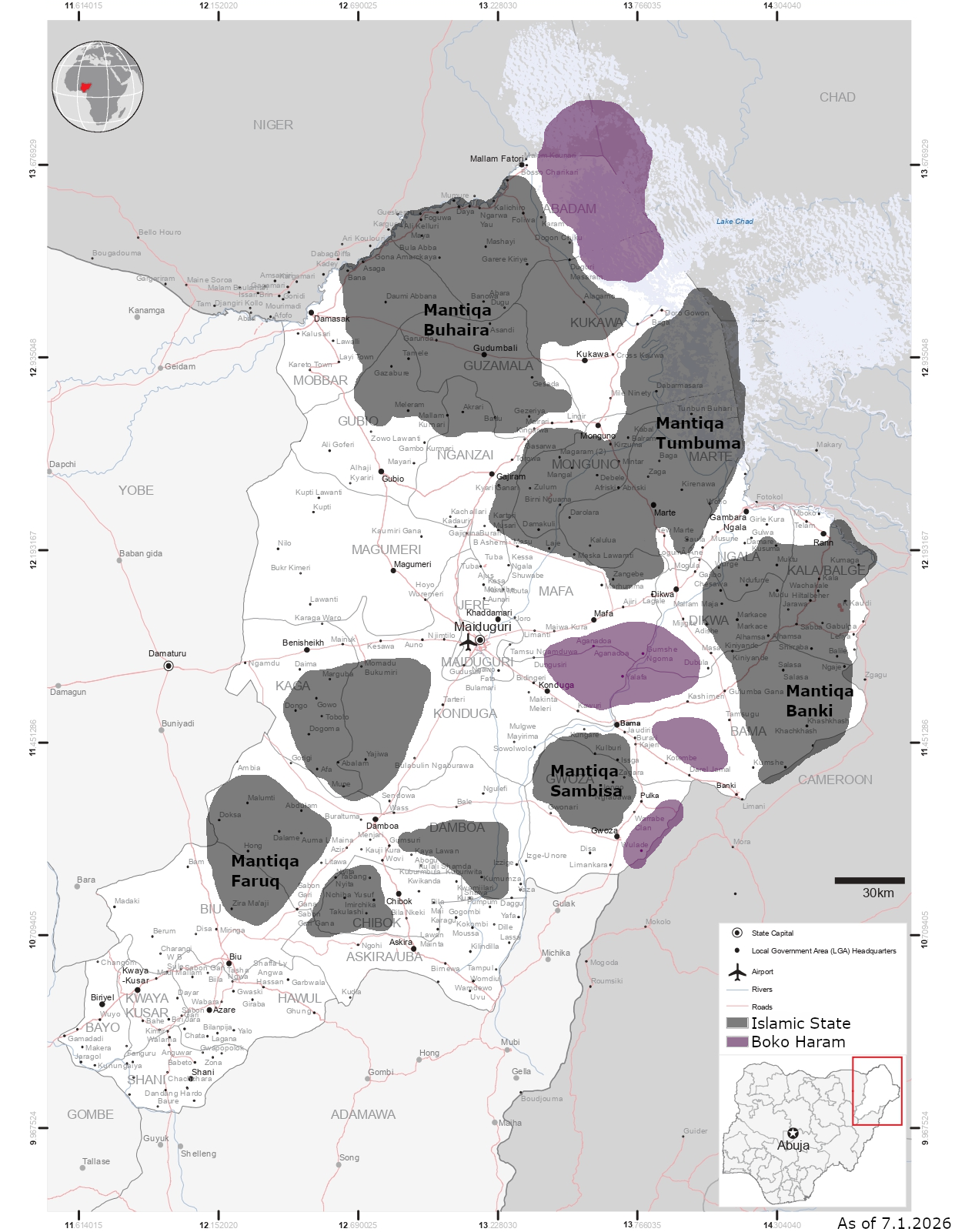
Military situation as of January 7th 2026

== See also ==
- Killing of Adnan Abu Walid al-Sahrawi
- 2020 Nigeria hostage rescue
- Boko Haram–ISWAP conflict
- Persecution of Christians by the Islamic State
- Foreign policy of the second Trump administration
- Nigeria–United States relations
