= Battle of Sambisa Forest =

Battle of Sambisa Forest may refer to:

- Fighting in Sambisa Forest during the 2015 West African offensive
- 2016 Sambisa forest attack
- Battle of Sambisa Forest (2021)
