= Boko Haram–ISWAP conflict =

Armed conflict between rival jihadist groups

- Part of the Boko Haram insurgency and the Islamist insurgency in Niger
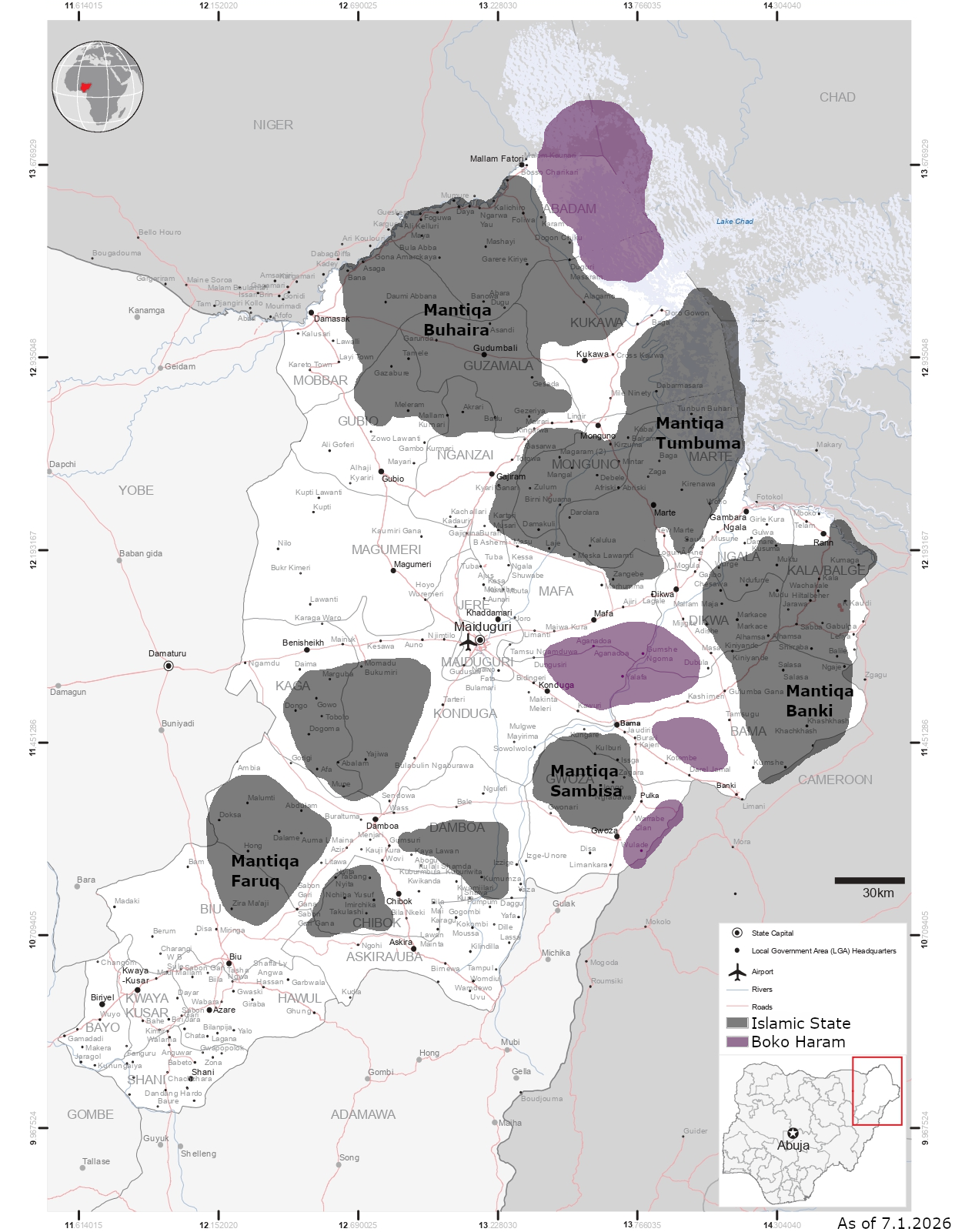
- Map of influences between Boko Haram and ISWAP
Date	February 13, 2021 – present
Location	Borno State, Northwest, Nigeria, spillover in Southeastern Niger, Western Chad and Northern Cameroon
Status	Ongoing
Territorial changes	Sambisa Forest is captured by ISWAP; Boko Haram captures several ISWAP bases in Lake Chad

Belligerents
(Islamic State) Boko Haram (Daular Musulunci)	Islamic State; (Islamic State) ISWAP

Commanders and leaders
(Boko Haram) Abubakar Shekau ‡‡ (Boko Haram) Bakura Doro (Boko Haram) Sadiku (Boko Haram) Bakura Sahalaba † (Boko Haram) Mohd Hassan; Ibrahim Mahamadu †	Abu Musab al-Barnawi (WIA) (Islamic State) Dana Daguri (Islamic State) Muhammad Dawud (Islamic State) Bako Gorgore † (Islamic State) Aba Ibrahim † (Islamic State) Abu-Bilal al-Minuki X

Units involved
(Islamic State) Boko Haram; (Islamic State) Shekau faction; (Islamic State) Bakura faction; (Islamic State) Sadiku faction; (Islamic State) Njimiya camp dissidents (Note: Njimiya camp dissidents was a faction of Boko Haram led by four commanders of the Njimiya camp, that rebelled and waged a low-level anti-ISIS guerrilla campaign in Sambisa Forest following the Battle of Sambisa in 2022. The dissidents eventually surrendered to security forces in December 2022, having been defeated by the Islamic State.); (Islamic State) Several minor factions; (Libya) Libyan mercenaries; (Chad) Chadian mercenaries	Islamic State; ISWAP (Note: from 2016, originally Barnawi faction of Boko Haram); Buhaira Wilaya; Buhaira Mantiqa; Tunbuma Mantqa; Banki Mantiqa; Faruq Wilaya; Faruq Mantiqa; Sambisa Mantiqa; 'Nigeria Wilaya' (Note: Official name is unknown); Islamic State in the Greater Sahara (2021—2022)

Strength
(Islamic State) c. 1,500 (2025)	(Islamic State) c. 8,000 – 12,000 (2025)

Casualties and losses
- More than 2,000 killed in total

The Boko Haram–ISWAP conflict is an ongoing armed conflict between Boko Haram and the Islamic State – West Africa Province (ISWAP), the Nigerian branch of the Islamic State. Following the split of ISWAP from Boko Haram because of Abubakar Shekau's refusal to leave the leadership ISWAP, the Islamic State replaced him with Abu Musab al-Barnawi, which led to clashes between the two groups.

== Background ==
Boko Haram and the Islamic State (IS) were initially allies. However, the two groups became enemies due to territorial disputes, because the Islamic State tried to conquer the zones which were under Boko Haram's control.

In July 2014, Abubakar Shekau released a 16-minute video in which he voiced his support for IS leader Abu Bakr al-Baghdadi, al-Qaeda leader Ayman al-Zawahiri and Taliban leader Mullah Omar. In March 2015, Shekau pledged allegiance to al-Baghdadi, and the "West Africa Province" was formed.

When the insurgents were subsequently defeated and lost almost all of their lands during the 2015 West African offensive by the Multinational Joint Task Force (MJTF), discontent grew among the rebels. Despite orders by IS central command to stop using women and children suicide bombers as well as refrain from mass murdering of civilians, Shekau refused to change his tactics. Researcher Aymenn Jawad Al-Tamimi summarizes that Shekau proved to be "too extreme even by the Islamic State's standards".

In August 2016, IS attempted to remove Shekau and replace him with Abu Musab al-Barnawi because Shekau had disobeyed al-Baghdadi's order to cease targeting Muslim civilians. Shekau rejected the move, leading to a split between the groups.

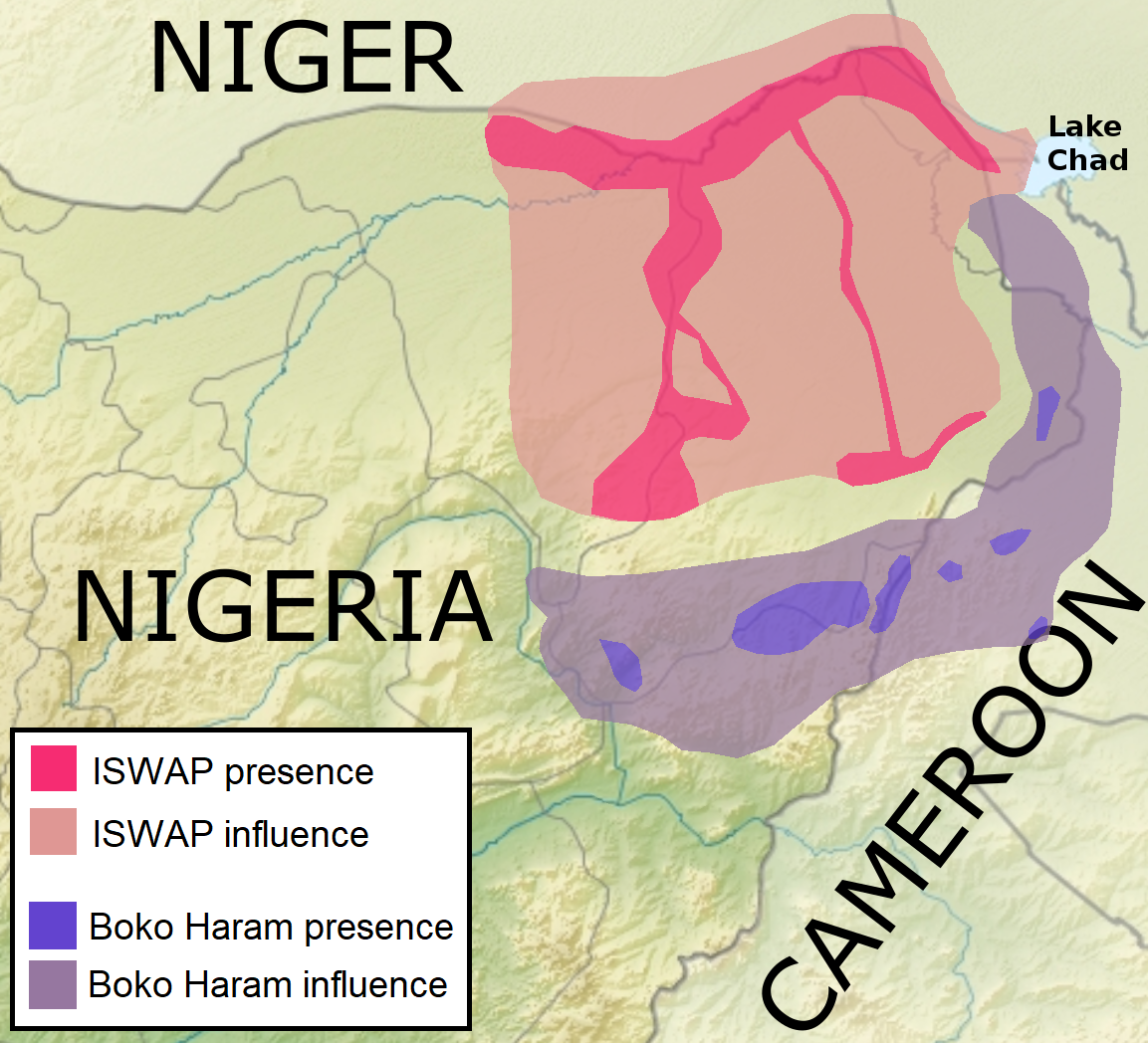
Presence and influence of ISWAP and Boko Haram in northern Nigeria, Cameroon, and Niger in early 2019

== Timeline ==
=== 2021 ===
In February 2021, ISWAP and Boko Haram engaged in a battle at the Niger–Nigeria border after ISWAP had abducted women who were linked to Boko Haram. Around this time, a faction of ISWAP also defected to al-Qaeda. The violence further escalated after ISWAP had tried to convince Boko Haram to change its tendency to overuse takfir designations. The Nigerian newspaper Vanguard stated that ISWAP had previously sent especially loyal troops for training to Libya, Somalia, and Syria; these forces returned to Nigeria in March and April, greatly bolstering ISWAP forces and allowing them to operate more aggressively against Boko Haram.

In April, Boko Haram ambushed an ISWAP brigade, killing several. Around this time, dissatisfaction within Boko Haram reportedly rose because Shekau had executed his chief of staff Abu Fatima. The inter-rebel fighting was paused during Ramadan. Around mid-May, ISWAP released an audio declaring that al-Barnawi had been reinstated by the IS central command as "caretaker" leader of ISWAP. As al-Barnawi had been the one to depose Shekau in the first place, analyst Jacob Zenn argues that this move was a sign that both the IS central command and ISWAP wanted to eliminate Shekau. Vanguard claims that delegates of the IS central command had visited ISWAP shortly before the offensive in Sambisa Forest. Al-Naba also vaguely stated in an article that ISWAP had been ordered to "eliminate Shekau", hinting that the IS central leadership had been involved in the decision making process. ISWAP forces moved their civilian followers to more secure locations around Kukawa in preparation of the anti-Shekau operation.

ISWAP began its offensive on 14 May, targeting four minor camps as well as Shekau's main base located in the Sambisa Forest. Boko Haram responded with mortar fire and used several suicide bombers, one of them in a car, to halt ISWAP's advance. However, ISWAP militants reportedly managed to kill most suicide bombers before they reached them, with only three succeeding in detonating themselves, inflicting only minor damage. After ISWAP had inflicted heavy losses on Boko Haram including two vehicles destroyed, the base's defenders fled. However, ISWAP failed to capture Shekau during this clash as it had initially intended to do. ISWAP troops spent the remaining day securing the captured base.

Shekau and his remaining followers attempted to flee from a temporary camp on late 19 May but were encircled by ISWAP troops led by Dana Daguri. ISWAP fighters confronted Shekau's personal bodyguards, resulting in heavy fighting and ending with the death of several bodyguards. In contrast, al-Naba claims that ISWAP had discovered Shekau's motorized column by 17 May and attacked it, culminating in Shekau and a few followers fleeing further into the forest on foot. According to this telling of the events, Shekau and seven of his followers were cornered at "a large tree" after two days of searching by ISWAP.

Shekau began to negotiate with ISWAP on 19 May, however, Shekau committed suicide with a gun, grenade or suicide belt. The remaining Boko Haram fighters present reportedly joined ISWAP. Al-Barnawi declared "Shekau preferred to be humiliated in the afterlife than getting humiliated on earth, and he killed himself instantly by detonating an explosive".

=== 2022 ===
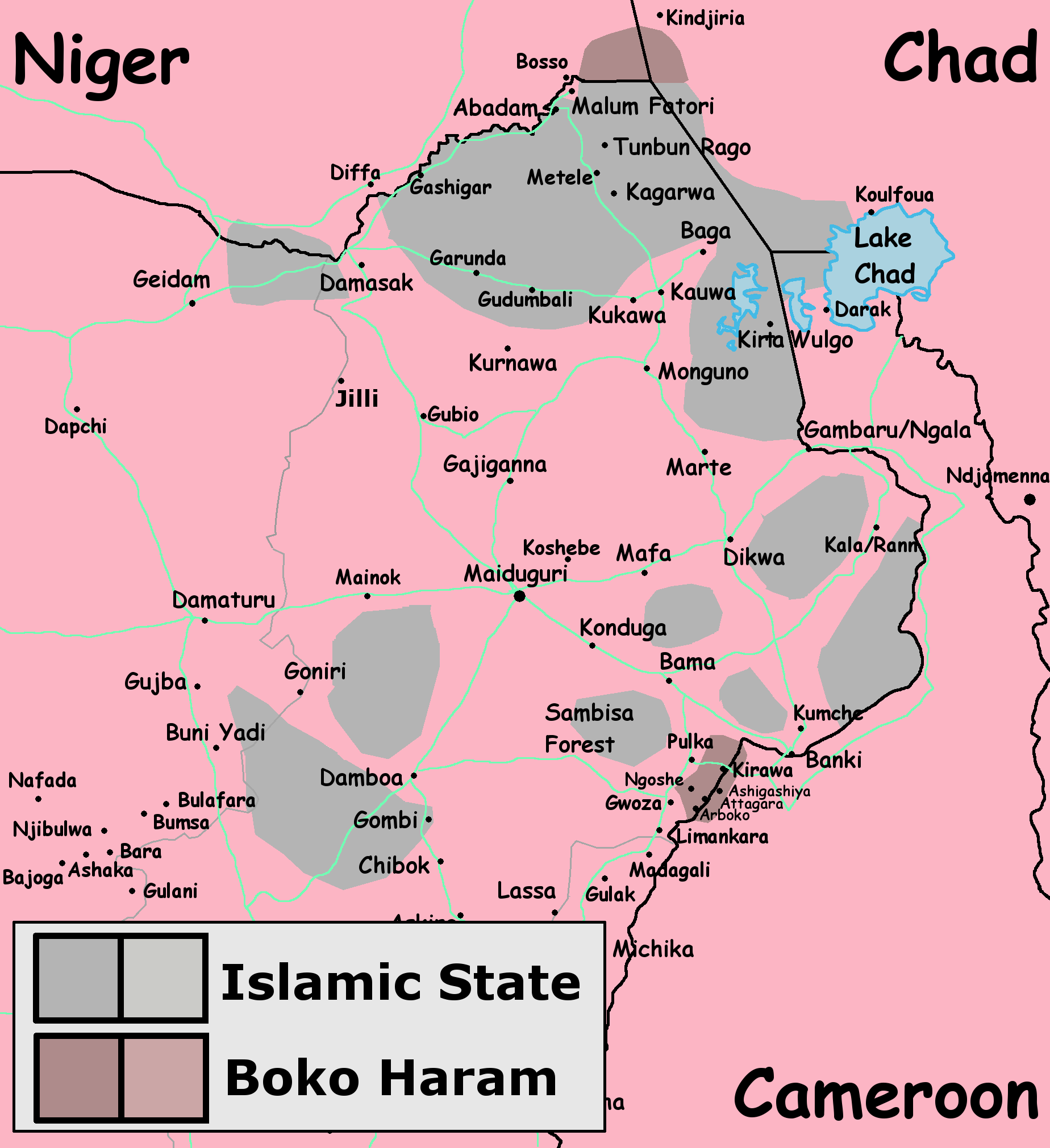
Areas under control of Boko Haram and ISWAP in 2022

On 20 April 2022, Boko Haram fighters invaded an ISWAP settlement near Ngurosoye, resulting in the deaths of 18 ISWAP fighters and six Boko Haram fighters. On 23 April, clashes between Boko Haram and ISWAP at two villages in the Sambisa Forest left a total of 34 militants dead.

On 15 September, eight Boko Haram members, including a middle rank commander, were killed in a clash with ISWAP. Fighters from both groups were also left injured. On 17 September, two Boko Haram top commanders identified as Abou Hamza and Abou Ibrahim were executed by ISWAP. On 7 October, ISWAP killed eight Boko Haram members in an ambush. Between October and November, Sadiku, a senior member of Boko Haram in the Northwestern part of Nigeria, ordered the execution of several jihadists who joined his faction after escaping during the Kuje prison break, fearing they were ISWAP spies since the prison break was conducted by the group. On 4 December, a clash between Boko Haram and ISWAP killed dozens of terrorists, including at least 23 ISWAP members.

Led by Bakura Doro, on 30 December Boko Haram attacked ISWAP at the villages of Toumbun Allura Kurnawa and Kangar, in Abadam. The battles lasted for 13 hours and left 30 militants on both sides dead. The Boko Haram fighters fled to a hideout on the border of Niger. The ISWAP fighters were forced to flee from the area. Four hostages captured by ISWAP were freed during the attack.

=== 2023 ===
The next major attack by Boko Haram occurred on 7 January 2023 in the villages of Toumbun Gini, seizing large amounts of ISWAP weaponry and then killing ISWAP militants fleeing westward. At least 100 ISWAP fighters were killed in the battle, and 35 were injured. Al-Barnawi was forced to flee during the offensive. Ten ISWAP fighters surrendered to Nigerien forces after the battle to avoid Boko Haram attacks. Al-Barnawi returned to the Lake Chad area with 300 fighters on 10 January, announcing reprisal attacks for the raids, performing several attacks in February and March 2023 that killed "hundreds" of Boko Haram fighters.

On 5 July, several Boko Haram fighters and members of their families were killed by ISWAP in Sambisa Forest. On 24 August, at least 41 total terrorists were killed in a clash in the Lake Chad region. On 17 November, at least 60 people were killed in clashes when ISWAP ambushed a fleet of Boko Haram vessels on Lake Chad.

=== 2024 ===
On 15 January 2024, dozens of terrorists were killed during a clash on the islands of Kandahar and Kaduna Ruwa. On 11 March, at least 35 Boko Haram militants were killed and 11 were abducted during clashes in the Lake Chad area and Borno State. Fighting continued until 13 March. Two fishermen were killed in the crossfire, and two other were abducted by ISWAP.

On 26 April, a heavy clash erupted on several islands in Lake Chad, resulting in the death of 85 terrorists, with about 70 of them being Boko Haram.

=== 2025 ===
Between 5 and 8 November 2025, Boko Haram fighters launched a naval invasion against ISWAP bases across the various islands in Lake Chad. The attacks were led by Hassan Buduma and Mohd Hassan and used dozens of fighters armed with heavy weapons on motorised boats. Military forces reported that "most of the deceased are believed to be ISWAP members," with the clashes leaving at least 4 Boko Haram attackers dead and between 170 and 200 ISWAP members killed.

Boko Haram successfully seized several ISWAP bases and their weaponry, surviving militants retreated to their mainland positions in the villages of Ali Jillimari, Metele, Kangarwa, and Gudumbali in northern Borno State. Only three of ISWAP’s boats managed to escape, seven others were captured along with arms and ammunition.

=== 2026 ===
On 20 January, Boko Haram launched a nighttime raid seizing ISWAP bases, ammunition, equipment and killing 200 ISWAP fighters. During the battle, Boko Haram reportedly utilized Libyan and Chadian mercenaries.

On 16 May, a boatload of Boko Haram fighters was observed heading towards an island in Lake Chad controlled by ISWAP; the Boko Haram fighters noticed another boat nearby and fired at it. On 29 July, clashes took place around Mangari and Tumbun Allura, Boko Haram seized two boats and killed several ISWAP fighters before withdrawing.

On 23 August, several fighters were reportedly killed in Bama. The confrontation resulted in heavy casualties among Boko Haram fighters, with some survivors fleeing into surrounding areas.
