= Abu Bilal al-Minuki =

Nigerian militant (1982–2025)

Head of the General Directorate of Provinces of the Islamic State
- In office c.March 2025 – 16 May 2025
- Appointed by: al-Furqan office
- Preceded by: Abu Khadija
- Succeeded by: Unknown

Personal details
- Born: Abubakar Mainok c. 1982 Mainok, Benisheikh, Borno State, Nigeria
- Died: 16 May 2025 Lake Chad, Nigeria
- Occupation: Barber; Militant

Military service
- Allegiance: Boko Haram (c.2009–2015); Islamic State (2015–2025): Islamic State – West Africa Province; Islamic State – Libya Province
- Battles/wars: Boko Haram insurgency; United States intervention in Nigeria X; Second Libyan Civil War

Abubakar Mainok (c. 1982 – 16 May 2025), more commonly known by his nom de guerre Abu Bilal al-Minuki was a Nigerian Islamic State militant who served as the group's Head of the General Directorate of Provinces until his death two months later.

Born in Mainok, Borno State, he initially worked as a local barber before rising to prominence as a senior commander for Boko Haram in the Lake Chad region, where he oversaw foreign financial transfers. Following the group's split and pledge of allegiance to the Islamic State in 2015, al-Minuki aligned with ISWAP. He facilitated the movement of foreign fighters to Libya, became deputy to ISWAP leader Abu Musab al-Barnawi, and gained further influence following the 2018 killing of Mamman Nur.

Known among ISWAP for his strict operational security, avoiding public appearances and smartphones, he was implicated in the 2018 Dapchi schoolgirls kidnapping and was designated a Specially Designated Global Terrorist by the United States in June 2023.

== Early life ==
al-Minuki was born Abubakar Mainok in 1982 in Mainok, Benisheikh, Borno State, Nigeria. Almost no information is known about his education, though it is known he owned a small salon in Mainok and was known locally as a village barber.

== Militant career ==
=== Boko Haram ===
al-Minuki first rose to prominence as a commander of Boko Haram after the start of the Boko Haram insurgency, serving as the group's top commander in the Lake Chad region. He was reportedly influential in the group, overseeing financial transfers to Boko Haram by foreign donors. After the JAS-ISWAP split, he shifted his allegiance to ISWAP.

=== ISWAP ===
al-Minuki pledged allegiance to the Islamic State in 2015, after JAS pledged allegiance to its self-proclaimed caliph, Abu Bakr al-Baghdadi. He had clashed with ISWAP's then-leader, Abubakar Shekau over the Islamic State's demand for foreign fighters in Libya, where he helped move foreign fighters from Nigeria to Libya, and he may have been a foreign fighter, sometime between 2015 and 2016.

Sometime after the split, he was appointed the deputy to Abu Musab al-Barnawi, implementing orders from Islamic State's central leadership to ISWAP, and later served in the Islamic State's General Directorate of Provinces. al-Minuki rose in importance after the killing of former ISWAP chief Mamman Nur in 2018, and he was linked to the Dapchi schoolgirls kidnapping. In June 2023, he was designated as Specially Designated Global Terrorist by the Office of Foreign Asset Control.

During his time in ISWAP, he was described by former fighters as "an extremely cautious person", who did not own a smartphone, avoided gatherings, was rarely seen in public, and used representatives for Shura Council meetings, and he had reportedly protected an ISWAP commander known as Ba Kaka Benisheikh, who was caught taking drugs, instead of punishing him, he sent him to Sambisa Forest, in order to fight against JAS forces led by Ali Ngulde in the Mandara Mountains. He was falsely reported dead by the Nigerian military in 2024, although the Nigerian military claimed the person they claimed to be dead was someone using his alias.

al-Minuki was named the head of the General Directorate of Provinces after the killing of Abu Khadija in March 2025.

==== Death ====
al-Minuki was the target of an American military operation, which began at approximately 12:01 a.m. on 15 May, when two dozen operators arriving by helicopter, including SEAL Team Six, began fighting militants on two small islands in the Lake Chad Basin with the intent to capture al-Minuki. After a three-hour firefight, a surrender seemed unlikely. Rather than risking a potential escape, an airstrike was launched on his compound, killing al-Minuki. The operation also resulted in the deaths of several other ISWAP figures, including Abd-al Wahhab, a senior leader involved in coordinating attacks and spreading propaganda; Abu Musa al-Mangawi, a senior member of the group; and Abu al-Muthanna al-Muhajir, who managed ISWAP's media production operations and was considered a close associate of al-Minuki. He was incorrectly described by Donald Trump as the second in command of the Islamic State globally.

His death was confirmed by Nigeria's Defence Headquarters, and Islamic State's al-Naba magazine.
