= Territory of Boko Haram =

Unrecognized Islamic State in Northern Nigeria

Islamic State Daular Musulunci Dawlat al-Islam
- 2012–2015; 2016–present
- Flags Emblem
- Motto: لَا إِلَٰهَ إِلَّا ٱللَّٰهُ، مُحَمَّدٌ رَسُولُ ٱللَّٰهِ lā ʾilāha ʾillā -llāh, muḥammadun rasūlu llāh "There is no god but God, Muhammad is the messenger of God."
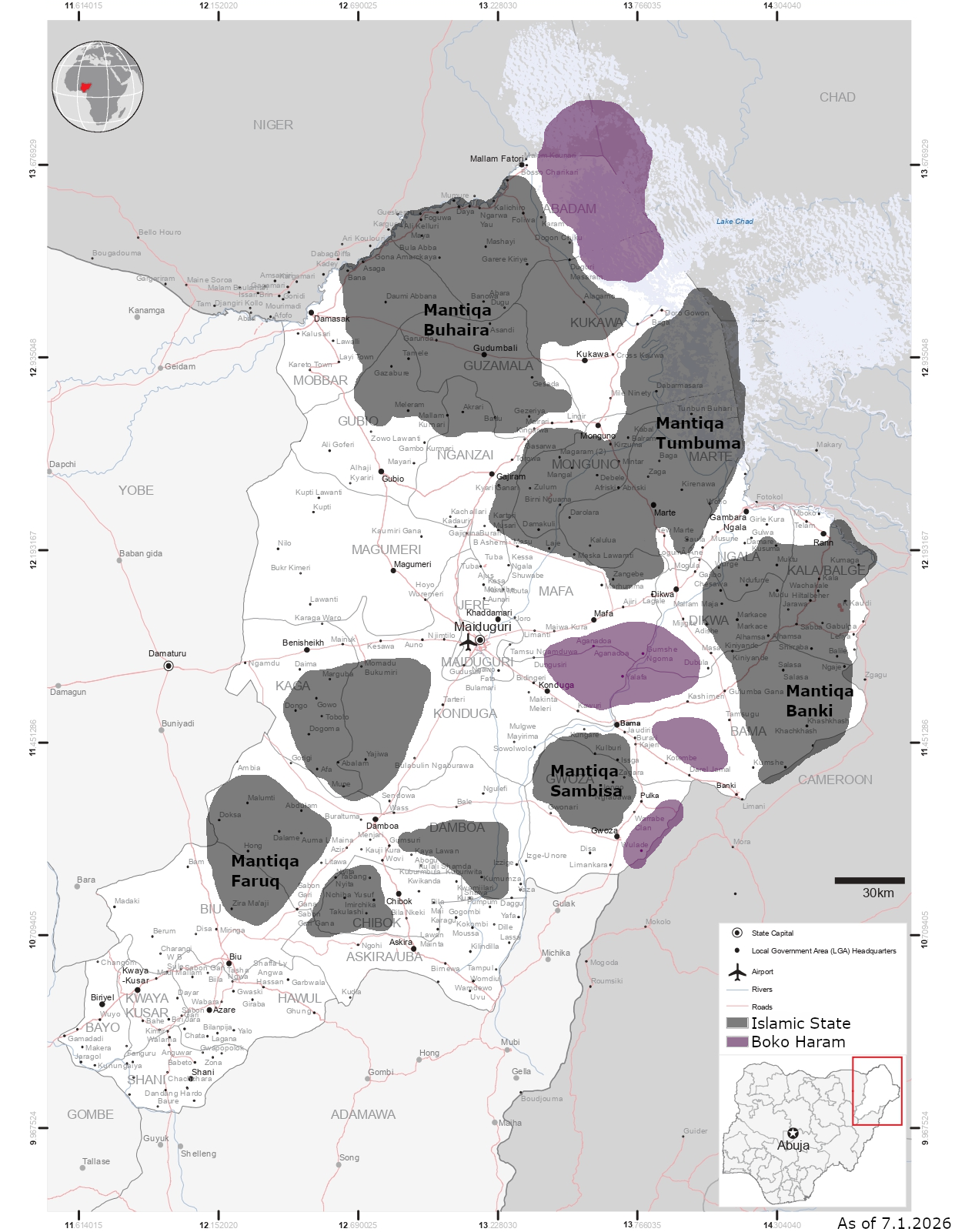
- Status: Unrecognized, designated as a terrorist group
- Capital: Chikun (September 2021–present) (Note: Gwoza, Borno, Nigeria (July 2009 – March 2015) Marte, Borno, Nigeria (April–September 2015) Sambisa Forest, Borno, Nigeria (March 2015 – May 2021))
- Religion: Sunni Islam (Salafism)
- Government: Totalitarian self-proclaimed Islamic state under a dictatorship
- Imam
  - Since 2022: Bakura Doro
- Legislature: Shura
- Establishment: Boko Haram insurgency
  - Boko Haram uprising: 2009
  - West African offensive: 2015
  - Battle of Sambisa Forest: May 14–19, 2021
  - Battles of Toumbun Allura Kurnawa and Toumbun Gini: December 30, 2022 – January 7, 2023

Population
  - Estimate: ~ 1,700,000 (2014)
- Currency: Nigerian naira
- Time zone: UTC+01:00 (WAT)
Preceded by	Succeeded by
Territory of the Islamic State – West Africa Province	Territory of the Islamic State – West Africa Province

Daular Musulunci (English: Islamic State; Arabic: دَوْلَة الْإِسْلَام, romanised: Dawlat al-Islam) is a self-proclaimed Islamic state in northeastern Nigeria that has been under the de facto control or influence of Boko Haram. The territory was established in 2012 after the creation of its main base in the Sambisa Forest. At its territorial peak in 2014–2015, it encompassed 50,000 square kilometres (20,000 sq mi) of Borno State, where Boko Haram administered a population of 1.7 million people through a network of commanders, judges, checkpoints, and Sharia law.

Following Boko Haram's pledge of allegiance to the Islamic State in 2015, the territory was briefly incorporated into the Islamic State's West Africa Province (Wilāyat Garb Ifrīqīyā). However, a leadership dispute in 2016 led to a split between Boko Haram and the Islamic State West Africa Province (ISWAP), which subsequently emerged as rival jihadist factions.

== Background ==
Boko Haram is a salafi-jihadist militant group based in northeastern Nigeria and also active in Chad, Niger, northern Cameroon, and Mali.

Founded by Mohammed Yusuf in 2002, Boko Haram was led by Abubakar Shekau from 2009 until his death in 2021, although it splintered into other groups after Yusuf's death in 2009, as well as in 2015. When Boko Haram was first formed, their main goal was to "purify", meaning to spread Sunni Islam, and destroy Shia Islam in northern Nigeria, believing jihad should be delayed until Boko Haram was strong enough to overthrow the Nigerian government.

In August 2016, IS attempted to remove Shekau from his leadership role and replace him with Abu Musab al-Barnawi. ISIS attempted to remove Shekau because he had disobeyed Abu Bakr al-Baghdadi's order to cease targeting Muslim civilians. Shekau rejected the move, leading to a split between the groups. As of 2017, there were three factions which were all Boko Haram in origin, all rejecting "democracy, secularism and Western influence", and seeking to establish an Islamic state implementing sharia. These were the "West African Province" which is part of IS; "Jamā'at Ahl as-Sunnah lid-Da'wah wa'l-Jihād" (Boko Haram), under Shekau's control; and "Ansaru" which is loyal to al-Qaeda and rejected the caliphate of al-Bagdadi, though it shares his disapproval of the "wide-reaching interpretation of takfir" of Shekau.

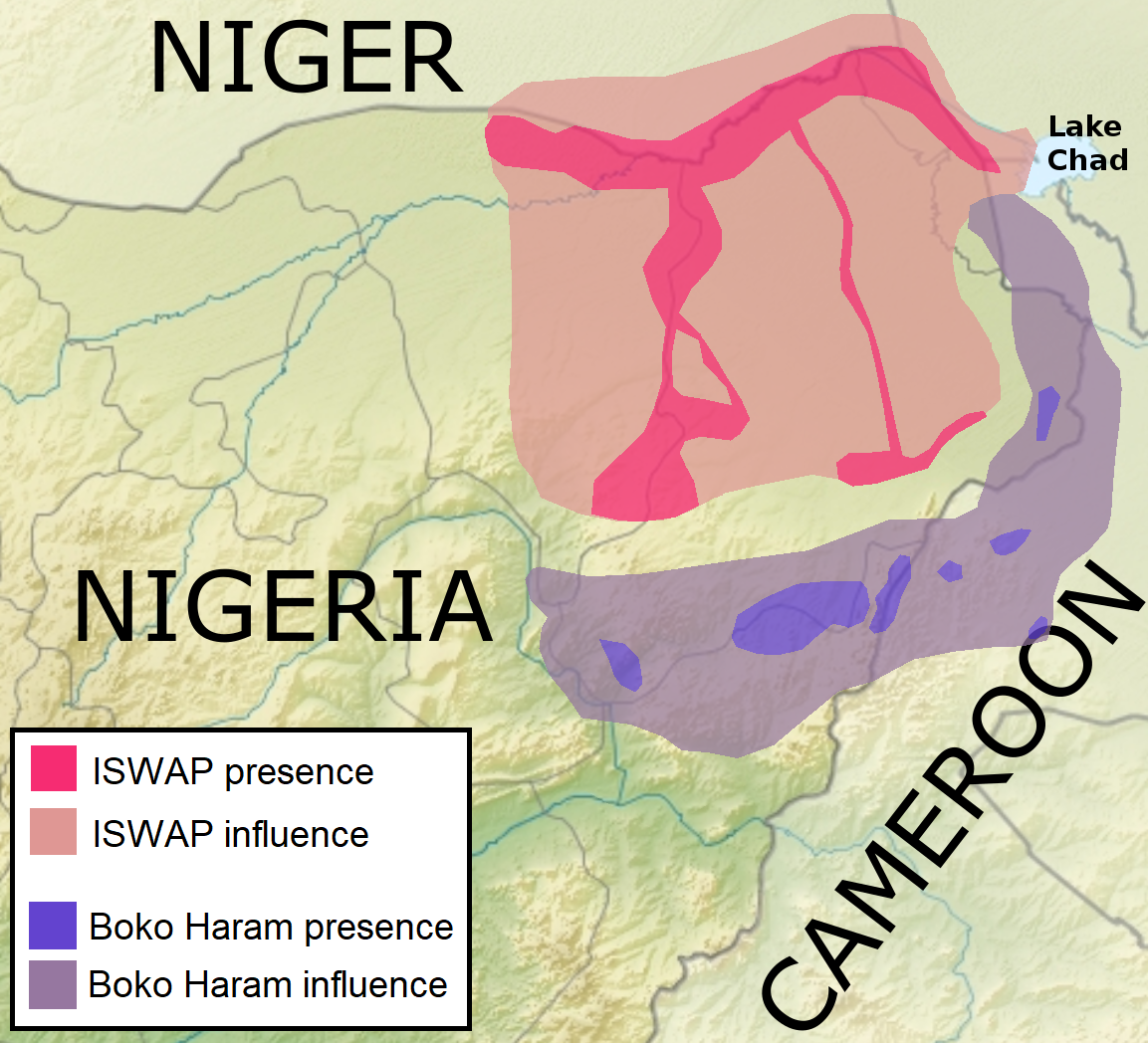
Boko Haram territorial control as of 2019

== Territorial control ==
According to Humangle Media, Boko Haram began to frame its zone of control as its daular (territory) in 2012, when Abubakar Shekau left Rijiyan Zaki in Kano State and established Boko Haram's base of operations in the Sambisa Forest.

In mid-2014, Boko Haram gained control of large swaths of territory in and around their home state of Borno (Nigeria), estimated at 50,000 square kilometres (20,000 sq mi) with a population of around 1.7 million people, but did not capture the state capital, Maiduguri, where Boko Haram was originally based. In late 2014, Boko Haram seized control of Bama, Borno, according to the town's residents. In early 2015 the Nigerian government to launch an offensive, and with the help of Chad, Niger, and Cameroon, they recaptured many areas that were formerly under the control of Boko Haram. In September 2015, the director of information at the Defence Headquarters of Nigeria claimed that all Boko Haram camps had been destroyed but attacks from Boko Haram continue.

In 2019, the president of Nigeria, Muhammadu Buhari, claimed that Boko Haram was "technically defeated". The Islamic State's West Africa Province seized the Sambisa Forest from Boko Haram in 2021, causing Boko Haram to flee south into Kaduna State, Nigeria. Despite this, Boko Haram experienced a subsequent revival under a new leader and victories in the battles of Toumbun Allura Kurnawa and Toumbun Gini in late 2022 and early 2023.

In October 2025, Boko Haram seized the Nigerian border town of Kirawa in Borno State, burning the district head's palace, a military base and dozens of homes, forcing more than around 5,000 people to flee into Cameroon.

In November 2025, clashes between between ISWAP and Boko Haram broke out in Lake Chad. The confrontation resulted in a significant Boko Haram victory, and the seizing of multiple ISWAP bases on the lake's islands.

== Government ==
As of 2015, Boko Haram has local leaders in each town or village where it has control. They operate a cell structure in northern Nigeria where they have members, concentrated in Borno State but with a presence that allegedly extended to Okene, Kogi State. Boko Haram also has a Shura Council with overall command of Boko Haram. Members could work relatively autonomous within small cells with their own leader, even if they were in contact with commanders higher up the hierarchy. Boko Haram also appointed alkalis (judges) and possibly other positions.

Boko Haram did not let people to leave their territory for Nigerian lands. They opened checkpoints on roads that lead from their territory to Nigeria, and they patrolled the rural areas, rarely they used donkeys or horses for patrol.

=== Financing ===
==== Kidnapping for ransom ====
Boko Haram is said to have raised substantial sums of money by kidnapping people for ransom. In 2013, Boko Haram kidnapped a family of seven French tourists while they were on vacation in Cameroon and two months later, Boko Haram released the hostages along with 16 others in exchange for a ransom of $3.15 million.

==== Extortion ====
In addition to extortion from local residents, Boko Haram has claimed to extort money from local state governments. A spokesman of Boko Haram claimed that Kano State governor Ibrahim Shekarau and Bauchi State governor Isa Yuguda had paid them monthly.

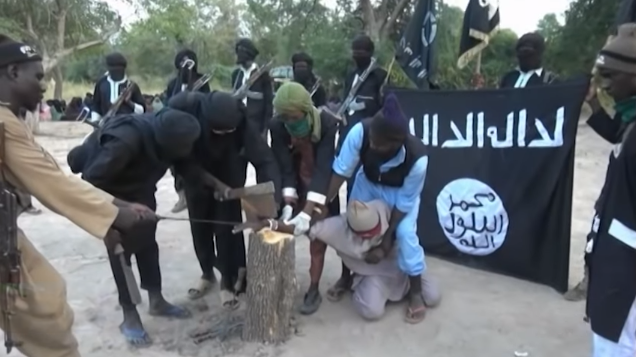
Boko Haram cutting the hand off of a man, 2017.

=== Slavery and human rights ===
Quasi-state-level jihadist groups, including Boko Haram and the Islamic State, have enslaved women and children, often for sexual slavery. In 2014 in particular, both groups organised mass kidnappings of large numbers of girls and younger women.

The first report of slave-taking by Boko Haram was on 13 May 2013 when a video was released of Boko Haram leader Abubakar Shekau saying his group had taken women and children, including teenage girls hostage in response to the arrest of its members' wives and children.

== See also ==
- Islamic Emirate of Somalia
- Islamic Emirate of Rafah
- Islamic Emirate of Yemen
- Islamic Emirate of Kunar
- Islamic Emirate of Kurdistan
- Territory of the Islamic State
