= Battle of the Sambisa Forest (2015-2016) =

Battle of Sambisa Forest (2015-2016)
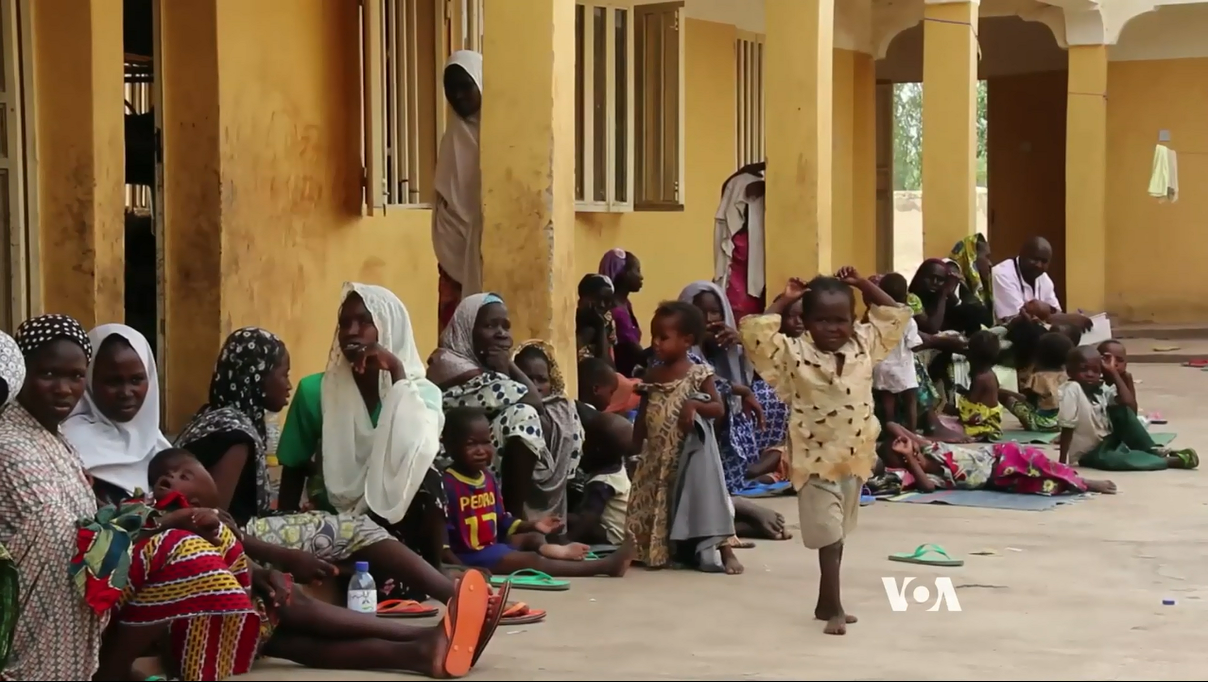
- Hostages freed from Boko Haram camps in the Sambisa Forest, May 2015.
Location
Result
Sambisa Forest, Borno State, Nigeria
Indecisive
- Both sides claim victory

Belligerents
Nigeria; Civilian Joint Task Force	Islamic State - West Africa Province; Boko Haram (from August 2016)

Commanders and leaders
Unknown	Abubakar Shekau

Strength
4,200 (December 2016)	Unknown

Casualties and losses
9+ killed (per Nigeria); 12 wounded (per Nigeria)	Several hundred killed
- Dozens of civilians killed 3,063+ hostages freed

Between 22 April 2015 and 23 December 2016, the Nigerian Army attempted to push the Islamic State – West Africa Province (ISWAP) and later Abubakar Shekau's Boko Haram out of the fortress-like Sambisa Forest in Borno State, Nigeria. By December 2016, both sides had claimed victory.

== Background ==
The Sambisa Forest is a sprawling jungle in the center of northeast Nigeria's Borno State, which has been embroiled in an insurgency by Boko Haram since 2009. In the 2015 West African offensive that pushed Boko Haram (which became the Islamic State's West Africa Province, or ISWAP, on 7 March) out of major urban areas, the group's fighters retreated to the Sambisa Forest for a last stand. The Nigerian Army and pro-government Civilian Joint Task Force (CJTF) militiamen began concentrating forces around the forest in late March. In response, Boko Haram heavily mined the area.

== Battle ==
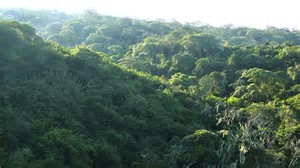
The Sambisa Forest from above.

The first incursion by Nigerian forces into Sambisa occurred on 22 April, when three CJTF militiamen were killed by mines set by ISWAP. The army then withdrew to Bama. A CJTF militiaman said that five CJTF militiamen and two soldiers had been killed by 23 April. Six days later on 28 April, the Nigerian army launched a second incursion into the forest, claiming to have freed 200 girls and 93 women from a Boko Haram camp. Many of the women and girls had been forcefully kidnapped from urban areas that ISWAP retreated from, or from previous kidnapping raids. The Nigerian government stated on 29 April that another 160 women were freed and thirteen ISWAP camps were captured. The women were being held in "very harsh and inhumane conditions." On 1 May, another 275 women and children were freed and transferred to Adamawa State. At least ten women of these 270 died on the way to freedom.

One of the survivors freed, an 18-year-old girl named Binta Abdullahi, said "When the military stormed the camp where we were being held, our captors told us to take refuge under the trees and bushes to escape the army's bombardment. Women who had hidden under the trees were crushed by tanks that advanced without knowing they were there ... At least three women and some soldiers were killed in the explosion of a mine that a woman had stepped on."

On 17 May, the Nigerian Army claimed to have captured another camp in the forest. One soldier was killed by a mine and two others were injured in the battle. Five days later on 22 May, another battle took place leaving dozens of jihadists dead according to the Nigerian Army, and 20 women and children rescued. One soldier was killed and ten were wounded. Between March and June 2015, an unknown number of hostages died being freed by Nigerian forces or attempting to escape from ISWAP camps. Many of these hostages died by the many mines planted, and a 2017 report in Studies in Conflict & Terrorism said that many of these deaths could have been prevented if the Nigerian Army had adequate numbers of minesweeper vehicles.

On 18 August, Nigerian forces from the 26th Task Force Brigade based in Gwoza clashed with several motorcycles and seven pick-ups driven by ISWAP fighters. The fighters were fleeing prolonged aerial bombardment by the Nigerian Air Force on the forest, which had smoked the fighters out of their bunkers after weeks of reconnaissance.

The Nigerian Army launched raids into the villages of Bulajilin and Manawashe, on the edge of the Sambisa Forest, on 27 October. The raids killed 30 jihadists and freed 338 people. This same month, Nigerian jets bombed ISWAP ammunition dumps and vehicle depots in rural areas of the forest in its Sambisa Game Reserve. The Nigerian Air Force had attempted to use unmanned reconnaissance systems in October as well.

=== 2016 ===
In January 2016, the Nigerian government destroyed several low-profile ISWAP facilities in Gadzama, Ngwalimiri, Dure and Dure Takwalla, Ajigin, Bitta, Gulumba Gana, Sigel, Damasak, Kumshe, Yajiwa, Asaga, Tumbun Gin, and Mada communities through airstrikes. By May 2016, the extent of what ISWAP controlled in Borno State was unclear. However, the International Crisis Group said that "What seems clear is that it retains presence and capacity in some rural areas, including several permanent bases, particularly in the Sambisa forest, along the borders with Cameroon and Niger and on Lake Chad islets, from where it can launch raids, including into neighbouring states." On 19 May 2016, the Nigerian Army announced that they freed 97 women and children in a raid in the forest.

In October 2016, the Nigerian Army launched an operation called Operation Forest Storm to fully clear out ISWAP and Boko Haram (which had broken off from the group in August 2016) from the Sambisa Forest. About 4,200 soldiers took part in the operation. Between 14 and 21 December 2016, the Nigerian government announced the liberation of 1,880 hostages, 564 jihadists taken prisoner, and 19 surrendered. In its statement, the Nigerian Army also declared that Camp Zero, dubbed the "last enclave" of Boko Haram in the forest, was captured.

In a video published on 29 December 2016, Abubakar Shekau, leader of Boko Haram, published a video saying that he and his fighters were still in the forest.
