= Battle of Baroua =

- Part of Boko Haram insurgency
Date	August 24, 2021
Location	Baroua, Diffa Region, Niger
Result	Nigerien victory

Belligerents
Niger; MNJTF	Boko Haram

Commanders and leaders
Abdul Khalifah Ibrahim	Unknown

Units involved
Sector 4 Diffa	Unknown

Casualties and losses
16 killed 9 injured	43–50 killed

On August 24, 2021, clashes broke out between Boko Haram fighters and Nigerien forces in the town of Baroua, Diffa Region, Niger. The battle was instigated after a contingent of ISWAP fighters assaulted a Nigerien position, but were defeated. The clash was part of a larger conflict between Boko Haram remnants and ISWAP in Diffa Region that had begun after the death of Abubakar Shekau.

== Background ==
After the violent split between ISWAP and Boko Haram (which renamed to JAS) at the battle of Sambisa Forest in May that led to the death of Boko Haram leader Abubakar Shekau, civilians living in Boko Haram-controlled areas in Niger began defecting to Nigerien government-controlled areas while ISWAP attempted to consolidate areas held by the remains of Boko Haram. The Sambisa forest in northeastern Nigeria, Boko Haram's main base, fell under ISWAP control during the battle, and many Boko Haram fighters relocated to the Lake Chad island of Baroua. ISWAP fighters blocked access to Baroua, sparking further clashes between the two groups in July and August 2021.

In June 2021, 6,000 people returned to Baroua as part of a Nigerien government program to return refugees displaced by Boko Haram attacks in 2015. At the time of the battle, the Nigerien government stated nineteen villages including Baroua were under increased protection by the MNJTF.

== Battle ==
Nigerien defense minister Alkassoum Indatou stated that a contingent of Boko Haram fighters attacked the MNJTF base in Baroua, which was being defended by the Sector 4 Diffa group led by Major General Abdul Khalifah Ibrahim. Local pro-government Facebook groups reported that the Nigerien forces repelled the attack, which was confirmed by the Nigerien government and the MNJTF. The MNJTF reported that at least forty-three Boko Haram fighters were killed, a commander was captured, and a large quantity of weapons and ammo were seized. Indatou stated that around fifty jihadists were killed or injured. Sixteen Nigerien soldiers were killed in the attack and nine others were injured.
