= Operation Hadin Kai =

Nigerian military counter-insurgency campaign

- Part of Boko Haram insurgency
Date	2015 – present
Location	Northeastern Nigeria, Lake Chad Basin
Status	Ongoing

Belligerents
(Nigeria) Nigerian Armed Forces; United States (from 2026)	(Islamic State) Boko Haram

Operation Hadin Kai (formerly known as Operation Lafiya Dole) is a Nigerian military counter-insurgency campaign conducted by the Nigerian Armed Forces against Boko Haram and associated armed groups in northeastern Nigeria and the Lake Chad Basin. The operation was launched in 2015 when the Nigerian Army replaced Operation Zaman Lafiya with Operation Lafiya Dole, a code name for the country’s ongoing military efforts against the insurgency. In late April 2021, the Nigerian Army announced that the campaign was redesignated as Operation Hadin Kai, with “Hadin Kai” meaning cooperation or unity in Hausa, in line with leadership’s intent to reposition and adjust the focus of the counter-insurgency effort.

== Background ==
The Boko Haram insurgency began in northeastern Nigeria in the late 2000s and escalated significantly after 2010, leading to widespread violence, mass displacement, and the loss of territorial control by the Nigerian state in parts of Borno, Yobe, and Adamawa states. By 2014, Boko Haram had seized and administered several local government areas, prompting heightened domestic and international concern over Nigeria’s security situation.

In response to the deteriorating security environment, the Nigerian military launched a series of counter-insurgency operations. One of the major early efforts was Operation Zaman Lafiya, introduced in 2013, which sought to suppress insurgent activity through increased troop deployments and coordinated military action.

In 2015, following a change in Nigeria’s political leadership and a reassessment of military strategy, Operation Zaman Lafiya was replaced by Operation Lafiya Dole. The new designation was introduced as part of a broader reorganization of the counter-insurgency campaign, with an emphasis on sustained offensive pressure against Boko Haram, improved coordination among military units, and closer cooperation with regional partners operating under the Multinational Joint Task Force.

The counter-insurgency campaign has taken place within the wider Lake Chad Basin region, where Boko Haram has operated across national borders. Separate from Nigeria’s internal military operations, regional military efforts involving Nigeria, Cameroon, Chad, and Niger were initiated in early 2015 to address cross-border insurgent activity in the area.

== Renaming to Operation Hadin Kai ==
In April 2021, the Nigerian Army officially changed the code name of its counter-insurgency campaign in the northeast from Operation Lafiya Dole to Operation Hadin Kai. According to military communications reported by multiple media outlets, the renaming was approved by then-Chief of Army Staff Lieutenant General Ibrahim Attahiru, reflecting a shift in operational posture and an emphasis on cooperation among security forces. “Hadin Kai” is a Hausa phrase that means cooperation or unity.

== Reported activities ==
While detailed operational reports are seldom published in full by the military, some specific instances associated with the campaign have been documented:

- In May 2018, during the period when the campaign operated under the name Operation Lafiya Dole, Nigerian Army units engaged Boko Haram fighters in northern Borno State, killing 15 insurgents and rescuing 49 civilians, including women and children, from insurgent hideouts.
- Reporting on Operation Hadin Kai has noted continued efforts to rescue abducted civilians and reduce insurgent activity in the region. According to Voice of America, the campaign facilitated the rescue and handover of former captives to authorities in Borno State.
- On May 16 2026 the United 2026 United States began a series of joint Airstrikes in support of the Nigerian campaign

== See also ==
- Boko Haram insurgency
- 2026 United States intervention in Nigeria
- 2025 United States strikes in Nigeria
