= Battle of Sambisa Forest (2021) =

Battle between ISWAP and Boko Haram in northeastern Nigeria in 2021

- Part of the Boko Haram insurgency and the Boko Haram–ISWAP conflict
Date	14–19 May 2021
Location	Sambisa Forest, Borno State, Nigeria 11°15′00″N 13°25′00″E
Result	ISWAP victory
Territorial changes	Sambisa Forest is captured by ISWAP

Belligerents
Boko Haram	Islamic State; West Africa Province (ISWAP)

Commanders and leaders
Abubakar Shekau ‡‡	(Islamic State) Abu Musab al-Barnawi (Islamic State) Muhammad Dawud (Islamic State) Bako Gorgore (probably †) (Islamic State) Dana Daguri

Units involved
Unknown	Military of IS: Lake Chad units; "Timbuktu Governorate" units (Note: A border area between Nigeria's Borno and Yobe states is known as the "Timbuktu Triangle". It should not be confused with the city of Timbuktu in Mali.)

Strength
Unknown; Several suicide bombers Some technicals	Dozens of technicals

Casualties and losses
Many killed, many others defected; several executed	Several killed
- Location of Sambisa Forest Sambisa Forest (Africa)

In May 2021, the Islamic State's West Africa Province (ISWAP) launched an invasion of the Sambisa Forest in Borno State, Nigeria, which was serving as the main base of Boko Haram, a rival jihadist rebel group. Following heavy fighting, ISWAP overran the Boko Haram troops, cornering their leader Abubakar Shekau. The two sides entered negotiations about Boko Haram's surrender during which Shekau committed suicide, possibly detonating himself with a suicide vest. Shekau's death was regarded as a major event by outside observers, as he had been one of the main driving forces in the Islamist insurgency in Nigeria and neighboring countries since 2009.

== Background ==
Salafi jihadist Boko Haram is centred in Borno State in northeastern Nigeria. It launched an insurgency against the Nigerian government following an unsuccessful uprising in 2009. Supported by several other jihadist groups including al-Qaeda, the group aimed at establishing an Islamic state in northern Nigeria. From 2012, the Sambisa Forest became the center of Boko Haram's self-proclaimed territory. Boko Haram extended its actions into Cameroon, Chad and Niger during the mid 2010s, greatly increasing its power and territorial holdings in the Chad Basin in 2014. Its de facto leader Abubakar Shekau consequently attempted to increase his international standing among Islamists by allying with the prominent Islamic State (IS). Boko Haram thus became the "Islamic State's West Africa Province" (ISWAP).

When the insurgents were subsequently defeated and lost almost all of their lands during the 2015 West African offensive by the Multinational Joint Task Force (MJTF), discontent grew among the rebels. Despite orders by the IS central command to stop using women and children suicide bombers as well as refrain from mass murdering civilians, Shekau refused to change his tactics. Researcher Aymenn Jawad Al-Tamimi summarized that the Boko Haram leader proved to be "too extreme even by the Islamic State's standards". Shekau had always refused to fully submit to the IS central command, and the latter consequently removed him as leader of ISWAP in August 2016. Shekau responded by breaking with the IS central command, but many of the rebels actually stayed loyal to IS. As result, the rebel movement split into a Shekau-loyal faction ("Jama'at Ahl al-sunna li-l-Da'wa wa-l-Jihad", generally known as "Boko Haram"), and a pro-IS faction led by Abu Musab al-Barnawi (which continued to call itself "Islamic State's West Africa Province"). These two groups have since clashed with each other, though they possibly occasionally cooperated against the local governments. In addition, Shekau never officially renounce his pledge of allegiance to IS as a whole; his forces are thus occasionally regarded as "second branch of ISWAP". Overall, the relation of Shekau with IS remained confused and ambiguous.

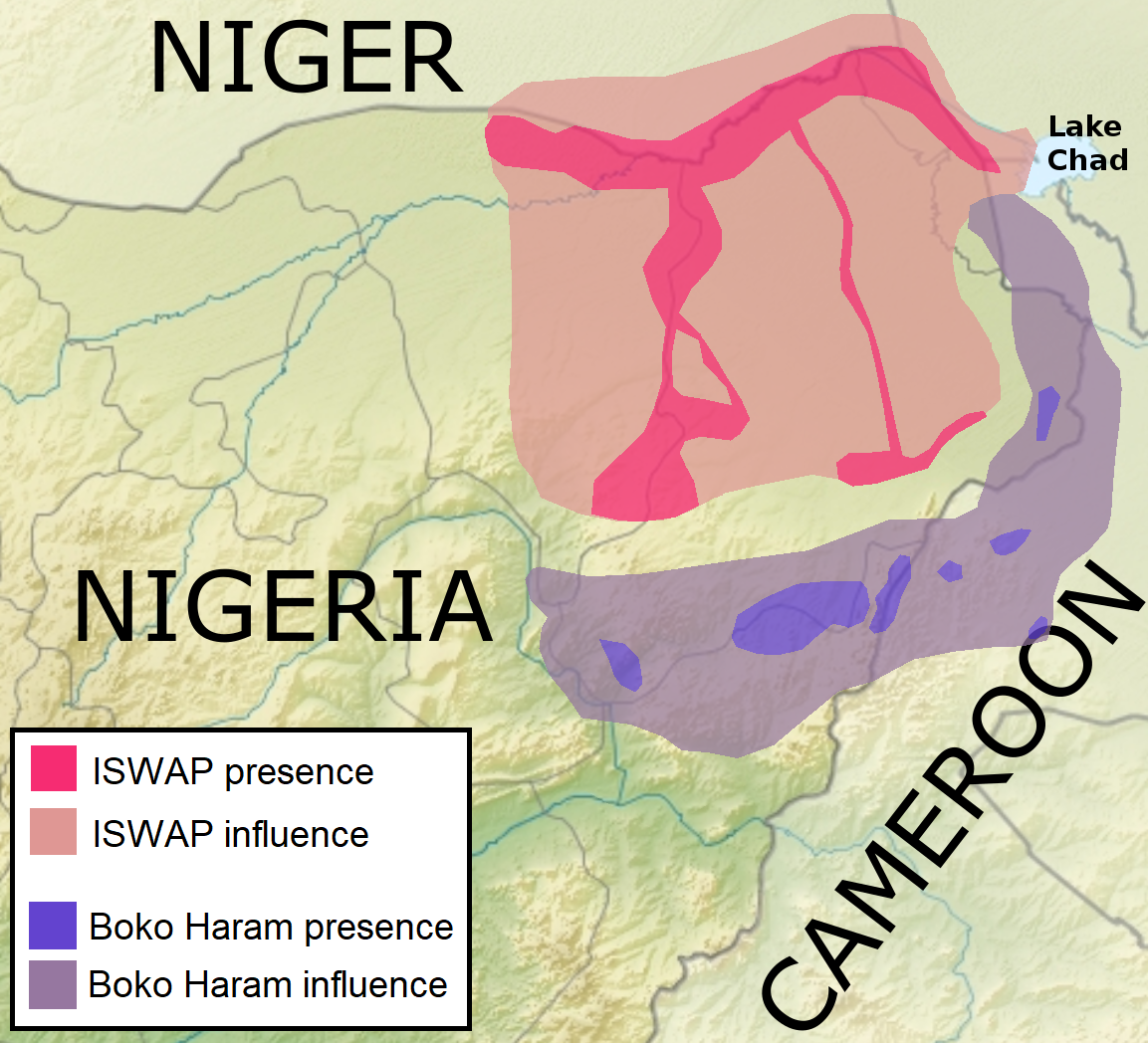
Presence and influence of ISWAP and Boko Haram in northern Nigeria, Cameroon, and Niger in early 2019

In the next years, Barnawi's ISWAP and Shekau's Boko Haram both reconsolidated, though ISWAP grew into the more powerful group. Whereas Shekau had about 1,000 to 2,000 fighters under his command by 2019, the Islamic State loyalists counted up to 5,000 troops. Furthermore, ISWAP displayed signs of increasing sophistication and growing connections to the IS core group. Barnawi's followers did not just align ideologically with IS, but also adopted its technologies and tactics. They began using suicide vehicle-borne improvised explosive devices and drones which experts considered evidence of support and advice by exiled IS members from Syria and Iraq.

ISWAP also focused on military targets and attempted to win the support of the local civilians, unlike Shekau whose forces were notorious for massacring and kidnapping non-combatants. The Islamic State employed a "hearts and minds" policy toward the local communities, gradually winning substantial grassroots support, and implemented its own government, including collecting taxes. Despite not fully controlling the areas where it is present, ISWAP maintains more control over large swaths of the countryside than the Nigerian government and has created four governorates. It offers some "limited services", and encourages locals to live in de facto rebel-held communities. At the same time, it has targeted agencies providing humanitarian aid, thereby depriving locals of basic necessities in government-held areas. However, Shekau's group would often raid communities under ISWAP protection, and punish civilians who had cooperated with the Islamic State. This further motivated ISWAP to eventually deal with Boko Haram one way or another. Al-Naba, the Islamic State's official newspaper, later claimed that Shekau's activities had disrupted local communities to such a degree that famine had become a major issue, allegedly making an intervention of ISWAP necessary.

ISWAP followed a reconciliatory approach in regards to Shekau's followers. Whereas Boko Haram usually executed captured ISWAP fighters as traitors, ISWAP would only disarm and preach to captured Boko Haram troops before releasing them. This resulted in many of Shekau's fighters developing sympathies for the Islamic State faction. ISWAP repeatedly stated that it was only opposed to Shekau, arguing that they had no issues with other Boko Haram members. In addition, the Islamic State faction deviated from Shekau's brutal and autocratic leadership style by organizing a powerful shura or committee that gave the group an element of "democracy". As a result, ISWAP gained more popular support, yet also became more prone to leadership struggles. In the course of the Chad Basin campaign (2018–2020), a violent dispute among ISWAP resulted in the deposition of Abu Musab al-Barnawi and the execution of several commanders.

== Prelude ==
By 2021, ISWAP had surpassed Shekau's group in numbers, weaponry, and "ability". It began to expand its holdings across northern Nigeria and Cameroon. As the Islamic State forces clashed with Boko Haram, the former generally emerged better off. Meanwhile, Shekau's group was weakened in clashes with the Nigerian Armed Forces and the military of Chad. Several Boko Haram commanders defected to ISWAP, some of which began to operate as spies within Shekau's force.

In February 2021, ISWAP and Boko Haram engaged in a battle at the Niger–Nigeria border after the former had abducted women who were linked to the latter. Around this time, a faction of ISWAP also defected to al-Qaeda. The violence between ISWAP and Boko Haram further escalated after the former had tried to convince the latter to change its tendency to overuse takfir (non-believer) designations. The Nigerian newspaper Vanguard stated that ISWAP had previously sent especially loyal troops for training to Libya, Somalia, and Syria; these forces returned to Nigeria in March and April, greatly bolstering the local Islamic State forces and allowing them to operate more aggressively against Boko Haram.

In April 2021, Boko Haram ambushed an ISWAP brigade, killing several militants. Around this time, dissatisfaction within Boko Haram reportedly rose due to Shekau executing his chief of staff Abu Fatima. The inter-rebel fighting was paused during Ramadan. Around mid-May, ISWAP released an audio declaring that Abu Musab al-Barnawi had been reinstated by the IS central command as "caretaker" leader of ISWAP. As al-Barnawi had been the one to depose Shekau in the first place, analyst Jacob Zenn argued that this move was a sign that both the IS central command and ISWAP wanted to finally eliminate Shekau. At the same time, the shura and sectional leaderships of ISWAP were temporarily dissolved. Vanguard claimed that delegates of the IS central command had visited ISWAP shortly before the offensive against Sambisa Forest. Al-Naba also vaguely stated in an article that ISWAP had been ordered to eliminate Shekau, hinting that the IS central leadership had been involved in the decision making process. Conspiracy theories circulated which alleged that non-Jihadist outside powers had been involved in the escalation of the inter-rebel conflict, arguing that it was part of a wider rivalry between "Anglophone Nigeria and its Francophone neighbors".

The Islamic State forces moved their civilian followers to more secure locations around Kukawa in preparation of the anti-Shekau operation.

== Battle ==
=== Early ISWAP offensive ===
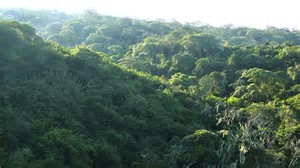
Photo of Sambisa Forest. The forest consists of a mixture of open woodland and areas with very dense vegetation.

ISWAP began its offensive on 14 May, targeting four minor camps as well as Shekau's main base located in the Sambisa Forest. While al-Barnawi acted as ISWAP chief commander, Muhammad Dawud (alias "Abu Hafsat") coordinated the offensive alongside Islamic State officers of the Lake Chad area, Timbuktu triangle and Marte. One of the most important frontline officers involved in the operation was Bako Gorgore, ISWAP's Timbuktu governor and commander. ISWAP would use "mobile columns" to great effect during the battle, gradually cornering Shekau's loyalists. The ISWAP columns reportedly contained many fighters who were very familiar with the Sambisa Forest and Shekau's "routine".

According to al-Naba, the ISWAP troops launched a nightly attack from late 14 May, intending to surprise the Boko Haram defenders. Even though the ISWAP troops had to cross mine fields, the plan succeeded, and they were able to strike at Shekau's main base early during the next day. Boko Haram responded with mortar fire and used several suicide bombers, one of them in a car, to halt ISWAP's advance. However, the ISWAP militants reportedly managed to kill most suicide bombers before they reached them, with only three succeeding in detonating themselves, inflicting only minor damage. After ISWAP had inflicted heavy losses on Boko Haram including two vehicles destroyed, the base's defenders fled. However, ISWAP failed to capture Shekau during this clash as it had initially intended to do. The Islamic State troops spent the remaining day securing the captured Boko Haram base. According to al-Jazeera, both sides lost several fighters during the confrontation.

On 16 May, ISWAP began to eliminate the remaining Boko Haram resistance. Using motorcycles and dozens of technicals outfitted with heavy weapons, ISWAP chased the Boko Haram troops outside the bases, killing many and convincing more to surrender. Several Boko Haram "top fighters" outright defected. According to an alleged insider account, up to 70% of Boko Haram's qaids (senior commanders) had secretly sided with ISWAP by the time of the operation. One group of Boko Haram loyalists, counting "dozens" according to al-Naba, holed up at the well defendable Ghowbra camp. ISWAP attacked the camp but broke off the assault after an hour of fighting. ISWAP spent the next day securing the captured areas, continuing to search for Shekau, and patrolling through the forest with voice amplifiers announcing its aims and requesting Boko Haram stragglers to surrender. On 18 May, Shekau gave a final sermon. His tone indicated he knew that he "was near the end". The sermon suggested that many Boko Haram fighters had been killed, but Shekau also reaffirmed that he "would never be loyal to anybody". He also reaffirmed his ideological stances. However, the Boko Haram leader claimed that he had never rebelled against Abu Ibrahim al-Hashimi al-Qurashi, the Islamic State's caliph, blaming his local rivals for the rebel infighting.

=== Shekau's death and end of the ISWAP operation ===
According to HumAngle, a website "run by well-informed Nigerian reporters", Shekau and his remaining followers attempted to flee from a temporary camp on late 19 May 2021, but were encircled by ISWAP troops led by Dana Daguri. The Islamic State fighters confronted Shekau's personal bodyguards, resulting in heavy fighting and ending with the eventual death of several bodyguards. In contrast, al-Naba claimed that the ISWAP troops had discovered Shekau's motorized column by 17 May and attacked it, culminating in Shekau and a few followers fleeing further into the forest on foot. According to this telling of the events, Shekau and seven of his followers were cornered at "a large tree" after two days of searching by ISWAP.

Shekau preferred to be humiliated in the afterlife than getting humiliated on earth, and he killed himself instantly by detonating an explosive.

— Abu Musab al-Barnawi on Abubakar Shekau's suicide

In any case, facing imminent defeat, Shekau began to negotiate with the Islamic State fighters on 19 May 2021. Bako Gorgore and another ISWAP officer reportedly approached him, and implored the Boko Haram leader as well as his aides to remove their suicide vests. Analyst Ahmad Salkida argued that ISWAP wanted Shekau alive, as only he could convince his remaining followers to voluntarily join the Islamic State forces. (Note: One intelligence source instead argued that the operation aimed at killing Shekau for his "unprovoked attack" on Islamic State forces in the previous weeks.) ISWAP demanded Shekau to swear an oath of allegiance to al-Barnawi, voluntarily relinquish power, and to order his remaining troops to join ISWAP. Five of Shekau's companions allegedly agreed to surrender, leaving only the Boko Haram leader and one of his aides. After one to several hours of talks, however, Shekau committed suicide with a gun, grenade or suicide belt. According to HumAngle, Shekau detonated a suicide vest in the middle of the negotiations, killing one or more ISWAP commanders present. HumanAngle stated that Shekau had first ordered one of his aides to detonate his vest, whereupon an ISWAP officer shot the aide. The Boko Haram commander then exploded his own vest, killing Bako Gorgore. This "dramatic" action surprised ISWAP. Al-Naba agreed with HumanAngle's version of Shekau's death, though it did not mention the death of an ISWAP commander. Additionally, conflicting sources indicate that Bako Gorgore survived the operation, and was killed in March of 2026.

Shekau's death marked the official end of the ISWAP offensive. The remaining Boko Haram fighters present reportedly joined ISWAP, with the defenders of the Ghowbra camp reportedly "rushing to announce repentance" after learning of Shekau's demise. In course and after the battle, "a significant proportion if not the majority" of Shekau's faction ended up defecting to ISWAP. Al-Naba claimed that "thousands" of Shekau's followers surrendered, although it did not state how many of these were militants. According to Vanguard, several leading Boko Haram commanders refused to surrender, and were consequently hunted down by ISWAP. About 30 Boko Haram commanders were reportedly captured including Mustapha Krimima Jaysh, Ba'akaka, Malkin Tijjani, Hirasama, and Mallam Ballu. ISWAP technicals continued security sweeps in Sambisa Forest, killing Boko Haram stragglers. Islamic State commanders and surrendered Boko Haram leaders reportedly held talks at the Sabeel Huda camp in the forest's center; journalist Kingsley Omonobi stated that ISWAP chief judge Muhammad Malumma was rumoured to be the one deciding the fate of captured Boko Haram troops. Ten Boko Haram senior commanders were reportedly executed.

ISWAP also captured large amounts of weaponry at Shekau's camp, while many ISWAP fighters were able to reunite with their families who had been seized by Shekau and held at the Sambisa Forest camps after the rebel splintering. Meanwhile, al-Barnawi was declared ISWAP's official commander for the Sambisa area, and proclaimed a ceasefire with the Nigerian Armed Forces so that ISWAP could hunt down all remaining Boko Haram forces. ISWAP also produced a propaganda video in which it showcased ex-Boko Haram troops pledging allegiance to ISWAP and IS caliph Abu Ibrahim al-Hashimi al-Qurashi in the Sambisa Forest.

== Aftermath ==
There were initially considerable doubts about the claims of Shekau's demise, as he had been repeatedly declared dead in previous years, only to resurface. After the Sambisa Forest clash, Nigerian intelligence agencies "confirmed" his death, whereas the Nigerian Armed Forces still awaited firm proof. Journalist John Owen Nwachukwu argued that Shekau had usually appeared in videos or audio messages directly after claims of his death had circulated. However, no messages by him were released, and Boko Haram also remained silent on the issue, providing credence to the latest report of his end. In early June, ISWAP officially declared that Shekau had killed himself during the fighting in Sambisa Forest. Soon after, Nigerian security expert Kabir Adamu said about Shekau's death that "every sort of source that could confirm the information has verified that it is true". In mid June, Shekau's loyalists confirmed his death.

Analyst Bulama Bukarti argued that "Shekau's death will be a huge turning point", as it could either worsen the fighting between the Boko Haram remnants and ISWAP or result in the merger of the former into the latter and the reunification of the insurgents. Zenn argued that Boko Haram might continue as separate faction, as Shekau had a second-in-command of unknown identity who was probably still alive. Reactions by "observers of the conflict" were generally mixed, as Shekau had been eliminated not by the security forces but by ISWAP. Jason Burke commented that the Islamic State had managed "something Nigerian forces, despite the dispatch of multinational taskforces put together by western governments and vast sums of aid, had been unable to do in 12 years of fighting". In contrast, local civilians were celebrating, hoping that Shekau had indeed been killed. In late June, IS spokesman Abu Hamza al-Qurashi held a speech in which he commended ISWAP for killing Shekau.

With Sambisa Forest under its control, ISWAP reportedly holds a large area in Borno State and has created a chain of strongholds from Nigeria to Mali to southern Libya. The forest also offers ISWAP a relatively secure haven, protecting it from airstrikes. Having captured Sambisa, ISWAP also controls all roads to the strategically important, government-held city of Maiduguri. ISWAP initially continued to pressure the remaining Boko Haram loyalists, clashing with them at the Niger–Nigeria border as well as Cameroon–Nigeria border. The Boko Haram remnants were reportedly consolidating under Bakura Sahalaba who had begun to launch counter-attacks on ISWAP targets in the Lake Chad area, prompting al-Barnawi to implore Shekau's former followers to lay down arms and join the Islamic State. Bakura Sahalaba later released a video in which he condemned ISWAP for being responsible for Shekau's death, and reaffirmed that Boko Haram would continue to fight. Regardless, researcher Aymenn Jawad Al-Tamimi argued that the Shekau faction "has been effectively defeated". Over the next year, however, the Boko Haram remnant groups experienced a limited revival. Led by Bakura Doro, the Boko Haram loyalists sought to kill Abu Musab for his role in Shekau's death.

Some Boko Haram members who initially joined ISWAP after Shekau's death, such as a faction led by four commanders of the Njimiya camp, later rebelled again and waged a low-level anti-IS guerrilla campaign in Sambisa Forest. This dissident group eventually surrendered to security forces in December 2022, having been defeated by the Islamic State loyalists.
