= Abu Musab al-Barnawi =

Nigerian Islamic militant

- Born: Habib Yusuf; Borno or Yobe, Nigeria
- Died: Possibly 2023; Possibly Kaduna
- Military career
- Allegiance: Boko Haram (2002–2013, ?–2015); Ansaru (c. 2013); Islamic State – West Africa Province (from 2015)
- Rank: Leader of ISWAP (formerly); Head of the ISWAP's shura; Member of the IS global shura (allegedly)
- Conflicts: Boko Haram insurgency; Boko Haram–ISWAP conflict; Battle of Sambisa Forest (2021); Battles of Toumbun Allura Kurnawa and Toumbun Gini

Abu Musab al-Barnawi, born Habib Yusuf, is or was a Nigerian Islamic militant who served as the leader of the Islamic State's branch in West Africa (ISWAP) between August 2016 and March 2019, and again around May 2021. He also served in various other capacities within ISWAP such as head of its shura. Before pledging allegiance to IS, al-Barnawi was the spokesperson for Boko Haram. Multiple sources reported that Abu Musab was killed in 2021, but later research by the Crisis Group, Humangle Media, and others proved that these claims were inaccurate. Later research by Humangle Media suggested that he had killed himself during a raid by security forces in 2023.

== Early life and Boko Haram membership ==
Abu Musab al-Barnawi was generally believed to be the second eldest son of the founder of Boko Haram, Mohammed Yusuf, (Note: However, the view that Abu Musab al-Barnawi was Mohammed Yusuf's son has been disputed by some researchers. Akali Omeni argued that Abu Musab was probably a relative of the Boko Haram founder, but not his son, as he would be too young for the various positions he was appointed in Boko Haram.) with the birth name Habib Yusuf. According to his nom de guerre which includes al-Barnawi ("from Borno"), Abu Musab was born in Nigeria's Borno State. Researcher Akali Omeni alternatively suggested that al-Barnawi did not refer to Abu Musab's place of birth, but instead his lineage. According to this view, Abu Musab was born in Yobe State just like his father Mohammed Yusuf. His exact birth date is unclear; Omeni speculated that Abu Musab was probably born around the 1980s or 1990s. Abu Musab had several siblings, including an older brother named Yusuf.

In 2009, Mohammed Yusuf launched a failed uprising; he was captured and killed in police custody. His militant group subsequently fell under the command of Abubakar Shekau. Following Mohammed Yusuf's death, most of his children were moved out of Nigeria to protect them; only Abu Musab's older brother Yusuf remained behind and was killed by Nigerian security forces in 2010. Meanwhile, Abu Musab and his siblings were relocated to Kusiri in Cameroon and then N'Djamena in Chad where they received a religious education under Sudanese and Chadian tutors. In 2012, Boko Haram entrenched itself in the Sambisa Forest and declared this area their daular (territory). Abubakar Shekau ordered Mohammed Yusuf's children to be relocated into the Boko Haram-held area; according to researcher Ahmad Salkida this was a "deliberate effort to consolidate legitimacy by reabsorbing Yusuf's lineage into the insurgency's core".

Now living in rebel-held territory, Abu Musab gained prominence as he was gradually assigned roles which bridged "doctrinal leadership and battlefield command". His developing role was not just attributed to his parentage, but his personal qualities as he was religiously well educated. He was respected as someone who "embod[ied] knowledge and steadiness" in the rebel group. He was eventually appointed as Boko Haram's spokesperson, and gradually rose in the ranks of the rebel group. He became one of the group's chief commanders and a close advisor of Shekau. However, Abu Musab was more moderate than Shekau, disagreeing with the latter's use of women and children as suicide bombers as well as the indiscriminate killing of Muslim civilians. The two frequently clashed, and Abu Musab even temporarily defected to Ansaru, a Boko Haram splinter group, in 2013. On 27 January 2015, he released a propaganda video for Boko Haram, having rejoined the group.

== Islamic State ==
On 7 March 2015, Abubakar Shekau released an audio message in which he pledged allegiance to Abu Bakr al-Baghdadi and the Islamic State. Shekau was reaffirmed as the leader of the branch in an IS video released in April 2016. Despite this, unrest among his forces caused a large force of dissidents, led by Abu Musab al-Barnawi and his stepfather Mamman Nur, to break off and relocate to Lake Chad. On 21 June 2016, Reuters reported Marine Lieutenant General Thomas Waldhauser as saying "Several months ago, about half of Boko Haram broke off to a separate group because they were not happy with the amount of buy-in, if you will, from Boko Haram into the IS brand," Shekau ignored IS orders to stop using children as suicide bombers. "He's been told by ISIL to stop doing that. But he has not done so. And that's one of the reasons why this splinter group has broken off," he said, adding Islamic State was trying to "reconcile those two groups." However, the fracture ultimately resulted in the reemergence of a separate faction, generally called "Boko Haram", led by Shekau, and opposed to IS and ISWAP. The Islamic State central initially continued its attempts to reconcile the infighting factions, to no avail.

On 3 August 2016, the Islamic State reported in the 41st issue of its newspaper al-Naba, that Abu Musab al-Barnawi had been appointed the new leader of their West African branch. In response, Shekau declared that he and his followers were in the right, and that "[they] will not accept any emissary except the one we can attest he is sincere and truthful for Allah and His cause". Abu Musab promised in an interview with al-Naba that he would not target mosques or markets in northern Nigeria. The difference in these approaches is due to Barnawi considering the general population in the region to be Muslim whereas Shekau considered them to be non-believers. Shekau responded by declaring Abu Musab and his followers "infidels", whereupon Abu Musab accused Shekau of apostasy and, together with his brother, published a book titled Cutting Off the Tumor of Shekau's Kharijites. On 27 February 2018, he was made a 'Specially Designated National' by the United States Office of Foreign Assets Control.

In March 2019, rumours began to circulate according to which Abu Musab had been replaced by Abu Abdullah Idris ibn Umar al-Barnawi as the governor of ISWAP. Neither the Islamic State's top leadership, nor members of its West Africa branch officially commented on the claims, resulting in speculations about the reported dismissal. Some argued that he had possibly been overthrown as part of an internal power struggle, while the Multinational Joint Task Force (MJTF) claimed that he had been fired by the Islamic State's top command due to a number of defeats of his forces at the hands of MJTF. Later research by the International Crisis Group concluded that Abu Musab had stepped down after being challenged by other ISWAP senior commanders who considered him too young for a leader. The Islamic State central command never officially accepted Abu Musab's removal from his position.

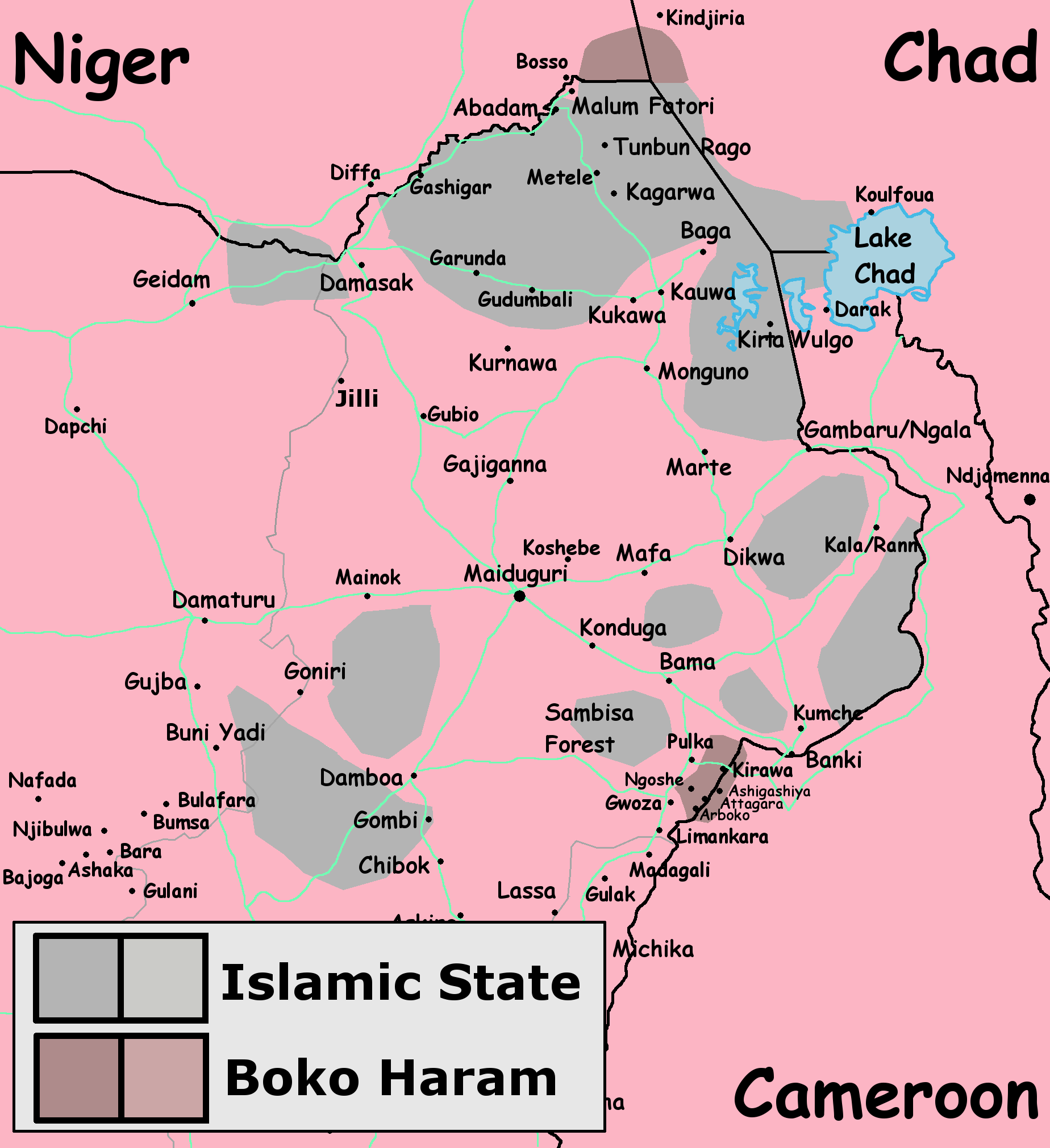
Areas under control of ISWAP and Boko Haram in 2022

Around mid-May 2021, ISWAP released an audio declaring that Abu Musab al-Barnawi had been reinstated by the IS central command as "caretaker" leader of ISWAP. With Abu Musab restored to overall command, ISWAP proceeded to overrun Sambisa Forest, inflicting a major defeat on the Shekau faction and resulting in Abubakar Shekau's death. Al-Barnawi consequently declared Boko Haram dissolved, and Shekau dead, condemning him as "someone who committed unimaginable terrorism". Soon after, ISWAP's structure was reformed, and Abu Musab was appointed head of the ISWAP's shura (a powerful consultative assembly) and commander of Sambisa Forest. According to the Daily Trust newspaper, he was killed in August 2021. Different accounts of his death circulated, alleging that he had either been killed by the Nigerian Army or as a result of inter-ISWAP power struggles. It was confirmed by ISWAP sources that Abu Musab had been wounded in a clash with Boko Haram loyalists around this time, though Islamic State members did not comment on the allegations of his death. Boko Haram loyalists under Bakura Doro reportedly sought to kill Abu Musab for his role in Shekau's demise.

The accuracy of the claim of Abu Musab's death was questioned by Crisis Group and Humangle Media researchers who gathered "multiple sources" suggesting that Abu Musab had disappeared due to being promoted. According to Humangle Media journalist Aliyu Dahiru, one source reported that Abu Musab al-Barnawi was "well and alive" as of 2022. As per these claims, Abu Musab had actually been appointed to IS central's global shura (advisory) council and was involved in coordinating IS operations beyond the Chad Basin. This report was mirrored by interviews by Crisis Group researchers with ISWAP members who stated that Abu Musab had been given a "larger, though unspecified, African mandate" as he was recovering from a wound. In 2023, researcher Jacob Zenn stated that "al-Barnawi [...] maintains a leading role in ISWAP, but is [no longer] the official leader".

=== Possible death ===
In 2026, Humangle Media reported that Abu Musab had died in 2023, based on alleged eyewitness accounts including family members. According to this account, IS had planned to extract him from Nigeria and move him to a safer location in North Africa or the Middle East. For this purpose, he located to a safe house in Kaduna where he was supposed to receive a Niger Republic international passport to leave the country. He was accompanied by one of his wives and their child. Yet local security agents received word of the presence of a militant in Kaduna; though unaware that they had located ISWAP's top commander, the agents found the safe house and approached it. Upon realizing that security forces had found him, Abu Musab was reportedly "calm, almost detached". He told his wife to take their child and open the house's gate. Once she was gone and he was alone, he killed himself with an explosive vest to avoid capture.

The local security forces were ignorant of the identity of the man who had killed himself in Kaduna and thus did not report Abu Musab's death. ISWAP also did not announce his demise, and instead continued to use the kunya Abu Musab al-Barnawi; as a result, other militants assumed his identity and maintained a deception about his survival. Zenn argued that Humangle Media's story "cannot be fully corroborated" but was believable considering existing evidence, including his long absence from public view.

== Private life ==
Knowledge about Abu Musab al-Barnawi's private life is based on family testimonies which vary in content and reliability. According to Humangle Media, he had several wives with Zainab, Halima, and Aisha being commonly named. He also had children, though their names are not consistently reported; according to one version, his children included Mus'ab, Humaira, Rumaisa, Muhammad, whereas other accounts report Muhammad, Shifa'u, Ramla, Zarah, Rufaidah, Kasim, Abdullahi, and Amir. One family testimony also claimed that Abu Musab had an enslaved concubine who had become the mother to one of his daughters.

Within Boko Haram and later ISWAP, Abu Musab held the reputation of an intellectual. He often read religious literature.

== Publications ==
- Cutting Off the Tumor of Shekau's Kharijites. 2016.
- Cutting out the tumour from the Khawarij of Shekau by the allegiance of the people of nobility. 2018.
