= Audu Bulama Bukarti =

International strategic analyst

Barrister Bulama Bukarti
- Born: 1984 (age 41–42); Yobe State
- Education: LLM, LLB, BL
- Alma mater: Bayero University, Kano, Nigerian Law School
- Occupations: Senior Analyst, Public Intellectual and Human Rights Lawyer
- Years active: 2012 to date
- Employer: Tony Blair Institute for Global Change
- Organization: Center for Strategic and International Studies
- Known for: Principle
- Awards: CoWa Award 2017

Bulama Bukarti is a prominent Nigerian lawyer, public intellectual and reform advocate focusing on security, governance, and justice in Africa.

He currently serves as the Vice President of Programs and Disarmament, Demobilisation, and Reintegration (DDR) & Deradicalization at the Bridgeway Foundation.

== Early life and education ==
Bulama was born in Bukarti town of Yobe State, Nigeria, he started his education in Bukarti Primary School, Yobe, he obtained his Nigeria Certificate in Education (NCE) in 2005, from College of Education Gashua, Nigeria. he attended Bayero University, Kano between 2006 and 2011 where he obtained Bachelor of Laws (Common & Islamic Law); at Second Class Upper grade he went to Nigerian Law School where he was trained as Legal Practitioner and he was called to bar in 2012.

In 2016 Bukarti obtained his Master of Laws from Bayero University, Kano and He completed his PhD in Law at the SOAS University of London with a focus on Boko Haram, laws of war and humanitarian law.

== Career ==
Bulama started his career as Assistant Senior Accounts Officer II at Karasuwa Local Government of Yobe State where he worked for ten years that is from 2003 to 2013. From 2014 to 2018, Bukarti taught law at Bayero University, Kano, where he lectured on various subjects, supervised undergraduate research projects, and practised as a legal practitioner with a focus on human rights, employment law, and medical negligence cases.

in 2017 Bulama joined Tony Blair Institute for Global Change as Sub-Saharan Africa Analyst.

He is a regular guest on Hausa- and English-language channels, including Voice of America, BBC, Aljazeera and Deutsche Welle; he has spoken at the University of Oxford and Chatham House; Harvard University, Yale University, George Washington University and many more.

== Research and Advocacy on Boko Haram ==
Bulama was a Senior Analyst in the Extremism Policy Unit of the Tony Blair Institute for Global Change, senior non-resident at the Africa Program of the Center for Strategic and International Studies.

Bulama's research focuses on violent extremist groups in sub-Saharan Africa. He has studied extremist groups in Africa for over a decade and has written many papers, commentaries, and op-eds on extremist groups’ history, ideology, and strategy; deradicalization and reintegration of former fighters; and response to COVID-19, including for Foreign Policy, the Independent, the Telegraph, CNN, the Council on Foreign Relations, Hudson Institute, the National, and War on the Rocks. He has been cited several times each in The Washington Post, The Wall Street Journal, The New York Times, The Guardian, The Telegraph, and Reuters, among others. He has granted interviews various outlets of BBC World Service, Sky News, France 24, Voice of America, Al Jazeera TRT World and a host of others.

Bulama is an opinion columnist at Daily Trust, northern Nigeria's largest newspaper, where he writes every Wednesday.

Bukarti is recognized as a leading expert on critically analyzing the group's strategies and the Nigerian government’s approach to counterinsurgency. He advocates for comprehensive strategies incorporating deradicalization and community rebuilding.

Due to his outspoken criticism, Bukarti has been targeted with death threats from Boko Haram's leadership, including a public video threat from a Boko Haram member, and threats from the bandit kingpin Bello Turji.

== Publications ==
1. The most worrying aspect of the Kankara kidnapping, African Arguments, (February 2021)
2. The West in African Violent Extremists’ Discourse, Hudson Institute (October 2020)
3. The Mozambique Conflict and Deteriorating Security Situation, Tony Blair Institute for Global Change (June 2020)
4. A deadly alliance: coronavirus makes Boko Haram more dangerous than ever The Telegraph(June 2020)
5. Thanks to coronavirus, Boko Haram is making a comeback, The Independent (April 2020)
6. How Jihadi Groups in Africa Will Exploit COVID-19, Council on Foreign Relations (April 2020)
7. The Challenge of Boko Haram Defectors in Chad, War on the Rocks (March 2020)
8. The Origins of Boko Haram—And Why It Matters, Hudson Institute (January 2020)

== Personal life ==
Bukarti resides in London, United Kingdom. He is married with children and is currently writing a memoir titled Into the Well.
