= Al-Naba =

Weekly newspaper

- Al-Naba (No.49, 2 Muharram 1437)
- Frequency: Weekly
- Founder: Islamic State
- Founded: 2014
- First issue: October 16, 2015; 11 years ago
- Language: Arabic

Al-Naba (Arabic: النبأ lit. The News or The Report) is an official weekly newspaper issued by the Central Media Office of the Islamic State, first published in 2014.

The first issue of the newspaper was published in May-June 2010, and on 17 October 2015 it started its activity as an official weekly newsletter. As of February 20, 2025, it published 483 issues.

With the defeat of IS in both Syria and Iraq, the newspaper temporarily stopped being published, but eventually started publishing its news based on the Islamic State inside the African regime.

== See also ==
- Dabiq magazine
- Amaq News Agency
