= Abubakar Shekau =

Nigerian militant and leader of Boko Haram (1973–2021)

- Shekau announcing Boko Haram's abduction of 276 Nigerian schoolgirls in a May 2014 video
- Born: Abubakar Mohammed Shekau; 23 March 1973; Shekau, Tarmuwa, Yobe State, Nigeria
- Died: 19 May 2021 (aged 48); Sambisa Forest, Borno State, Nigeria
- Cause of death: Suicide bombing
- Children: Ibn Mohammed Shekau; Fatima Shekau
- Military career
- Allegiance: Boko Haram (2002–2021); Islamic State (fully 2015–2016; loosely from 2016)
- Service years: 2002–2021
- Rank: Leader (2009–2021)
- Conflicts: Boko Haram insurgency: 2009 Boko Haram uprising; January 2015 raid on Kolofata; 2015 West African offensive; 2015 Niger raid; Chad Basin campaign (2018–2020); Boko Haram–ISWAP conflict; Battle of Sambisa Forest (2021) ‡‡

Pronunciation of Abubakar Shekau

Abubakar Mohammed Shekau (23 March 1973 – 19 May 2021) was a Nigerian militant who was the leader of Boko Haram, an extremist organization based in northeastern Nigeria, from 2009 until his suicide in 2021 during the Battle of Sambisa Forest. He previously served as deputy leader to the group's founder, Mohammed Yusuf, until Yusuf's execution by Nigerian police in 2009.

Nigerian authorities believed that Shekau was killed in 2009 during clashes between security forces and Boko Haram until July 2010, when Shekau appeared in a video claiming leadership of the group. He had subsequently been regularly reported dead and was thought to use doubles.

Shekau was criticized by human rights advocates for terrorism, bombings, forced conversions and kidnapping.

In March 2015 Shekau pledged allegiance to ISIL leader Abu Bakr al-Baghdadi. However, in 2016, ISIS Central tried to replace Shekau with Abu Musab al-Barnawi as leader of the group, causing a split. Shekau's loyalists were called Boko Haram and al-Barnawi's loyalists were known as Islamic State's West Africa Province. Relations between Shekau and ISIS declined, and in 2021 ISIS launched a major operation against Shekau and his supporters.

Shekau killed himself on 19 May 2021 by detonating a suicide vest during the battle of Sambisa Forest between Boko Haram and Islamic State's West Africa Province. His death was first reported by The Wall Street Journal and was confirmed by Nigerian officials, ISWAP, and his surviving loyalists.

== Biography ==
=== Early years ===
Abubakar Mohammed Shekau was born on 23 March 1973 in the Nigerian village of Shekau in the Tarmuwa local government of Yobe State. His father was Mohammed Shekau, a local district imam, and his mother was Falmata Abubakar. According to Falmata, Abubakar left for Maiduguri during his boyhood and became an almajiri. Almajirai often beg on the street for food, and it is believed Shekau did the same. He reportedly received formal Islamic education in a local religious school known as a tsangaya from a cleric named Baba Fani.

Shekau was an ethnic Kanuri, and also spoke Hausa, Fulani, Arabic and English. In 1991, he moved to Mafoni Ward in Maiduguri and enrolled in the Borno College of Legal and Islamic Studies (BOCOLIS), where he graduated in 2004. Shekau reportedly had a photographic memory, and devoted much of his time in BOCOLIS to developing his self-taught interpretation of Islam.

He later met Mohammed Yusuf, the founder of Jamaat Ahlus Sunnah li Dawah wal Jihad, and became one of his deputies. Shekau was appointed the leader of the group in July 2009, after the death of Yusuf in the 2009 Boko Haram uprising. Shekau survived being shot in the leg during the 2009 attempt on his life by Nigerian security forces. He was married to one of Muhammad Yusuf's four widows. His nickname was "Darul Tawheed", which translates as "specialist in tawheed", the Islamic concept of oneness of Allah.

=== Leader of Boko Haram ===
Shekau's leadership did not go unchallenged. He received a letter from al-Qaeda in the Islamic Maghreb giving him advice but he did not need it. As a result of his erratic leadership, in 2012 a faction of the group broke off to form Jamaat Ansar al-Muslimin fi Bilād as-Sudn (Ansaru). This faction included his military commander Abu Muhammad al-Bauchawi, and religious advisor Sheikh Abu Osama al-Ansari Muhammad Awal al-Gombawi. Despite this, many soldiers and commanders stayed with Shekau, including military commanders Abu Sa'ad al-Bamawi and Muhammad Salafi. With his group mostly intact, Shekau engaged in conflict with Ansaru, killing their leader Abu Osama al-Ansari. As a result of this, and other arrests of Ansaru leaders by the Nigerian government, Ansaru did not pose a further threat to Shekau's leadership of the jihadi movement in Nigeria, and the group became defunct by 2015.

Shekau's fellow jihadist fighters were undisciplined and abused the populations they encountered, resulting in the establishment of civilian militias such as the Civilian Joint Task Force to fight them. Shekau was also thought to have killed his own religious advisors, including Sheikh Abd al-Malek al-Ansari al-Kadunawi and Abu al-Abbas al-Bankiwani.

In June 2012, the United States Department of State designated Shekau as a terrorist and effectively froze his assets in the United States. Since June 2013, the department has had a standing reward of US$7 million for information leading to Shekau's capture through its Rewards for Justice program. In addition, the Nigerian army has offered a ₦50 million reward (approximately US$300,000) for Shekau.

In videos Shekau posted online, he boasted often about his invincibility; mocked various armies; and stated that he "cannot be stopped" and "cannot die except by the will of Allah". He has also boasted of being in possession of armoured tanks and other combat vehicles. His online videos frequently depict anti-American rhetoric, and he has made multiple threats to attack the U.S.

In one prominent incident, he took credit for the kidnapping of over 200 school girls in April 2014. Shekau also announced that the kidnapped girls have been converted to Islam. He has claimed to be waging a jihad against Christianity.

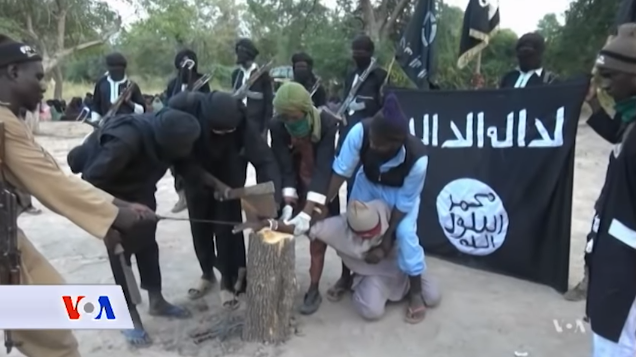
Amputation led by Boko Haram.

In a May 2014 video, he asserted that his goal was to create a caliphate.

With the rise of the Islamic State in Iraq and Syria during 2014 and 2015, Shekau faced pressure from his commanders and soldiers to pledge his allegiance to IS leader Abu Bakr al-Baghdadi. A history of the group says that Shekau "was compelled to give allegiance, and that was through a coming together of the military commanders, and after he became convinced that the matter was about to go out of his hand, and that his throne would be shaken and emptied of him if he did not give allegiance".

After Gwoza massacre took place, he declared Gwoza to be under the control of Boko Haram, saying "Thanks be to Allah who has given us victory in Gwoza and made us part of the Islamic caliphate. Thanks be to Allah. We are in an Islamic caliphate and we have nothing to do with Nigeria."

Shekau threatened to attack participants in the 2015 Nigerian general election.

In August 2016, ISIL appointed Abu Musab al-Barnawi as the leader of the group in place of Shekau. Shekau refused to recognise Barnawi's authority and split off part of the group under its original name of Jamaat Ahlus Sunnah li Dawah wal Jihad, while Barnawi led the "Islamic State's West Africa Province" (ISWAP). While Shekau led his group, he only had 1,500 soldiers, whereas Barnawi had 3,500. Shekau has been widely denounced as following the ideology of the Khawarij by the Islamic State and West Africa province in Nigeria.

Following the split, many clashes occurred between Shekau and Barnawi's forces over the next years. Regardless, Shekau never fully renounced his allegiance to the Islamic State, instead framing the rebel infighting as being solely attributable to his local rivals.

== Reports of death ==
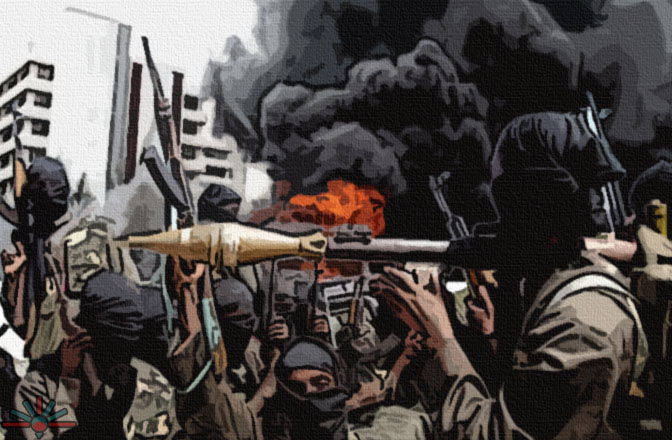
Artistic depiction of a Boko Haram attack in Borno State, Nigeria

Shekau was reported killed in 2009 but reappeared as the group leader less than a year later. The Nigerian army in mid-August 2013 stated that he was fatally wounded when soldiers raided a base of Boko Haram in Sambisa forest and had died between 25 July and 3 August. However, a video in September 2013 was released in which a man purported to be Shekau claimed he had not been killed. The Nigerian army also stated to have killed him during the 2014 Battle of Konduga that lasted from 12 to 14 September. The Cameroonian military posted a photo and also claimed that their forces killed Shekau in September 2014. In response to these reports, security analyst Ryan Cummings commented, "Is this his fourth or fifth death? He dies more often than an iPhone battery." In early October 2014, a video was obtained by AFP news agency that showed Shekau alive, in which he mocked the Nigerian military's allegations that he had been killed.

Chadian President Idriss Déby claimed in mid-August 2015 that Shekau had been replaced by Mahamat Daoud without exactly specifying his fate. An audio message attributed to Shekau was released a few days later, in which he purportedly stated that he had neither been killed nor ousted as chief of the group.

Shekau was reported to have been "fatally wounded" during an airstrike in Taye village on 19 August 2016 by Nigerian Air Force which also killed some senior leaders of Boko Haram. On 25 September, a video of a man purported to be Shekau was released on YouTube, in which he claimed that he was alive and in good health.

On 27 June 2017, Shekau released a video in which he claimed responsibility for the abduction of Nigerian policewomen and criticized the Nigerian government for claiming that Boko Haram had been defeated. This video would seem to be further evidence of Shekau's continued survival. In February 2020, Shekau released a video threatening the minister of information and digital economy, Isa Ali Pantami, and making reference to what was done to Islamic scholar Ja'afar Mahmud Adam in Maiduguri when he preached against Boko Haram, Bulama Bukarti, explained why Boko Haram leader Shekau threatened the Minister in an interview with the BBC.

== Death ==
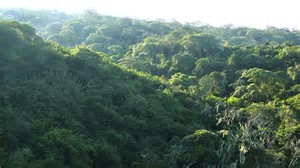
Picture of Sambisa Forest.

In May 2021, fighting between ISWAP and Shekau's troops escalated. The former invaded Sambisa Forest, Boko Haram's traditional stronghold, and encircled Shekau on 19 May. ISWAP attempted to convince Shekau to surrender and acknowledge Barnawi's authority, but the Boko Haram leader refused. In the middle of the negotiations, Shekau reportedly used a suicide vest to kill himself as well as a senior ISWAP frontline commander who was talking to him at the time. ISWAP was surprised by this "dramatic" action.

Over the next weeks, several sources gradually issued confirmations of his death. ISWAP declared Shekau dead in early June 2021, with al-Barnawi condemning him as "someone who committed unimaginable terrorism". In mid-June 2021, Shekau's loyalists under Bakura Sahalaba confirmed his death, but also declared that they would continue to fight against ISWAP. Initially, the leadership of the Boko Haram remnants remained disputed, as several sub-commanders like Bakura Doro and Bakura Sahalaba took charge. In May 2022, Boko Haram announced Abu Umaimata as its new leader.

== Personal life ==
Shekau had several children, including a daughter named Fatima, and a son who is known by Ibn Mohammed bin Shekau. Nigerian lawmaker Ahmed Satomi estimated that Shekau had four wives, including the ex-wife of Mohammed Yusuf, and 89 children, some of whom were from kidnapped women and adopted from Yusuf after his death.

== See also ==
- Sharia in Nigeria
- Slavery in 21st-century Islamism
