= Sambisa Forest =

Forest in Borno State

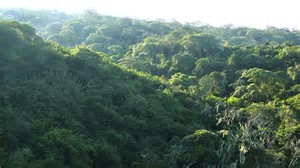

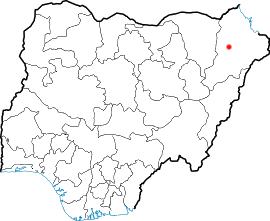
- Location of Sambisa Forest in Borno State

Geography
- Location: Sambisa, Borno, Nigeria
- Coordinates: 11°15′00″N 13°25′00″E
- Elevation: 359 metres (1,178 ft)
- Area: 518 km^{2} (200 mi^{2})

Administration
- Authority: Islamic State; West Africa Province (Since May 2021)

Ecology
- Forest cover: Western Sudanese savannah

The Sambisa Forest is a forest in Borno State, northeast Nigeria. It is in the southwestern part of Chad Basin National Park, about 60 km southeast of Maiduguri, the capital of Borno State. It has an area of 518 km^{2}.

== Geography ==
The Sambisa Forest is located at the northeastern tip of the west Sudanian savanna and the southern boundary of the Sahel savanna about 60 km southeast of Maiduguri, Borno State. It occupies parts of the states of Borno, Adamawa, Yobe, Gombe, Bauchi along the corridor Darazo, Jigawa, and some parts of Kano State farther north. It is administered by Askira/Uba in the south, Damboa in the southwest, and Konduga and Jere in the west.

The name of the forest comes from the village of Sambisa, which is on the border with Gwoza in the east. The Gwoza hills in the east have peaks of 1,300 meters above sea level and form part of the Mandara Mountains range along the Cameroon–Nigeria border. The forest is drained by seasonal streams into the Yedseram and the Ngadda Rivers.

== Climate ==
The climate is hot and semi-arid, with minimum temperatures of about 21.5 °C between December and February, a maximum of about 48 °C in May and average temperatures of about 28–29 °C. The dry season is from November to May, and the wet season is between May and September/October, with annual rainfall of about 190 mm.

== Flora ==
The Sambisa Forest is one of the few forests in northeastern Nigeria where sparse vegetation is the norm. Most of the vegetation is typical of the Sudanian savanna, although, because of human activity, some parts have become more like the Sahel savanna. The forest consists of a mixture of open woodland and sections of very dense vegetation of short trees about two metres high and thorny bushes, with a height of 1/2-1 metres, which are difficult to penetrate. Major trees and bushes in the forest include tallow, rubber, wild black plum, birch, date palm, mesquite, acacia, monkey bread, red bushwillow, baobab, jackalberry, tamarind and terminalia.

== Fauna ==
BirdLife International reports that 62 species of birds have been recorded in the Sambisa Game Reserve, including the guinea fowl, francolin, village weaver, Abyssinian ground hornbill, Arabian bustard, Savile's bustard, African collared-dove, chestnut-bellied starling, black scrub-robin and Sudan golden sparrow. The forest was also thought to be the last remaining site of the ostrich in Nigeria.

Seventeen species of mammals were reported in 2010 in the Sambisa Game Reserve, including the baboon, patas monkey, tantalus monkey, Grimm's duiker, red-fronted gazelle, African bush elephant, roan antelope, hartebeest, African leopard and spotted hyenas. However, poaching, chopping downing trees for fuel, human agricultural penetration and the Boko Haram jihadist group's activities since 2013 have reduced their numbers. An aerial survey of the game reserve in 2006 reported seeing only five large wild animal species.

== Sambisa Game Reserve ==
During the colonial period, the Sambisa Game Reserve covered an area of 2,258 km^{2} (872 mi^{2}) in the eastern part of the forest. Later reports put the size of the game reserve at 518 square kilometres (200 mi^{2}), although some official documents included the Marguba Forest Reserve in the Sambisa Game Reserve.

From 1970, the reserve was used for safaris. It had a large population of leopards, lions, elephants, hyenas, that tourists could observe from cabins or safari lodges. In 1991, the government of Borno incorporated this reserve into the national park of the Chad Basin. However, the abandonment of its management following the Sambisa takeover by Boko Haram insurgents in February 2013 led to the gradual disappearance of animals. Lodges collapsed or were destroyed, vegetation invaded roads, and rivers dried up.

== Boko Haram conflict ==
The Sambisa forest, especially the mountainous region of Gwoza near the Cameroon border, is used as shelter by Boko Haram and is believed to be where they kept the hostages from the Chibok schoolgirls kidnapping in April 2014.

During spring 2015, the Nigerian Army started an offensive against Boko Haram in the forest but was slowed down due to finding the forest to be heavily mined and the militants having better local knowledge. Despite this on 28 April, four Boko Haram camps in the Sambisa Forest were overrun by the Nigerian military, who freed nearly 300 girls and women, who were not, however, the missing Chibok girls. On 30 April, another 13 Boko Haram camps were destroyed, and 234 more women and children were reportedly freed near Kawuri and Konduga.

On 4 November the Nigerian Army said that troops of 5 Brigade Task Group killed two Boko Haram suspects, after destroying their camps at Hausari and Baranga in Marte. According to an official statement by the military, "In efforts to continually dominate recovered territories and clear all Nigerian territory of Boko Haram vestiges, the advancing troops of 5 Brigade Task Group have today cleared five more terrorists camps at Hausari and Baranga in Marte Local Government Area of Borno State."

On 18 May 2016, one of the schoolgirls abducted from Chibok in 2014 was reportedly found by local militia men fighting Boko Haram in the Sambisa Forest. It was also reported that 218 of the girls were still missing, and that the found girl claimed that except six said to have died, all of them were still being held captive in the forest.

Between 19 and 20 May 2021, the forest was captured by IS-West Africa Province (ISWAP) after fierce fighting between ISWAP and Boko Haram. In March 2022, the Nigerian military uncovered the wreckage of an Alpha Jet, a year after it crashed in Sambisa.
