= Ekiti prison break =

2014 prison break in Nigerian prison

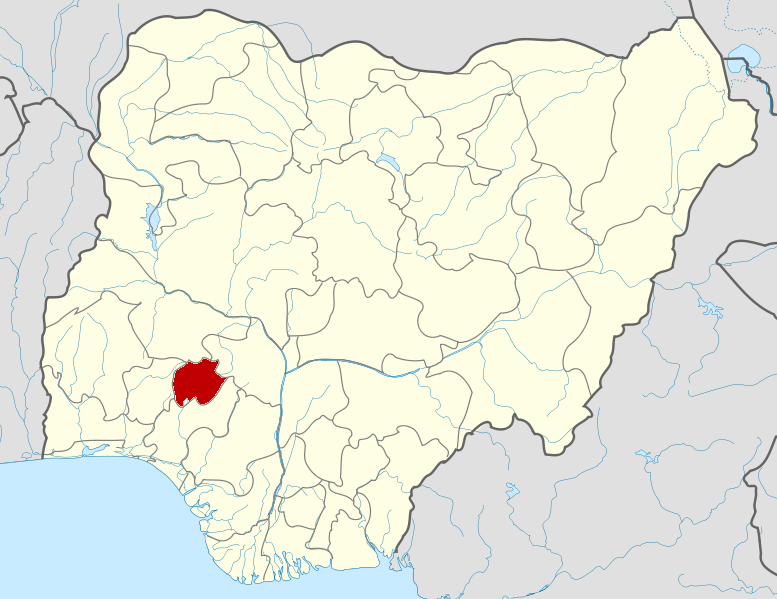
- Location: Ekiti State, southwestern Nigeria
- Date: 30 November 2014
- Target: Ekiti federal prison
- Attack type: Prison break
- Deaths: 1
- Injuries: 0
- Perpetrator: Unknown gunmen
- No. of participants: 60
- Defender: 341 prisoners escaped

The Ekiti prison break was an attack on the federal prison at Afao road, Ado Ekiti in the southwestern Nigerian city of Ekiti State by 60 unknown gunmen. The attack occurred on 30 November 2014. 341 prisoners escaped from the prison leaving 1 warder and 20 sniffer dogs dead. The escaped prisoners were largely awaiting trial. 10 inmates who attempted to escape were captured during the attack at gunfire exchange between the policemen and the gunmen. 67 inmates were rearrested after the attack and 274 inmates escaped. One inmate, who claimed to have run away when he heard gunshots, returned to the prison to serve out his short sentence.

== Incident ==
The incident was reported to have occurred on Sunday, 30 November 2014. Kehinde Fadipe, the comptroller general of the Nigerian Prisons Services, refuted the claims that the unknown gunmen were members of the Boko Haram, an Islamic sect in Northeastern Nigeria, on the basis of the fact that none of their members was awaiting trial in that prison. On 1 December 2014, Ekiti State executive governor Ayodele Fayose accused prison officials of conspiring with the unknown gunmen to launch the attack.

== Reactions ==
Initially the attack was linked with the Oduduwa People's Congress, alleged to be an attempt to unlawfully release Adeniyi Adedipe, the coordinator of the Oodua Peoples Congress in Ekiti State Chapter, who had been awaiting a trial. Adedipe was convicted of the murder of a former state chairman of the National Union of Road Transport Workers, Chief Omolafe Aderiye. This generated a lot of reactions and controversies across the state, especially between the Peoples's Democratic Party, PDP and the opposition party, the All Progressive Congress, APC, but the claim that OPC was responsible for the attack was annulled because Fadipe never escaped as earlier alleged. The jail break was attributed to the poor funding of the Nigerian Prisons Services by the federal government of Nigeria, inadequate prison personnel and poor prison facilities.

== See also ==
- Bauchi prison break
- Minna prison break
- Kogi prison break
