= Ondo prison break =

2013 prison break in Nigerian prison

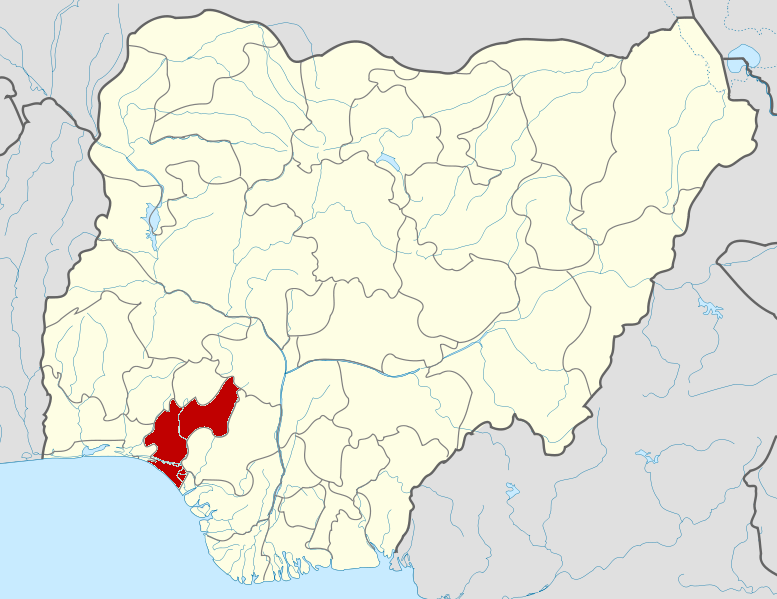
- Location: Ondo State, Southwestern Nigeria
- Date: 30 June 2013
- Target: Olokuta Medium Security Prison
- Attack type: Prison escape
- Deaths: 2
- Injuries: 1
- Perpetrator: Armed robbers
- No. of participants: 175
- Defender: 54

The Ondo prison break was an attack on the Olokuta Medium Security Prison in Akure, the capital of Ondo State, Nigeria, by 50 unknown gunmen suspected to be armed robbers. The attack occurred on 30 June 2013. About 175 prisoners escaped from the prison leaving 2 people dead and 1 warder injured. The escaped prisoners were largely awaiting trial for robbery. About 54 escaped inmates were rearrested after the attack and about 121 inmates escaped.

== Incident ==
The incident was reported to have occurred on Sunday, 30 June 2013. Tunde Olayiwola, the comptroller general of the Nigerian Prisons Services in Ondo state, who confirmed the attack dispelled the claims that the unknown gunmen were members of the Boko Haram, a terrorist group in the northeastern Nigeria. The incident was linked with gangs of robbers arrested during a bank robbery in Akure, who had been kept in the prison for over one year without trial.

== See also ==
- Lagos prison break
