= Monguno attack =

Monguno attack may refer to:

- June 2015 Monguno bombing
- September 2015 Borno State bombings
- 2020 Monguno and Nganzai massacres
