= Lagos prison break =

2014 prison escape in Nigeria

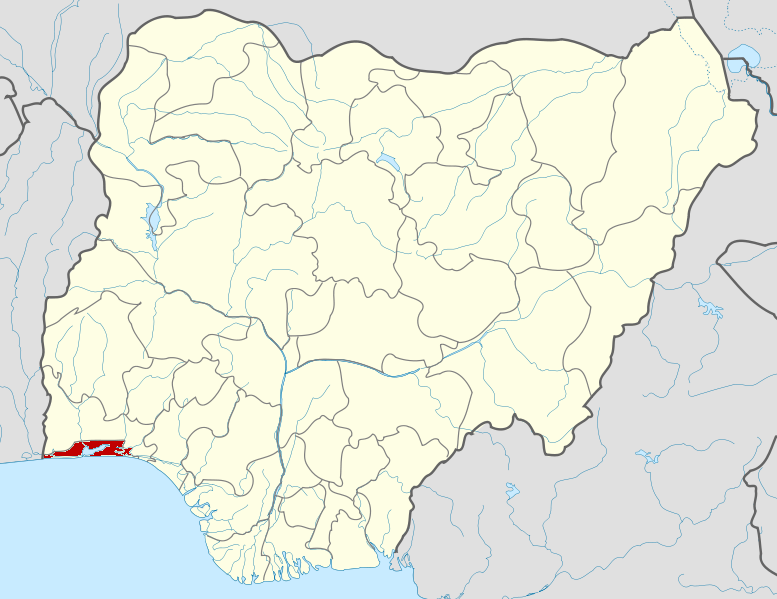
- Location: Lagos State, Southwestern Nigeria
- Date: 10 October 2014
- Target: Kirirkiri Medium Prison
- Attack type: Prison escape
- Deaths: 2
- Injuries: 32
- Perpetrator: Convicted inmates
- No. of participants: Unknown
- Defender: 5 prisoners escaped

The Lagos Prison Break occurred on October 10, 2014, when five persons (Ayodeji Bello, 32, Saibu Abdul Razak, 21, Adebayo Dada, 24, Desmond Issac 35 and Peter Kingsley, 29) escaped from the Kirikiri Medium Prison.

== Incident ==
The incident was reported to have occurred on 10 October 2014 at around 4 pm. The prison break was unsuccessful as a result of a collaborative effort of the Kirikiri divisional police officers and the officers of the Nigerian Prisons Services on duty, who prevented the prison break. The incident was linked with a minor riot that occurred within the prison, a riot whose causes were unclear.

== See also ==
- Kogi prison break
- Ondo prison break
- Ogun prison break
