= General Hospital Monguno =

Coordinates: 12.6843°N 13.6059°E

Monguno Specialist Hospital

Geography
- Location: Monguno, North, Borno State, Nigeria

History
- Former name: General Hospital Monguno
- Opened: January 1, 1983

Links
- Lists: Hospitals in Nigeria

The General Hospital Monguno is a public hospital, located in Monguno, Monguno Local Government Area, Borno State, Nigeria. It was established in 1983, and operates on 24hours basis.

== Description ==
The General Hospital Monguno was licensed by the Federal Ministry of Health with facility code 08/24/1/2/1/0001 and registered as Secondary Health Care Centre.
