= Bauchi prison break =

Prison break perpetrated by Boko Haram

Coordinates: 10.3158°N 9.8442°E

- Part of the Boko Haram insurgency
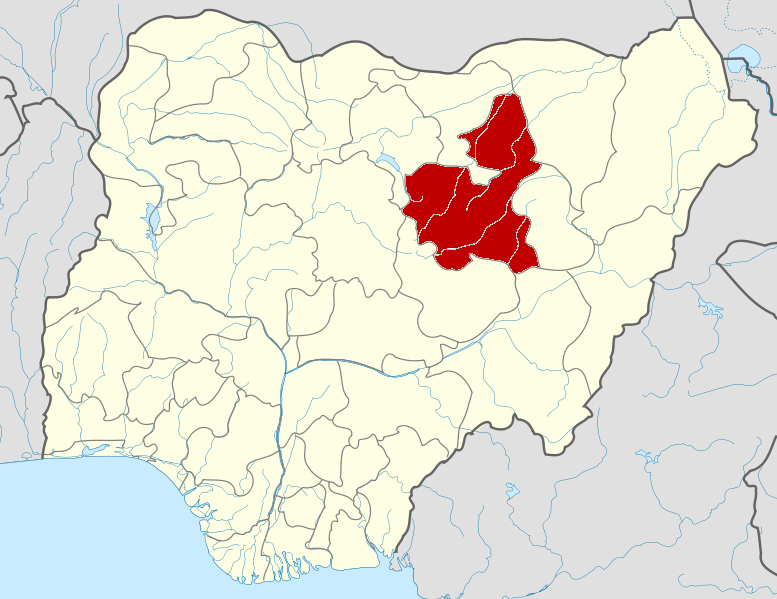
- Location: Bauchi State, northern Nigeria
- Date: 7 September 2010
- Target: Bauchi prison
- Attack type: Prison break
- Deaths: 5
- Injuries: 6
- Perpetrator: Boko Haram
- No. of participants: 50
- Defender: 721 prisoners escaped

The Bauchi Prison break was an attack on the federal prison in Bauchi, Nigeria, in which members of Boko Haram released 721 prisoners. The attack occurred on 7 September 2010, and was carried out by approximately 50 gunmen. Of the prisoners who escaped, as many as 150 were affiliated with the terrorist group Boko Haram. The prison break was part of a broader escalation of Boko Haram activity, that escalation served as retaliation for the death of one of the group's primary leaders. Following this, Boko Haram staged multiple subsequent attacks on government and religious targets in Bauchi State.

== Background ==
Nigeria is largely split between the Christian south and Muslim north, and tensions have built between the two groups. There has been Religious violence in Nigeria since 1953. The prisoners in Bauchi were largely awaiting trial for the 2009 Boko Haram uprising.

Members of Boko Haram had staged an attack on a police station in Bauchi State on 26 July 2009, in which 150 people were killed. This was followed by a spurt of coordinated attacks across multiple states, including in neighboring Borno State. During an aggressive government response, Boko Haram's leader Mohammed Yusuf was arrested on 30 July. He was killed in an extrajudicial killing by the police after interrogation, although some sources claim that he was killed while being taken into custody.

Officials both believed and announced that Yusuf's death would lead to the group's collapse. It instead resulted in increased recruitment and expansion, and escalation of the group's activities. The death of Yusuf while in custody has been characterized as one of the group's primary grievances against the Nigerian government. Yusuf's second-in-command, Abubakar Shekau, subsequently threatened retaliation against the government for the deaths of Boko Haram members.

== Incident ==
Boko Haram timed the prison break for a Ramadan evening when the Muslim prison guards would be away and praying at the mosque in preparation for breaking their fast. They came with weapons including AK-47s, cutlasses, and knives, which they used to overpower the reduced prison staff. Parts of the jail were set on fire, killing five people and hospitalizing six, including at least one police officer and bystanders.

721 of the prison's 759 inmates were freed in an attempt to release the 173 Boko Haram members awaiting trial. 127 of the prisoners returned to the prison of their own free will to serve out their short sentences, and 35 prisoners were re-arrested.

Boko Haram used the attack as an opportunity to distribute recruitment and propaganda materials. They left leaflets around the prison detailing their background and manifesto and urging readers to take up arms for their cause.

== Aftermath ==
State Governor Isa Yuguda announced on 8 September 2010 that members of Boko Haram should leave the state or will be flushed out forcefully. The government's response to Boko Haram activity relied heavily on military and police resources. The city temporarily added military checkpoints on major roads. According to the state police commissioner, Danlami Yar'Adua, 11 suspected members of Boko Haram were arrested during this campaign. The Nigerian government also pledged to tighten security at other prisons, especially those thought to be vulnerable to attack. Minister for the Interior Emmanuel Iheanacho stated the "[Nigerian people's] safety and security remains paramount to us."

Boko Haram launched attacks on a police station and army barracks in Bauchi. In 2012, the group carried out a suicide bombing at a church in Bauchi. The prison break in Bauchi is not the only such attack coordinated by Boko Haram. The 2014 Kogi Prison break, which released 119 inmates, was attributed to the group as well. Boko Haram later escalated its presence in the Lake Chad Basin, which countries in the region including Nigeria and Chad have addressed with the Multinational Joint Force.

== See also ==
- Ekiti prison break
- Kogi prison break
- Boko Haram insurgency
- Edo prison break
