= Agodi prison break =

2007 prison escape in Nigeria

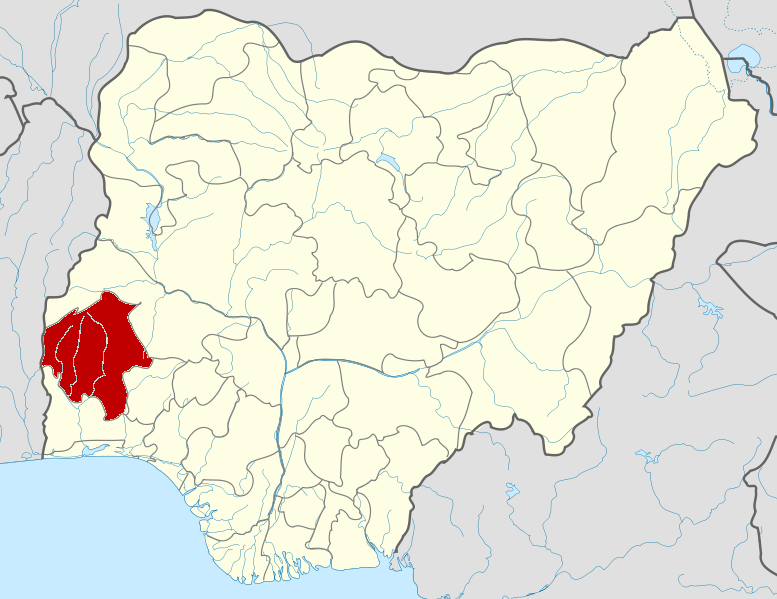
- Location: Oyo State, Southwestern Nigeria
- Date: 11 September 2007
- Target: Agodi Minimum Security Prison
- Attack type: Prison escape
- Deaths: 8
- Injuries: 18
- Perpetrator: prisoners
- Defender: 0

The Agodi prison break was an attack on the Agodi Minimum Security Prison in Ibadan, the capital of Oyo State, Nigeria by condemned criminals. It was reported that about eight inmates died in the attempt leaving eighteen others injured.

== Incident ==
The incident was reported to have occurred on 11 September 2007. The event was masterminded by certain groups of condemned criminals and awaiting trial prisoners who attempted to escape from the prison. The scenario began when the prison warden on duty wanted to serve the prisoners breakfast. Immediately the door was opened they rushed out of the cell with force, beating up the officer with an attempt to release other prisoners from their cells. Police arrived at the scene to curtail the incipient prison break and this resulted in a clash between the inmates and the police. This resulted in the death of eight prisoners and injury of eighteen others. The prison break was unsuccessful as no prisoner was able to escape from the prison.

Mauren Omeli, the Oyo state prison controller general who confirm the attack claimed that the aggrieved prisoners attempted to escape over the fear of inadequate medical care.

== See also ==
- List of prison breaks in Nigeria
