= Kogi prison break =

2014 prison break in Nigerian prison

- Part of the Boko Haram insurgency
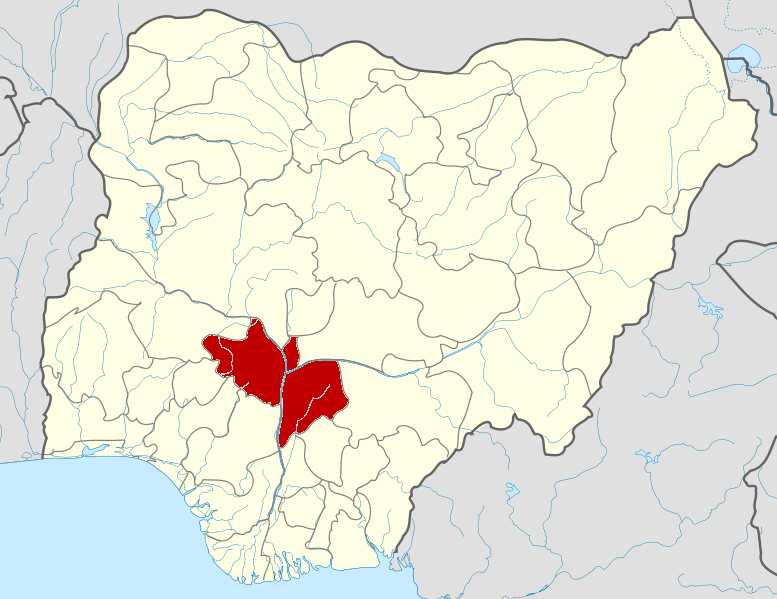
- Location: Kogi State, North-central Nigeria
- Date: 2 November 2014
- Attack type: Prison break
- Deaths: 1
- Injuries: 0
- Perpetrator: Boko Haram
- No. of participants: Unknown
- Defender: 144 prisoners escaped

The Kogi prison break was an attack on Koto-Karffi Federal Medium Security Prisons in Kogi State, in north-central Nigeria by unknown gunmen suspected to be members of the terrorist group, Boko Haram. The attack occurred on 2 November 2014. About 144 prisoners escaped from the prison; 1 inmate was shot and killed during the attack. The escaped prisoners were largely awaiting trial for robbery. Twelve inmates returned to the prison to serve out their sentences and about 45 escaped prisoners were recaptured altogether.

== Incident ==
The incident was reported to have occurred on Sunday, 2 November 2014. The attack was linked with Boko Haram, the Islamic insurgent group operating in northeastern Nigeria. Alhaji Aminu Sule, the comptroller-general of the Nigerian Prisons Services, claimed that the prison break operation was successful as a result of poor funding of the prisons services and that the prison cells had remained unchanged since the prison's establishment in 1934.

== See also ==
- Minna prison break
- Lagos prison break
