= Minna prison break =

2014 prison break in Nigerian prison

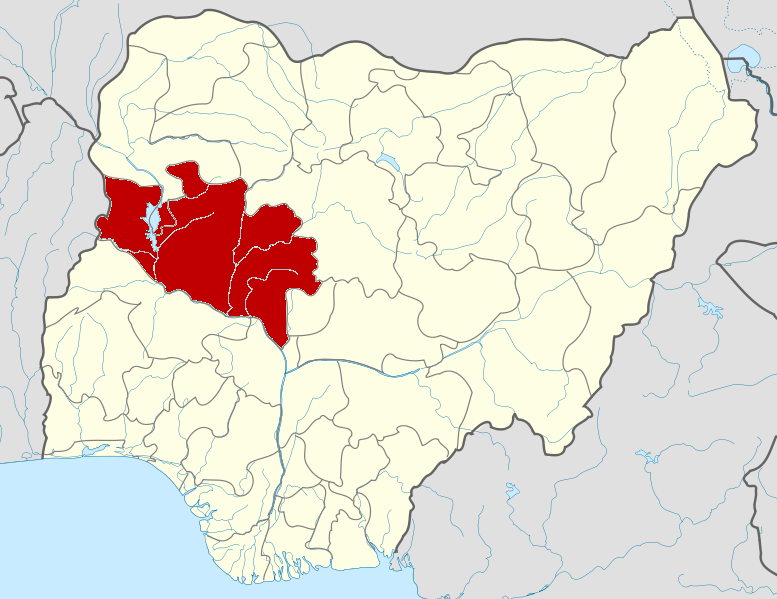
- Location: Niger State, Northwestern Nigeria
- Date: 6 December 2014
- Target: Minna medium prison
- Attack type: Prison escape
- Deaths: 0
- Injuries: 1
- Perpetrator: Armed robbers
- No. of participants: 3
- Defender: 270 prisoners escaped

The Minna prison break was an attack on Minna medium prison, Minna in the northwestern Nigerian city of Niger State by three unknown gunmen suspected to be armed robbers. The attack occurred on 6 December 2014. 270 prisoners escaped from the prison leaving a security officer injured. The escaped prisoners were largely gangs of armed robbers, awaiting trial. It was reported that one of the notorious armed robbers in the prison called Osama took part in the jail break.

== Incident ==
The incident was reported to have occurred on Saturday, 6 December 2014, about a week after the Ekiti prison break. The unknown gunmen, suspected to be armed robbers freed 270 inmates and also looted weapons and bullet-proof vest of the Nigerian Prisons Services. About 108 of the escaped prisoners was rearrested by the Nigerian Prisons Services in conjunction with Nigerian police after the attack. This incident resulted in the removal and suspension of the Niger State prison controller, Musa Maiyaki and the Officer-in-Charge of Medium Security Prison Minna, Mohammed Buena and all officers on duty on the day of the jail break by the federal government of Nigeria through the minister of interior Abba Moro following a recommendation by the controller general of the Nigerian Prisons Services, Dr Peter Ekpendu.

== See also ==
- Ekiti prison break
