= Edo prison break =

2012 prison escape in Nigeria

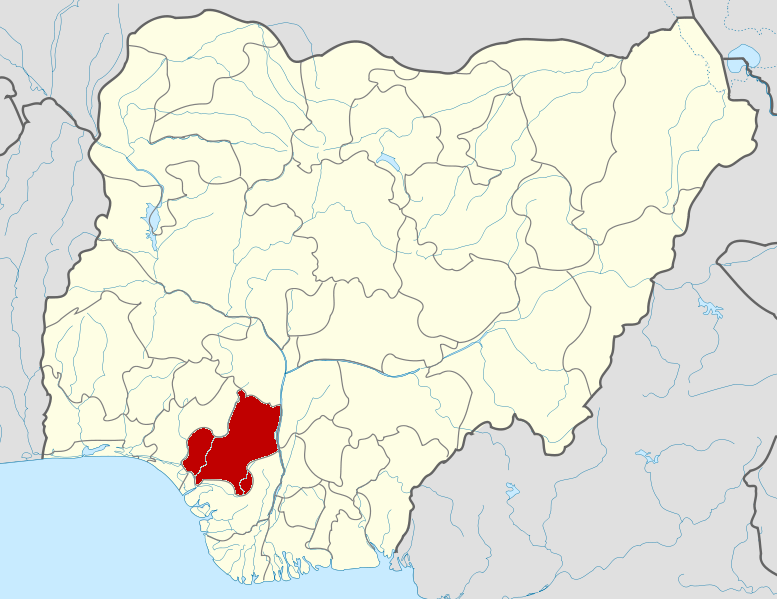
- Location: Edo State, Southern Nigeria
- Date: 19 August 2012
- Target: federal prison
- Attack type: Prison escape
- Deaths: 0
- Injuries: 0
- Perpetrator: prisoners
- Defender: 0

The Edo prison break was an attack on the federal prison at Oko in Benin City, the capital of Edo State in southern Nigeria by unknown gunmen suspected to be Armed robbers in a bid to rescue their members who are largely condemn inmates. About 12 prisoners escaped from the prison.

== Incident ==
The incident occurred on Sunday 19 August 2012. It was reported that an explosive was used in the attack by the criminals to blow open the prison gate, a claim refuted by the Edo state commissioner of police, Olayinka Balogun. No death or severe injuries were recorded from the attack.

== See also ==
- List of prison breaks in Nigeria
