= Abu Qaqa =

Boko Haram spokesman

Abu Qaqa or Abu Kaka is an assumed name of the official spokesperson for the Nigerian terrorist group Boko Haram. Described as the chief information officer and a key leader in the militant group, Qaqa was known for speaking to reporters explaining the motives of the group and taking credit for attacks. At various times the Nigerian government has claimed his capture or death, but this has been denied by Boko Haram.

A man claiming to be Abu Qaqa was detained by the Nigerian government in late January or early February 2012, but confirming his real identity proved to be a challenge since Abu Qaqa is an assumed name. Some reports call the detention a defection. After the arrest, another man introduced himself to reporters as the "real" Abu Qaqa, but the press now calls Abu Qaqa II. At least one additional Abu Qaqa's later emerged, sometimes referred to as Abu Qaqa III.

Notably, speaking by phone to reporters in November 2012, one of the new Abu Qaqas said "We are together with al Qaeda, they are promoting the cause of Islam, just as we are doing. Therefore they help us in our struggle and we help them, too."

The name has also been picked up by unrelated individuals online. A Manchester Twitter user using the handle Abu Qaqa voiced his approval of ISIL beheadings in Syria in 2014. Several blogs use the Abu Qaqa name to promote Islamic extremist views.

== See also ==
- Raphael Hostey
