= Nganzai =

- Local Government Area
- Interactive map of Nganzai
- Country: Nigeria
- State: Borno State
- Established: 1991
- Headquarters: Gajiram

Area
  - Total: 2,467 km^{2} (953 sq mi)
- Time zone: UTC+1 (WAT)
- Postal code: 612

Nganzai is a Local Government Area of Borno State in northeastern Nigeria. Nganzai LGA has an administrative headquarters in Gajiram town with the area council consisting communities and villages of Nganzai, Badu, Alarge, Damaram, Gadai, Kuda, Kurnawa, Maiwa, Miye, Sugundure, Gajiram and Sabsabuwa.

It's an Islamic region consisting of up to 90% Kanuris and 10% others. It has a population of over 100,000 people who were displace by terrorist group of Boko Haram and later resettled by his Babagana Umara Zulum.

The region is rich in agriculture and other mineral resources.

== Postal code ==
The postal code of the area is 612.

== History ==
It is one of the sixteen LGAs that constitute the Borno Emirate, a traditional state located in Borno State.

Jihadist groups carried out massacres in July 2019 and June 2020.

== Climate and geography ==
The average temperature of Nganzai LGA, which spans 2,467 square kilometres (953 square miles), is 34 degrees Celsius or 93 degrees Fahrenheit. The LGA experiences two different seasons, with an estimated 1,100 mm (43 in) of precipitation falling on the region annually.

Nganzai has a hot semi-arid climate with a short rainy season from June to September and a long dry season dominated by Harmattan winds. Temperatures stay high, usually between 26 °C (79 °F) and 41 °C (106 °F), while annual rainfall is generally between 450 mm (18 in) and 650 mm (26 in).

== Air pollution ==
The main source of Air pollution in Nganzai are Biomass burning from chocoal, dust storms and emissions from vehicles, electricity generator which cause health risks
