= Nganzai funeral attack =

2019 terrorist attack in Nigeria

- Part of the Boko Haram insurgency
- Nganzai funeral attack (Nigeria)
- Location: Nganzai District, Borno State, Nigeria
- Date: 27 July 2019; 10:30 GMT
- Target: Civilians returning from a funeral
- Attack type: Shooting
- Deaths: 65+
- Injuries: 10
- Perpetrator: Boko Haram

On 27 July 2019 a squad of Boko Haram terrorists opened fire on a group of people walking from a funeral in Nganzai District of Borno State, Nigeria. At least 65 people were killed in the attack and 10 injured people were hospitalized. The attack occurred as part of the Boko Haram insurgency.

== Attack ==
Around 10:30 GMT several Boko Haram extremists riding in motorbikes and vans opened fire on a large group of people returning to the village of Badu Kuluwu from a funeral in Goni Abachari. Angry mourners retaliated against the assault by attempting to chase after the terrorists, but were fired upon by the attacking convoy as it fled. In the aftermath of the attack 65 people were dead: 23 people were killed when the terrorists initially opened fire on the group and another 42 perished from gunfire while attempting to chase the gunmen.

== Response ==
Nigerian President Muhammad Buhari directed Nigeria's air and army forces to scour the area for the attackers after the attack. Nganzai local government chairman Muhammad Bulama confirmed a death toll of 65 people and 10 injuries in a statement to the media the next day. Bulimia labeled the terrorist attack as a reprisal attack, occurring in response to a civilian self-defense group killing 11 Boko Haram extremists while countering an ambush a week earlier.
