= Monguno =

- Local Government Area and town
- Interactive map of Monguno
- Coordinates: 12°41′0″N 13°36′0″E
- Country: Nigeria
- State: Borno State
- Headquarters: Monguno

Area
  - Total: 1,913 km^{2} (739 sq mi)

Population (2006)
  - Total: 109,851
  - Density: 57.42/km^{2} (148.7/sq mi)
- Time zone: UTC+1 (WAT)
- Postal code: 612

Monguno is one of the local government areas and a town in northern Borno State, in northeastern Nigeria.

== Area ==
Monguno has a total land area of 1,913 km^{2}.

== Population ==
Monguno had a population of 109,851 according to the 2006 census. It is the headquarters of Monguno Local Government Area in Borno State, northeastern Nigeria. The town is an important administrative and commercial centre for communities in the surrounding area.

== Postal code ==
The postal code of the area is 612.

== Climate ==
Typically, the temperature ranges from 15 °C (59 °F) to 42 °C (107 °F) all year round, with the wet season being hot and muggy and the dry season being windy, dry and less overcast.

== Air Pollution ==
Visible particulate matter emitted by vehicles is a significant threat to public health, particularly in the deepest parts of the lung, where it can exacerbate asthma attacks, bronchitis, and other lung diseases.

== Insurgency ==
In early January 2015, residents fled Monguno and the village of Doron-Baga for the internally displaced persons camps in Maiduguri, following the capture of nearby Bama by Boko Haram. Monguno was captured by Boko Haram forces on 26 January 2015. Amnesty International expressed concern that local residents' requests for more troops for protection from Boko Haram had been ignored by the Army. On 17 February 2015, the military retook Monguno in a coordinated air and ground assault. Boko Haram and ISWAP carried out bombings in June and September 2015 and a massacre in June 2020.
