= Prison breaks in Nigeria =

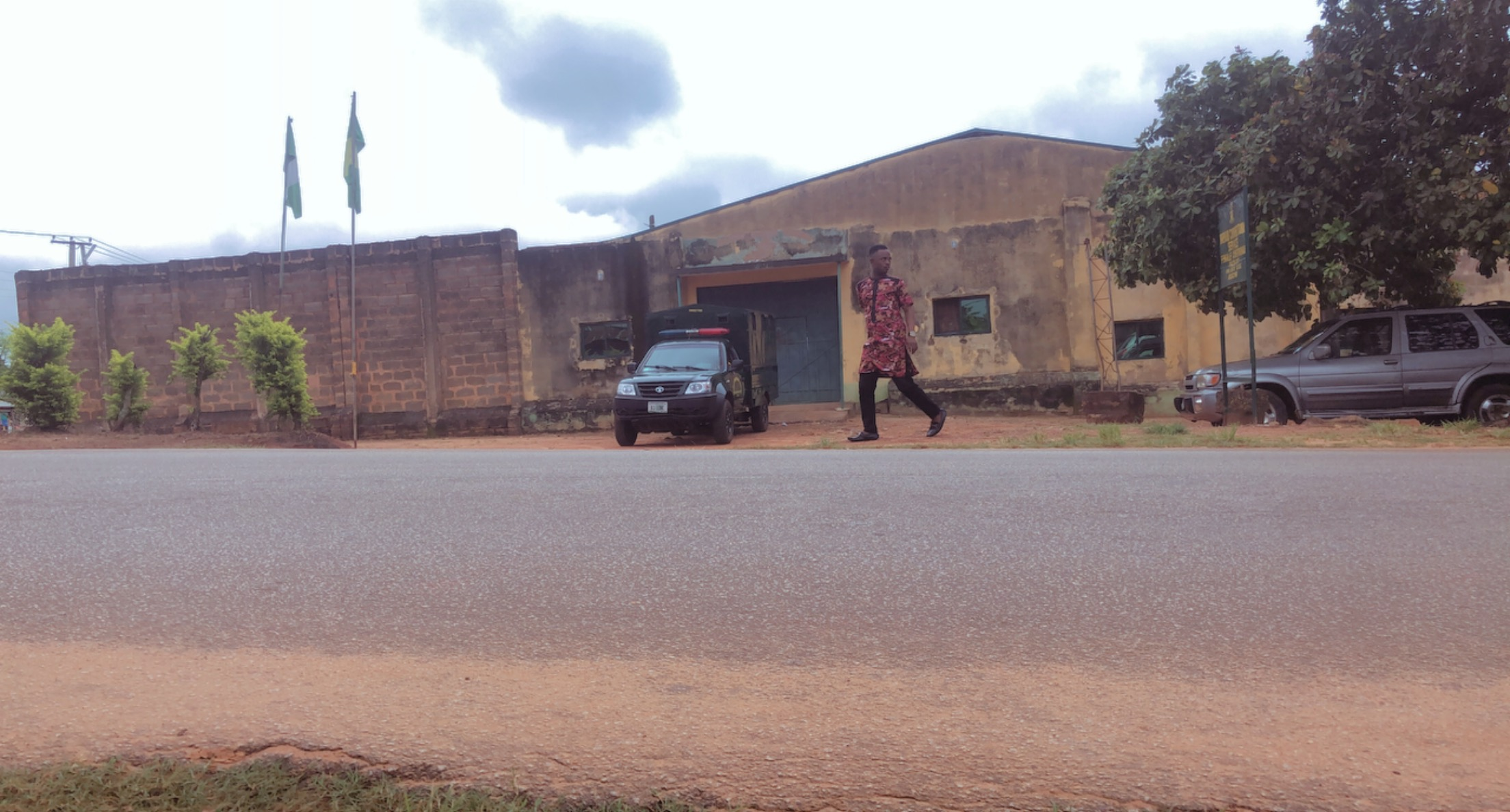

A prison break is an unlawful act under Nigerian law involving a prisoner escaping or forcing their way out of a prison. Prison breaks in Nigeria are also often the result of attacks on the Nigerian Correctional Service facilities by terrorist groups, including Boko Haram, or armed robbers, leading to the release of inmates. Efforts to recapture escaped inmates are typically coordinated by the Nigerian Correctional Service in conjunction with other security agencies. Escaped inmates, once apprehended, often face extended prison sentences.

Prison breaks in Nigeria have been attributed to systemic challenges such as corruption, underfunding of correctional facilities, and inadequate infrastructure. Many prisons lack essential security features such as closed-circuit television (CCTV) surveillance, motion detectors, high perimeter walls with barbed wire, and electrified fences.

Other factors contributing to prison breaks include overcrowding in correctional facilities, inadequate training of personnel, and delayed trials leading to frustration among awaiting-trial inmates. This has created a security vulnerability exploited by external attackers and organized groups. The Nigerian Correctional Service has been criticized for not adequately addressing these challenges.

In many cases, prison breaks are linked to larger security concerns within Nigeria, including terrorism and organized crime. Instances such as the Kuje prison attack in 2022 and other notable breaches illustrate the persistent threat posed to correctional facilities and the implications for public safety.

== Methods ==
Several methods can be used to facilitate prison break. Physical methods are the most common method adopted by the perpetrators of Nigerian prison breaks. These methods involve the use of arms and sometimes explosives (such as dynamite) to subdue the prison armed guard and other officials resulting in fatal casualties.

== Punishments ==
In Nigeria, prison break is a criminal offense that is punishable under the Law of Nigeria. The punishment varies depending on the nature of the attack, casualties involved in the attack and the nature of the offenses for which the participants were imprisoned.

== Reported cases ==
Prison breaks are a pervasive issue in Nigeria due to a lack of security and being a common target by militants. Prison breaks have resulted in the escape of over 7,000 prisoners from Nigerian prisons since 2010.

=== Agodi prison break ===
The Agodi prison break was an attack on the Agodi Minimum Security Prison in Ibadan, the capital of Oyo State, Nigeria by condemned criminals. It was reported that about eight inmates died in the attempt leaving eighteen others injured.

=== Bauchi prison break ===
On 7 September 2010, a prison break was reported in Bauchi prison in the northern Nigerian city of Bauchi by 50 gunmen suspected to be members of Boko Haram. This attack resulted in the escape of 721 prisoners, leaving 5 people dead with 6 injured persons.

=== Edo prison break (2012) ===
On 19 August 2012, a prison break was reported in Oko by unknown gunmen. It was reported that explosives were used in the attack, however, the police denied that claim. The reports had it that no deaths were recorded and no fewer than 10 inmates escaped.

=== Ogun prison break ===
On 4 January 2013, it was reported that Shagamu minimum prison in the southwestern Nigerian city of Ogun State was attacked resulting in the escape of 20 prisoners leaving several prison officials and other prisoners injured. About 4 escapee were rearrested by the Armed Squad of the Prison Service.

=== Ondo prison break ===
On 30 June 2013, it was reported that the Olokuta Medium Security Prison in Akure, the capital of Ondo State, Nigeria were attacked by 50 unknown gunmen suspected to be Armed robbers. The prison break resulted in the escape of 175 prisoners leaving 2 people dead and 1 warder injured. About 54 escapee were rearrested.

=== Lagos prison break ===
On 10 October 2014, an unsuccessful prison break at the Kirikiri Medium Prison in Lagos State, a southwestern Nigeria by some convicted inmates of the prison was reported. This incident left 20 prisoners dead and 80 others injured and 12 escaped.

=== Kogi prison break ===
On 2 November 2014, another prison break was reported in Koto-Karffi Federal Medium Security Prisons in Kogi State, in north-central Nigeria by numbers of gunmen suspected to be members of Boko Haram. This incident resulted in the escape of 144 prisoners from the prison leaving 1 inmate dead and 45 escaped prisoners were rearrested.

=== Ekiti prison break ===
On 30 November 2014, another attack on the federal prison at Ado Ekiti, a city of Ekiti State by 60 unknown gunmen was reported. This attack resulted in the escape of 341 prisoners leaving one prison official dead. About 10 prisoners were recaptured during the attack and 67 escapee was rearrested thereafter.

=== Minna prison break ===
On 6 December 2014, about a week after the Ekiti prison break, Minna medium prison was attacked by 3 unknown gunmen suspected to be armed robbers. This prison break resulted in the escape of 270 prisoners leaving 1 security officer injured with no death recorded.

=== Kuje prison break ===
On 24 June 2016, there was a jailbreak at the Kuje Medium Security in the Federal Capital Territory where two high-profile inmates in persons of Solomon Amodu and Maxwell Ajukwu both of them awaiting trial for homicide escaped from custody by scaling through the fence. The Kuje prison chief was removed after this jailbreak by the Controller General of the Nigerian Prison service.

On 29 August 2016, authorities of the Nigeria Prisons in the Federal Capital Territory reported another unsuccessful attempted jailbreak at the Kuje Medium Security Prison. Authorities said some inmates tried to resist the routine cell-search which is part of the operational guidelines which led to an altercation between the officers and the inmates. The situation was quickly put under control and order restored as no prisoner was injured or any property damaged in the facility.

=== Edo prison break (2020) ===
On 19 October 2020, a group of people under the disguise of ENDSARs protesters, allegedly attacked the prisons in Benin City and Oko in Edo State freeing about 1,993 inmates in custody and looted the facility carting away weapons. The attackers came in large numbers with dangerous weapons and attacked the officers on guard duty and quickly forced the cells open and destroyed properties in the facility.

=== Owerri prison break ===
On 5 April 2021, a group believed to be Eastern Security Network attacked Owerri Prison in Owerri, Imo State. ESN came into the prison heavily armed with machine guns, rocket-propelled grenades and improvised explosive devices. The militants used explosives to access the administrative block and released 1,844 inmates and also burnt down other police facilities within the vicinity of the prison.

=== Federal Capital Territory (FCT) ===
- Kuje Prison (July 5, 2022): A coordinated attack by the Islamic State West Africa Province (ISWAP) led to the escape of 879 inmates, including 64 terrorists. The attackers used explosives and firearms, resulting in casualties among security personnel and inmates. This was one of Nigeria's most prominent prison breaks in recent years.

=== Delta State ===
- Agbor Prison (May 13, 2022): Following heavy rainfall, the northern perimeter wall of the prison collapsed, allowing three inmates to escape. This incident highlighted infrastructural vulnerabilities in Nigerian prisons.

=== Kwara State ===
- Mandala Custodial Centre, Ilorin (January 2, 2022): Three inmates escaped under unclear circumstances, marking the year's first reported jailbreak.

=== Imo State ===
- Owerri Correctional Centre (April 2022): Although reports for 2022 were minimal, the 2021 attack on this facility, allegedly carried out by the Eastern Security Network (a militia wing of IPOB), continued to draw attention due to ongoing security concerns in the region.
