= Boko Haram =

African jihadist organisation

Jama'at Ahl al-Sunna li al-Da'wa wa al-Jihad
- Flag Emblem
- Leaders: Mohammed Yusuf (executed) (2002–2009); Mallam Sani Umaru (acting) (2009); Abubakar Shekau (2009–2016); Abu Musab al-Barnawi (2016); Abubakar Shekau ‡‡ (2016–2021); Bakura Sahalaba † (2021–2022); Bakura Doro (2022–present)
- Dates active: 2002–present
- Allegiance: Islamic State
- Group: Ansaru (2009–2012)
- Headquarters: Gwoza, Borno, Nigeria (July 2009 – March 2015); Marte, Borno, Nigeria (April–September 2015); Sambisa Forest, Borno, Nigeria (March 2015 – May 2021); Chikun, Kaduna, Nigeria (September 2021 – present)
- Active regions: Nigeria, northern Cameroon, Niger, Chad, Mali
- Ideology: Bokoharamism: Hazimism; Sunni Islamism; Islamic extremism; Islamic fundamentalism; Salafi jihadism; Wahhabism; Takfirism; Anti-Western sentiment; Shiaphobia; Christianophobia
- Size: At least 15,000 (Amnesty International claim, January 2015); 20,000 (Chad claim, March 2015); 4,000–6,000 (United States claim, February 2015)
- Part of: Islamic State (2015–2016)
- Wars: Insurgency in the Maghreb; War in the Sahel; Operation Juniper Shield; Boko Haram insurgency; 2009 Boko Haram uprising; Battle of Konduga (2014); January 2015 raid on Kolofata; Battle of Damboa; Battle of Konduga (2015); 2015 West African offensive; Islamist insurgency in Niger; 2015 Niger raid; Battle of Damasak; Chad Basin campaign; Boko Haram–ISWAP conflict; Battle of Sambisa Forest; United States intervention in Nigeria; Mali War; Battle of Gao; Battle of Konna; Operation Serval; Battle of Diabaly; Battle of Ifoghas; Nigerian bandit conflict

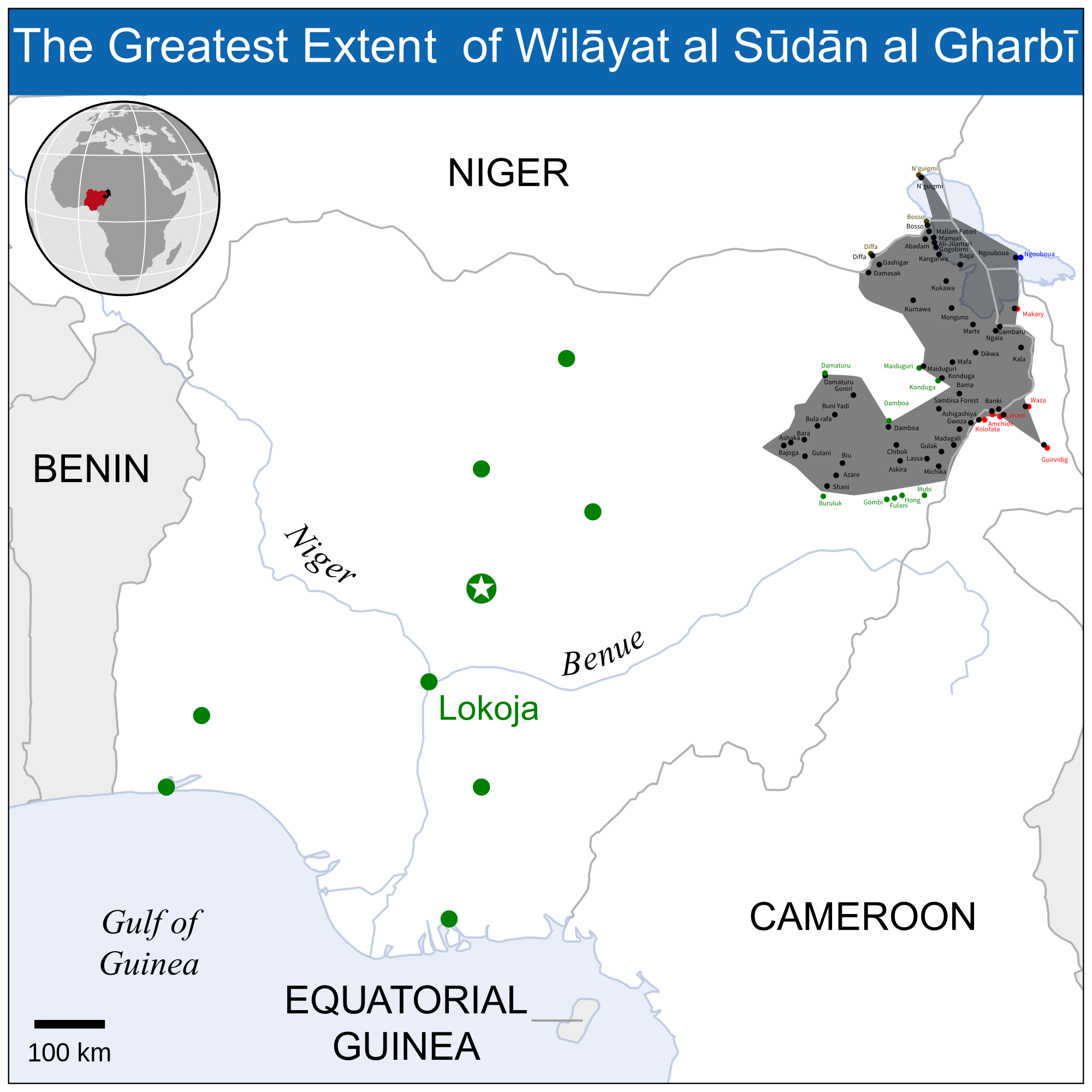
The maximum extent of Boko Haram in January 2015 shown in dark grey

Boko Haram, (Note: Hausa pronunciation: [bóː.kòː hà.râm]; Boko means fake and is often said of Western education and haram means forbidden so the name Boko Haram translates to "Western education is forbidden".) officially known as Jama'at Ahl al-Sunna li al-Da'wa wa al-Jihad (JAS) (Note: Arabic: جماعة أهل السنة للدعوة والجهاد, romanised: Jamā'at Ahl as-Sunnah lid-Da'wah wa'l-Jihād, lit. 'Group of the People of Sunnah for Dawah and Jihad') and sometimes referred to as it Daular Musulunci, is a jihadist militant organisation based in northeastern Nigeria and also active in Chad, Niger, northern Cameroon, and Mali.

Founded by Mohammed Yusuf in 2002, the group was led by Abubakar Shekau from 2009 until his death in 2021 during the Battle of Sambisa Forest, although it splintered into other groups after Yusuf's death in 2009, as well as in 2015. When the group was first formed, their main goal was to "purify" the Sunni Islam in northern Nigeria, believing jihad should be delayed until the group was strong enough to overthrow the Nigerian government. The group formerly aligned itself with the Islamic State of Iraq and the Levant. The group has been known for its brutality, and since the insurgency started in 2009, Boko Haram has killed tens of thousands of people, in frequent attacks against the police, armed forces and civilians. The conflict has resulted in the deaths of more than 300,000 children and has displaced 2.3 million from their homes. Boko Haram has contributed to regional food crises and famines.

After its founding in 2002, Boko Haram's increasing radicalisation led to the suppression operation by the Nigerian military and the killing of Yusuf in July 2009. Its unexpected resurgence, following a mass prison break in September 2010 in Bauchi, was accompanied by increasingly sophisticated attacks, initially against soft targets, but progressing in 2011 to include suicide bombings of police buildings and the United Nations office in Abuja. The government's establishment of a state of emergency at the beginning of 2012, extended in the following year to cover the entire northeast of Nigeria, led to an increase in both security force abuses and militant attacks.

Of the 2.3 million people displaced by the conflict since May 2013, at least 250,000 left Nigeria and fled to Cameroon, Chad or Niger. Boko Haram killed over 6,600 people in 2014. The group has carried out massacres including the killing by fire of 59 schoolboys in February 2014 and mass abductions including the kidnapping of 276 schoolgirls in Chibok, Borno State, Nigeria, in April 2014. Corruption and human rights abuses in the security services have hampered efforts to counter the unrest.

In mid-2014, the militants gained control of swaths of territory in and around their home state of Borno, estimated at 50,000 square kilometres (20,000 sq mi) in January 2015, but did not capture the state capital, Maiduguri, where the group was originally based. On 7 March 2015, Boko Haram's leader Abubakar Shekau pledged allegiance to the Islamic State of Iraq and the Levant. According to the BBC, due to internal disputes between the two groups, hundreds of militants left Boko Haram and formed their own organisation, named "Islamic State's West Africa Province". In September 2015, the director of information at the Defence Headquarters of Nigeria announced that all Boko Haram camps had been destroyed but attacks from the group continue. In 2019, the president of Nigeria, Muhammadu Buhari, claimed that Boko Haram was "technically defeated". Shekau was killed and confirmed to be dead in May 2021. Despite this, Boko Haram experienced a subsequent revival under a new leader, Bakura Doro.

== Name ==
The organisation's name has been Group of the People of Sunnah for Dawa and Jihad (Arabic: جماعة أهل السنة للدعوة والجهاد, romanised: Jamā'atu Ahli is-Sunnah lid-Da'wati wal-Jihād). It was also known as the West African Province (Wilayat Garb Ifrqiya), and, after pledging allegiance to Islamic State in 2015, was briefly called Islamic State in West Africa (ISWA) or Islamic State's West African Province (ISWAP). The group fractured in 2016, however, and ISWAP and Boko Haram are now separate groups.

The name Boko Haram is a shortening of the Hausa phrase, "Ilimin boko haramun ne", which is usually translated as "Western education is forbidden". "Haram" is from the Arabic حَرَام (ḥarām, "forbidden") and the Hausa word boko (the first vowel is long, the second pronounced in a low tone), meaning "fake", a word used to refer to secular Western education. In a 2009 statement they denounced that translation as the work of the "infidel media", claiming the true translation is "Western Civilization is forbidden", and that they are not "opposed to formal education coming from the West" but "believe in the supremacy of Islamic culture (not education)". Other translations in English include "Western influence is a sin", and "Westernization is sacrilege".

Until the death of its founder Mohammed Yusuf, the group was also reportedly known as Yusifiyya. Northern Nigerians have commonly dismissed Western education as ilimin boko ("fake education") and secular schools as makaranta boko ("fake school").

== Causes, ideology, and takfir ==
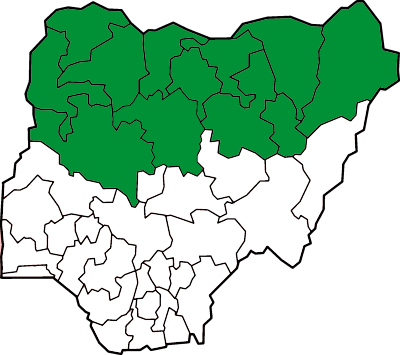
Nigerian states with sharia law shown in green

=== Causes/contributors ===
==== Economic ====
Some analysts have emphasised economic causes as a factor in Boko Haram's success. Wealth in Nigeria has been concentrated among members of a small political elite. Nigeria is Africa's biggest economy, but 60% of its population of 173 million (as of 2013) live on less than $1 a day.

==== Religious ====
The sharia law imposed by local authorities, beginning with Zamfara in January 2000 and covering 12 northern states by late 2002, may have promoted links between Boko Haram and political leaders, but was considered by the group to have been corrupted.

==== Extant resentment of colonialism ====
Academic Atta Barkindo explains the group's "baffling" ability to "maintain momentum" in part by the "accumulated and unaddressed grievances" against colonialism in the region, including the colonial boundaries (of Nigeria, Ghana, etc.) established by Europeans that bear no resemblance to "pre-colonial empires, ethnic or cultural territories", and by the group's use of the "historical narrative" of the Islamic Kanem–Bornu Empire. Mohammad Yusuf preached that, "our land was an Islamic state before it was turned into a land of kafir (infidel); the current system is contrary to true Muslim beliefs".

==== Illiteracy/lack of education ====
In a discussion organised by the Woodrow Wilson Center, Chief Olusegun Obasanjo, a former president of Nigeria, highlighted the low level of literacy and education in the Northern parts of the country as contributing to the perpetuation of Boko Haram. According to Obasanjo, illiterate and uneducated children are more likely to be drawn in.

=== Ideology ===
The founder of Boko Haram, Muhammad Yusuf, was reportedly inspired by the controversial Islamic preacher Mohammed Marwa (Maitatsine), who condemned the reading of any books other than the Quran. In one 2009 interview, Yusuf expressed his opposition not only to Western education, but to the theory of evolution, a spherical Earth, and to the idea that rain comes from "evaporation caused by the sun" rather than being created and sent down directly by God.

Boko Haram opposes the Westernisation of Nigerian society, which it blames for "Nigeria's culture of corruption", and demands the establishment of an Islamic state in Nigeria. It developed into a jihadist group in 2009. As Sunni Salafi Jihadis, the group strives to re-establish the Islamic caliphate and bring all peoples under its domain, doing away with modern states and patriotic feeling towards them. After Boko Haram declared its allegiance to the Islamic State, an IS statement proclaimed "It was the rejection of nationalism that drove the mujahidin in Nigeria to give bay'ah (fealty) to the Islamic State and wage war against the Nigerian murtaddin (apostates) fighting for the Nigerian taghut (idolatrous tyrant)". The movement is diffuse, and fighters who are associated with it follow the Salafi doctrine.

==== Takfir ====
Members' beliefs tend to be centred on strict adherence to Wahhabism, which is an extremely strict form of Sunni Islam that sees many other forms of Islam as idolatrous.

The group has denounced Sufis and the members of the Shiite sects as infidels, and also mainstream Sunni Muslims who fail to support their jihad. This willingness to takfir – i.e. accuse self-professed Muslims of being apostates from Islam and thus subject to execution – is a departure from mainstream Islam but not Salafi jihadism.

An insurgent aiming to overthrow a Muslim government faces a challenge due to mainstream Islamic doctrine, which forbids the killing or enslaving of fellow Muslims, including government officials, military personnel, or ordinary Muslims who don't support the insurgency. However, by using takfir—declaring opponents as apostates—the insurgents not only bypass this prohibition but also turn the killing of these Muslims into a "religious duty". In a 18 December 2016 speech to his commanders, Shekau proclaimed that 'even if a woman is praying and fasting, once she engages in democracy I can capture her in a battle'.

Some scholars have characterised Boko Haram's ideology as a "militant Salafi-jihadist" version of Islamic ideologies which deplores secular governments, educational and legal systems, preferring a governance system in accordance with Boko Haram's understanding of Islamic law. Many people translate the group's name as "Western education is not allowed", but according to researchers it is more than just a matter of formal education, as they also reject political spheres they see to be incompatible with their religious world, or the authority of the government itself and any norms of society.

Interpretations of this resilience make use of two sets of ideas, ideological and organisational. Several groups of experts point to two sets of ideas as explanations of the group's resilience, namely, ideological and organisational. It appears that its ideology has served the movement well in helping with bisociation in situations of leadership change, military pressure and intra-factionalism, according to studies. Other reasons suggested for recruitment have been political marginalisation, poverty, unemployment, lack of education and insecurities, as well as differences over or dissatisfaction with state institutions. Such issues have made the group's messages more attractive than ever in certain communities where they are operating, along with the recruitment methods the group employs. These conditions have made it more appealing to the group's messages (in some affected communities) and its recruitment practices.

Meanwhile, another group of scholars believes Boko Haram's ideology has long changed as a result of both internal squabbles and military engagements and is still largely committed to the notion of the utopia of a religiously-based society. The movement's propaganda and recruitment techniques have been tailored to different audiences; the younger generation and local communities, and its messages have been religious, political and socio-economic. Researchers have therefore tended to explain this persisting group recruitment with a combination of the group's ideological appeal, the problems and grievances of the people in the north-eastern Nigeria and adjacent areas, as well as the problems of governance and conflicts in these areas.

According to researchers Jacob Zenna and Zacharias Pier,

after 2010 ... Shekau, believed that jihad was obligatory and that not actively joining his jihad was tantamount to apostasy. This did not mean Shekau actively killed anyone after he announced jihad and renamed the group "JAS" in 2010. Rather, there was a "priority scale" with Christians, the government and publicly anti-JAS Muslim preachers targeted first. This also meant any Muslims killed collaterally were not a concern since they were "guilty" for not having joined his jihad. ... [by] October 2010, ... assassinations targeting Muslim religious leaders, especially Salafists who opposed JAS's religious interpretation, as well as civil servants, became an almost weekly occurrence in northeastern Nigeria. In addition to this, prisons, banks, mosques, churches and beer halls also were common targets of attack.

== History ==
Logo of Boko Haram (2002–15)

=== Background ===
Before it was colonised and subsequently incorporated into the British Empire as Colonial Nigeria in 1900, the Bornu Empire ruled the territory where Boko Haram is currently active. It was a sovereign sultanate run according to the principles of the Constitution of Medina, with a majority Kanuri Muslim population. In 1903 the Sokoto Caliphate (and parts of the Borno Emirate) had come under mostly British rule, and in the Adamawa Wars to German rule in its eastern provinces. At this time, Christian missionaries spread the Christian message in the region and converted a large segment of the Nigerian populace. British rule ended when Nigeria was granted independence in 1960. Except for a brief period of civilian rule between 1979 and 1983, Nigeria was governed by a series of military dictatorships from 1966 until the advent of democracy in 1999.

According to the Borno Sufi Imam Sheik Fatahi, Yusuf was trained by the Kano Salafi Izala Sheik Ja'afar Mahmud Adamu, who called him the "leader of young people"; the two split some time in 2002–2004. They both preached in Maiduguri's Indimi Mosque, which was attended by the deputy governor of Borno. Many of the group were reportedly inspired by Mohammed Marwa, known as Maitatsine ("He who curses others"), a self-proclaimed prophet (annabi, a Hausa word usually used only to describe the founder of Islam) born in Northern Cameroon who condemned the reading of books other than the Quran. In a 2009 BBC interview, Yusuf expressed similarly pre-modern ideas on evolution, a flat earth, and rain sent directly from God rather than evaporation. Followers of Maitatsine "wreaked havoc" in northern cities of Nigeria "off and on" from 1980 to 1985.

Ethnic militancy is thought to have been one of the causes of the 1967–1970 civil war; religious violence reached a new height in 1980 in Kano, the largest city in the north of the country, where the Muslim fundamentalist sect Yan Tatsine ("followers of Maitatsine") instigated riots that resulted in four or five thousand deaths. In the ensuing military crackdown, Maitatsine was killed, fuelling a backlash of increased violence that spread across other northern cities over the next twenty years. Social inequality and poverty contributed both to the Maitatsine and Boko Haram uprisings.

In the decades since the end of British rule, politicians and academics from the mainly Islamic North have expressed their fundamental opposition to Western education. Political ethno-religious interest groups, whose membership includes influential political, military and religious leaders, have thrived in Nigeria, though they were largely suppressed under military rule. Their paramilitary wings, formed since the country's return to civilian rule, have been implicated in much of the sectarian violence in the years following. The Arewa People's Congress, the militia wing of the Arewa Consultative Forum, the main political group representing the interests of northern Nigeria, is a well-funded group with military and intelligence expertise and is considered capable of engaging in military action, including covert bombing.

=== Founding ===
Mohammed Yusuf founded the sect that became known as Boko Haram in 2002 in Maiduguri, the capital of the north-eastern state of Borno. He established a religious complex and school that attracted poor Muslim families from across Nigeria and neighbouring countries. The centre had the political goal of creating an Islamic state, and became a recruiting ground for jihadis. By denouncing the police and state corruption, Yusuf attracted followers from unemployed youth. He is reported to have used the existing infrastructure of the Izala Society (Jama'at Izalatil Bidiawa Iqamatus Sunnah), a popular conservative Islamic sect, to recruit members, before breaking away to form his own faction. The Izala were originally welcomed into government, along with people sympathetic to Yusuf. Boko Haram conducted its operations more or less peacefully during the first seven years of its existence, withdrawing from society into remote north-eastern areas, believing it was important to develop strength before waging jihad. The government repeatedly ignored warnings about the increasingly militant character of the organisation. The Council of Ulama advised the government and the Nigerian Television Authority not to broadcast Yusuf's preaching, but their warnings were ignored. Yusuf's arrest elevated him to hero status. Stephen Davis, a former Anglican clergyman who has negotiated with Boko Haram many times blames local Nigerian politicians who support local bandits like Boko Haram in order for them to make life difficult for their political opponents. In particular Davis has blamed the former governor of Borno State Ali Modu Sheriff, who initially supported Boko Haram, but no longer needed them after the 2007 elections and stopped funding them. Sheriff denies the accusations.

=== Rivalry with ISIL ===
Boko Haram and ISIL were initially allies. However, the two groups became enemies due to territorial disputes, because ISIL tried to conquer the zones which were under Boko Haram's control.

In July 2014, Shekau released a 16-minute video in which he voiced his support for ISIL's leader Abu Bakr al-Baghdadi, al-Qaeda's leader Ayman al-Zawahiri and the Afghan Taliban's leader Mullah Omar. In March 2015, Shekau pledged allegiance to ISIS self-styled caliph Abu Bakr Al-Baghdadi and became "West African Province" (Wilayat Garb Ifriqiyah), i.e. the West African province of the Islamic State. However, in August 2016, Al-Baghdadi replaced Shekau with Abu Musab al-Barnawi, the son of the Boko Haram's previous leader Muhammad Yusuf, their motivation (at least according to one source) being to trim back Shekau's tendency to apply takfir (accusations of apostasy) to "all mainstream Muslims".

Shortly before Boko Haram pledged allegiance to ISIL, the Nigerian government launched the 2015 West African offensive during which Boko Haram lost most of the territory which it had occupied over time. Following this offensive, the group retreated to the Sambisa Forest and commenced its guerilla warfare tactics.

In August 2016, ISIL attempted to remove Shekau from his leadership role and replace him with Abu Musab al-Barnawi. ISIL attempted to remove Shekau because he had disobeyed Abu Bakr al-Baghdadi's order to cease targeting Muslim civilians. Shekau rejected the move, leading to a split between the groups. As of 2017, there were three factions which were all Boko Haram in origin, all rejecting "democracy, secularism and Western influence", and seeking to establish an Islamic state implementing sharia. These were the "West African Province" which is part of ISIL; "Jamā'at Ahl as-Sunnah lid-Da'wah wa'l-Jihād" (Boko Haram), under Shekau's control; and "Ansaru" which is loyal to al-Qaeda and rejected the caliphate of al-Bagdadi, though it shares his disapproval of the "wide-reaching interpretation of takfir" of Shekau.

Since 2018, there has been a major spike in attacks by Boko Haram, (concentrated in Borno State), which sought to prove Boko Haram to be the prevalent terror group in the country. Attacks by Boko Haram resulted in over 1700 fatalities in the first half of 2019, including casualties of its own members. When climate change-induced poverty and violence struck the Lake Chad basin, the terrorist organisation was able to recruit in large numbers by offering small loans and promising big rewards. It also continues to kidnap and force young boys to join them. Boko Haram is better equipped with drones, weapons and vehicles captured from and sometimes abandoned by Nigerian military during ambush. To better fortify itself, Nigerian military has concentrated the rural population in its garrison towns. This has allowed Boko Haram to operate freely in the countryside. In 2019 they were believed to be back in control of 4 out of 10 zones of Borno State.

For at least four years since the split happened, the two groups were not enemies and sometimes co-operated in some terror attacks. However, Boko Haram and ISWAP later became enemies since 2021 or even a year before. ISWAP gunmen targeted Shekau in an attack carried out on 20 May 2021. Several Boko Haram members were killed in the operation, while Shekau blew himself up, or tried to do so, in order to avoid a capture. It was the first major clash between the two groups. His death was confirmed by his loyalists led by Sahalaba in June.

== Campaign of violence ==
Boko Haram's attacks consist of suicide bombings as well as conventional armed assaults on both civilian and military targets. Following the Chibok kidnapping in 2014, the majority of Boko Haram's suicide bombers are female; many are teenagers and the youngest was seven. Boko Haram jihadists rely on stealth, blending into local communities or hiding in the vast countryside. Critics accuse the Nigerian military of not properly equipping its soldiers to fight Boko Haram.

=== 2009 ===
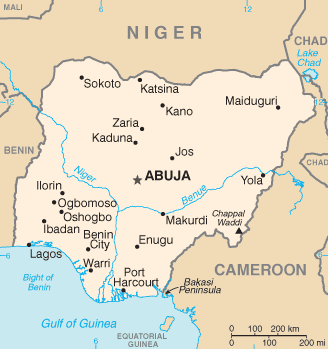
Map of Nigeria from the CIA World Factbook

==== Uprising ====
In 2009, police began an investigation into the group, code-named Operation Flush. On 26 July, security forces arrested nine Boko Haram members and confiscated weapons and bomb-making equipment. Either this or a clash with police during a funeral procession led to revenge attacks on police and widespread rioting in Bauchi, Maiduguri, Potiskum in Yobe State and Wudil in Kano State. A joint military task force operation was launched in response. By 30 July, more than 700 people had been killed; police stations, prisons, government offices, schools and churches had been destroyed. Yusuf was arrested, and died in custody "while trying to escape". As had been the case decades earlier in the wake of the 1980 Kano riots, the killing of the leader of an extremist group would have unintended consequences. He was succeeded by Abubakar Shekau, formerly his second-in-command.

=== 2010 ===
==== Bauchi prison break ====
On 7 September, having regrouped under their new leader, Boko Haram broke 105 of its members out of prison in Bauchi along with over 600 other prisoners. The group went on to intensify their insurgency, launching many attacks in Nigeria, mostly in the north of the country.

==== Jos and Maiduguri attacks ====
On 24 December, Boko Haram detonated four bombs in Jos and attacked two churches in Maiduguri.

==== December Abuja bombing ====
On 31 December, Boko Haram bombed a barracks in Abuja, killing four civilians.

=== 2011 ===
Under Shekau's leadership, the group continuously improved its operational capabilities. It launched a string of IED attacks against soft targets and its first vehicle-borne IED attack on 16 June 2011, killing six at Abuja's police headquarters. On 26 August, Boko Haram bombed the United Nations (UN) headquarters in Abuja, the first time they had struck a Western target. A spokesman claiming responsibility for the attack, in which 11 UN staff members died as well as 12 others, with more than 100 injured, warned of future planned attacks on U.S. and Nigerian government interests. Speaking soon after the U.S. embassy's announcement of the arrival in the country of the FBI, he went on to announce Boko Haram's terms for negotiation, i.e. the release of all imprisoned members. The increased sophistication of the group led observers to speculate that Boko Haram was affiliated with Al-Qaeda in the Islamic Maghreb (AQIM), which was active in Niger.

Boko Haram has maintained a steady rate of attacks since 2011, striking a wide range of targets, multiple times per week. They have attacked politicians, religious leaders, security forces and civilian targets. The tactic of suicide bombing, used in the two attacks in the capital – on the police and UN headquarters – was new to Nigeria. In Africa as a whole, it had only been used by al-Shabaab in Somalia and to a lesser extent AQIM.

==== Presidential inauguration ====
Within hours of Goodluck Jonathan's presidential inauguration on 29 May 2011, Boko Haram carried out a series of bombings in Bauchi, Zaria and Abuja. The most successful of these was the attack on the army barracks in Bauchi. A spokesman for the group told BBC Hausa that the attack had been carried out, as a test of loyalty, by serving members of the military hoping to join the group. This charge was later refuted by an army spokesman who claimed: "This is not a banana republic". However, on 8 January 2012 the president said that Boko Haram had infiltrated both the army and the police, as well as the executive, parliamentary and legislative branches of government. Boko Haram's spokesman also claimed responsibility for the killing outside his home in Maiduguri of the politician Abba Anas Ibn Umar Garbai, the younger brother of the Shehu of Borno, who was the second most prominent Muslim in the country after the Sultan of Sokoto. He added: "We are doing what we are doing to fight injustice, if they stop their satanic ways of doing things and the injustices, we would stop what we are doing".

This was one of several political and religious assassinations Boko Haram carried out that year, with the presumed intention of correcting what they say are injustices in the group's home state of Borno. Meanwhile, the trail of massacres continued relentlessly, apparently leading the country towards civil war. By the end of 2011, these conflicting strategies led observers to question the group's cohesion; comparisons were drawn with the diverse motivations of the militant factions of the oil-rich Niger Delta. Adding to the confusion, in November the State Security Service announced that four criminal syndicates were operating under the name Boko Haram.

The common theme throughout the northeast was the targeting of police, who were regularly killed at work or in drive-by shootings at their homes, either in revenge for the killing of Yusuf, or as representatives of the state apparatus, or for no particular reason. Five officers were arrested for Yusuf's murder, which had no noticeable effect on the level of unrest. Opportunities for criminal enterprise flourished. Hundreds of police were dead and more than 60 police stations had been attacked by mid-2012. The government's response to this self-reinforcing trend towards insecurity was to invest heavily in security equipment, spending $5.5 billion, 20% of their overall budget, on bomb detection units, communications and transport; and $470 million on a Chinese CCTV system for Abuja, which has failed in its purpose of detecting or deterring acts of terror.

The election defeat of former military dictator Muhammadu Buhari increased ethno-religious political tensions, as it broke the terms of a tacit agreement that the presidency would alternate after two terms of office between candidates from the Christian south and Muslim north of the country. Sectarian riots engulfed the twelve northern states of the country during the three days following the election, leaving more than 800 dead and 65,000 displaced.

The subsequent campaign of violence by Boko Haram culminated in a string of bombings across the country on Christmas Day. In the outskirts of Abuja, 37 died in a church that had its roof blown off. One resident commented, "Cars were in flames and bodies littered everywhere", a phrase commonly repeated in international press reports about the bombings. Similar Christmas events had been reported in previous years. Jonathan declared a state of emergency on New Year's Eve in local government areas of Jos, Borno, Yobe and Niger and closed the international border in the north-east.

=== 2012 ===
==== State of emergency ====
Three days later they began a series of mostly small-scale attacks on Christians and members of the Igbo ethnic group, causing hundreds to flee. In Kano, on 20 January, they carried out by far their most deadly action yet, an assault on police buildings, killing 190. One of the victims was a TV reporter. The attacks included a combined use of car bombs, suicide bombers and IEDs, supported by uniformed gunmen.

Amnesty International and Human Rights Watch published reports in 2012 that were widely quoted by government agencies and the media, based on research conducted over the course of the conflict in the worst affected areas of the country. The NGOs were critical of both security forces and Boko Haram. HRW stated "Boko Haram should immediately cease all attacks, and threats of attacks, that cause loss of life, injury, and destruction of property. The Nigerian government should take urgent measures to address the human rights abuses that have helped fuel the violent militancy". According to the 2012 US Department of State Country Report on Human Rights Practices:

[S]erious human rights problems included extrajudicial killings by security forces, including summary executions; security force torture, rape, and other cruel, inhuman, or degrading treatment of prisoners, detainees, and criminal suspects; harsh and life-threatening prison and detention centre conditions; arbitrary arrest and detention; prolonged pretrial detention; denial of fair public trial; executive influence on the judiciary; infringements on citizens' privacy rights; restrictions on freedom of speech, press, assembly, religion, and movement.

On 9 October, witnesses in Maiduguri claimed members of the JTF "Restore Order" [a vigilante group], based in Maiduguri, went on a killing spree after a suspected Boko Haram bomb killed an officer. Media reported the JTF killed 20 to 45 civilians and razed 50 to 100 houses in the neighbourhood. The JTF commander in Maiduguri denied the allegations. On 2 November, witnesses claimed the JTF shot and killed up to 40 people during raids in Maiduguri. The army claimed it dismissed some officers from the military as a result of alleged abuses committed in Maiduguri, but there were no known formal prosecutions in Maiduguri by year's end.

Credible reports also indicated ... uniformed military personnel and paramilitary mobile police carried out summary executions, assaults, torture, and other abuses throughout Bauchi, Borno, Kano, Kaduna, Plateau, and Yobe states ... The national police, army, and other security forces committed extrajudicial killings and used lethal and excessive force to apprehend criminals and suspects, as well as to disperse protesters. Authorities generally did not hold police accountable for the use of excessive or deadly force or for the deaths of persons in custody. Security forces generally operated with impunity in the illegal apprehension, detention, and sometimes extrajudicial execution of criminal suspects. The reports of state or federal panels of inquiry investigating suspicious deaths remained unpublished.

There were no new developments in the case of five police officers accused of executing Muhammad Yusuf in 2009 at a state police headquarters. In July 2011, authorities arraigned five police officers in the federal high court in Abuja for the murder of Yusuf. The court granted bail to four of the officers, while one remained in custody.

Police use of excessive force, including use of live ammunition, to disperse demonstrators resulted in numerous killings during the year. For example, although the January fuel subsidy demonstrations generally remained peaceful, security forces reportedly fired on protesters in various states across the country during those demonstrations, resulting in 10 to 15 deaths and an unknown number of wounded.

Despite some improvements resulting from the closure of police checkpoints in many parts of the country, states with an increased security presence due to the activities of Boko Haram experienced a rise in violence and lethal force at police and military roadblocks.

Continuing abductions of civilians by criminal groups occurred in the Niger Delta and Southeast ... Police and other security forces were often implicated in the kidnapping schemes.

Although the constitution and law prohibit such practices and provide for punishment of such abuses, torture is not criminalised, and security service personnel, including police, military, and State Security Service (SSS) officers, regularly tortured, beat, and abused demonstrators, criminal suspects, detainees, and convicted prisoners. Police mistreated civilians to extort money. The law prohibits the introduction into trials of evidence and confessions obtained through torture; however, police often used torture to extract confessions.

=== 2013 ===
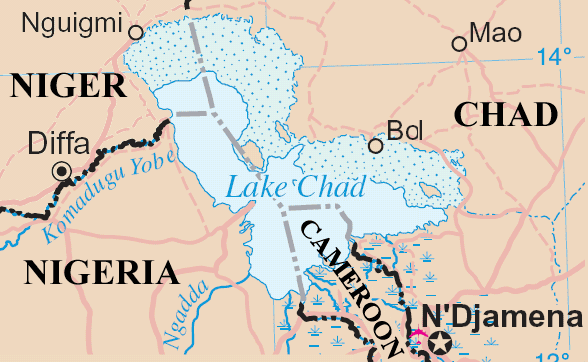
Lake Chad

Nigeria's Borno State, where Boko Haram is based, adjoins Lake Chad as do Niger, Cameroon and the country of Chad. The conflict and refugees spilled over the national borders to involve all four countries.

In 2013, Boko Haram increased operations in Northern Cameroon, and were involved in skirmishes along the borders of Chad and Niger. They were linked to a number of kidnappings, often reportedly in association with the splinter group Ansaru, drawing towards them a higher level of international attention.

The U.S. Bureau of Counterterrorism provides the following summary of Boko Haram's 2013 foreign operations:

In February 2013, Boko Haram was responsible for kidnapping seven French tourists in the far north of Cameroon. In November 2013, Boko Haram members kidnapped a French priest in Cameroon. In December 2013, Boko Haram gunmen reportedly attacked civilians in several areas of northern Cameroon. Security forces from Chad and Niger also reportedly partook in skirmishes against suspected Boko Haram members along Nigeria's borders. In 2013, the group also kidnapped eight French citizens in northern Cameroon and obtained ransom payments for their release.

Boko Haram has often managed to evade the Nigerian Army by retreating into the hills around the border with Cameroon, whose army is apparently unwilling to confront them. Nigeria, Chad and Niger had formed a Multinational Joint Task Force in 1998. In February 2012, Cameroon signed an agreement with Nigeria to establish a Joint Trans-Border Security Committee, which was inaugurated in November 2013, when Cameroon announced plans to conduct "coordinated but separate" border patrols in 2014. It convened again in July 2014 to further improve cooperation between the two countries.

In late 2013, Amnesty International received 'credible' information that over 950 inmates had died in custody, mostly in detention centres in Maiduguri and Damaturu, within the first half of the year. Official state corruption was also documented in December 2013 by the UK Home Office:

The NPF [Nigeria Police Force], SSS, and military report to civilian authorities; however, these security services periodically act outside of civilian control. The government lack effective mechanisms to investigate and punish abuse and corruption. The NPF remain susceptible to corruption, commit human rights abuses, and generally operate with impunity in the apprehension, illegal detention, and sometimes execution of criminal suspects. The SSS also commit human rights abuses, particularly in restricting freedom of speech and press. In some cases private citizens or the government brought charges against perpetrators of human rights abuses in these units. However, most cases lingered in court or went unresolved after an initial investigation.

The state of emergency was extended in May 2013 to cover the whole of the three north-eastern states of Borno, Adamawa and Yobe, raising tensions in the region. In the 12 months following the announcement, 250,000 fled the three states, followed by a further 180,000 between May and August 2014. A further 210,000 fled from bordering states, bringing the total displaced by the conflict to 650,000. Many thousands left the country. An August 2014 Amnesty International video showed Army and allied militia executing people, including by slitting their throats, and dumping their corpses in mass graves. According to Human Rights Watch, more than 130 villages and towns were attacked or controlled by the group.

==== Kano shootings ====
On 8 February, at least nine polio vaccinators were killed in shootings at two clinics in Kano.

==== Baga massacre ====
On 16 and 17 April, a massacre of dozens of civilians as well as the destruction of hundreds of homes and businesses occurred in Baga, Borno, during a battle between Boko Haram and the Nigerian Army.

==== Konduga mosque shooting ====
On 11 August, Boko Haram killed 44 people in a mass shooting at a mosque in Konduga, Borno.

=== 2014 ===
==== January Maiduguri bombing ====
On 14 January, a car bombing in Maiduguri killed at least 17 people.

==== Boarding school massacre ====
On 25 February, Boko Haram killed at least 59 males at the Federal Government College in Buni Yadi, Yobe. The school was attended by children aged 11 to 18.

Some boys were burned alive in their dormitories while those who managed to escape the fire were shot or knifed to death. Some female students were abducted while others were threatened with death if they did not quit school and get married. All of the school's buildings were burned to the ground.

==== Chibok kidnapping ====
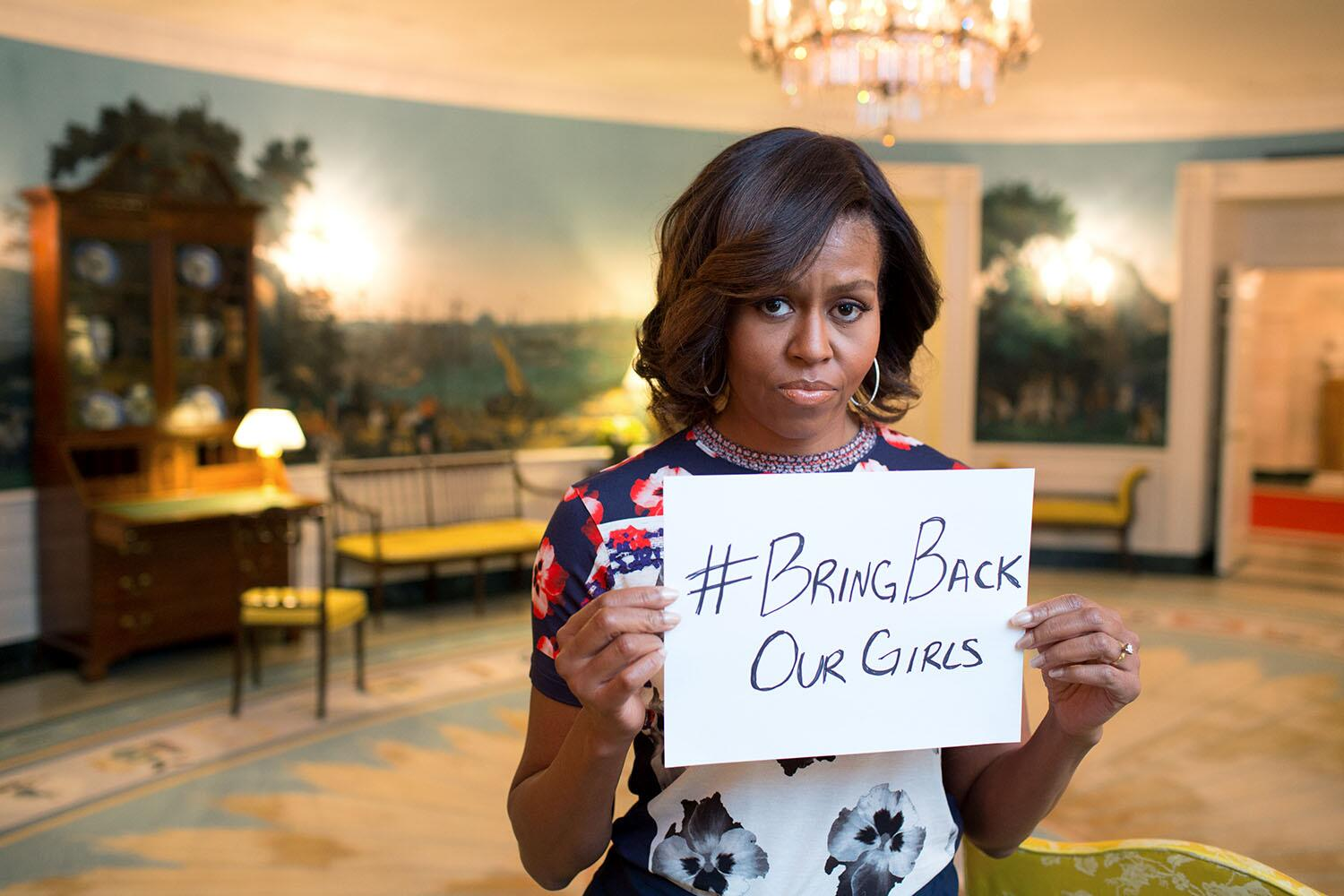
Michelle Obama raising public awareness of the Chibok kidnapping

On 14–15 April, Boko Haram kidnapped 276 schoolgirls from Chibok, Borno. Shekau announced his intention of selling them into slavery. More than 50 escaped. The incident brought Boko Haram extended global media attention, much of it focused on the pronouncements of the U.S. Former First Lady Michelle Obama. Faced with condemnation for his perceived incompetence, as well as allegations from Amnesty International of state collusion, President Jonathan responded by hiring a Washington PR firm.

Parents of the missing girls and those who had escaped were kept waiting until July to meet with the president, which caused them concern. In October, the government announced the girls' imminent release, but the information proved unreliable. The announcement to the media of a peace agreement and the imminent release of all the missing girls was followed days later by a video message in which Shekau stated that no such meeting had taken place and that the girls had been "married off". The announcement to the media, unaccompanied by any evidence of the reality of the agreement, was thought by analysts to have been a political ploy by the president to raise his popularity before his confirmation of his candidacy in the 2015 general election. Earlier in the year, the girls' plight had featured on "#BringBackOurGirls" political campaign posters in the streets of the capital, which the president denied knowledge of and soon took down after news of criticism surfaced. These posters, which were interpreted, to the dismay of campaigners for the girls' recapture, as being designed to benefit from the fame of the kidnapping, had also been part of Jonathan's "pre-presidential campaign". In September, "#BringBackGoodluck2015" campaign posters again drew criticism. The official announcement of the president's candidacy was made before cheering crowds in Abuja on 11 November.

In February 2016, the organisations International Alert and UNICEF published a study revealing that girls and women released from Boko Haram captivity often face rejection upon returning to their communities and families, in part due to a culture of stigma around sexual violence.

==== UN Sanctions ====
On 22 May 2014, Boko Haram was sanctioned by the UNSC's Al-Qaida Sanctions Committee.

==== EU Sanctions ====
The EU placed Boko Haram on its list of designated terrorist organization on 28/29 May 2014 through Decision 483/2014.

==== May Buni Yadi attack ====
On 27 May, soldiers, police and civilians were killed in Buni Yadi.

==== July Maiduguri bombing ====
On 1 July, a van bombing in Maiduguri killed at least 56 people.

==== Battle of Konduga ====
On 12 September, the Nigerian Armed Forces won a battle against Boko Haram.

==== Kano attack ====
On 28 November, over 120 Muslim worshippers were killed at the central mosque in Kano during Friday prayers.

==== Northern Cameroon ====
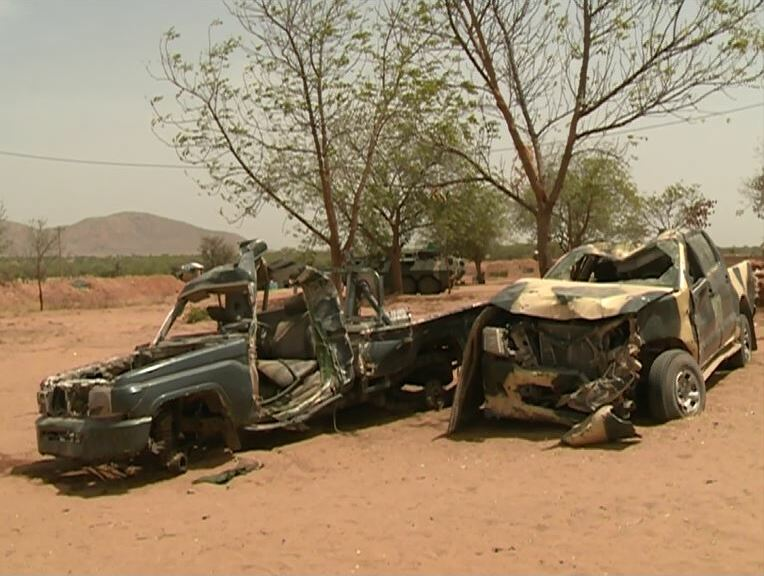
Vehicles used by Boko Haram destroyed in Northern Cameroon

Boko Haram continued to increase its presence in northern Cameroon. On 16 May, ten Chinese workers were abducted in a raid on a construction company camp in Waza, near the Nigerian border. Vehicles and explosives were also taken in the raid, and one Cameroonian soldier was killed. Cameroon's anti-terrorist Rapid Intervention Battalion attempted to intervene but were vastly outnumbered. In July, the deputy prime minister's home village was attacked by around 200 militants; his wife was kidnapped, along with the Sultan of Kolofata and his family. At least 15 people, including soldiers and police, were killed in the raid. The deputy prime minister's wife was subsequently released in October, along with 26 others including the ten Chinese construction workers who had been captured in May; authorities made no comment about any ransom, which the Cameroon government had previously claimed it never pays. In a separate attack, nine bus passengers and a soldier were shot dead and the son of a local chief was kidnapped. Hundreds of local youths are suspected to have been recruited. In August, the remote Nigerian border town of Gwoza was overrun and held by the group. In response to the increased militant activity, the Cameroonian president sacked two senior military officers and sent his army chief with 1000 reinforcements to the northern border region. Between May and July 2014, 8,000 Nigerian refugees arrived in the country, up to 25% suffering from acute malnutrition. Cameroon, which ranked 150 out of 186 on the 2012 UNDP HDI, hosted as of August 2014 107,000 refugees fleeing unrest in the CAR, a number that was expected to increase to 180,000 by the end of the year. A further 11,000 Nigerian refugees crossed the border into Cameroon and Chad during August.

In the second half of December, the focus of activity switched to the Far North Region of Cameroon, beginning on the morning of 17 December when an army convoy was attacked with an IED and ambushed by hundreds of militants near the border town of Amchide, 60 kilometres (40 mi) north of the state capital Maroua. One soldier was confirmed dead, and an estimated 116 militants were killed in the attack, which was followed by another attack overnight with unknown casualties. On 22 December, the Rapid Intervention Battalion followed up with an attack on a Boko Haram training camp near Guirdivig, arresting 45 militants and seizing 84 children aged 7–15 who were undergoing training, according to a statement from Cameroon's Ministry of Defense. The militants fled in pick-up trucks carrying an unknown number of their dead; no information on army casualties was released. On 27–28 December, five villages were simultaneously attacked, and for the first time the Cameroon military launched air attacks when Boko Haram briefly occupied an army camp. Casualty figures were not released. According to Information Minister Issa Tchiroma:

Units of the group attacked Makari, Amchide, Limani and Achigachia in a change of strategy which consists of distracting Cameroonian troops on different fronts, making them more vulnerable in the face of the mobility and unpredictability of their attacks.

==== Expansion of occupied territory ====
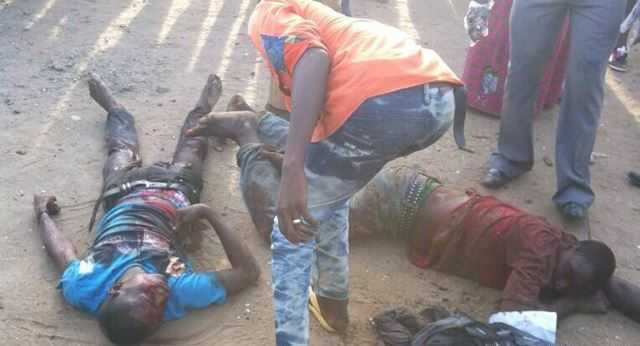
Wounded people following a bomb attack by Boko Haram in Nyanya, in April 2014

The attack on Gwoza signalled a change in strategy for Boko Haram, as the group continued to capture territory in north-eastern and eastern areas of Borno, as well as in Adamawa and Yobe. Attacks across the border were repelled by the Cameroon military. The territorial gains were officially denied by the Nigerian military. In a video obtained by the news agency AFP on 24 August, Shekau announced that Gwoza was now part of an Islamic caliphate. The town of Bama, 70 kilometres (45 mi) from the state capital Maiduguri, was reported to have been captured at the beginning of September, resulting in thousands of residents fleeing to Maiduguri, even as residents there were themselves attempting to flee. The military continued to deny Boko Haram's territorial gains, which were, however, confirmed by local vigilantes who had managed to escape. The militants were reportedly killing men and teenage boys in the town of over 250,000 inhabitants. Soldiers refused orders to advance on the occupied town; hundreds fled across the border into Cameroon, but were promptly repatriated. Fifty-four deserters were later sentenced to death by firing squad.

On 17 October, the Chief of the Defence Staff announced that a ceasefire had been brokered, stating: "I have accordingly directed the service chiefs to ensure immediate compliance with this development in the field". Despite a lack of confirmation from the militants, the announcement was publicised in newspaper headlines worldwide. However, within 48 hours the same publications were reporting that Boko Haram attacks had continued unabated. It was reported that factionalisation would make such a deal particularly difficult to achieve.

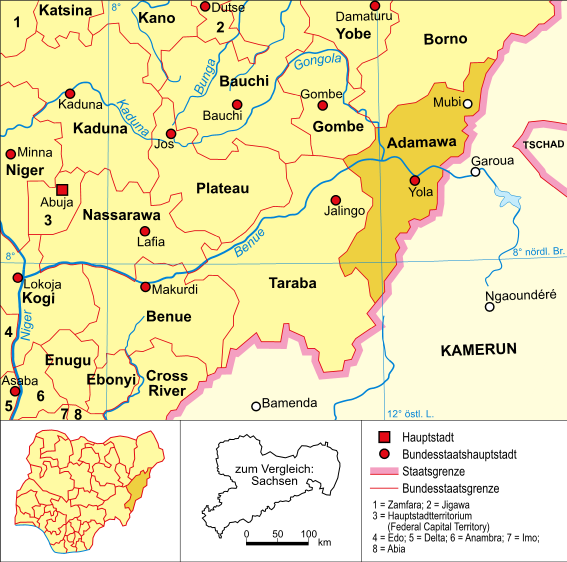
Location of the town of Mubi within Adamawa State

On 29 October, Mubi, a town of 200,000 in Adamawa, fell to the militants, further undermining confidence in the peace talks. Thousands fled south to Adamawa's capital city, Yola. Amid media speculation that the ceasefire announcement had been part of President Jonathan's re-election campaign, a video statement released by Boko Haram through the normal communication channels via AFP on 31 October stated that no negotiations had in fact taken place. Mubi was said to have been recaptured by the army on 13 November. On the same day, Boko Haram seized Chibok, but two days later the army recaptured the largely deserted town. As of 16 November it was estimated that more than twenty towns and villages had been taken control of by the militants. There were 27 Boko Haram attacks during the November, killing at least 786.

On 3 December, it was reported that several towns in North Adamawa had been recovered by the Nigerian military with the help of local vigilantes and Bala Nggilari, the governor of Adamawa state, said that the military were aiming to recruit 4,000 vigilantes. On 13 December, Boko Haram attacked the village of Gumsuri in Borno, killing over 30 and kidnapping over 100 women and children.

=== 2015 ===
==== Cameroon bus attack ====
On 1 January, Boko Haram killed at least 15 people on a bus in the Far North Region of Cameroon.

==== Baga massacre ====
On 3 January, Boko Haram attacked Baga, seizing it and the multinational joint task force military base. As the militants advanced the army fled. Some residents managed to escape to Chad. Although the death toll of the massacre was earlier estimated by Western media to be upwards of 2000, the Defence Ministry dismissed these claims as "speculation and conjecture", estimating the figure to be closer to 150. On 25 January, the militants advanced to Monguno, capturing the town and a nearby military base. Their advance on Maiduguri and Konduga, 40 km to the southeast, was repelled. After retaking Monguno, the army expelled the militants from Baga on 21 February.

The Baga massacre was one of the Nigerian Army's biggest defeats in terms of loss of equipment and civilian casualties. Several officers were court-martialed. In October, General Enitan Ransome-Kuti was dismissed from the army and sentenced to six months imprisonment. It was determined that he had failed in his duty to launch a counter-attack after retreating from the town.

==== West African offensive ====
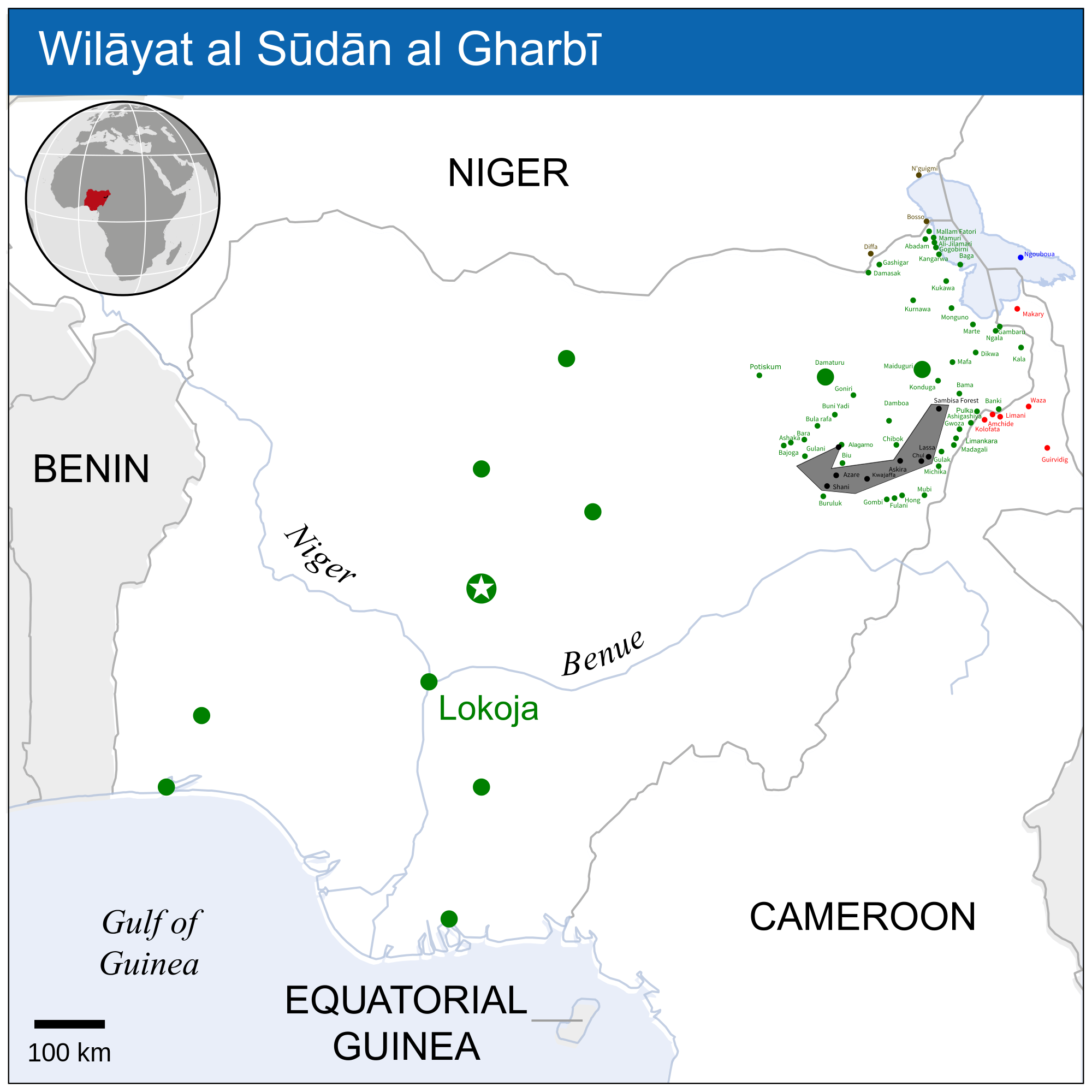
Map of Boko Haram's territorial control on 10 April 2015, over 2 months after the start of the 2015 West African offensive

Starting on 23 January, a coalition of military forces from Nigeria, Chad, Cameroon, and Niger began a campaign against Boko Haram. On 4 February, the Chadian Army killed over 200 Boko Haram militants. Soon afterwards, Boko Haram carried out a massacre in the town of Fotokol in Far North, Cameroon, killing 81 civilians, 13 Chadian soldiers and 6 Cameroonian soldiers. On 2 March, the Nigerian military defeated Boko Haram in the Battle of Konduga.

On 7 March, Boko Haram's leader Abubakar Shekau pledged allegiance to ISIL via an audio message posted on the organisation's Twitter account. Nigerian army spokesperson Sami Usman Kukasheka said the pledge was a sign of weakness and that Shekau was like a "drowning man". On 12 March 2015, ISIL's spokesman Abu Mohammad al-Adnani released an audiotape in which he welcomed the pledge of allegiance, and described it as an expansion of the group's caliphate to West Africa.

On 24 March, residents of Damasak, Borno State, said that Boko Haram had taken more than 400 women and children from the town as they fled from coalition forces who retook it and discovered a mass grave of Boko Haram victims. On 27 March, the Nigerian Army captured Gwoza, which was believed to be the location of Boko Haram headquarters. On election day 28 March 2015, Boko Haram extremists killed 41 people, including a legislator, to discourage hundreds from voting.

In March, Boko Haram lost control of the Northern Nigerian towns of Bama and Gwoza to the Nigerian army. The Nigerian authorities said that they had taken back 11 of the 14 districts previously controlled by Boko Haram. In April, four Boko Haram camps in the Sambisa Forest were overrun by the Nigerian military who freed nearly 300 females. Boko Haram forces were believed to have retreated to the Mandara Mountains, along the Nigeria-Cameroon border.

==== Damaturu, Potiskum and Kano bombings ====
In late February, suicide bombers killed about 50 people in Damaturu, Potiskum and Kano.

==== Attrition of Catholic diocese of Maiduguri ====
A report by the Catholic diocese of Maiduguri estimated that as of May 2015 over 5,000 Nigerian Catholics had been killed by Boko Haram. The diocese also reported 7,000 widows and 10,000 orphans among its laity. Furthermore, Boko Haram militants had taken over several parish centres within the diocese.

==== N'Djamena suicide bombings ====
On 15 June, two suicide bombings of police sites in N'Djamena, the capital and largest city of Chad, killed 38 people. Boko Haram later claimed responsibility for these attacks. On 27 June, suicide bombers killed six members of their own cell and five police officers during a police raid. On 11 July, a male suicide bomber disguised in a woman's burqa detonated his explosives belt in the main market of N'Djamena, next to the main mosque, killing 15 people and injuring 80. Several days after the bombing, Boko Haram claimed responsibility via Twitter, signing as "Islamic State, West Africa province".

==== Monguno bombing ====
A large sack containing homemade bombs exploded in Monguno, Borno State, Nigeria, killing at least 12 people, and possibly as many as 63. It happened at a camp which the Boko Haram had abandoned. They also carried out major attacks in Monguno in September 2015 and June 2020.

==== July mosques massacres ====
Boko Haram militants attacked multiple mosques on 1 and 2 July. Forty-eight men and boys were killed on the 1st at one mosque in Kukawa. Seventeen were wounded in the attack. Ninety-seven others, mostly men, were killed in numerous mosques on the 2nd with a number of women and young girls killed in their homes. An unknown number were wounded.

==== 5 July attacks ====
On 5 July, major attacks occurred in Potiskum, Jos and Borno State.

==== Fotokol bombings ====
On 12 July, two female suicide bombers wearing burqas killed 13 people in Fotokol. In response, the governor of Far North banned the garments to prevent further similar attacks.

==== Claims of defeat ====
The March 2015 general election was won by Buhari, who had vowed to remove inefficiency and corruption in the military. On 9 September 2015, the director of information at the Defence Headquarters, Colonel Rabe Abubakar announced that all known Boko Haram camps and cells had been destroyed, and that the group was so weakened that they could no longer hold any territory:

These terrorists have been subdued, even if they are adopting other means and as they are re-strategising, we are also doing the same and pre-empting them. We have coordinated the air and ground assaults to make sure that these terrorists' hideouts are completely decimated. As I am speaking to you, all the terrorists' camps have completely been wiped out. So right now they are completely in disarray, have no command and control of where to plan. We have even taken over their camps that most of them abandoned and are attempting to blend into towns and communities. We have also apprehended some of them and very soon innocent Nigerians can move back to their communities. We are making a lot of headway, so people should know that Boko Haram is no longer strong enough to hold grounds. Very soon this issue of whether they are in control of any territory in Nigeria or not will come to the open. I am assuring you that they will never again recapture the territory taken from them because what is happening right now with the deployment of troops, equipment and morale will ensure that.

Buhari later reiterated in December that Boko Haram was "technically defeated" and declared in December 2016 that the group had been entirely ousted from its last stronghold of Sambisa Forest.

==== Borno ====
On 20 September, a series of bombings occurred in Maiduguri and Monguno and the attacks followed an announcement by Shekau refuting the army's claims of defeat. A military spokesman stated that the event showed the "high level of desperation" of Boko Haram. The Arewa Consultative Forum released a statement condemning the bombings and commending the military offensive:

The ACF condemns in strong terms the continued use of suicide bombers by Boko Haram terrorists to kill innocent people in the name of a religious war, as no religion condones such cruel and barbaric act. The ACF wishes to commend the military and other security agencies for the continued onslaught on the terrorists' enclaves and hideouts, thereby dislodging them from their strong holds. The ACF urges the military not to be deterred by the cowardly act of the Boko Haram terrorists, as their renewed effort and determination will soon end the insurgency. The ACF also appeals to the military to intensify its synergy of sharing intelligence with the community.

On 21 October in Nganzai, Borno, according to a civilian vigilante, fleeing militants shot at four cars, killing the passengers, and burnt and looted the nearby village. On 23 October, a suicide bombing occurred in a pre dawn attack at a mosque in Maiduguri. The National Emergency Management Agency (NEMA) put the death toll at 6 while hospital sources reported 19 deaths and a vigilante claimed to have counted 28 corpses and two suicide bombers. On the following day, four female suicide bombers claimed one victim after they were intercepted by the JTF in Maiduguri, according to a NEMA spokesman.

On 27 October, a military operation freed 192 children and 138 women being held captive in two camps in the Sambisa forest and 30 militants were killed, according to a social media statement from the Defense HQ. None of the captives were those taken in Chibok in April 2014.

On 25 December, gunmen set fire to the village of Kimba, killing at least 14, according to vigilantes. On 27 December, gunmen armed with RPGs battled with troops for two hours in Aldawari village in the outskirts of Maiduguri, according to NEMA. On the following morning, a bombing at a nearby mosque killed around 20, according to NEMA.

==== Federal Capital Territory/Nasarawa ====
Two bombings on 2 October that killed 18 and wounded 41, one in Nyanya in Nasarawa and the other in Kuje, FCT were also claimed by Boko Haram.

==== Adamawa ====
On 1 October, villagers in Kirchinga, Adamawa complained of a lack of security personnel after 5 residents had their throats slit during an unchallenged early morning attack. The village borders Cameroon and the Sambisa forest. On 18 October the village of Dar, Adamawe was attacked. Maina Ularamu, a former chairman of Madagali Local Government Area, stated: "A large number of gunmen invaded the village, forcing residents to flee to a nearby bush. Two female suicide bombers disguised as fleeing villagers detonated explosives in the bush where many people were hiding, killing 12 persons". On 20 October, there were reports of a military ambush in Madagali, assisted by vigilantes, in which over 30 militants were killed. On 21 October, according to vigilante reports a joint operation in Madagali and Gwoza killed 150 militants and rescued 36 captives. On 23 October, a suicide bomb at a crowded mosque killed 27 in Yola, Adamawa's capital. On 17 November, an explosion at a food market in Yola killed 32, in the first Nigerian bombing since 23 October attacks in Maiduguri and Yola. On the morning of 28 December, two female suicide bombers detonated their explosives at a crowded market in Madagali. According to a local resident, at least 28 were killed.

==== Yobe ====
On 7 October in Damaturu, Yobe at least 15 people were killed by 3 suicide bombers. In Goniri, Yobe, seven soldiers and over 100 militants were killed, and a large arms cache was found, according to an army spokesman, who said that the recent apparent rise in suicide bombings was an indication of the success of military operations.

==== Kano ====
Boko Haram claimed responsibility for a suicide attack on a procession of Shi'ite Muslims killing at least 21, on 30 November, near the village of Dakozoye. A week earlier two bombers had killed at least 14 in Kano city.

==== Cameroon ====
On 12 January, Boko Haram attacked a Cameroonian military base in Kolofata, a commune in the Far North region. Government forces report killing 143 militants, while one Cameroonian soldier was killed. On 18 January, Boko Haram raided two Tourou Cameroon area villages, torching houses, killing some residents and kidnapping between 60 and 80 people including an estimated 50 young children between the ages of 10 and 15.

On 11 October, in the far north region of Cameroon two female suicide bombers killed nine people in the town of Mora. On 18 October 10 militants were killed when they attacked a Cameroon military anti-terrorist division convoy close to the border, after a military vehicle became stuck in mud. One army commander later died of his wounds. On 12 October, the first 90 of a proposed deployment of 300 US troops arrived in the region to assist with training, reconnaissance and airborne intelligence using Predator drones. On 16 October, more than six security vehicles were transferred to the Cameroon military. An AFRICOM spokesman said that increased cooperation had led them "to study the viability of ISR flights from a temporary location in Cameroon". The deployment is "totally separate and distinct" from operations in Chad and Niger, where 250 and 85 personnel, respectively, are conducting missions including ISR and training.

On 23 October, Boko Haram fighters were driven out of Kerawa, a village of 50,000 in Kolofata. They had briefly occupied the village until the arrival of security forces. Reports of civilian casualties ranged from eight to eleven. An army spokesman claimed the militants suffered heavy casualties. The village's military base had previously been targeted by suicide bombers on 3 September, when 30 were killed.

On 9 November, two female suicide bombers killed three Nigerians during a security check in a truck full of Nigerian refugees. On 21 November, a suicide attack in a suburb of Fotokol town killed four. An anonymous military official said: "The first kamikaze detonated his bomb in the house of the traditional chief of Leymarie. Five people died including the bomber. Several minutes later, three female bombers exploded their bombs close to the initial site but they didn't kill anyone else because they acted too quickly".

On 28 November, two suicide bombers killed six near the military base in Dabanga, and in an attack in Gouzoudou five people were killed, according to a military spokesman. On 1 December, two suicide bombers killed three, and a third bomber was killed before detonating explosives. On 2 December, Cameroon's Defense Minister claimed that, at the end of November, 100 Boko Haram members had been killed and 900 hostages freed, and that a large stockpile of arms and munitions, and black-and-white ISIL flags had been seized. Information Minister Issa Tchiroma Bakari said that "[t]he people that were freed are just villagers. The [Chibok] schoolgirls who are missing are not amongst the group".

==== Chad - October and November ====
On 6 October, the Chadian Army reported an attack in the border region of Lake Chad. 11 soldiers were killed and 14 wounded in the pre-dawn cross-border infiltration, and 17 militants were also killed, according to an army spokesman. On 10 October 5 suicide bombers killed 33 people in the market in Baga Sola, a camp for Nigerian refugees. On 1 November, two dawn attacks on army posts occurred. Eleven militants and two soldiers were killed at Kaika, and in an attempted suicide bombing at Bougouma, "Two members of Boko Haram were neutralised and a third blew himself up, wounding 11 civilians", according to a government statement. A state of emergency was imposed in the western Lake Chad region on 9 November, initially for 12 days, but extended by Chad's national assembly on 18 November to four months.

==== December Chad bombings ====
On 5 December, three female suicide bombers killed about 30 at a crowded market on the island of Koulfoua in Lake Chad.

==== Niger ====
On 6 February, Boko Haram assaulted Bosso and Diffa. On 25 September, at least 15 civilians were massacred and stores were looted in a cross-border raid on a Niger village, according to anonymous military sources. On 2 October two soldiers died and four were wounded in a Boko Haram attack on a village near the Nigerian border in Niger's Diffa province. The militants also looted stores, according to Niger army officers. On 4 October, according to an aid worker, a policeman and five civilians were killed by 4 suicide bombers near the Nigerian border. On 6 October, three suspected Boko Haram militants accidentally blew themselves up while transporting explosives to Bosso town in Diffa. On 21 October, near Diffa town, two soldiers were killed by explosives while intercepting an attack. Diffa region hosts over 150,000 Nigerian refugees. It is under a state of emergency. On 14 October a curfew and movement restrictions were imposed. At least 57 attacks occurred there from February to October. More than 1,100 Boko Haram suspects were arrested in Niger during 2015.

On 11 November, two Niger military officials described an attack on a village in Bosso district in which five civilians and 20 militants were killed. A senior government official later denied that the attack had occurred, according to Reuters. On 26 November, Boko Haram launched a cross-border night raid on Wogom village in Diffa province. A government spokesman, Justice Minister Marou Amadou stated: "Eighteen villagers were killed, including the chief imam for the village whose throat was slit by his own nephew". On 13 March 2018, the United Nations Special Rapporteur on the human rights of internally displaced persons (IDP), Cecilia Jimenez-Damary said "Since the first attacks in Niger by Boko Haram in 2015, the Diffa region, in the south-eastern part of the country, has been confronted with a continuing security crisis which has uprooted more than 129,000 internally from their homes, in addition to the arrival of 108,000 refugees from Nigeria, and has triggered a humanitarian crisis. He said that IDPs in Niger are posing huge challenges to the country and require a strong and comprehensive response. He also said situation in the regions bordering Mali has led to the displacement of some 1,540 persons.

=== 2016 ===
==== Bodo bombings ====
On 25 January, over 30 people were killed by four Boko Haram suicide bombers in Bodo, Far North Region, Cameroon.

==== Dalori attack ====
On 30 January, at least 86 people were killed and at least 62 more injured in an attack by Boko Haram militants on Dalori Village which is located in Borno State, 4 kilometers from Maiduguri. The Nigerian Army was unable to fight the militants until reinforcements arrived, causing Boko Haram to retreat.

==== Dikwa suicide bombings ====
On 9 February, two young Boko Haram female suicide bombers killed at least 60 people at an internally displaced persons camp in Dikwa, Borno.

==== Maiduguri bombings ====
On 16 March, two female suicide bombers killed 22 people in Maiduguri. On 29 October, two female suicide bombers killed seven people in the same city.

==== Weakening and split ====
Johns Hopkins University figures indicated that Boko Haram killed 244 people in the second quarter – the lowest quarterly figure for five years.

In early August, ISIL announced that it had appointed Abu-Musab al-Barnawi as the new leader of the group. In a video released a few days later, Shekau refused to accept al-Barnawi's appointment as leader and vowed to fight him while stating that he was still loyal to ISIL's leader Abu Bakr al-Baghdadi.

The group has since split into pro-Barnawi and pro-Shekau factions, with reports of armed clashes breaking out between them. Shekau has released videos since the split in which he refers to his group by its previous name of Jamā'at Ahl as-Sunnah lid-Da'wah wa'l-Jihād.

On 23 August, the Nigerian Army announced it conducted an overnight air-operation that was 'very successful' in killing the leadership of Boko Haram. Among those presumed killed was Abubakar Shekau, he died in an aerial bombardment in Taye village. The Nigerian Army claims that the disputed Boko Haram leader died from injuries to his shoulders while he was performing prayer.

On 28 August, the Nigerian president Muhammadu Buhari, retracted the military's statement and claimed that the Boko Haram leader was 'wounded' but not killed in the air-strike.

On 31 August, Major General Lucky Irabor stated that the militants now only controlled a few villages and towns near Lake Chad and in Sambisa Forest. He further stated that the military expected recapturing the final strongholds of the group within weeks.

==== Madagali suicide bombings ====
On 9 December, two female Boko Haram suicide bombers killed at least 57 people in Madagali, Adamawa.

=== 2017 ===
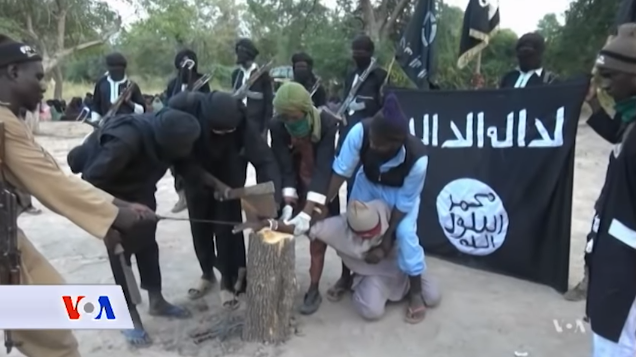
Boko Haram terrorists cutting the hand of a man in 2017

==== Rann bombing ====
On 17 January, the Nigerian Air Force carried out an airstrike on an IDP camp in Rann, Borno. They had mistaken it for a Boko Haram camp; the bombing killed dozens of civilians.

==== Increase in the number of child suicide bombings ====
UNICEF reported an increase in the number of child suicide bombers with 27 incidents occurring in the first three months of 2017 in Nigeria, Niger, Cameroon and Chad, compared to 30 in the entire previous year, 56 in 2015 and 4 in 2014. Kidnapped children who escape from Boko Haram are often held in custody or ostracised by their communities or families. Patrick Rose, a UNICEF regional coordinator, stated: "They are held in military barracks, separated from their parents, without medical follow-up, without psychological support, without education, under conditions and for durations that are unknown". According to the NGO: "Society's rejection of these children, and their sense of isolation and desperation, could be making them more vulnerable to promises of martyrdom through acceptance of dangerous and deadly missions". In addition to child suicide bombers and despite having been routed from key areas and significantly downgraded in their capacities, throughout 2016 and into 2017, Boko Haram in Nigeria continued to wage attacks against Nigerian security forces, the community-based Civilian Joint Task Forces (CJTF), and regular citizens, using improvised explosives devices (IEDs) and other crude weaponry. These were often deployed with suicide bombers; an increasing number of whom were women and girls recruited to attack markets, transportation depots, mosques, and IDP camps.

==== Maidiguri bombings ====
On 22 March, suicide bombers attacked an IDP camp in Maidiguri, killing four people and wounding 18 others.

==== Mubi bombing ====
On 21 November, a suicide bomber killed 50 people inside a mosque in Mubi.

==== Diffa clash ====
On 6 December, Boko Haram attacked Nigerian and American soldiers in Diffa Region, Niger.

=== 2018 ===
==== Dapchi kidnapping ====
Boko Haram kidnapped 110 schoolgirls from the Government Technical Girls College in Dapchi, Yobe State, on 19 February 2018, killing five of them on the same day. They released all but one of the surviving girls on 21 March, having been paid a large ransom by the Nigerian government to do so.

==== Maiduguri attack ====
On 2 April, a Boko Haram attack on the outskirts of Maiduguri resulted in the death of 18 people and another 84 wounded. This attack came just days after the government of Nigeria claimed there was a ceasefire with Boko Haram. The attack happened in the villages of Bale Shuwa and Bale Kura, close to both Maiduguri and the city's military camp.

==== Operation Lafiya Dole ====
On 18 May, the Nigerian Army killed 15 Boko Haram insurgents and rescued 49 persons in separate encounters between Boko Haram and Nigerian troops throughout the Southern Lake Chad Basin. The Nigerian troops killed 11 of the insurgents during a battle in Gamoran Village, while the remaining insurgents were killed trying to escape from the Army's efforts in Northern Borno. The Nigerian troops rescued 4 men, 33 women, and 16 children from the insurgent's hideouts in the area.

==== Attacks in north-east Nigeria ====
In December, Boko Haram launched a series of attacks in north-east Nigeria. Militants from Islamic State West Africa Province took over the town of Baga and seized the Multinational Joint Task Force base. The attacks took place two months prior to the presidential elections in Nigeria.

=== 2019 ===
==== Attack near Nigerian Army chief of staff's family home ====
On 17 January 6 Nigerian soldiers were killed and 14 injured by the Boko Haram jihadists during a raid at a village near the army chief's family home. Four military vehicles were also seized by the jihadists and two were completely destroyed.

Maiduguri suicide bombing

On 16 February, Boko Haram carried out a suicide bombing in the Gwozari/Kushari district of Maiduguri resulting in 11 deaths.

==== Attack against Chadian security forces ====
On 22 March, Boko Haram militants killed at least 23 Chadian soldiers overnight, two Chadian security sources said on that day, in what appeared to be the deadliest ever such attack inside Chad by the Islamist militants. The raid occurred in the town of Dangdala, near the banks of Lake Chad. One of security sources added that the assailants were believed to have crossed the border from neighbouring Niger.

==== Konduga bombings ====
On 16 June, a triple suicide bombing occurred outside a television-viewing hall in Konduga, Borno.

==== Nganzai funeral attack ====
On 27 July, civilians were massacred as they returned from a funeral in Nganzai, Borno.

==== Attack against a Nigerian military base ====
On 15 August, Nigerian soldiers were killed during a gun battle with Islamist militants in a village on the outskirts of Borno capital Maiduguri.

==== Attack against a Burkina Faso military base ====
On 20 September, Boko Haram said that its fighters carried out an August attack in Koutougou in northern Burkina Faso that killed 24 soldiers.

=== 2020 ===
==== Gamboru bombing ====
On 6 January, a bombing occurred at a market on a bridge in Gamboru, Borno.

==== Auno attack ====
On 9 February, a massacre occurred on the A3 road in Auno, Borno.

==== Boma attack ====
On 23 March, Boko Haram fighters attacked soldiers in Boma, Chad, killing 92 and destroying 24 army vehicles. It marked the deadliest ever attack by Boko Haram on the country's military forces, and a serious escalation of conflict. In its eight-day counter-operation "Operation Bohoma Anger", Chadian army claims to have killed around one thousand Boko Haram fighters while incurring 52 casualties of its own troops. Of 58 suspected Boko Haram members, who had been captured during the operation, 44 died in a prison in N'Djamena mid-April 2020. The Minister of Justice Djimet Arabi stated that the men died as a result of poisoning.

==== Goneri ambush ====
On 23 March, at least 50 Nigerian soldiers were killed in an ambush by Boko Haram fighters near Goneri village in Borno. The army stated that all Boko Haram fighters were killed, although the number was not stated.

==== Amchide bombing ====
On 5 April, two Boko Haram suicide bombers killed seven civilians and themselves in Amchide, Far North Region, Cameroon.

==== Gajigana attack ====
On 18 May, Just as people were preparing to break their Ramadan fast after sundown, the sect attacked the Nigerian village of Gajigana, Borno, 29 miles north of the state capital Maiduguri, killing at least 20 people and injuring 25 others. Their rebellion has now claimed more than 20,000 lives and left more than 7 million people in need of humanitarian assistance.

==== Gubio massacre ====
On 9 June, ISWAP killed 81 villagers in Gubio, Borno.

==== Monguno and Nganzai massacres ====
On 13 June in Borno, ISWAP killed at least 20 soldiers in Monguno and more than 40 civilians in Nganzai.

==== Nguetchewe attack ====
On 2 August, Boko Haram killed at least 18 people in a grenade attack at an IDP camp.

==== Koshebe massacre ====
On 28 November, Boko Haram killed about 110 farmers in Koshebe, Borno.

==== Kankara kidnapping ====
On 11 December, more than 330 students were abducted from the Government Science Secondary School in Kankara, Katsina State, after gunmen with assault rifles attacked their school. Boko Haram later claimed responsibility for this.

==== Christmas Eve attack in Pemi ====
On 24 December, Boko Haram killed at least 11 people, burnt a church and kidnapped a priest in the predominantly Christian village of Pemi in Borno. On 26 December, Turkey condemned the terrorist attack, describing it as "heinous". The Turkish ministry extended its sincere condolences to the families of those who died.

==== Wulgo forest kidnapping ====
On 24 December 40 loggers were seized by Boko Haram jihadists, while 3 others were killed in the Wulgo forest near the town of Gamboru in Borno. Bodies of three loggers were found in the forest by a militia leader, and the rest were presumed kidnapped.

=== 2021 ===
==== Maiduguri attacks ====
On 23 February, Boko Haram killed 10 people in Maiduguri using rocket-propelled grenades.

==== Battle of Sambisa Forest ====
On 20 May, Nigerian intelligence officials said that Boko Haram leader Abubakar Shekau died after he detonated a suicide vest in order to avoid being captured during a battle with rival Islamist militants aligned with ISIS. Internal intelligence memos backing this claim were afterwards shown to the Wall Street Journal. Five Nigerian officials, mediators, as well as phone calls intercepted by a West African spy agency backed the report of Shekau's death. After Shekau's death, Boko Haram initially fell under the command of his designated successor, a cleric named Sahalaba. However, a loyal commander named Bakura Doro gradually gained more power and influence within the group. Bakura also succeeded in rallying the remnants of Boko Haram as well as stemming IS advances.

=== 2022 ===
In March, Bakura overthrew and murdered Sahalaba, taking control of Boko Haram. In the same month, Catholic Church sources in Cameroon, near the border with Nigeria, claimed that they had been attacked regularly by Boko Haram militants since September 2021. In one attack "they managed to reach Oupaï by coming through Douval. They killed two people, burned the houses and carried off clothing and small animals. Since mid-February four of the seven areas of the parish have been paralysed. We thought they wouldn't be able to reach Oupaï because it is right on top of a mountain, but we were wrong!" According to an anonymous priest, the attacks seemed to be mostly focused on obtaining supplies. "In the past they entered villages, ostentatiously yelling war cries, but recently they have come discretely, taking advantage of the full moon, to surprise people in their sleep. They kill the fathers of the family and the teenagers, especially the boys. Then they pillage the family's property and destroy everything they can't carry off."

On 11 August five soldiers were killed during a terrorist attack in Bwari, Abuja. The soldiers were serving with the 7 Guards Battalion, Lungi Barracks, Maitama and 176 Guards Battalion, Gwagwalada in the Federal Capital Territory, Abuja Organisation.

=== 2023 ===
==== Yobe State attacks ====
In October 2023, Boko Haram lead one of its most horrific attacks in recent years.The terrorist group killed 20 mourners returning from a burial of victims of an earlier attack in north-eastern Nigeria, according to police. The earlier attack happened in Gurokayeya and claimed the lives of 17 individuals. According to the local police, villagers were killed after refusing to pay the illegal "harvest tax" demanded by the terrorists.

==== Regrouping and victories over ISWAP around Lake Chad ====
Over the course of 2023, Boko Haram managed to regain considerable strength under Bakura's leadership. The group managed to expand its holdings and defeated ISWAP in a series of costly battles, taking control of many islands and shore areas of Lake Chad.

=== 2024 ===
On 21 June, a woman detonated an IED in a suicide bombing in Konduga killing at least 12.

On 29 June, at least 32 people were killed in attacks in the northeastern Nigerian city of Gwoza.

=== 2025 ===
On 5 September, more than 60 people were killed in attacks by Boko Haram in Darul Jamal, Borno State, Nigeria.

In October 2025, Boko Haram seized the Nigerian border town of Kirawa in Borno State, burning the district head's palace, a military barracks, and dozens of homes, forcing more than 5,000 people to flee to neighbouring Cameroon.

Between 5 and 8 November 2025 occurred the Battle of Lake Chad between Boko Haram and ISWAP.

=== 2026 ===
Reuters reported that on 26 January 2026 suspected Boko Haram militants encountered Nigerian soldiers and killed 7 and captured 13 including a major. 11 soldiers escaped and made it to safety, this coming after the military started a deep offensive against Boko Haram in the North East this year. The attack occurred in the Damasak area of Borno.

== Organisation ==
=== Leader ===
Boko Haram was founded by Mohammed Yusuf who led the group from 2002 until his death in 2009. After his death, his deputy, Abubakar Shekau took control of the group and led it until his suicide at the culmination of the Battle of Sambisa Forest in 2021. Their new leader is Bakura Doro.

Although Boko Haram is organised in a hierarchical structure with one overall leader, the group also operates as a clandestine cell system using a network structure, with units having between 300 and 500 fighters each. Estimates of the total number of fighters range between 500 and 9,000.

A notable faction which arose from Boko Haram is the Sadiku faction, also known as Boko Haram's Shiroro cell, a semi-independent faction which is more tolerant of other groups, such as local bandits and the Christian-majority Gbagyi people in exchange for their loyalty and alliance, although they target those who reject its version of Sharia law such as when they conducted the 2026 Kwara State attacks.

=== Financing ===
==== Kidnapping for ransom ====
Boko Haram is said to have raised substantial sums of money by kidnapping people for ransom. In 2013, Boko Haram kidnapped a family of seven French tourists while they were on vacation in Cameroon and two months later, Boko Haram released the hostages along with 16 others in exchange for a ransom of US$3.15 million.

==== Extortion ====
In addition to extortion from local residents, Boko Haram has claimed to extort money from local state governments. A spokesman of Boko Haram claimed that Kano State governor Ibrahim Shekarau and Bauchi State governor Isa Yuguda had paid them monthly.

=== Relationship with other militant groups ===
It has long been alleged that Boko Haram had a relationship with al-Qaeda. In 2011, letters from Boko Haram were reportedly found in Osama bin Laden's compound.

Three weeks after the 2009 Boko Haram uprising began, al-Qaeda in the Islamic Maghreb expressed sympathy for Boko Haram. Speaking by phone to reporters in November 2012, group spokesman Abu Qaqa said: "We are together with al-Qaeda, they are promoting the cause of Islam, just as we are doing. Therefore they help us in our struggle and we help them, too." The 2012 Reuters special report details how fighters have trained with al-Qaeda affiliates in small groups over at least 6 years.

According to the UN Security Council listing of Boko Haram under the al-Qaeda sanctions regime in May 2014, the group "has maintained a relationship with AQIM for training and material support purposes", and "gained valuable knowledge on the construction of improvised explosive devices from AQIM". The UN found that a "number of Boko Haram members fought alongside al Qaeda affiliated groups in Mali in 2012 and 2013 before returning to Nigeria with terrorist expertise". AQIM is one of al-Qaeda's regional branches, whose leader, Abu Musab Abdel Wadoud, has sworn an oath of allegiance to al-Qaeda's senior leadership.

Despite its historic ties with Boko Haram, al-Qaeda central has never officially accepted Boko Haram as an affiliate. The issues which divide AQ and Boko Haram are related to the extremism of Abubakar Shekau with respect to his declaration that the entire Muslim population of Nigeria is non-Muslim. Shekau argued that it was legitimate to kill Muslim civilians based on his belief that apostasy was widespread among the general population of Nigerian Muslims because they voted in elections. Al-Qaeda believes that the general Muslim population of Nigeria should be considered Muslim and based on al-Qaeda's point of view, the killing of civilians is unacceptable.

Boko Haram has engaged in battle with IS W Africa.

== Response of Nigerian authorities ==
Until the 1990s, the Nigerian military was seen as a force for stability across the region. But by 2014, it was short of basic equipment, including radios and armoured vehicles. Morale was said to be low. Senior officers were allegedly skimming military procurement and budget funds which were intended to pay for the standard issue equipment which is supposed to be provided to soldiers. The country's defense budget accounted for more than a third of the country's security budget of $5.8 billion, but only 10% of this money was allocated to cover capital spending. A 2016 United States Department of Defense assessment stated that the Nigerian administration's response to the Boko Haram crisis was marred by "high-level corruption" but that the morale in the military had improved after several former senior government officials were arrested on corruption charges.

In the summer of 2013, the Nigerian military shut down mobile phone coverage in three north-eastern Nigerian states in order to disrupt Boko Haram's communication and ability to detonate IEDs. Accounts by military insiders and data of Boko Haram incidents before, during, and after the mobile phone blackout all suggest that the shut down was 'successful' from a military-tactical point of view. However, it angered citizens who lived in the region (owing to the negative social and economic consequences of the mobile shutdown) and engendered negative opinions of the state and its new emergency policies. While citizens and organisations developed various coping and circumventing strategies, Boko Haram evolved from an open network model of insurgency to a closed centralised system, shifting the centre of its operations to the Sambisa Forest. As a consequence, Boko Haram's changing strategies fundamentally changed the dynamics of the conflict.

In July 2014, Nigeria was estimated to have suffered the highest number of terrorist killings in the world over the past year, 3477, killed in 146 attacks. The governor of Borno, Kashim Shettima, of the opposition ANPP, said in February 2014:

Boko Haram are better armed and are better motivated than our own troops. Given the present state of affairs, it is absolutely impossible for us to defeat Boko Haram.

In April 2018, the President of Nigeria, Muhammadu Buhari, approved a release of $1bn for the procurement of security equipment to fight insurgency and revolt in the country. This announcement came days after an attack by Boko Haram that left 18 dead in northern Nigeria.

In September 2021, Brigadier General Bernard Onyeuko of the Nigerian Armed Forces announced the surrender of close to 6,000 Boko Haram insurgents.

On 15 February 2024, the Borno Government says it had cleared 500 suspects of involvement in terrorism and had them released from the Nigerian Army detention facility at Giwa Barracks, Maiduguri.

On 12 April 2026, the Nigerian Air Force launched an airstrike targeting suspected Jihadi rebels. The airstrike hit the Jilli weekly market located in a village in Yobe State near the Borno State border. Amnesty International had reported the strike killed at least 100 people with children among the casualties. Some Nigerian officials described the strike as a misfire while the Nigerian Military declared a successful strike on a "terrorist enclave and logistics hub". The market is known to be frequented by Boko Haram Jihadis but it is unknown how many of the casualties were confirmed Boko Haram Jihadists. Following the strike, the Associated Press reported that at least 500 civilians have been killed in similar misfires.

== International responses ==
=== Dates of designation as a terrorist organisation ===
| Country/Organisation | Date |
|---|---|
| Australia | 26 June 2014 |
| Bahrain | |
| Canada | 24 December 2013 |
| China | 8 May 2014 |
| Iraq | |
| Malaysia | 2014 |
| New Zealand | March 2014 |
| United Arab Emirates | 15 November 2014 |
| United Kingdom | 10 July 2013 |
| United Nations | 22 May 2014 |
| United States | 14 November 2013 |
| European Union | 28/29 May 2014 |

=== African Coalition force ===
After a series of meetings over many months, Cameroon's foreign minister announced on 30 November 2014 that a coalition force to fight terrorism, including Boko Haram, would soon be operational. The force would include 3,500 soldiers from Benin, Chad, Cameroon, Niger and Nigeria. Discussions between the Economic Community of West African States (ECOWAS) about a broader based military force were held in January 2015.

In early February 2015, an agreement to provide 7,500 African Union troops from Benin, Cameroon, Chad, and Niger was tentatively reached. On 2 February 2015, the Nigerian Army said it had recaptured Gamboru from Boko Haram, along with the nearby towns of Mafa, Mallam Fatori, Abadam, and Marte following a joint weekend offensive by Nigerian, Chadian and Cameroonian forces. By 6 February 2015, Chadian and Nigerian warplanes and ground troops had forced Boko Haram forces to abandon about a dozen towns and villages. On 17 February 2015, the Nigerian military retook Monguno in a coordinated air and ground assault. On 6 March 2015, the African Union endorsed the creation of a regional force of more than 8,000 troops to combat Boko Haram.

=== Chinese assistance ===
In May 2014, China offered Nigeria assistance that included satellite data, and possibly military equipment.

=== Colombian assistance ===
In October 2015, Colombia sent a delegation of security experts to assist the Nigerian authorities and share expertise on security and counter terrorism. In January 2016, a delegation led by Lieutenant General Tukur Yusuf Buratai also visited Colombia to exchange information in regards to the war against Boko Haram.

=== South African and post-Soviet states assistance ===
In March 2015, it was reported that Nigeria had employed hundreds of mercenaries from South Africa and the former Soviet Union to assist it in its effort to make gains against Boko Haram before the 28 March election.

=== French and British assistance ===
France and the United Kingdom, in coordination with the United States, have sent trainers and material assistance to Nigeria to assist in the fight against Boko Haram. France planned to use 3,000 troops in the region for counter-terrorism operations. Israel and Canada also pledged support.

In 2017, the United Kingdom enforced an emergency assistance package worth $259 million. The United Kingdom has also aided Nigeria through military support and counter-terrorism training. The British government has provided training to 28,000 Nigerian military troops to aid the fight against Boko Haram. More than 40 British soldiers have also been sent on a long-term deployment to Nigeria.

On 28 August 2018, the British government produced a press release describing the details of the newly launched partnership between the United Kingdom and Nigeria which was formed in an attempt to reduce the threat posed by Boko Haram to the citizens of both nations. The press release gave insight into the multiple methods (including community engagement and direct intervention by the Nigerian government) of preventing and reducing the impacts of attacks carried out by Boko Haram in Nigeria.

Specific details of the cooperation between the British and Nigerian governments include:

A £13 million programme to educate 100,000 children living in the conflict zone and; implementing a Nigerian crisis response mechanism to help the government respond to incidents like terror attacks and; cutting the number of new recruits joining Boko Haram by tackling the false information spread by the group to recruit new members.

=== United States responses ===
In 2012, the U.S. Department of State had an internal debate on whether to place Boko Haram on its list of FTOs (Foreign Terrorist Organizations). The Bureau of Counterterrorism leaned towards designation while the Bureau of African Affairs urged caution. Officials from the Justice Department, the FBI, the CIA, and a number of members of Congress urged the State Department to designate Boko Haram as an FTO. The Nigerian government voiced its opposition to an FTO designation, citing concerns that it would raise Boko Haram's stature and have implications for humanitarian aid in the region where Boko Haram operated. Twenty academic experts on Nigeria signed a letter to the State Department urging it not to designate Boko Haram as an FTO, saying that it would hinder NGO efforts in the region and might legitimise the Nigerian Army's human rights abuses in its efforts to fight Boko Haram.

The U.S. State Department designated Boko Haram and its offshoot Ansaru as terrorist organisations in November 2013, citing Boko Haram's links with AQIM and its responsibility for "thousands of deaths in northeast and central Nigeria over the last several years including targeted killings of civilians". The State Department also cited Ansaru's 2013 kidnapping and execution of seven international construction workers. In the statement it was noted, however, "These designations are an important and appropriate step, but only one tool in what must be a comprehensive approach by the Nigerian government to counter these groups through a combination of law enforcement, political, and development efforts." The State Department had resisted earlier calls to designate Boko Haram as a terrorist group after the 2011 Abuja United Nations bombing. The U.S. government does not believe Boko Haram is currently (2014) affiliated with al Qaeda Central, despite periodic pledges of support and solidarity from its leadership for al-Qaeda, but is particularly concerned about ties between Boko Haram and Al Qaeda in the Islamic Maghreb (AQIM) (including "likely sharing funds, training, and explosive materials").

Efforts to cooperate in freeing the Chibok schoolgirls had faltered, largely due to mutual distrust; the infiltration of the military by Boko Haram meant that U.S. officials were wary of sharing raw intelligence data, and the Nigerian military had failed to supply information that might have aided U.S. drone flights in locating the kidnapped girls. The Nigerian government claims that Boko Haram is "the West Africa branch of the world-wide Al-Qaeda movement" with connections to al-Shabaab in Somalia and AQIM in Mali. The Nigerian government denies having committed human rights abuses in the conflict, and therefore oppose U.S. restrictions on arms sales, which they see as being based on the U.S. mis-application of the Leahy Law due to concerns over human rights in Nigeria. The U.S. had supplied the Nigerian army with trucks and equipment but had blocked the sale of Cobra helicopters. In November 2014 the U.S. State department again refused to supply Cobras, citing concerns over the Nigerian military's ability to maintain and use them without endangering civilians.

On 1 December 2014, the U.S. embassy in Abuja announced that the U.S. had discontinued training a Nigerian battalion at the request of the Nigerian government. A spokesman for the U.S. state department said: "We regret premature termination of this training, as it was to be the first in a larger planned project that would have trained additional units with the goal of helping the Nigerian Army build capacity to counter Boko Haram. The U.S. government will continue other aspects of the extensive bilateral security relationship, as well as all other assistance programs, with Nigeria. The U.S. government is committed to the long tradition of partnership with Nigeria and will continue to engage future requests for cooperation and training".

On 24 September 2015, the White House announced a military aid package for African allies fighting Boko Haram. The package included up to $45 million for training and other support for Benin, Cameroon, Chad, Niger and Nigeria. On 14 October 2015, the White House released a statement, in accordance with the War Powers Resolution, announcing the deployment of 300 troops to Cameroon to conduct airborne ISR: "These forces are equipped with weapons for the purpose of providing their own force protection and security, and they will remain in Cameroon until their support is no longer needed."

In October 2015, General David M. Rodriguez, the head of the United States Africa Command, reported that Boko Haram has lost territory, directly contradicting statements which were made by Boko Haram. U.S. efforts to train and share intelligence with regional military forces is credited with helping to push back against Boko Haram, but officials warn that the group remains a grave threat.

=== United Nations responses ===
In January 2019, when thousands of refugees from northeastern Nigeria were forced to return from Cameroon, despite the continuous threat to civilian lives by Boko Haram jihadists, the United Nations was "extremely alarmed". "This action was totally unexpected and puts lives of thousands of refugees at risk," the United Nations High Commissioner for Refugees, Filippo Grandi said. The UNHCR appealed to Cameroon "to continue its open door and hospitable policy" and stop any more returns. In March 2021, the UN announced it was launching a $1 billion appeal in Abuja, with the goal of providing assistance to an estimated nine million northern Nigerians in need of humanitarian aid because of Boko Haram's 11-year insurgency.

== See also ==
- Human rights in Nigeria
- Islam and violence
- Islam in Africa
- Islam in Nigeria
- Islamic extremism in Northern Nigeria
- Islamic fundamentalism
- Islamic terrorism
- Islamism
- Jihadism
- Kabiru Sokoto
- Nigerian Mobile Police
- Religion in Nigeria
- Salafi jihadism
- Salafi movement
- Timeline of the Boko Haram insurgency
- Violent extremism
