= Monguno and Nganzai massacres =

- Part of the Boko Haram insurgency
- Location: Goni Usmanti, Mainmari, Mariram, Nganzai LGA, and Monguno, Borno State, Nigeria
- Date: 13 June 2020
- Target: Four locations in Monguno and Goni Usmanti
- Deaths: 98+: 42 civilians in Nganzai; 20 Nigerian soldiers in Monguno; 16+ civilians in Monguno; 20 ISWAP fighters
- Injuries: Unknown
- Perpetrator: ISWAP

On 13 June 2020, the Islamic State – West Africa Province (ISWAP) launched five coordinated attacks on different locations across Borno State, Nigeria. Four of the attacks took place in Monguno and one took place in the village of Goni Usmanti in Nganzai LGA, and over sixty people were killed in the attacks.

== Background ==
A few days before the attacks in Monguno and Nganzai, eighty-one people were killed in a massacre in Gubio by ISWAP on 9 June. The attack was one of the deadliest attacks in recent years by Boko Haram, and was perpetrated by Abu Musab al-Barnawi, who had recently split off from Boko Haram to form the Islamic State – West Africa Province (ISWAP).

== Massacres ==
The first attack began in Goni Usmanti, Nganzai LGA, with ISWAP fighters shooting at residents as they entered the city. In the village, the fighters clashed with a local vigilante group, but the locals were quickly overrun by the jihadists. They then opened fire on a large truck transporting traders, setting the truck ablaze with many of the people inside. Only two people survived by jumping off the truck. The jihadists fled Goni Usmanti when they sighted a convoy of Nigerian troops from Gubio, and attacked the village of Mainmari while retreating. They also burned the village of Mariram. Twenty-nine civilians were killed in Goni Usmanti, and thirteen more were killed in Mainmari.

Around 11:50am, the same group of ISWAP fighters entered Monguno through the Charly 1 and Charly 6 entryways, firing rockets and bullets at the guards. Two Nigerian military checkpoints were attacked in the city around 12:30pm, leading to a shootout between Multinational Joint Task Force (MNJTF) soldiers and the jihadists in the city. The crossfire between the two sides injured and killed a number of civilians. The MNJTF soldiers were overpowered, and ISWAP fighters roamed Monguno for a few hours. The jihadists reached the center of Monguno around 3:13pm, and burned a United Nations humanitarian facility in Monguno, distributing pamphlets to civilians that warned them not to work with Western NGOs. Fifty UN workers were in the facility during the attack, but were unharmed. The ISWAP fighters then burned down a police station.

== Aftermath ==
The Nigerian military released a statement claiming to have successfully repelled the Monguno attack and killed twenty jihadists. There was no mention of the attacks in Nganzai LGA. In Monguno, twenty Nigerian soldiers were killed and at least fifteen civilians were killed. Injured civilians overwhelmed the hospital in Nganzai, with some forced to lay outside the hospital. Sixteen of the wounded civilians in Monguno were transferred to the hospital in Maiduguri on 16 June, although one passed away on the way.

The United Nations expressed their condolences to the victims of the attacks.
