= Nigerian Correctional Service =

Government agency in Nigeria

Agency overview
- Formed: 1861; 165 years ago
- Type: Executive Department
- Jurisdiction: Federal Ministry of Interior
- Headquarters: Abuja
- Parent department: Government of Nigeria
- Key document: Constitution of Nigeria
- Website: cdcfib.gov.ng/history-of-ncs

The Nigerian Correctional Service (NCoS), formerly known as Nigerian Prison Service (NPS), is a government agency of Nigeria which operates prisons. The agency is headquartered in Abuja, and it is under the supervision of the Ministry of the Interior and the Civil Defence, Immigration, Prisons, Fire Service Board. The name was changed from the Nigerian Prisons Service to the Nigerian Correctional Service by President Muhammadu Buhari on 15 August 2019 after signing the Nigerian Correctional Service Act of 2019 into law. The bill was passed by the 8th Assembly of the House of Representatives but the signing was done two months after their tenure had expired. The law divides the Correctional Service into two main areas which are the Custodial Service and Non-custodial Service. The Controller General of the Nigerian Correctional Service is Haliru Nababa, who was appointed by President Muhammadu Buhari on 18 February 2021.

== History ==
=== Origins ===
The origin of modern Correctional Service in Nigeria is 1861. That was the year when conceptually, Western-type prison was established in Nigeria. The declaration of Lagos as a colony in 1861 marked the beginning of the institution of formal machinery of governance. At this stage the preoccupation of the colonial government was to protect legitimate trade, guarantee the profit of British merchants as well as guarantee the activities of the missionaries. To this end, by 1861, the acting governor of the Lagos colony and who was then a prominent British merchant in Lagos, formed a Police Force of about 25 constables. This was followed in 1863 by the establishment in Lagos of four courts: a Police court to resolve petty disputes, a criminal court to try the more serious cases, a slave court to try cases arising from the efforts to abolish the trade in slaves and a commercial court to resolve disputes among merchants and traders. The functioning of these courts and the police in that colonial setting necessarily meant that prison was needed to complete the system. And it was not long in coming for in 1872, the Broad Street prison was established with an initial inmate capacity of 300.

In the Niger Delta, the relationship between the local people and the British merchants had before then been moderated by special courts of merchants backed by the British Navy especially with the appointment of John Beecroft as a consul in 1849. The need for a merchant court was underscored by the fact that most conflicts between the merchants and the local people were in the main commercial. Although there was evidence of prison in Bonny at this time, not much is known about its size and content. But those who were later to oppose British rule were usually deported as happened in the case of Jaja of Opobo and King Dappa of Bonny.

However, the progressive incursion of the British into the hinterland and the establishment of British protectorate towards the end of the 19th century necessitated the establishment of the prisons as the last link in the Criminal Justice System. Thus by 1910, there already were prisons in Degema, Calabar, Onitsha, Benin, Ibadan, Sapele, Jebba and Lokoja. The declaration of protectorates over the East, West and North by 1906 effectively brought the entire Nigeria area under British rule. However, that did not mark the beginning of a unified Nigerian Prisons.

Even so, the colonial prison at this stage was not designed to reform anyone. There was no systematic penal policy from which direction could be sought for penal administration. Instead, prisoners were in the main used for public works and other jobs for the colonial administration. For this reason, there was no need for the recruitment of trained officers of the prisons. Hence colonial prisons had no trained and developed staff of their own and instead the police also performed prison duties. As time went on ex-servicemen were recruited to do the job.

They were also very poorly run, and the local prison conditions varied from one place to another in their disorganization, callousness and exploitation. But so long as they served the colonial interests of ensuring law and order, collecting taxes, and providing labour for public works, they were generally left alone. The result was that the prisons served the purpose of punishing those who had the guts to oppose colonial administration in one form or the other while at the same time cowing those who might want to stir up trouble for the colonial set up.

The Prison regulation was published in 1917 to prescribe admission, custody, treatment and classification procedures as well as staffing, dieting and clothing regimes for the prisons. These processes were limited in one very general sense. They were not geared towards any particular type of treatment of inmates. Instead, they represent just policies of containment of those who were already in prison. Besides, they were limited in application to those who were convicted or remanded in custody by criminal courts of the British-inspired supreme or provincial types. Those remanded or convicted by the Native courts were sent to the Native Authority prisons. The prison regulation also distinguished between Awaiting Trial and convicted inmates and even stipulated the convict – category to be found in each type of prison. But the limited application of this general rule to the national Prison while the native Authority Prison went their own way effectively stultified the appearance of a national Prison goal-orientation in terms of inmate treatment.

=== Modernization ===
It was not until 1934 that any meaningful attempt was made to introduce relative modernization into the Prison Service. It was at this time that Colonel V. L. Mabb was appointed Director of Prisons by the then Governor Sir Donald Cameron. Although a military officer, Mabb had an understanding of what prisons should be. And he went on to do his best. What he seemed to have focused his attention on was the formation of a unified Prison structure for the whole country, but he failed. Yet he succeeded in extending the substantive Director of Prisons' supervisory and inspectoral powers over the Native Authority Prisons by this time dominant in the North. It was also during his tenure that the Prisons Warders Welfare Board was formed.

His efforts were to be continued by his successor R. H. Dolan (1946–1955). Dolan was a trained prison officer and when he assumed duties in Nigeria he already had a wealth of experience in prison administration in both Britain and the colonies. Although a scheme for the introduction of vocational training in the National Prisons had been introduced in 1917 and it failed except in Kaduna and Lokoja prisons where it was functioning in 1926, Dolan reintroduced it in 1949 as a cardinal part of a penal treatment in Nigeria. He also made classification of prisoners mandatory in all prisons and went on to introduce visits by relations to inmates. He also introduced progressive earning schemes for long term first offenders. He also transferred the Prisons Headquarters formerly in Enugu to Lagos to facilitate close cooperation with other Department of State. He also introduced moral and adult education classes to be handled by competent Ministers and teachers for both Christian and Islamic education. Programmes for recreation and relaxation of prisoners were introduced during his tenure as well as the formation of an association for the care and rehabilitation of discharged prisoners. But above all, he initiated a programme for the construction and expansion of even bigger convict prisons to enhance the proper classification and accommodation of prisoners.

On manpower development, he was instrumental to the founding of the Prison Training School, Enugu in 1947. He also saw to the appointment of educated wardresses to take charge of the female wings of the prisons and he generally tried to improve the service conditions of the prison staff. In addition, he took classification a step further when in 1948 he opened four reformatories in Lagos and converted part of the Port-Harcourt prisons for the housing and treatment of juveniles. Five years later he was to build an open prison in Kakuri – Kaduna to take care of first offenders who had committed such crimes as murder and manslaughter, and who are serving terms of 15 years or more. The idea was to train them with minimum supervision in agriculture so that on discharge they could employ themselves gainfully. In fact, Dolan's tenure represented a very high point in the evolution of Nigeria Prisons Service.

== Prisons ==
Prisons include:

Adamawa State:

- Yola Prison

Ebonyi State:

- Abakiliki Prison

Federal Capital Territory:

- Kuje Medium Prison

Lagos State:

- Ikoyi Prison
- Kirikiri Maximum Security Prison
- Kirikiri Medium Security Prison
- Kirikiri Women's Prison – the only all-women's prison in Nigeria

Edo State:

- Medium Security Prisons, Oko

Yobe State:

- Gashua Maximum Prison

== See also ==
- Bauchi prison break
- Lagos prison break
- Nigeria prison break
