= Battle of Baga (2015) =

- Part of Boko Haram insurgency
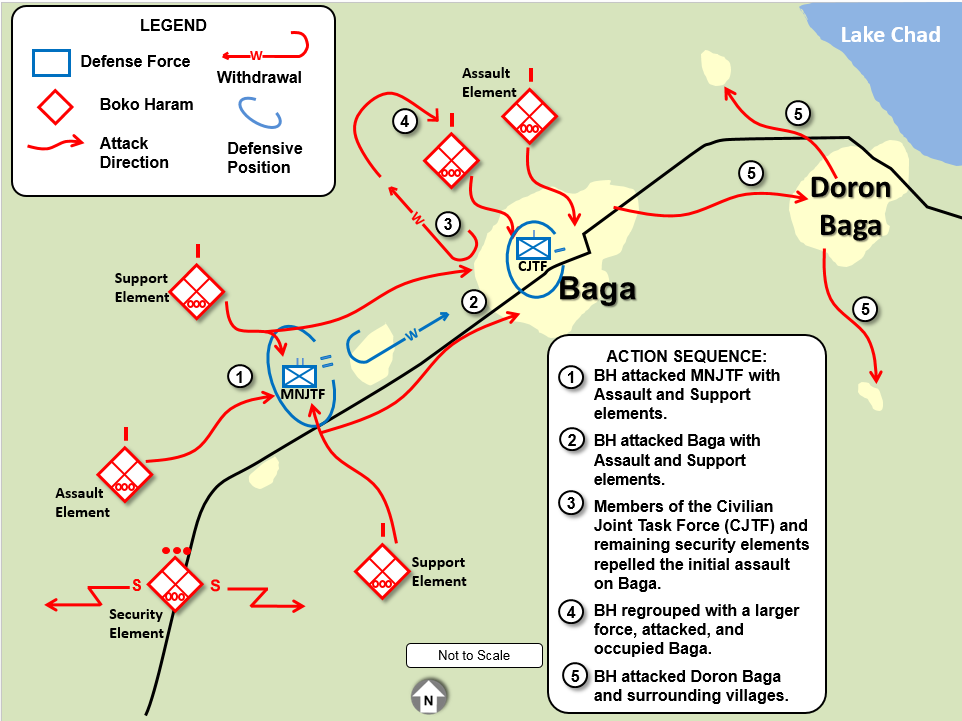
- US Army battle plan of Baga
Date	3 January 2015
Location	Baga and surrounding villages, Borno State, Nigeria
Result	Boko Haram victory: 2015 Baga massacre
Territorial changes	Boko Haram captures Baga and surrounding villages, effectively controlling all of northern Borno State

Belligerents
Nigeria: MNJTF; CJTF	Boko Haram

Commanders and leaders
Enitan Ransome-Kuti	Abubakar Shekau

Casualties and losses
14 killed 30 injured (per Nigeria)	Unknown

On 3 January 2015, militants from Boko Haram attacked a Nigerian military base at Baga, Borno State, Nigeria, seizing the base, town, and surrounding villages. Following Boko Haram's seizure of Baga, hundreds of civilians were massacred by the group.

== Background ==
Boko Haram emerged in 2009 as a jihadist social and political movement in a failed rebellion in northeast Nigeria. Throughout the following years, Abubakar Shekau unified militant Islamist groups in the region and continued to foment the rebellion against the Nigerian government, conducting terrorist attacks and bombings in cities and communities across the region.

In August 2014, Boko Haram launched a campaign to capture several cities in Borno State, capturing Damboa in late July and Gwoza and other cities in August. In each city, the group carried out large-scale massacres against civilians and suspected pro-government people. The campaign continued in Gamboru Ngala, with Boko Haram capturing the city on 25 August and immediately launching attacks on the Cameroonian city of Fotokol. On 1 September, the group captured Bama. In November 2014, Boko Haram fighters captured Malam Fatori in northern Borno State after a lull in their offensive. In December, Damaturu was captured and 115 civilians were killed.

Baga had been the site of fighting between the Nigerian army and Boko Haram since 2013. Between 19 and 22 April 2013, much of Baga was devastated during a battle between the two sides. While the Nigerian military claimed only 37 civilians were killed, a Nigerien senator put the toll at 228. On 10 August 2014, Boko Haram raided the village of Dogon Fill near Baga, kidnapping the men aged 15–30 and burning down the village. Around 28 men were killed. Chadian soldiers intercepted the bus carrying the victims and freed 85 men. On 14 November 2014, 48 fishmongers in Dogon Fill were killed by Boko Haram and their bodies dumped into Lake Chad. After this massacre, the Chadian and Nigerien contingents withdrew their forces from Baga, deeming the area too dangerous.

By January 2015, Baga had a population of 10,000 inhabitants, including the village of Doron Baga. It was the last town in northern Borno State under government control and completely surrounded by jihadists. In 2014, it was made the headquarters of the Multinational Joint Task Force.

== Battle ==
At 5am on 3 January, Boko Haram forces assaulted the MNJTF barracks west of Baga. Several hundred jihadists on pick-ups and APCs attacked the headquarters from multiple directions. Nigerian MNJTF soldiers and pro-government Civilian Joint Task Force (CJTF) militants held out at the base for several hours, but were eventually overrun. The Nigerian soldiers at the base fled because they ran out of ammunition, but many were caught by the jihadists and executed alongside civilians.

The town of Baga itself was attacked at 5:45am. An initial assault was repelled by Nigerian soldiers, CJTF, and civilians armed with machetes. Boko Haram launched a second assault with 200-300 fighters and pick-up trucks. The defenders, fewer in number and less-armed, were defeated. After the capture of Baga, Boko Haram attacked the nearby villages of Kuayen Kuros, Mile 3, Mile 4, Doron Baga, Bundaram, and Babban Gida.

Hundreds of civilians fled across Lake Chad. Several were killed, including women and children, but the exact number is unknown.

== Massacre ==
Initially, no casualty figures were released by Nigerian authorities. Xinhua News Agency reported dozens of deaths, citing local media. In a statement on 10 January, a week after the battle, Nigerian authorities reported 14 soldiers killed and 30 injured in the attack on the barracks. According to Nigerian media, the army lost several armored vehicles, twelve pick-ups, and a large quantity of weapons. General Enitan Ransome-Kuti was dismissed from his post and jailed after the battle.

In the days that followed the massacre, Boko Haram destroyed the town of Baga and sixteen villages on the shores of Lake Chad. Over 3,000 civilians fled to Chad, and 20,000 were displaced to Maiduguri. Between several hundred to over 2,000 civilians were killed in Boko Haram's rampage. Amnesty International called it "perhaps the deadliest massacre in Nigeria's history."
