= Battle of Damaturu (2014) =

- Part of Boko Haram insurgency
Date	1 December 2014
Location	Damaturu, Yobe State, Nigeria
Result	Nigerian victory

Belligerents
Nigeria	Boko Haram

Casualties and losses
44 killed: 38 policemen; 6 soldiers	40+ killed
- 115 civilians killed 78 injured

On 1 December 2014, Boko Haram militants attacked the town of Damaturu, Yobe State, Nigeria. The attack was repelled by Nigerian forces, but at least 115 civilians were killed in the battle, with 78 wounded.

== Background ==
Boko Haram emerged in 2009 as a jihadist social and political movement in a failed rebellion in northeast Nigeria. Throughout the following years, Abubakar Shekau unified militant Islamist groups in the region and continued to foment the rebellion against the Nigerian government, conducting terrorist attacks and bombings in cities and communities across the region.

In August 2014, Boko Haram launched a campaign to capture several cities in Borno State, capturing Damboa in late July and Gwoza and other cities in August. In each city, the group carried out large-scale massacres against civilians and suspected pro-government people. The campaign continued in Gamboru Ngala, with Boko Haram capturing the city on 25 August and immediately launching attacks on the Cameroonian city of Fotokol. On 1 September, the group captured Bama. In November 2014, Boko Haram fighters captured Malam Fatori in northern Borno State after a lull in their offensive.

Damaturu has been attacked several times before during the insurgency due to its location as the capital of Yobe State. In 2011, Boko Haram failed to seize the city, leaving 59 of its members and 41 civilians dead. The group attacked Damaturu again in October 2013, to another failure. The city was also the site of many bombings and civilian attacks by Boko Haram. In June, 21 football fans were killed when Boko Haram bombed a gathering of people watching a football match.

== Battle ==
Boko Haram militants attacked Damaturu at dawn on 1 December. The first site they attacked was the police station on Gujba Road, where many Nigerian policemen were killed. Afterwards, the group moved into residential areas. An anonymous Nigerian official said that there was "chaos throughout the city" during the attacks. Clashes were also reported at the city's prison and the Yobe Governor's residence. Many residents fled into the bush. Nigeria forces were able to repel the attack that evening in a ground and air intervention.

On the same day as the attack, Boko Haram suicide bombers bombed a market in Maiduguri, killing at least five people.

After the battle, 115 bodies were transferred to Sani Abacha hospital, all dressed in civilian clothing. Nigerian police spokesman Emmanuel Ojukwu said that 38 policemen were killed in the battle. The army also reported six deaths.

78 civilians were injured in the attack, 59 of whom were able to leave the hospital by 4 December. At least 40 Boko Haram militants were killed in the battle.
