= Battle of Waza National Park =

- Part of Boko Haram insurgency
Date	February 16, 2015
Location	Gman-Gman, Waza National Park, Far North Region, Cameroon
Result	Cameroonian victory

Belligerents
Cameroon: Rapid Intervention Brigade	Boko Haram

Commanders and leaders
Oumar Nchankou (WIA)	Unknown

Casualties and losses
5 killed 7 injured	94 killed

On February 16, 2015, Boko Haram militants attacked Cameroonian soldiers in Waza National Park, Far North Region, Cameroon. Dozens of militants were killed in the battle.

== Background ==
Boko Haram emerged in 2009 as a jihadist social and political movement in a failed rebellion in northeast Nigeria. Throughout the following years, Abubakar Shekau unified militant Islamist groups in the region and continued to foment the rebellion against the Nigerian government, conducting terrorist attacks and bombings in cities and communities across the region.

On January 14, 2015, following a meeting between the Cameroonian Minister of Defense and Chadian President Idriss Déby, the Chadian government announced it would send troops to northern Cameroon to defend against Boko Haram attacks. By January 28, Chadian soldiers had deployed to Fotokol, a border town separated from the Boko Haram-controlled Nigerian border town of Gamboru Ngala. Fotokol had been attacked several times prior, most recently in September 2014. Chadian soldiers defended Cameroon in the battle of Bodo shortly after deployment, killing hundreds of Boko Haram fighters. On February 6, Boko Haram massacred hundreds of civilians in Fotokol.

Waza National Park has been the scene of various Boko Haram activities. An attack in May 2014 on a Chinese government site in Waza led to the Cameroonian government declaring war on Boko Haram. Two French tourists were kidnapped in the park in 2013, funding Boko Haram via ransom. Several Chinese workers were kidnapped in the park a year later. Eleven civilians were killed in the park in January 2015.

== Battle ==
Boko Haram militants attacked Cameroonian soldiers on patrol in the park on February 16. The attack took place in the village of Gman-Gman, near the Chadian border and five kilometers away from a Rapid Intervention Brigade base. One of the vehicles that the fighters entered Waza with, later captured by Cameroonian soldiers, had "PMF Training College, Gwoza" on it, a spoil of war from the fall of Gwoza in late 2014. A series of clashes broke out between the two sides, starting in the morning and ending late in the afternoon. After incapacitating the initial patrol group, the militants attacked the Rapid Intervention Brigade base. Oumar Nchankou, the commander of Cameroonian forces in Waza, said that the fighting was more intense than anything he's ever seen before. Nchankou was injured in the knee during the attack.

The Cameroonian army said that 86 militants were killed in the battle, and five Cameroonian soldiers were killed. Seven other soldiers were injured. Eight more bodies were discovered in the following days, leaving 94 militants dead.
