= Battle of Malam Fatori (2014) =

- Part of Boko Haram insurgency
Date	5–9 November 2014
Location	Malam Fatori, Borno State, Nigeria
Result	Boko Haram victory
Territorial changes	Malam Fatori falls under Boko Haram control

Belligerents
Nigeria; Multinational Joint Task Force: Chad; Niger	Boko Haram

Strength
Unknown	Several hundred

Casualties and losses
13 injured 315 flee to Niger	Several dozen killed
- 21+ civilians killed <30,000 civilians displaced

Between 5 and 9 November 2014, Boko Haram attacked the town of Malam Fatori, Borno State, Nigeria, capturing it after a four-day battle. Several dozen civilians were killed.

== Background ==
Boko Haram emerged in 2009 as a jihadist social and political movement in a failed rebellion in northeast Nigeria. Throughout the following years, Abubakar Shekau unified militant Islamist groups in the region and continued to foment the rebellion against the Nigerian government, conducting terrorist attacks and bombings in cities and communities across the region.

In August 2014, Boko Haram launched a campaign to capture several cities in Borno State, capturing Damboa in late July and Gwoza and other cities in August. In each city, the group carried out large-scale massacres against civilians and suspected pro-government people. The campaign continued in Gamboru Ngala, with Boko Haram capturing the city on 25 August and immediately launching attacks on the Cameroonian city of Fotokol. On 1 September, the group captured Bama.

Malam Fatori is located in Borno along the Nigerian border with Niger.

== Battle ==
At 5pm on 5 November, Boko Haram militants attempted to capture the town of Malam Fatori, but were blocked by stiff resistance from Nigerian soldiers backed by Chadian and Nigerien soldiers in the Multinational Joint Task Force (MNJTF). Nigerian Senator Maina Maaji Lawan said that the first attack was repelled. After the first attack, the soldiers thought the incursions were over, but Boko Haram mobilized more troops and armored vehicles for a second attack.

In the second attack, at least 21 civilians were killed and 30 wounded when the militants stormed the city. Dozens of militants were killed in Nigerian and coalition attempts to repulse the attack from the ground and air. 315 Nigerian soldiers fled across the border into Niger as well, thirteen of them receiving treatment for their injuries, and were repatriated by 9 November. Thousands of civilians were forced to flee across the Komadougou river into Nigerien territory, seeking refuge in the town of Bosso. The prefect of Bosso said that while some refugees had found families to stay with, many Nigerians were forced to sleep on the streets.

Senator Lawan said that Boko Haram did not control the town as of 6 November, but intermittent clashes continued until 9 November. Between 6 and 9 November, Boko Haram consolidated their control over Malam Fatori.

== Aftermath ==
Later reports said that almost all of Malam Fatori's 30,000 residents fled the town during Boko Haram's seizure of the city. Those who stayed said that the group was extremely repressive, with one man saying "We had to ask permission for everything". Malam Fatori became the largest Boko Haram stronghold in northern Nigeria between November 2014 and April 2015.

Nigerian, Nigerien, and Chadian troops recaptured Malam Fatori in April 2015. Boko Haram fighters continued to launch small attacks on the town from the nearby forest.
