= 2015 Fotokol attack =

2015 massacre by Boko Haram in Cameroon

- Part of the Boko Haram insurgency
- 2015 Fotokol attack (Cameroon)
- Location: 12.3773°N 14.2231°E; Fotokol, Cameroon
- Date: 4–5 February 2015
- Attack type: Massacre, mass shooting, arson
- Deaths: 91 / 100
- Injuries: 500
- Perpetrator: Boko Haram

The 2015 Fotokol attack occurred on 4 and 5 February 2015 when Boko Haram militants reportedly killed at least 91 people by shooting and burning, and injured over 500 in Fotokol, Cameroon. The militants, who are based in northeastern Nigeria and active in Chad, Niger and northern Cameroon, also torched mosques and churches of the town. This attack came a day after the regional forces said it had driven Boko Haram from Gambaru, a Nigerian town close by. This was the second foreign country attack by the militants in 2015. This region of Niger is an area where refugees had arrived by the thousands seeking safety from Boko Haram attacks.

Cameroonian troops and Chadian forces have been deployed as a regional force to fight back. The Chadian army has claimed to have killed around 200 militants. The United Nations had also provided support with weapons, logistics, and operations for this multinational effort against Boko Haram.

== Background ==
Boko Haram emerged in 2009 as a jihadist social and political movement in a failed rebellion in northeast Nigeria. Throughout the following years, Abubakar Shekau unified militant Islamist groups in the region and continued to foment the rebellion against the Nigerian government, conducting terrorist attacks and bombings in cities and communities across the region.

On January 14, 2015, following a meeting between the Cameroonian Minister of Defense and Chadian President Idriss Déby, the Chadian government announced it would send troops to northern Cameroon to defend against Boko Haram attacks. By January 28, Chadian soldiers had deployed to Fotokol, a border town separated from the Boko Haram-controlled Nigerian border town of Gamboru Ngala. Fotokol had been attacked several times prior, most recently in September 2014. Chadian soldiers defended Cameroon in the battle of Bodo shortly after deployment, killing hundreds of Boko Haram fighters.

Since the fall of Gamboru Ngala in the autumn of 2014, the Cameroonian town of Fotokol has seen many attacks by Boko Haram from Gamboru Ngala. Gamboru Ngala and Fotokol are separated by a 500 meter long bridge, and until February 1, Gamboru Ngala on the Nigerian side was controlled by Boko Haram, and Fotokol was controlled by Cameroonian and Chadian forces. Cameroonian and Chadian forces seized Gamboru Ngala on February 3.

== Massacre ==
At dawn on February 4, Boko Haram militants launched a counter-attack, by-passing Chadian positions and attacking Fotokol directly. The first group of militants arrived from the north at 2:00 am, and the second group arrived at fajr prayer at 5:39am. When the second group arrived, the militants crossed the bridge and entered the town's main mosque. A third group entered Fotokol from the dry riverbed. At least thirty people were killed and beheaded in the mosque, including the main marabout. The jihadists then entered three more mosques in the city, slaughtering everyone inside. The massacre lasted for nearly six hours, and only men were targeted. The great mosque and sixty houses were set on fire.

Cameroonian forces intervened, with troops from Kousséri, Mora, and Kolofata dispatched as reinforcements. Some Chadian troops entered Fotokol from Gamboru Ngala. Clashes between Boko Haram and the government forces began around 10am and lasted until late in the morning. The jihadists were forced out of Fotokol by the afternoon.

== Casualties ==
On the evening of February 4, local media reported that seven Cameroonian soldiers, nine Chadian soldiers, and between 50 and 100 jihadists were killed in the clashes. The death toll later rose to 13 Chadians killed. Issa Tchiroma, Cameroon's Minister of Communications, said that 50 of the original 800 attackers were killed.

Initial reports by Agence France-Presse said that 70 civilians and six Cameroonian soldiers were killed, while Reuters said that upwards of 100 civilians were killed. The leader of a local human rights organization said that 370 civilians were killed in the massacre and 248 were injured. Cameroonian newspaper L'Oeil du Sahel reported that 400 civilians were killed, along with 143-300 jihadists, sixteen Chadian soldiers, and seven Cameroonian soldiers. Alwihda Info reported that 397 civilians and 327 militants were killed. Cameroonian Minister of Defense Edgar Alain Mebe Ngo'o said that 81 civilians, 13 Chadian soldiers, and eight Cameroonian soldiers were killed; however, RFI said that on the ground, the death toll for civilians was about 400 and the army's numbers did not reflect the ground situation.
