= Fall of Bama =

- Part of Boko Haram insurgency
Date	1 September 2014
Location	Bama, Borno State, Nigeria
Result	Boko Haram victory: Massacres of civilians ensue
Territorial changes	Boko Haram captures Bama

Belligerents
Nigeria	Boko Haram

Strength
350-1,000 soldiers	Unknown

Casualties and losses
Heavy	70 killed (per Nigeria)
- 50+ civilians killed 218+ civilians killed during the occupation of the town 26,000 civilians forced to flee

On 1 September 2014, militants from Boko Haram attacked the town of Bama, Borno State, Nigeria, seizing control of the city. The attack was the fourth attempt to take control of the city since the start of the Boko Haram insurgency in 2009, with three assaults in 2013 and early 2014 ending in failure. At least 50 civilians were killed in the aftermath of the battle.

== Background ==
Boko Haram emerged in 2009 as a jihadist social and political movement in a failed rebellion in northeast Nigeria. Throughout the following years, Abubakar Shekau unified militant Islamist groups in the region and continued to foment the rebellion against the Nigerian government, conducting terrorist attacks and bombings in cities and communities across the region.

In August 2014, Boko Haram launched a campaign to capture several cities in Borno State, capturing Damboa in late July and Gwoza and other cities in August. In each city, the group carried out large-scale massacres against civilians and suspected pro-government people. The campaign continued in Gamboru Ngala, with Boko Haram capturing the city on 25 August and immediately launching attacks on the Cameroonian city of Fotokol.

Prior to the battle, Bama had a population of 270,000. Boko Haram attacked Bama on 19 February 2014, killing 89 people. On 25 August, the same day Gamboru Ngala fell, a military commander in Bama had received a letter from Boko Haram announcing the attack, and had forwarded it to his commander. Two days before the attack, Nigerian soldiers prevented civilians - by which point had known about the impending attack - from leaving, saying that "If [the people] leave we would have no one left to protect ... Nothing will happen to Bama."

== Battle ==
The jihadists attacked Bama at dawn. The 1,000 Nigerian soldiers defending the city and it's barracks initially had the advantage, despite being the first place to be attacked. Around 350 soldiers from the 202nd Battalion of the 7th Division were present at the barracks. Several soldiers were killed in the initial incursion. The tide of the battle turned after a Nigerian aircraft mistakenly bombed the barracks, which was under military control at the time. The barracks was destroyed in the bombing, opening it up to the militants who overran the remaining soldiers.

Many civilians fled the city during the fighting, headed towards Maiduguri. Civilians interviewed by AFP told journalists that the city had fallen to Boko Haram after the Nigerian army abandoned it, and that 400 soldiers had fled with them. The Nigerian army denied these accusations and claimed to have repelled the attack. In a statement, Nigerian officials claimed the deaths of 70 militants.

Nigerian senator for Borno State, Ahmed Zana, said on 3 September that Bama had fallen after a five-hour defense by Nigerian soldiers. Zana said that while Boko Haram allowed women to flee, men were hunted down in large numbers and that the death toll was unknown because no one had the time to count the bodies. Zana lambasted the Nigerian army for misrepresenting the situation, and said that there was no plan at the moment to retake Bama, and that no soldiers remained in the town.

Once they seized control of the city, the militants immediately went house-to-house and shot civilians. Around 26,000 fled the city, and militants would search through the bush to fid groups of people attempting to flee. Men caught fleeing were rounded up and executed on the spot. Survivors of the battle who remained in the city told Amnesty International that Boko Haram fighters searched for men that had been part of the pro-government Civilian Joint Task Force (CJTF) militias, and often detained and tortured men suspected of being CJTF without evidence. One fighter told a civilian that "when they see people from Maiduguri, Gwoza, and Bama, [we] would kill them."

== Aftermath ==
Under Boko Haram control, Bama residents were forced to adhere to a strict interpretation of Islam. Punishment for breaking Boko Haram's laws included public floggings and stonings. Many women and men who defied Boko Haram were crowded into the city's prison. Men were executed, and women were raped and forced into slavery. One survivor of the prisons said that one section had at least 200 bodies of detainees; in another incident, 18 men were killed by Boko Haram prison guards. Christians were forcibly converted.

Nigerian forces recaptured Bama in March 2015, and Boko Haram fighters in the city massacred dozens of civilians as the soldiers got closer to the city. Large portions of the city were torched.
