= First Battle of Bosso (2015) =

Battle in Bosso, Niger

Battle of Bosso
- Part of Boko Haram insurgency
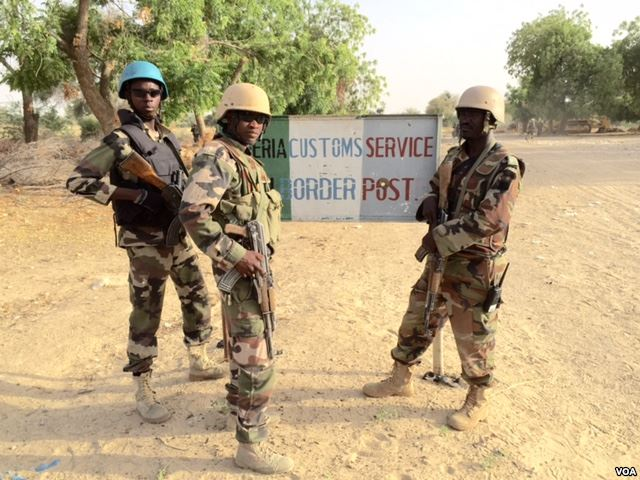
- Nigerien soldiers in Diffa, March 2015
Date	February 6, 2015
Location	Bosso and Diffa, Diffa Region, Niger
Result	Nigerien-Chadian victory: Boko Haram fighters repelled

Belligerents
Niger; Chad	Boko Haram

Commanders and leaders
Abdoul Kadri Amadou; Daoud Yaya (WIA)	Unknown

Strength
4,000; 2,500	Several hundred

Casualties and losses
8 killed, 15 injured 8 killed	292 killed (per Niger); 400+ killed (per Chad)
- 1 civilian killed

On February 6, 2015, Boko Haram militants attacked the town of Bosso, Niger, the first attack by Boko Haram in Niger. Hundreds of militants were killed by the defending Chadian and Nigerien soldiers.

== Background ==
Boko Haram emerged in 2009 as a jihadist social and political movement in a failed rebellion in northeast Nigeria. Throughout the following years, Abubakar Shekau unified militant Islamist groups in the region and continued to foment the rebellion against the Nigerian government, conducting terrorist attacks and bombings in cities and communities across the region.

In February 2015, fighting was ongoing south of Lake Chad between Chadian and Cameroonian troops in Fotokol and Boko Haram militants in Gamboru Ngala. Meanwhile, the Nigerian army was preparing a troop deployment to the Nigeria-Niger border west of Lake Chad. About 4,000 Nigerien soldiers were deployed to Bosso, on the Nigerien side of border facing the Nigerian town of Malam Fatori, under Boko Haram control since November 2014. French troops participating in Operation Barkhane also established a liaison in Diffa with 15 to 20 men, supplying the Nigerien and Chadian troops with fuel and ammunition.

== Battle ==
Accounts by locals differ as to when the attack officially started; some said a fighter jet flew over and bombed Boko Haram positions in Malam Fatori, leading Boko Haram to retaliate. Others said that Boko Haram's attack was unprovoked.

On February 6, several hundred jihadists crossed the Komadougou Yobe river separating Malam Fatori and Bosso, assaulting Nigerien army forces for the first time. Sleeper cells that had infiltrated into the refugee camp in Bosso also launched an attack. Fighting began around 9am, and Nigerien and Chadian forces quickly gained the upper hand. Boko Haram militants stormed civilian houses in Bosso. Boko Haram fighters were repelled across the river by the afternoon. The fighters that retreated were followed by sweep operations in the Gangara Forest.

Rene Carayol, a journalist with Jeune Afrique described the militants as "bewitched", "possessed", and "bloodthirsty", and suggested the attackers were locals that had been abducted or on drugs. Many were armed with only knives, arrows, and stones. Jean-Louis Le Touzet from Libération corroborated Carayol's description, saying that most of the fighters were under-equipped, under 15 years old, malnourished, and covered in dirt. There was one weapon for every three fighters. The inexperienced Nigerien soldiers panicked at the onslaught of fighters; it was the Chadians who massacred them with heavy weapons.

Artillery was also fired by Boko Haram towards Diffa, the capital of Diffa Region and a city bordering the Boko Haram-controlled Nigerian town of Damasak. In response, Nigerien and Chadian troops invaded Damasak and expelled the militants.

== Aftermath ==
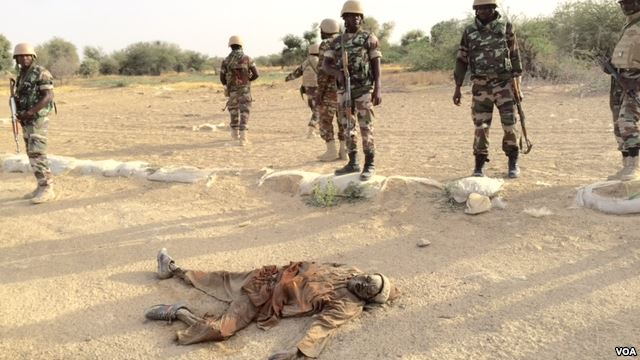
A dead Boko Haram fighter in Diffa, March 2015.

Bosso was almost entirely emptied of inhabitants within a week of the attack, many fleeing elsewhere in fear of another Boko Haram attack. On the evening of February 6, Nigerien Minister of Defense Karidjo Mahamadou said that four Nigerien soldiers were killed, 17 wounded, and two were missing. Karidjo also said that 109 Boko Haram fighters were killed, along with one civilian. A Chadian general said that at least 200 decomposing bodies of Boko Haram fighters were visible in the Bosso and Mamouri valleys. Several dozen bodies were visible on the Nigerian side of the river. Later, Nigerien and Chadian troops dug mass graves along the Komadougou Yobe river for the slain fighters in fear of a cholera outbreak. During the burials, Chadian military spokesman Azem Bermandoa said that at least 400 bodies were counted. Some were thrown into the river.

The commander of Chadian forces in Bosso, Daoud Yaya, was injured in the battle. A Boko Haram fighter had pretended to be killed before shooting Yaya in the stomach.

In a press release in March, the Nigerien government said that the death toll for all clashes between February 6 and March 8 was 24 Nigeriens killed and 38 injured and 513 Boko Haram fighters, of which 292 were in Bosso. Nigerien General Moussa Salaou Barmou announced in April that eight Nigerien soldiers and 292 Boko Haram fighters were killed in Bosso. Twenty militants were arrested in Niger following the attack. Abdoul Kadri Amadou, who led the Nigerien soldiers in Bosso at the time, said Boko Haram left behind a lot of heavy equipment.

Bosso was attacked again by Boko Haram on February 8, leaving five Chadians injured and ten Boko Haram fighters dead. Sporadic shootouts occurred in the following days between the Chadians and Nigeriens in Bosso and militants in Malam Fatori.
