= First Battle of Dikwa =

- Part of Boko Haram insurgency
Date	17 February 2015
Location	Near Dikwa, Borno State, Nigeria
Result	Chadian victory: Second Battle of Dikwa

Belligerents
Chad	Boko Haram

Commanders and leaders
Brahim Seid Mahamat	Unknown

Strength
2,500	Unknown

Casualties and losses
2 killed 9 injured	117 killed

On 17 February 2015, Chadian troops seized a Boko Haram camp near Dikwa, Borno State, Nigeria, killing over 100 militants.

== Background ==
Boko Haram emerged in 2009 as a jihadist social and political movement in a failed rebellion in northeast Nigeria. Throughout the following years, Abubakar Shekau unified militant Islamist groups in the region and continued to foment the rebellion against the Nigerian government, conducting terrorist attacks and bombings in cities and communities across the region.

On 14 January 2015, following a meeting between the Cameroonian Minister of Defense and Chadian President Idriss Déby, the Chadian government announced it would send troops to northern Cameroon to defend against Boko Haram attacks. By 28 January, Chadian soldiers had deployed to Fotokol, a border town separated from the Boko Haram-controlled Nigerian border town of Gamboru Ngala. Chadian soldiers defended Cameroon in the battle of Bodo shortly after deployment, killing hundreds of Boko Haram fighters. In late January, they then successfully recaptured Gamboru Ngala from Boko Haram, and Nigeria allowed the Chadian government to conduct operations in Nigeria. About 2,500 Chadian soldiers were in Borno State prior to the battle.

== Battle ==
Clashes broke out between Chadian troops and Boko Haram on 17 February near Dikwa, on the road to Maiduguri from Gamboru Ngala. The fighting lasted for two to three hours, and Chadian forces seized the Boko Haram camp. The following day, Chadian Army Chief of Staff Brahim Seid Mahamat said that 117 jihadists were killed, along with two Chadian soldiers and nine soldiers wounded.

The town of Dikwa was not attacked during the fighting, and remained in Boko Haram control.

== Aftermath ==
The success of the Chadian soldiers allowed them to recoup and launch another attack on Dikwa, this time on the main town, on 2 March.
