= International relations since 1989 =

International relations since 1989 covers the main trends in world affairs in the post–Cold War era.

== Trends ==
The 21st century has been marked by growing economic globalization and integration, with consequent increased risk to interlinked economies, as exemplified by the Great Recession. This period has also seen the expansion of communications with mobile phones and the Internet, which have caused fundamental societal changes in business, politics, and how individuals networked along common interests and sought information.

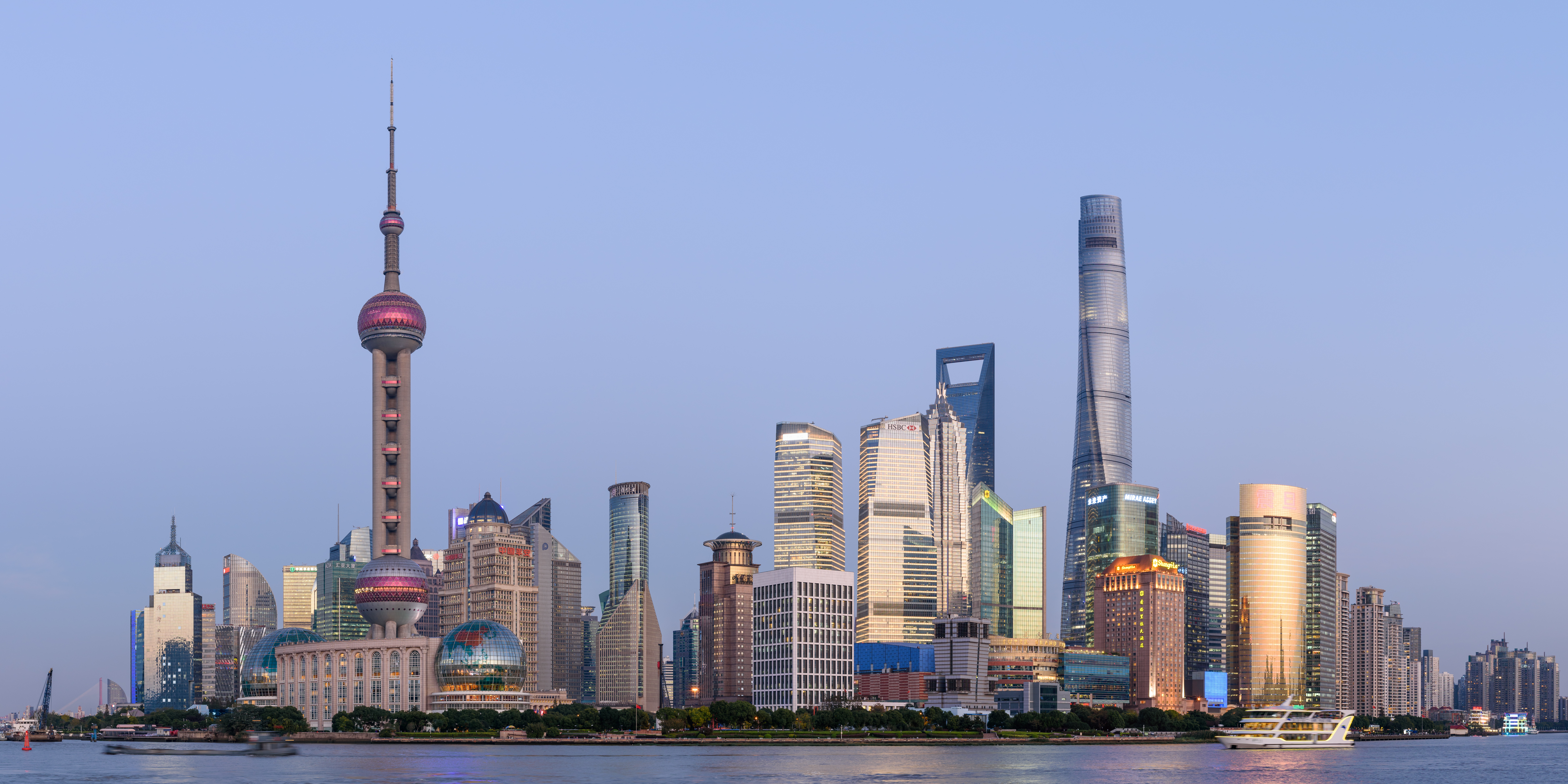
China urbanized rapidly after 1989 and grew the second largest economy (Shanghai pictured).

Worldwide competition for natural resources has risen due to growing populations and industrialization, especially in India, China, and Brazil. The increased demands are contributing to increased environmental degradation and to global warming.

International tensions were heightened in connection with the efforts of some nuclear-armed states to induce North Korea to give up its nuclear weapons, and to prevent Iran from developing nuclear weapons.

In 2020 the COVID-19 pandemic became the first pandemic since 1919 to substantially disrupt global trading and cause recessions in the global economy.

=== 1990s ===
The 1990s saw a dramatic advance in technology, with the World Wide Web. Predominant factors and trends included the continued mass mobilization of capital markets through neoliberalism, the thawing and sudden end of the Cold War after four decades of fear, the beginning of the widespread proliferation of new media such as the Internet and email, and increasing skepticism towards government. The dissolution of the Soviet Union in 1991 led to a realignment and reconsolidation of economic and political power across the world and within countries. The dot-com bubble of 1997–2000 brought wealth to some entrepreneurs before its crash between 2000 and 2001.

New ethnic conflicts started in Africa and the Balkans, causing the Rwandan and Bosnian genocides. Signs of any resolution of tensions between Israel and the Arab world remained elusive despite the progress of the Oslo Accords. On a peaceful note, after 30 years of violence, the Troubles in Northern Ireland came to a standstill with the signing of the Good Friday Agreement in 1998.

==== Collapse of communist parties ====
Communist party support collapsed rapidly in most of the world (outside East Asia). Adherents were shocked at the failure of Gorbachev to reform and reestablish communism in Russia, and the quick overthrow in Eastern Europe in 1989. The Kremlin ended financial aid and leadership roles. For example, financial aid to multiple countries in Latin America was ended in budget cutbacks.

==== Rise of neoliberalism ====
Neoliberalism became a main trend in many developed countries. It meant heavy reliance on market capitalism, and global flows of investment, together with deregulation and cutbacks in welfare spending. Economist Milton Friedman, leader of the Chicago school of economics, was a prominent exponent. In the 1980s, Ronald Reagan and Margaret Thatcher had led the way in the United States and the United Kingdom.

=== 2000s ===
==== Worldwide economic downturn ====
The early part of the decade saw the long-time predicted breakthrough of economic giant China, which had double-digit growth during nearly the whole decade. To a lesser extent, India also benefited from an economic boom, which saw the two most populous countries becoming an increasingly dominant economic force. The rapid catching-up of emerging economies with developed countries sparked some protectionist tensions during the period and was partly responsible for an increase in energy and food prices at the end of the decade. The economic developments in the latter third of the decade were dominated by a worldwide economic downturn, which started with the crisis in housing and credit in the United States in late 2007 and led to the bankruptcy of major banks and other financial institutions. The 2008 financial crisis led to the Great Recession, beginning in the United States and affecting most of the industrialized world.

==== Internet ====
The growth of the Internet contributed to globalization during the decade, which allowed faster communication among people around the world. Social networking sites arose as a new way for people to stay in touch no matter where they were, as long as they had an internet connection. The first social networking sites were Friendster, Myspace, Facebook, and Twitter, established from 2002 to 2006. Myspace was the most popular social networking website until June 2009, when Facebook overtook it. E-mail continued to be popular throughout the decade and began to replace paper-based "snail mail" as the primary way of sending letters and other messages to people in distant locations.

==== War on terror ====
The war on terror and War in Afghanistan began after the September 11 attacks in 2001. The International Criminal Court was formed in 2002. In 2003, a United States-led coalition invaded Iraq, and the Iraq War led to the end of Saddam Hussein's rule as Iraqi President and the Ba'ath Party in Iraq. Al-Qaeda and affiliated Islamist militant groups performed terrorist acts throughout the decade. The Second Congo War, the deadliest conflict since World War II, ended in July 2003. Further wars that ended included the Algerian Civil War, the Angolan Civil War, the Sierra Leone Civil War, the Second Liberian Civil War, the Nepalese Civil War, and the Sri Lankan Civil War. Wars that began included the conflict in the Niger Delta, the Houthi insurgency in Yemen, and the Mexican drug war.

==== Climate change ====
Climate change and global warming became common concerns in the 2000s. Prediction tools made significant progress during the decade. Since the 1990s, research into historical and modern climate change has expanded rapidly. Measurement networks such as the Global Ocean Observing System, Integrated Carbon Observation System, and NASA's Earth Observing System now enable monitoring of the causes and effects of ongoing change. Research has also broadened, linking many fields such as Earth sciences, behavioral sciences, economics, and climate security. UN-sponsored organizations such as the IPCC gained influence, and studies such as the Stern report influenced public support for paying the political and economic costs of countering climate change. The global temperature kept climbing during the decade. In December 2009, the World Meteorological Organization (WMO) announced that the 2000s may have been the warmest decade since records began in 1850, with four of the five warmest years since 1850 having occurred in this decade. The WMO's findings were later echoed by the NASA and the NOAA.

=== 2010s ===
The decade began with an economic recovery from the Great Recession. Global economic recovery accelerated during the latter half of the decade, fueled by robust consumer spending, increased investment in infrastructure, and the emergence of new technologies. However, the recovery developed unevenly. Socioeconomic crises caused by austerity, inflation, and an increase in commodity prices, led to unrest in many countries, including the 15-M and occupy movements. Unrest in some countries in the Arab world evolved into revolutions in Tunisia, Egypt, and Bahrain as well as civil wars in Libya, Syria, and Yemen in a regional phenomenon that was commonly referred to as the Arab Spring. Meanwhile Europe had to grapple with a debt crises that was pronounced early in the decade. Shifting social norms saw a growth of LGBT rights and female representation.

The United States continued to retain its superpower status while China sought to expand its influence in the South China Sea and in Africa through its economic initiatives and military reforms. It solidified its position as an emerging superpower despite conflicts caused by its territorial claims and internal security policies in Hong Kong, Xinjiang, and Tibet. These developments led the United States to implement a containment policy and initiate a trade war against China. Elsewhere in Asia, the two Koreas improved their relations after a prolonged crisis between the two countries. The war on terror continued as a part of the U.S.'s continued military involvement in many parts of the world. U.S. forces killed Osama bin Laden and The rise of the Islamic State of Iraq and the Levant extremist organization in 2014 erased the Syria-Iraq border, resulting in a multinational intervention against it. In Africa, South Sudan broke away from Sudan, and mass protests and various coups d'état saw longtime strongmen deposed. In the U.S., celebrity businessman Donald Trump was elected president amid an international wave of populism and neo-nationalism. The European Union experienced a migrant crisis in the middle of the decade and withdrawal of the United Kingdom as a member state following the historic United Kingdom EU membership referendum. Russia attempted to assert itself in international affairs, annexing Crimea in 2014.

Information technology progressed, with smartphones becoming widespread. The Internet of things saw substantial growth during the 2010s due to advancements in wireless networking devices, mobile telephony, and cloud computing. Advancements in data processing and the rollout of 4G broadband allowed data and information to disperse among domains at paces never before seen while online resources such as social media facilitated phenomena such as the Me Too movement and the rise of slacktivism, Woke culture and online call-out culture. Online nonprofit organisation WikiLeaks gained international attention for publishing classified information on topics including Guantánamo Bay, Syria, the Afghan and Iraq wars, and United States diplomacy. Edward Snowden blew the whistle on global surveillance, raising awareness on the role governments and private entities have in mass surveillance and information privacy.

=== 2020s ===
==== COVID ====
Before COVID hit in 2020, economic conditions were faltering. The UN reported:

World gross product growth slipped to 2.3 per cent in 2019—the lowest rate since the 2008 financial crisis. This slowdown is occurring alongside growing discontent with the social and environmental quality of economic growth, amid pervasive inequalities and the deepening climate crisis.

In 2020 the COVID-19 pandemic quickly spread to over 200 countries and territories in the world. This pandemic has caused severe global economic disruption, including the largest global recession since the Great Depression. It led to postponement or cancellation of sporting, religious, political and cultural events, widespread supply shortages, leading to panic buying, and decreased emissions of pollutants and greenhouse gases. Many countries have mandatory lockdowns on public movement, and there have been more than 600 million cases, resulting in more than 6 million deaths.

==== United States ====
During the first presidency of Donald Trump, U.S. foreign policy was noted for its unpredictability and reneging on prior international commitments, upending diplomatic conventions, embracing political and economic brinkmanship with most adversaries, and straining relations with traditional allies. Trump's "America First" policy pursued nationalist foreign policy objectives and prioritized bilateral relations over multinational agreements. As president, Trump described himself as a nationalist while espousing isolationist, non-interventionist, and protectionist views; he personally praised some populist, neo-nationalist, illiberal, and authoritarian governments, while antagonizing others, as administration diplomats nominally continued to pursue pro-democracy ideals abroad.

The presidency of Joe Biden emphasized repairing US alliances, which had been damaged under the Trump administration, and returning the U.S. to a "position of trusted leadership" among world democracies to counter challenges from Russia and China. As president, Biden sought to strengthen the transatlantic alliance between the U.S. and Europe, and he recommitted the U.S. to the NATO alliance and collective security. Biden returned the U.S. to the Paris Climate Agreement and has taken other steps to combat climate change. His administration emphasized international cooperation to combat the COVID-19 pandemic, as well as U.S. defenses against foreign-sponsored cyberattacks and cyberespionage.

==== AUKUS ====
AUKUS is a new trilateral security pact between Australia, the UK, and the US, announced on September 15, 2021. It will initially focus on a fleet of nuclear-powered submarines for the Royal Australian Navy. It is designed to counter China's influence in the Indo-Pacific region. AUKUS will enable the three countries to share information in areas including artificial intelligence, cyber, underwater systems and long-range strike capabilities. As part of the pact, the United States and Britain would share their knowledge of how to maintain nuclear defence infrastructure. The agreement is a successor to the existing ANZUS pact between Australia, New Zealand, and the United States, but with New Zealand "sidelined" due to its ban on nuclear technology.

== Geopolitics ==
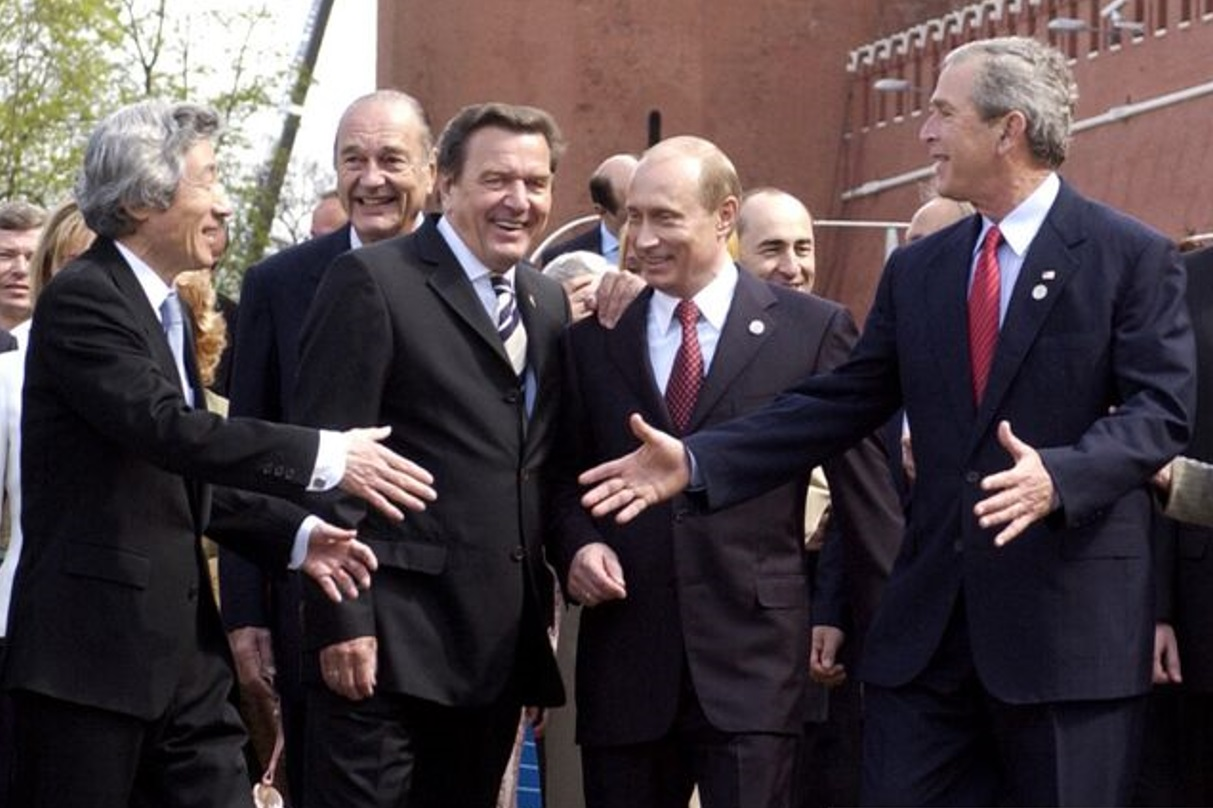
Russian President Vladimir Putin with George W. Bush and other Western leaders in Moscow, May 9, 2005

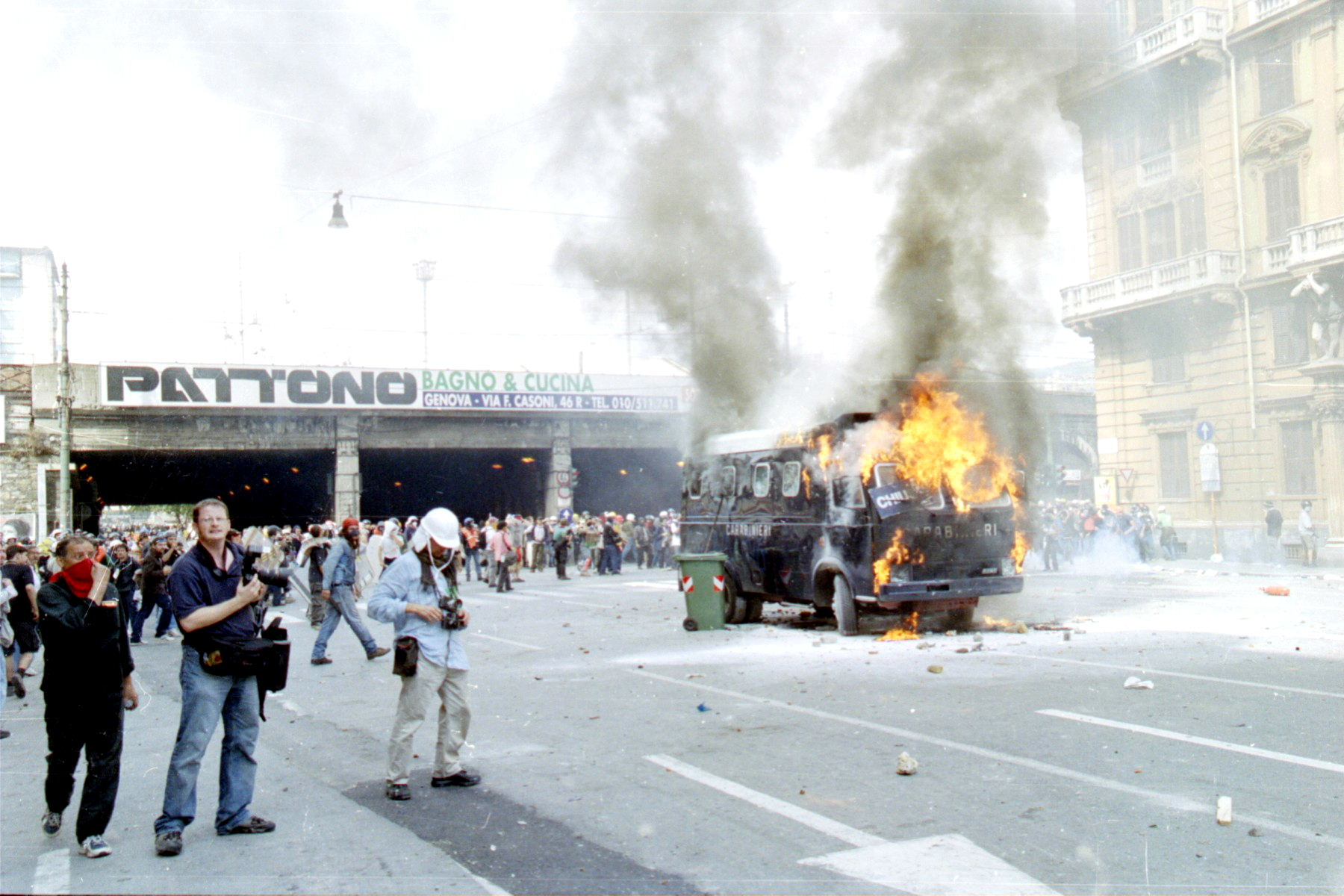
Protesters try to stop members of the G8 from attending the summit during the 27th G8 summit in Genoa, Italy by burning vehicles on the main route to the summit.

=== New countries and territorial changes ===
Some territories have gained independence during the 21st century. This is a list of sovereign states that have gained independence in the 21st century and have been recognized by the UN.

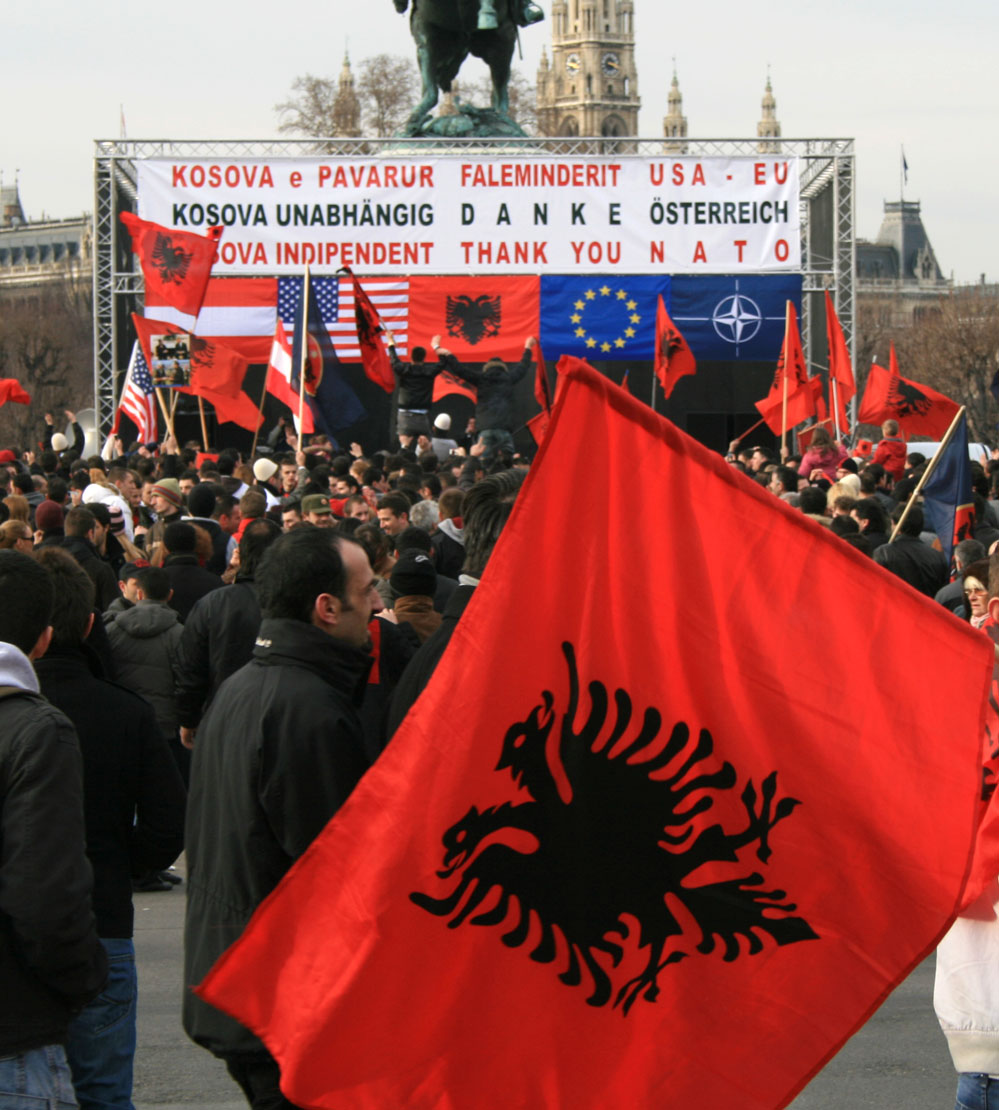
Celebration of the Declaration of Independence of Kosovo

- East Timor East Timor (Timor-Leste) on May 20, 2002.
- Montenegro Montenegro on June 3, 2006.
- Serbia Serbia on June 3, 2006.
- South Sudan South Sudan on July 9, 2011.

These nations gained sovereignty through government reform.

- Comoros Union of the Comoros on December 23, 2001, replaced the Federal Islamic Republic of the Comoros
- Transitional Islamic State of Afghanistan Transitional Islamic State of Afghanistan on July 13, 2002, replaced the Islamic State of Afghanistan
- Serbia and Montenegro State Union of Serbia and Montenegro on February 4, 2003, replaced the Federal Republic of Yugoslavia
- Afghanistan Islamic Republic of Afghanistan on December 7, 2004, replaced the Transitional Islamic State of Afghanistan
- Nepal Federal Democratic Republic of Nepal on May 28, 2008, replaced the Kingdom of Nepal
- Libya National Transitional Council of Libya on October 20, 2011, replaced the Great Socialist People's Libyan Arab Jamahiriya.
- Libya State of Libya on August 8, 2012, replaced the National Transitional Council of Libya.
- Afghanistan Islamic Emirate of Afghanistan on August 15, 2021, replaced the Islamic Republic of Afghanistan.
- Syria Provisional government of Syria on December 8, 2024, replaced Ba'athist Syria.
- Syria Transitional government of Syria on March 29, 2025, replaced the provisional government of Syria.

These territories have declared independence and secured relative autonomy, but they have only been recognized by some UN member states:

- Kosovo on February 17, 2008. (partially recognized)
- Donetsk People's Republic and Luhansk People's Republic in May 2014. Founded by separatists from Ukraine in the war in Donbas. The states briefly confederated as Novorossiya Novorossiya, which was dissolved in 2015. Annexed by Russia in 2022. (partially recognized)
- Rojava on March 17, 2016. Founded by Kurdish separatists in the Syrian civil war, with considerable Arab, Assyrian, and Turkmen populations. (partially recognized)

These territories have declared independence and secured relative autonomy but they lack formal foreign diplomatic relations:

- Wa State Wa State on August 20, 2010. Creation of the Wa Self-Administered Division by decree of the Burmese government.
- Chinland Chinland on December 6, 2023. Adoption of the Chinland Constitution by the Chin National Front during the Burmese civil war.
- Puntland Puntland on April 1, 2024. De facto declaration of independence from Somalia following disagreements regarding the constitutional crisis.

These territories have declared independence and secured relative autonomy but they have been recognized by no one:

- ISIS Islamic State of Iraq and the Levant in June 2014. Had taken over much of Iraq, Syria and Libya. It is considered a terrorist organization.
- South Yemen Southern Transitional Council in March 2017. Claimed the majority of the southern part of Yemen and the restoration of South Yemen.
- Ambazonia Ambazonia on October 1, 2017. Declared as a separate state from predominantly French-speaking Cameroon designated for Anglophone Cameroonians within the boundaries of the former Southern Cameroons. Fighting an ongoing war of liberation against the Cameroonian government.
- Catalonia Republic of Catalonia on October 27, 2017. The Catalan Parliament proclaimed the Catalan Republic, but the Kingdom of Spain did not recognise this and for a time imposed direct rule. (See 2017 Catalan independence referendum and 2017–2018 Spanish constitutional crisis)

These territories were annexed from a sovereign country, the action has only been recognized by some UN member states:

- Crimea Crimea annexed from Ukraine into the Russian Federation on March 18, 2014.
- Donetsk Oblast Donetsk Oblast, Kherson Oblast Kherson Oblast, Luhansk Oblast Luhansk Oblast, Zaporizhzhia Oblast Zaporizhzhia Oblast annexed from Ukraine into the Russian Federation on September 30, 2022.

These territories were ceded to another country:

- Bangladesh India India–Bangladesh enclaves, traded between the two countries in 2015.
- Artsakh Armenian-occupied territories surrounding Nagorno-Karabakh and the Lachin corridor, surrendered by Armenia to Azerbaijan at the end of the 2020 Nagorno-Karabakh war.

== Major issues ==
=== Economics and trade ===
==== Taxation ====
Finance officials from 130 countries agreed on July 1, 2021, to plans for a new global minimum corporate tax rate. All the major economies agreed to pass national laws that would require corporations to pay at least 15% income tax in the countries they operate. This new policy would end the practice of locating world headquarters in small countries with very low taxation rates. Governments hope to recoup some of the lost revenue, estimated at $100 billion to $240 billion each year. The new system was promoted by the United States and the Organization for Economic Cooperation and Development (OECD). Secretary-General Mathias Cormann of the OECD said, "This historic package will ensure that large multinational companies pay their fair share of tax everywhere." On July 10 the finance ministers of the G-20 all approved the plan.

==== Rise of China ====
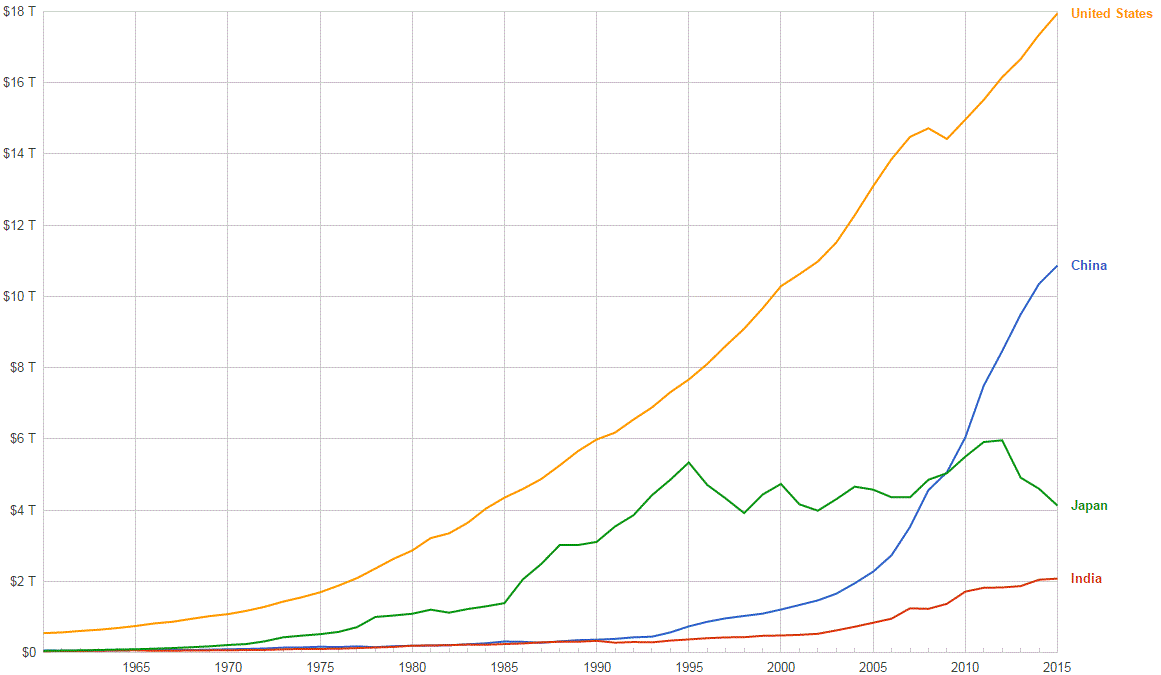
China's nominal GDP trend from 1952 to 2015

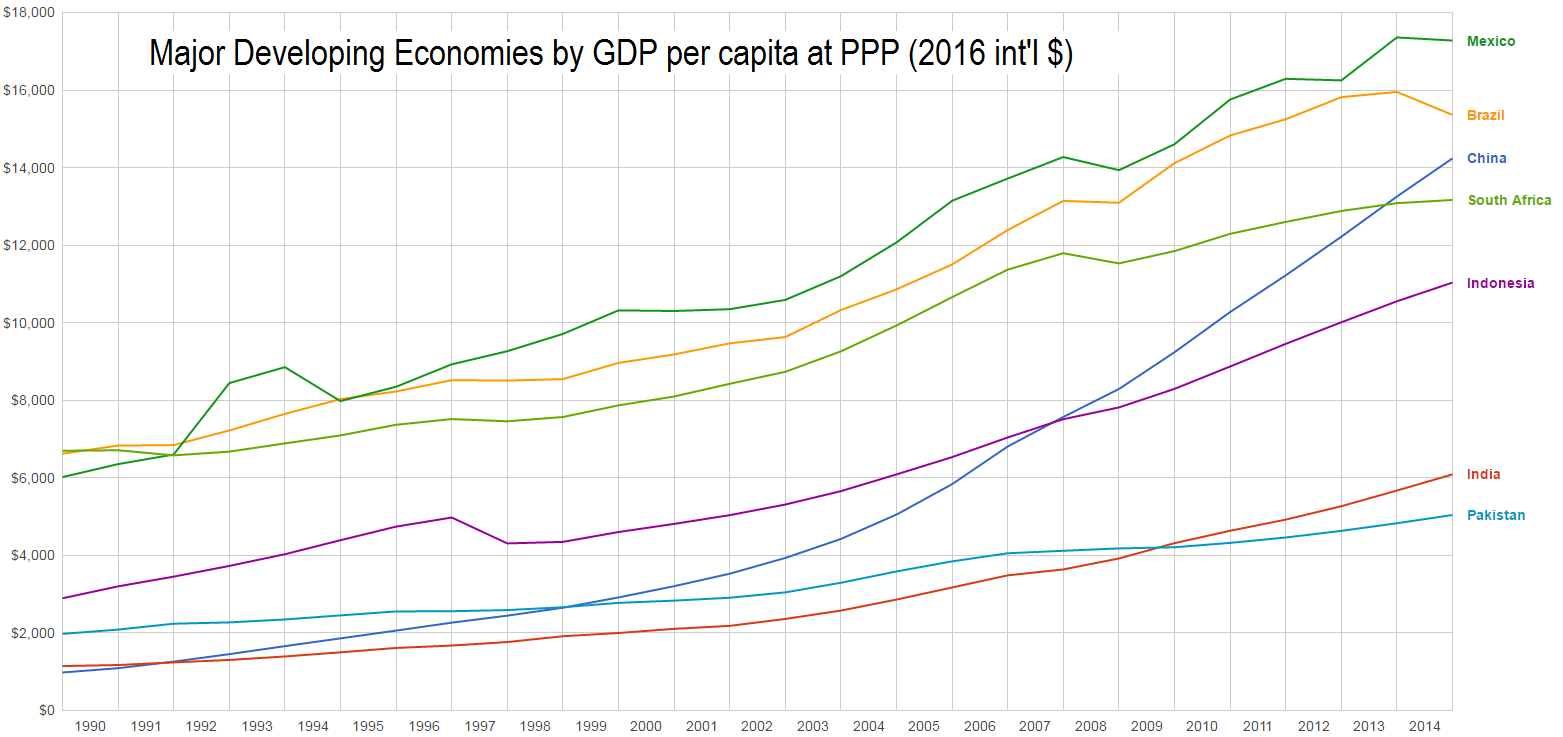
China and other major developing economies by GDP per capita at purchasing-power parity, 1990–2013. The rapid economic growth of China (blue) is readily apparent.

China's economy saw continuous real annual GDP growth 5% to 10% since 1991, by far the highest rate in the world. Starting poor, it became rich as a nation with dwindling pockets of poverty in remote rural areas. A very heavy migration of hundreds of millions of people moved from villages to cities to provide the labor force. In early 1992, Chinese leader Deng Xiaoping made a series of political pronouncements designed to give new impetus to and reinvigorate the process of economic reform. The National Communist Party Congress backed up Deng's renewed push for market reforms, stating that the key task in the 1990s was to create a "socialist market economy". Continuity in the political system but bolder reform in the economic system were announced as the hallmarks of the 10-year development plan. Deng's government spent heavily to improve the infrastructure of highways, subways, railways, airports, bridges, dams, aqueducts and other public works. China became the world's largest manufacturer and exporter. Major problems worsened such as pollution and income inequality. By 2020, the Chinese Communist Party of general secretary Xi Jinping was shifting from manufacturing to consumer services and high technology. Planners hoped the resulting growth, though less rapid, would be more sustainable.

Transportation routes in the Belt and Road Initiative

The Belt and Road Initiative is China's dramatic plan for helping and directing economic development in 70 poor nations of Asia and Africa. It launched in 2013 and focused on massive construction projects involving ocean ports, office buildings, railroads, highways, airports, dams, and tunnels.

==== German recovery ====
The unification of rich West Germany with poor East Germany in the 1990s was an expensive proposition. The German economic miracle petered out in the 1990s, so that by the end of the century and the early 2000s it was ridiculed as "the sick man of Europe." It suffered a short recession in 2003. The economic growth rate was a very low 1.2% annually from 1988 to 2005. Unemployment, especially in the former East, remained high despite heavy stimulus spending. It rose from 9.2% in 1998 to 11.1% in 2009. Germany was the world's largest net exporter of goods from 2002 to 2008. The worldwide Great Recession of 2008–2010 worsened conditions briefly, as there was a sharp decline in GDP. However, unemployment did not rise, and recovery was faster than almost anywhere else. Prosperity was pulled along by exports that reached a record of US$1.7 trillion in 2011, or half of the German GDP, or nearly 8% of all of the exports in the world. While the rest of the European Community struggled with financial issues, Germany took a conservative position based on an extraordinarily strong economy after 2010. The labor market proved flexible, and the export industries were attuned to world demand.

=== Human rights ===
There is a large recent literature on human rights covering a wide variety of topics.

==== Race, poverty, and inequality ====
French economist Thomas Piketty gained international attention in 2013 for his book on Capital in the Twenty-First Century. He focuses on wealth and income inequality in Europe and the US today and since the 18th century. The book's central thesis is that inequality is not an accident but rather a feature of capitalism that can be reversed only through state intervention. The book thus argues that unless capitalism is reformed, the very democratic order will be threatened. The book reached number one on The New York Times bestselling hardcover nonfiction list from May 18, 2014. Piketty offered a "possible remedy: a global tax on wealth".

=== Global warming and environment ===
Since 2000, rising CO_{2} emissions in China and the rest of world have surpassed the output of the United States and Europe.

Per person, the United States generates CO_{2} at a far faster rate than other primary regions.

The politics of climate change results from different perspectives on how to respond to the threat of global warming. Global warming is driven largely by the emissions of greenhouse gases due to human economic activity, especially the burning of fossil fuels, certain industries like cement and steel production, and land use for agriculture and forestry. Since the Industrial Revolution, fossil fuels have provided the main source of energy for economic and technological development. Carbon-intensive industries and people and entities associated with these industries have resisted change to this economic system, despite widespread scientific consensus for the need to mitigate the causes and effects. Despite resistance, efforts to mitigate climate change have been prominent on the international political agenda since the 1990s and are also increasingly addressed at national and local level.

The 1997 Kyoto Protocol included commitments for most developed countries to limit their emissions. During negotiations, the G77 (representing developing countries) pushed for a mandate requiring developed countries to "[take] the lead" in reducing their emissions, since developed countries contributed most to the accumulation of greenhouse gases in the atmosphere, and since per-capita emissions were still relatively low in developing countries and emissions of developing countries would grow to meet their development needs.

In 2019, the five largest sources of global emissions were China (27%), the United States (11%), India (6.6%), and the European Union (6.4%). In April 2021, President Biden presided at a global conference of 40 national leaders who all made commitments on reducing global warming. The U.S. announced that by 2030 it planned to cut its 2005 emission levels in half. CCP general secretary Xi Jinping announced China would limit its coal-based emissions and pledged net-zero emissions by 2060.

=== International rivalry ===
==== US versus China ====
According to German scholar Peter Rudolph in 2020, the Sino-American conflict syndrome involves six elements:

- It is based on a regional status competition, which is increasingly becoming global.
- This competition for influence has become combined with an ideological antagonism that has recently become more focused on the US side.
- Since the United States and China perceive each other as potential military adversaries and plan their operations accordingly, the security dilemma also shapes their relationship.
- The strategic rivalry is particularly pronounced on China's maritime periphery, dominated by military threat perceptions and the US expectation that China intends to establish an exclusive sphere of influence in East Asia.
- Global competition for influence is closely interwoven with the technological dimension of American-Chinese rivalry. It is about dominance in the digital age.
- The risk for international politics is that the intensifying strategic rivalry between the two states condenses into a structural world conflict. This could trigger de-globalization and the emergence of two orders, one under the predominant influence of the United States and the other under China's influence.

For additional overviews see Westad (2019) and Mark (2012).

===== George H. W. Bush administration (1989–1993) =====
Americans who had been optimistic about the emergence of democratic characteristics in response to the rapid economic growth in China were stunned and disappointed by the brutal crackdown of the pro-democratic Tiananmen Square protests in 1989. The U.S. and other governments enacted a number of measures against China's violation of human rights. The US suspended high-level official exchanges with the PRC and weapons exports from the US to the PRC. The US also imposed a number of economic sanctions. The crisis disrupted trade relationships as investors' interest in mainland China dropped dramatically. Tourist traffic fell off sharply. Washington denounced the repression and suspended certain trade and investment programs. Bush himself knew China well as a former chief diplomat stationed there and played a cautious hand so that condemnation would not preclude good ties. For example, he vetoed a sanctions bill passed by Congress.

===== Joe Biden administration (2021–2025) =====
Relations with the new Biden administration in 2021 included heightened tensions over trade, technology and human rights, particularly regarding Hong Kong, and the treatment of minorities in China. In addition, international tensions regarding control of the South China Sea remained high. However, the Biden and Xi administrations agreed to collaborate on long-term projects regarding climate change, nuclear proliferation, and the global COVID-19 pandemic.

==== Winter Olympics 2022 in China ====
China celebrated a "joyless triumph" in games with few spectators because of severe anti-COVID restrictions. There were no disasters but Russian athletes were again embarrassed by a doping scandal, the media coverage was eclipsed by rising war fears in Europe regarding Russia and Ukraine, and growing anxiety about the future of the sporting movement, according to Steven Lee Myers and Kevin Draper. Of the 91 countries participating, Norway and Germany dominated the medal count, followed by the Russian athletes who played regardless of Russia itself being banned for a major doping scandal. Orville Schell, an American expert on China, stated: "Such an august occasion, designed to promote openness, good sportsmanship and transnational solidarity, ended up being a heavily policed, brittle, Potemkin-like simulacrum of the Olympic ideal."

=== Globalization ===
Since World War II, barriers to international trade have been considerably lowered through international agreements – GATT. The Washington Consensus of 1989 set out best practices according to major world agencies. Particular initiatives carried out as a result of GATT and the World Trade Organization (WTO), for which GATT is the foundation, have included:

- Promotion of free trade:
  - Elimination of tariffs; creation of free trade zones with small or no tariffs
  - Reduced transportation costs, especially resulting from development of containerization for ocean shipping.
  - Reduction or elimination of capital controls
  - Reduction, elimination, or harmonization of subsidies for local businesses
  - Creation of subsidies for global corporations
  - Harmonization of intellectual property laws across the majority of states, with more restrictions
  - Supranational recognition of intellectual property restrictions (e.g., patents granted by China would be recognized in the United States)

Cultural globalization, driven by communication technology and the worldwide marketing of Western cultural industries, was understood at first as a process of homogenization, as the global domination of American culture at the expense of traditional diversity. However, a contrasting trend soon became evident in the emergence of movements protesting against globalization and giving new momentum to the defense of local uniqueness, individuality, and identity.

The Uruguay Round (1986 to 1994) led to a treaty to create the WTO to mediate trade disputes and set up a uniform platform of trading. Other bilateral and multilateral trade agreements, including sections of Europe's Maastricht Treaty and the North American Free Trade Agreement (NAFTA) have also been signed in pursuit of the goal of reducing tariffs and barriers to trade.

World exports rose to 16.2% in 2001 from 8.5% in 1970, of total gross world product.

In the 1990s, the growth of low-cost communication networks allowed work done using a computer to be moved to low wage locations for many job types. This included accounting, software development, and engineering design.

World map showing real GDP growth rates for 2009; countries in brown were in a recession.

=== Great economic recession 2007–2009 ===
In 2007–2009, most of the industrialized world was affected by the Great Recession. After 2001 there was a global rise in prices in commodities and housing, marking an end to the commodities recession of 1980–2000. The US mortgage-backed securities, which had risks that were hard to assess, were marketed around the world and a broad-based credit boom fed a global speculative bubble in real estate and equities. The financial situation was also affected by a sharp increase in oil and food prices. The collapse of the American housing bubble caused the values of securities tied to mortgages to plummet thereafter, damaging financial institutions. The Great Recession, a severe economic recession which began in the United States in 2007, was sparked by the 2008 financial crisis. The 2008 financial crisis was linked to earlier lending practices by financial institutions and the trend of securitization of American real estate mortgages. The emergence of Sub-prime loan losses exposed other risky loans and over-inflated asset prices.

The downturn quickly spread to most of the industrialized world and caused a pronounced deceleration of economic activity. The global recession occurred in an economic environment characterized by various imbalances. It caused a sharp drop in international trade, rising unemployment and slumping commodity prices. The recession renewed interest in Keynesian economic ideas on how to combat recessionary conditions. However, various industrial countries continued to undertake austerity policies to cut deficits, reduced spending, as opposed to following Keynesian theories which called for increased spending to bolster demand.

Countries by real GDP growth rate in 2014. (Countries in red were in recession.)

From the late 2009 European sovereign-debt crisis, fears of a sovereign debt crisis developed among investors concerning rising government debt levels across the globe together with a wave of downgrading of government debt of certain European states. Concerns intensified early 2010 and thereafter making it difficult or impossible for sovereigns to re-finance their debts. On May 9, 2010, Europe's Finance Ministers approved a rescue package worth €750 billion aimed at ensuring financial stability across Europe. The European Financial Stability Facility (EFSF) was a special purpose vehicle financed by members of the eurozone to combat the European sovereign debt crisis. In October 2011, Eurozone leaders agreed on another package of measures designed to prevent the collapse of member economies. The three most affected countries, Greece, Ireland and Portugal, collectively account for six percent of Eurozone's gross domestic product (GDP). In 2012, Eurozone finance ministers reached an agreement on a second €130-billion Greek bailout. In 2013, the European Union agreed to a €10 billion economic bailout for Cyprus during the 2012–2013 Cypriot financial crisis.

=== Asia ===
==== 1997 Asian financial crisis ====
The countries most affected by the 1997 Asian financial crisis

Until 1999, Asia attracted almost half of the total capital inflow into developing countries. The economies of Southeast Asia in particular maintained high interest rates attractive to foreign investors looking for a high rate of return. As a result, the region's economies received a large inflow of money and experienced a dramatic run-up in asset prices. At the same time, the regional economies of Thailand, Malaysia, Indonesia, Singapore and South Korea experienced high growth rates, of 8–12% GDP, in the late 1980s and early 1990s. This achievement was widely acclaimed by financial institutions including the IMF and World Bank and was known as part of the "Asian economic miracle".

The Asian financial crisis was a sudden financial crisis that gripped much of East Asia and Southeast Asia beginning in July 1997 and raised fears of a worldwide economic meltdown due to financial contagion. However, the recovery in 1998–1999 was rapid.

The crisis started in Thailand on July 2, 1997, with the financial collapse of the Thai baht after the Thai government was forced to float the baht due to a severe shortage of foreign currency to peg to the U.S. dollar. Capital flight ensued almost immediately, beginning an international chain reaction. At the time, Thailand had acquired a burden of foreign debt. As the crisis spread, most of Southeast Asia and Japan saw slumping currencies, devalued stock markets and other asset prices, and a precipitous rise in private debt.

Indonesia, South Korea, and Thailand were the countries most affected by the crisis. Hong Kong, Laos, Malaysia and the Philippines were also hurt badly. However, China as well as Singapore, Taiwan, and Vietnam were less affected, although all suffered from a loss of demand and confidence throughout the region. Japan was also affected, though less significantly.

Foreign debt-to-GDP ratios rose in most of Asia during the worst of the crisis. In South Korea, the ratios rose from 13% to 21% and then as high as 40%, while the other northern newly industrialized countries fared much better. Only in Thailand and South Korea did debt service-to-exports ratios rise.

The International Monetary Fund (IMF) stepped in to initiate a $40 billion program to stabilize the currencies of South Korea, Thailand, and Indonesia, economies particularly hard hit by the crisis. The efforts to stem a global economic crisis did little to stabilize the domestic situation in Indonesia, however. After 30 years in power, Indonesian President Suharto was forced to step down on May 21, 1998, in the wake of widespread rioting that followed sharp price increases caused by a drastic devaluation of the rupiah. The effects of the crisis lingered through 1998. In 1998, growth in the Philippines dropped to virtually zero. Only Singapore and Taiwan proved relatively insulated from the shock, but both suffered serious hits in passing, the former due to its size and geographical location between Malaysia and Indonesia. By 1999, however, the economies of Asia were recovering rapidly. After the crisis, the affected economies worked toward better financial supervision.

=== Europe ===
Following the end of the Cold War, the European Economic Community pushed for closer integration, co-operation in foreign and home affairs, and started to increase its membership into the neutral and former communist countries. In 1993, the Maastricht Treaty established the European Union, succeeding the EEC and furthering political co-operation. The neutral countries of Austria, Finland and Sweden acceded to the EU, and those that didn't join were tied into the EU's economic market via the European Economic Area. These countries also entered the Schengen Agreement which lifted border controls between member states.The Maastricht Treaty created a single currency for most EU members. The euro was created in 1999 and replaced all previous currencies in participating states in 2002. The most notable exception to the currency union, or eurozone, was the United Kingdom, which also did not sign the Schengen Agreement.

The EU did not participate in the Yugoslav Wars and was divided on supporting the United States in the 2003–2011 Iraq War. NATO has been part of the war in Afghanistan, but at a much lower level of involvement than the United States.

In 2004, the EU gained 10 new members. (Estonia, Latvia, and Lithuania, which had been part of the Soviet Union; Czech Republic, Hungary, Poland, Slovakia, and Slovenia, five former-communist countries; Malta, and the divided island of Cyprus.) These were followed by Bulgaria and Romania in 2007. Russia's regime had interpreted these expansions as violations against NATO's promise to not expand "one inch to the east" in 1990. Russia engaged in a number of bilateral disputes about gas supplies with Belarus and Ukraine which endangered gas supplies to Europe. Russia also engaged in a minor war with Georgia in 2008.

Supported by the United States and some European countries, Kosovo's government unilaterally declared independence from Serbia on February 17, 2008.

Public opinion in the EU turned against enlargement, partially due to what was seen as over-eager expansion including Turkey gaining candidate status. The European Constitution was rejected in France and the Netherlands, and then (as the Treaty of Lisbon) in Ireland, although a second vote passed in Ireland in 2009.

The 2008 financial crisis and the Great Recession affected Europe, and government responded with austerity measures. Limited financial capability of the smaller EU nations (most notably Greece) to handle their debts led to social unrest, government liquidation, and financial insolvency. In May 2010, the German parliament agreed to loan 22.4 billion euros to Greece over three years, with the stipulation that Greece follow strict austerity measures. See European sovereign-debt crisis.

Beginning in 2014, Ukraine has been in a state of revolution and unrest with two breakaway regions (Donetsk and Lugansk) attempting to join Russia as full federal subjects. (See War in Donbas.) On March 16, a referendum was held in Crimea leading to the de facto secession of Crimea and its largely internationally unrecognized annexation to the Russian Federation as the Republic of Crimea.

In June 2016, in a referendum in the United Kingdom on the country's membership in the European Union, 52% of voters voted to leave the EU, leading to the complex Brexit separation process and negotiations, which led to political and economic changes for both the UK and the remaining European Union countries. The UK left the EU on January 31, 2020.

The European Union went through several crises. The European debt crisis caused severe economic problems to several eurozone member states, most severely Greece. The 2015 migration crisis led to several million people entering the EU illegally in a short period of time. Many died at sea. Growing cynicism and distrust of the established parties led to a sharp rise in the 2014 European Parliament Elections in the vote shares of several eurosceptic parties, including the League in Italy, Alternative for Germany, and the Finns Party in Finland.

==== Transatlantic connections ====
Strong ties linked the US and Canada with Britain and Europe. The military alliance of NATO expanded after the end of the Cold War and engaged in wars in the Balkans and Afghanistan. The U.S. and Britain continue to maintain a Special Relationship.

==== Eastern Europe ====
2004–2013 EU enlargements

existing members
new members in 2004
Cyprus
Czech Republic
Estonia
Hungary
Latvia
Lithuania
Malta
Poland
Slovakia
Slovenia

existing members
new members in 2007
Bulgaria
Romania

existing members
new members in 2013
Croatia

With the fall of the Iron Curtain in 1989, the political landscape of the Eastern Bloc, and indeed the world, changed. In the German reunification, the Federal Republic of Germany peacefully absorbed the German Democratic Republic in 1990. In 1991, COMECON, the Warsaw Pact, and the Soviet Union were dissolved. Many European nations that had been part of the Soviet Union regained their independence (Belarus, Moldova, Ukraine, as well as the Baltic States of Latvia, Lithuania, and Estonia). Czechoslovakia peacefully separated into the Czech Republic and Slovakia in 1993. Many countries of this region joined the European Union, namely Bulgaria, the Czech Republic, Croatia, Estonia, Hungary, Latvia, Lithuania, Poland, Romania, Slovakia, and Slovenia. The term "EU11 countries" refer to the Central, Eastern, and Baltic European member states that accessed in 2004 and after: in 2004, the Czech Republic, Estonia, Latvia, Lithuania, Hungary, Poland, Slovenia, and the Slovak Republic; in 2007, Bulgaria, Romania; and in 2013, Croatia.

Generally, they soon encountered the following economic problems: high inflation, high unemployment, low economic growth, and high government debt. By 2000 these economies were stabilized, and between 2004 and 2013 all of them joined the European Union.

==== Russo-Ukrainian War ====
The Russo-Ukrainian War is an ongoing and protracted conflict that started in February 2014, primarily involving Russia and pro-Russian forces on one hand, and Ukraine on the other. The war has centered on the status of Crimea and parts of the Donbas, which are internationally recognized as part of Ukraine. Tensions between Russia and Ukraine erupted especially from 2021 to 2022, when it became apparent that Russia was considering launching a military invasion of Ukraine. In February 2022, the crisis deepened, and diplomatic talks to subdue Russia failed; this culminated in Russia moving forces into the separatist controlled regions on February 22, 2022. After repeated warnings the European Union, Britain, the United States, and Germany denounced the movement as an invasion and imposed sanctions.

=== Terrorism ===
In the 1980s and 1990s, Islamic militancy in pursuit of religious and political goals increased, many militants drawing inspiration from Iran's 1979 Islamic Revolution. In the 1990s, well-known violent acts that targeted civilians were the World Trade Center bombing by Islamic terrorists on February 26, 1993, the Tokyo subway sarin attack by Aum Shinrikyo on March 20, 1995, and the bombing of Oklahoma City's Murrah Federal Building in April 1995. Religion was a main factor in most cases. Special-interest terrorism was use by organized pressure groups of violent action, as in anti-abortion violence and environmental terrorism.

==== Middle East ====
Hezbollah ("Party of God") is an Islamist movement and political party founded in Lebanon in 1985 to achieve an Islamic revolution in Lebanon and the withdrawal of Israeli forces from Lebanon. It carried out missile attacks and suicide bombings against Israeli targets.

Egyptian Islamic Jihad seeks an Islamic state in Egypt. The group was formed in 1980 as an umbrella organization for militant student groups which were formed after the leadership of the Muslim Brotherhood renounced violence. In 1981, it assassinated Egyptian president Anwar Sadat. On November 17, 1997, at the Luxor massacre, it machine-gunned 58 Japanese and European vacationers and four Egyptians.

The first Palestinian suicide attack took place in 1989. In the 1990s, Hamas became well known for suicide bombings. Palestinian militant organizations have been responsible for rocket attacks on Israel, IED attacks, shootings, and stabbings.

==== Asia ====
Aum Shinrikyo, now known as Aleph, is a Japanese religious group and terrorist organization. On June 28, 1994, Aum Shinrikyo members released sarin gas from several sites in Matsumoto, Japan, killing eight and injuring 200 in what became known as the Matsumoto incident. On March 20, 1995, Aum Shinrikyo members released sarin gas in a coordinated attack on five trains in the Tokyo subway system, killing 12 commuters and damaging the health of about 5,000 others in what became known as the subway sarin incident. In May 1995, Asahara and other senior leaders were arrested and the group's membership rapidly decreased.

==== Russia ====
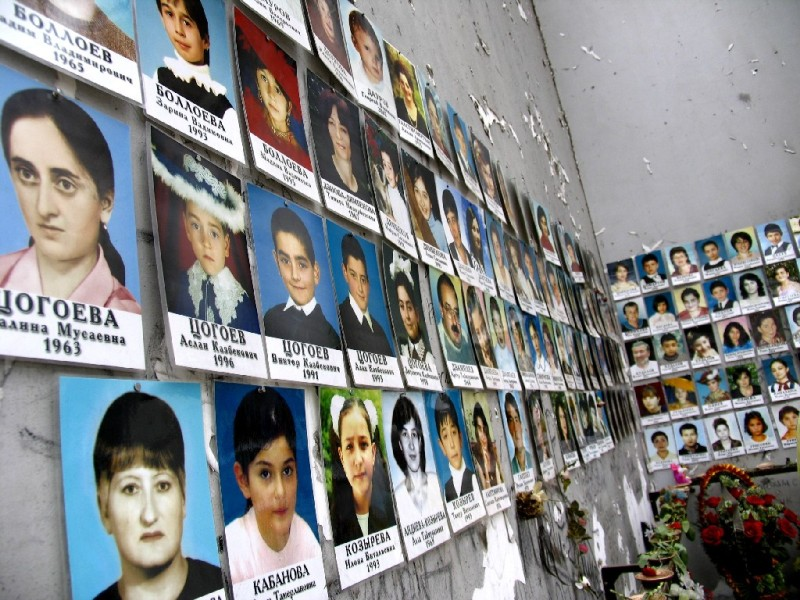
Hostage crisis victim photos, on the walls of the former School Number One

Chechen separatists, led by Shamil Basayev, carried out several attacks on Russian targets between 1994 and 2006. In the June 1995 Budyonnovsk hospital hostage crisis, Basayev-led separatists took over 1,000 civilians hostage in a hospital in the southern Russian city of Budyonnovsk. When Russian special forces attempted to free the hostages, 105 civilians and 25 Russian troops were killed.

==== September 11 attacks ====
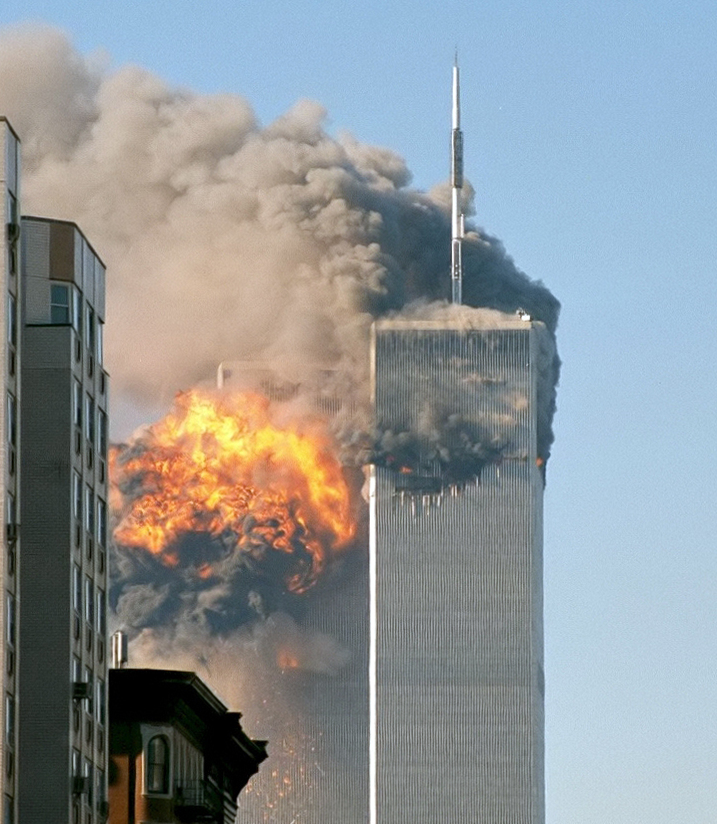
The northeast face of the South Tower of the World Trade Center, after being struck by plane in the south face.

By far, the biggest episode was the September 11, 2001, attack on New York and Washington by al Qaeda. Elsewhere, the Middle East was the main locale for terrorism.

On the morning of September 11, 2001, four airliners were hijacked by 19 members of the terrorist organization al-Qaeda. One struck the North Tower of the World Trade Center in New York City; with a second striking the South Tower, resulting in the collapse of both 110-story skyscrapers, and the destruction of the World Trade Center. The third hijacked plane was crashed into the Pentagon (the headquarters of the United States Department of Defense) outside Washington. The 9/11 attack was the single deadliest international terrorist incident and the most devastating foreign attack on American soil since the Japanese surprise attack on Pearl Harbor on December 7, 1941. The U.S. declared war on terrorism, beginning with an attack on al-Qaeda and its Taliban supporters in Afghanistan, that lasted into 2021.

Other major episodes include the 2002 Moscow theater hostage crisis, the 2003 Istanbul bombings, the 2004 Madrid train bombings, the 2004 Beslan school hostage crisis, the 2005 London bombings, the 2005 New Delhi bombings, the 2007 Yazidi communities bombings, the 2008 Mumbai Hotel Siege, the 2009 Makombo massacre, the 2011 Norway attacks, the 2013 Iraq attacks, the 2014 Camp Speicher massacre, the 2014 Gamboru Ngala attack, the 2015 Paris attacks, the 2016 Karrada bombing, the 2016 Mosul massacre, the 2016 Hamam al-Alil massacre, the 2017 Mogadishu bombings, and the 2017 Sinai attack.

In the 21st century, most victims of terrorist attacks have been killed in Iraq, Afghanistan, Nigeria, Syria, Pakistan, India, Somalia, or Yemen.

=== Peace and warfare ===
Michael Mandelbaum explains that the 25 years after 1989 were peaceful for three basic reasons. The collapse of the USSR enabled the "liberal hegemony" of the United States, working closely with NATO and other allies. Secondly democracy grew rapidly and as the "democratic peace theory" states, democracies rarely fight each other. Finally, globalization caused prosperity and interdependence.

What warfare did exist from 1990 to 2002 involved civil wars. They include the Somali Civil War (ongoing) and the Second Congo War in Africa, the Yugoslav Wars in Europe, the Tajikistani Civil War in Asia, and the Cenepa War in South America. From 2003 onward they include War in Darfur; Iraq War; Kivu conflict in Congo; Libyan Civil War (2011); Syrian civil war since 2011; War in Iraq (2013–2017); the Russo-Ukrainian War since 2014; International military intervention against ISIL in Iraq since 2014; and Yemeni Civil War (2014–present).

==== Afghanistan ====
The Northern Alliance and NATO-led ISAF invaded Afghanistan on October 7, 2001, and overthrew the Al-Qaeda-supportive Taliban government. Troops remained to install a democratic government, fight a slowly escalating insurgency, and to hunt for Al-Qaeda leader Osama bin Laden who was killed by American troops 10 years later, on May 2, 2011. On December 31, 2016, NATO forces officially ended combat operations in Afghanistan. On August 15, 2021, the Taliban took control of Afghanistan again. All NATO forces left on August 31, 2021.

==== Russian invasion of Ukraine ====
On February 21, 2022, Russia officially recognized the two self-proclaimed separatist states in the Donbas, and openly sent troops into the territories. On February 24, 2022, Russia invaded Ukraine in a major escalation of the Russo-Ukrainian War that began in 2014. The invasion caused Europe's largest refugee crisis since World War II, with more than 6.4 million Ukrainians fleeing the country and a third of the population displaced. The invasion also caused global food shortages, and oil shortages in Europe.

Led by NATO, the European Community, and the United States, much of the international community has heavily condemned Russia, accusing it of breaking international law and grossly violating Ukrainian sovereignty. Many countries implemented cultural, business, and financial sanctions against Russia, Russian individuals, and Russian companies. Many corporations and organizations ended their relations with Russia, especially regarding high technology and the arts. NATO countries sharply cut their imports of Russian oil and gas, preparing for a complete cutoff. After Russian President Vladimir Putin silenced opposition, many dissenters fled Russia. Volodymyr Zelenskyy, Ukraine's president, became an international icon for leading the resistance.

==== Second Cold War ====
The elevated geopolitical tensions in the 21st century between some democracies including United States and some authoritarian regimes including Russia and China are also described as Second Cold War.

== See also ==
- Contemporary history
- Cyberwarfare
- Foreign relations of Russia
- List of modern conflicts in the Middle East
- List of modern conflicts in North Africa
- List of wars: 1990–2002
- History of Russia (1991–present)
- Trade war
- World War III

== Works cited ==
- Brown, Archie (2009). The rise and fall of communism. Random House. ISBN 9780224078795.
- Brügger, Niels, ed. (2017). Web25: Histories from the first 25 years of the world wide web. Peter Lang. doi:10.3726/b11492. ISBN 978-1-4331-4065-5.
- Friedlingstein, Pierre; Jones, Matthew W.; O'Sullivan, Michael; Andrew, Robbie M.; et al. (2019). "Global Carbon Budget 2019". Earth System Science Data. 11 (4): 1783–1838. Bibcode:2019ESSD...11.1783F. doi:10.5194/essd-11-1783-2019. hdl:10871/39943. ISSN 1866-3508.
- Gertler, Mark; Gilchrist, Simon (2018). "What happened: Financial factors in the great recession". Journal of Economic Perspectives. 32 (3): 3–30. doi:10.1257/jep.32.3.3.
- Osterhammel, Jurgen; Petersson, Niels P. (2005). Globalization: a short history. Translated by Geyer, Dona. Princeton University Press. doi:10.2307/j.ctv1n9dkpf. ISBN 978-0-691-12165-9. JSTOR j.ctv1n9dkpf.
- Priestland, David (2009). The Red Flag: Communism and the making of the modern world. Penguin UK.
- Service, Robert (2007). Comrades! A History of World Communism. Harvard University Press.
- Rudolph, Peter (February 2020). The Sino-American World Conflict (Report). SWP Research Paper. Vol. 3. German Institute for International and Security Affairs. doi:10.18449/2020RP03.
- Sherman, Wendy R. (September–October 2018). "How We Got the Iran Deal: And Why We'll Miss It". Foreign Affairs. Vol. 97, no. 5. pp. 186–197.
- Stiglitz, Joseph E. (2004). The roaring nineties: A new history of the world's most prosperous decade. Norton.
