= Battle of Gamboru Ngala (2015) =

- Part of Boko Haram insurgency
Date	31 January – 3 February 2015
Location	Gamboru Ngala, Borno State, Nigeria
Result	Chadian victory
Territorial changes	Gamboru Ngala comes under Chadian control

Belligerents
Chad; Cameroon	Boko Haram

Strength
2,000	Unknown

Casualties and losses
9 dead, 21 wounded	~400 killed

Between 31 January and 3 February 2015, Chadian and Cameroonian soldiers liberated the Nigerian border town of Gamboru Ngala from Boko Haram, after several months of occupation by the group.

== Background ==
Boko Haram emerged in 2009 as a jihadist social and political movement in a failed rebellion in northeast Nigeria. Throughout the following years, Abubakar Shekau unified militant Islamist groups in the region and continued to foment the rebellion against the Nigerian government, conducting terrorist attacks and bombings in cities and communities across the region.

On 14 January 2015, following a meeting between the Cameroonian Minister of Defense and Chadian President Idriss Déby, the Chadian government announced it would send troops to northern Cameroon to defend against Boko Haram attacks. By 28 January, Chadian soldiers had deployed to Fotokol, a border town separated from the Boko Haram-controlled Nigerian border town of Gamboru Ngala. Chadian soldiers defended Cameroon in the battle of Bodo shortly after deployment, killing hundreds of Boko Haram fighters.

Since the fall of Gamboru Ngala in the autumn of 2014, the Cameroonian town of Fotokol has seen many attacks by Boko Haram from Gamboru Ngala. Gamboru Ngala and Fotokol are separated by a 500 meter long bridge, and at the time of the battle, Gamboru Ngala on the Nigerian side was controlled by Boko Haram, and Fotokol was controlled by Cameroonian and Chadian forces.

== Battle ==
Chadian forces bombarded Gamboru Ngala on 31 January with two Sukhoi Su-25 aircraft and two Mi-24 helicopters. Cameroonian artillery based in Fotokol also bombarded the town. Chadian troops first entered the town on 1 February. The Chadian army invoked the "right to pursuit", and the Nigerian government approved the intervention of Chadian troops on Nigerian soil, although it was reluctant to do so right before presidential elections. Late in the morning of 3 February, 2,000 Chadian troops crossed the border into Nigeria. he Cameroonian troops remained in Fotokol. After an hour of fighting, the Boko Haram militants fled the town. The town had been abandoned by residents for months, and there was almost no one in it when Chadian troops regained control.

On 4 February, the Chadian government reported nine soldiers dead and 21 wounded. Chadian general Ahmat Darry Bazine said that his troops killed 175 to 200 jihadists. The Chadian government later said that more than 200 jihadists were killed on 3 February alone.
