= Second Battle of Dikwa =

- Part of Boko Haram insurgency
Date	March 2, 2015
Location	Dikwa, Borno State, Nigeria
Result	Chadian victory: Dikwa returned to Nigeria
Territorial changes	Dikwa recaptured by Chad, returned to Nigeria

Belligerents
Chad	Boko Haram

Commanders and leaders
Unknown	Abubakar Shekau

Strength
2,500	Unknown

Casualties and losses
1 killed 34 injured	~100 killed

On March 2, 2015, Chadian forces recaptured the town of Dikwa, Borno State, Nigeria from Boko Haram. The battle occurred two weeks after the first battle of Dikwa, where Chadian soldiers eliminated a major Boko Haram camp on the way to Dikwa, opening up the road for the Chadians to enter the city.

== Background ==
Boko Haram emerged in 2009 as a jihadist social and political movement in a failed rebellion in northeast Nigeria. Throughout the following years, Abubakar Shekau unified militant Islamist groups in the region and continued to foment the rebellion against the Nigerian government, conducting terrorist attacks and bombings in cities and communities across the region.

On January 14, 2015, following a meeting between the Cameroonian Minister of Defense and Chadian President Idriss Déby, the Chadian government announced it would send troops to northern Cameroon to defend against Boko Haram attacks. By January 28, Chadian soldiers had deployed to Fotokol, a border town separated from the Boko Haram-controlled Nigerian border town of Gamboru Ngala, eventually entering and recapturing Gamboru Ngala a few days later after the Nigerian government authorized the Chadians to fight in Nigeria. In late February, Chadian soldiers ambushed Boko Haram at a camp near Dikwa, destroying the camp and killing hundreds of soldiers. This defeat allowed Chadian troops to have open access to entering Dikwa. About 2,500 Chadian soldiers were in Borno State prior to the battle.

== Battle ==
On March 2, 2015, Chadian troops entered Dikwa after an hour of fighting. Fighting was concentrated on a large villa used by Boko Haram near the entrance of the town. After seizing the villa, the Chadians captured the town street by street, gradually taking control of Dikwa. After securing the town and it's outskirts, the Chadian soldiers encamped on a plain just outside Dikwa.

The Chadian government said that one soldier was killed and 34 were injured. Most of these injuries were reportedly caused by the explosion of a suicide bomber in a car carrying explosives. The Chadian government also said that around 100 Boko Haram fighters were killed. According to Chadian president Idriss Déby, the leader of Boko Haram Abubakar Shekau was present in Dikwa at the time of the battle and fled during the commotion.

== Aftermath ==
Following the battle, the Nigerian government asked the Chadian army to leave Dikwa so Nigerian soldiers could regain control of the town. The Chadians returned to Cameroon on March 12.
