= Battle of Wurge =

- Part of Boko Haram insurgency
Date	February 24, 2015
Location	Wurge, Borno State, Nigeria
Result	Chadian victory

Belligerents
Chad	Boko Haram

Casualties and losses
1 killed 9 wounded	207+ killed 2+ (POW)

On February 24, 2015, Chadian forces and Boko Haram clashed in Wurge, Borno State, Nigeria, during a failed Boko Haram offensive on Gamboru Ngala.

== Background ==
Boko Haram emerged in 2009 as a jihadist social and political movement in a failed rebellion in northeast Nigeria. Throughout the following years, Abubakar Shekau unified militant Islamist groups in the region and continued to foment the rebellion against the Nigerian government, conducting terrorist attacks and bombings in cities and communities across the region.

On January 14, 2015, following a meeting between the Cameroonian Minister of Defense and Chadian President Idriss Déby, the Chadian government announced it would send troops to northern Cameroon to defend against Boko Haram attacks. By January 28, Chadian soldiers had deployed to Fotokol, a border town separated from the Boko Haram-controlled Nigerian border town of Gamboru Ngala. In late January, they then successfully recaptured Gamboru Ngala from Boko Haram, and Nigeria allowed the Chadian government to conduct operations in Nigeria, and later pushed towards Dikwa. About 2,500 Chadian soldiers were in Borno State prior to the battle.

== Battle ==
On February 24, Boko Haram launched a new offensive towards Chadian-controlled Gamboru Ngala. The Chadians were notified of the attack in advance thanks to informants. Chadian soldiers headed towards the Boko Haram militants to ambush them. The militants, once they met up with the Chadians, were surprised and tried to turn around. The Chadian forces pursued them for about twenty kilometers and caught up with them in the village of Wurge, in a forested area. The town was stormed by the Chadian troops and the local Boko Haram command center was destroyed.

According to the Chadian government, one Chadian soldier was killed and nine were wounded. Seven were wounded as a result of a vehicle crashing during the pursuit. The Chadian government said that upwards of 207 militants were killed during the battle. At least two jihadists were taken prisoner. Thirteen pick-up trucks and dozens of motorcycles used by Boko Haram were destroyed.
