= 2013 attack on Bama =

Battle in northwest Nigeria

2013 Bama attack
- Part of Boko Haram insurgency
Date	7 May 2013
Location	Bama, Nigeria
Result	Boko Haram victory

Belligerents
Nigeria	Boko Haram

Strength
Unknown	200 fighters 18 vehicles

Casualties and losses
38 killed	13 killed 2 POWs
- 4 civilians killed 105 prisoners freed

On 7 May 2013, Boko Haram militants attacked the town of Bama, Nigeria, killing 38 Nigerian soldiers and freeing over a hundred Boko Haram militants.

== Background ==
Boko Haram emerged in 2009 as a jihadist social and political movement in a failed rebellion in northeast Nigeria. Throughout the following years, Abubakar Shekau unified militant Islamist groups in the region and continued to foment the rebellion against the Nigerian government, conducting terrorist attacks and bombings in cities and communities across the region. Slightly over a week before the Bama ambush, Nigerian forces defeated Boko Haram militants in Gashua.

== Attack on Bama ==
At 5am on 7 May, around the time of fajr, 200 Boko Haram fighters transported by 18 buses with anti-aircraft weapons and Hiluxes arrived in Bama. The jihadists attacked a military barracks, a police barracks, a prison, a mobile post, a police station, and a clinic. The army base and police station were targeted first. The attack on the army-held barracks was repelled, with about ten attackers killed and two taken prisoner. The Islamists managed to enter the prison, however, where they killed all the guards they encountered and freed 150 prisoners. The fighting at the police barracks was also very deadly, with the building's defenders attacked with grenades and numerous vehicles set on fire. Survivors of the attack stated that the Boko Haram militants donned Nigerian army uniforms, but these disguises were seen through.

== Aftermath ==
22 policemen, 14 guards, two soldiers, and four civilians were killed by the attackers. Thirteen militants were killed.

In December 2013, Boko Haram militants again attacked Bama, targeting the military barracks. Many of the civilians in Bama did not return following Boko Haram's seizure of the city, even after the Nigerian army recaptured it in 2015. In 2018, much of Bama was a ghost town.
