= Second Battle of Bama =

- Part of Boko Haram insurgency
Date	20 December 2013
Location	Bama, Borno State, Nigeria
Result	Nigerian victory

Belligerents
Nigeria	Boko Haram

Casualties and losses
15 killed	63 killed Many injured
- 5 civilians killed (per Nigeria); Many civilians killed, several kidnapped (per residents)

On 20 December 2013, jihadists from Boko Haram attacked the city of Bama for the second time that year, following the First Battle of Bama in May.

== Background ==
Boko Haram emerged in 2009 as a jihadist social and political movement in a failed rebellion in northeast Nigeria. Throughout the following years, Abubakar Shekau unified militant Islamist groups in the region and continued to foment the rebellion against the Nigerian government, conducting terrorist attacks and bombings in cities and communities across the region. In May 2013, Boko Haram militants stormed the city, killing 38 Nigerian soldiers, freeing 105 prisoners, and sparking a battle for the city.

== Battle ==
At dawn on 20 December, Boko Haram militants entered Bama and stormed the Nigerian Army's Mohammed Kur camp in the city. The attackers set fire to the camp before retreating, taking several soldiers, women, and children as prisoners. Nigerian forces launched a counterattack against the jihadists later that day, with the air force carrying out several bombing raids. According to a resident's testimony, the villages of Awaram, Ali-Ali, Suwabara, and Kashimri were all destroyed.

Nigerian army spokesman Chris Olukade said that while many militants were able to escape with bullet wounds, over 50 militants were killed in the clashes with Nigerian forces. Later this number increased to 63 killed. Olukade said that 15 Nigerian soldiers were killed along with five civilians. However, resident testimony reported many more civilians were killed, with a local leader saying "We have never seen so many deaths."

The militants fled towards the Cameroonian border, but many were intercepted by Nigerian planes from Maiduguri.
