= 2020 Gamboru bombing =

2020 terrorist attack in Nigeria

- Location: Gamboru, Borno State, Nigeria
- Date: 6 January 2020
- Target: Civilians
- Weapon: Suicide bombing (disputed)
- Deaths: 38
- Injuries: 30

At about 5pm on 6 January 2020, a bomb exploded at a market in Gamboru, Borno State, northeastern Nigeria. The market is located on a bridge which connects Gamboru to Fotokol, Logone-et-Chari, Far North Region, Cameroon. The bombing killed 38 people and injured over 35 others. No group claimed responsibility. Boko Haram often carry out attacks in the region, their insurgency having caused over 35,000 deaths since it began in 2009.
