= Mass executions in Islamic State-occupied Mosul =

Mass executions in Iraq

- Part of the War in Iraq (2013–2017)
- Mass executions in Islamic State-occupied Mosul (Iraq) Location of Mosul, Iraq.
- Location: Mosul, Nineveh Governorate, Iraq
- Date: 10 June 2014 – 10 July 2017
- Target: Mosul residents, enemy soldiers, disloyal Islamic State members, offenders, others
- Attack type: Mass executions, mass murder, mass shooting, war crimes
- Weapons: Guns, drowning, electrocution, other methods
- Deaths: Approx. 7,000
- Injuries: Unknown
- Perpetrator: Islamic State

This article lists the mass executions in Islamic State-occupied Mosul. Mosul, which is located in the Nineveh Governorate of Iraq, was occupied by the Islamic State (IS) from the Fall of Mosul on June 10, 2014, until the liberation of Mosul on July 10, 2017. Mosul is the second largest city in Iraq, and because of this, it was one of the Islamic State's largest bases, and their capture of the city was used in propaganda to demonstrate their military strength. Sunni Islam is the majority religion in the area. Mass executions of civilians, enemy soldiers, and members of IS who were accused of offenses were a regular occurrence, and executions peaked during the Mosul offensive. Mosul was the site of many of IS's war crimes. This article is a timeline of recorded mass executions carried out by IS in and around Mosul.

== Timeline ==
=== 2014 ===
- 10 June: Up to 750 Shia prison inmates were executed by firing squad, with 15 survivors.
- 39 Indian migrant workers were killed by IS in June 2014 after the fall of Mosul, with one survivor escaping. Indian foreign minister, Sushma Swaraj confirmed that they were killed in March 2018 and the physical remains of the dead were repatriated by the Indian government.

=== 2015 ===
- 6 January: 20 young men were executed for multiple alleged crimes, and three female lawyers were executed.
- 7 January: Five kidnapped Iraqi Army members were executed, including two colonels.
- 19 January: 13 teenagers were executed for "watching a soccer match", also two men were "flung off a tower" for "engaging in homosexual activities".
- 2 May: 600 Yazidi hostages were executed.
- 30 June: A top IS administrative official was executed for "planning a coup".
- 12 July: 10 former Iraqi military officers were executed on "espionage allegations". Iraqi Parliament candidate Ebrahim Saleh was also executed.
- 6 August: 19 women were executed for "refusing to have sex with fighters".
- 9 August: Around 2000 civilians were executed, after they were accused of "being apostates given their jobs at the police".
- 25 September: Three academics were executed from the College of Education at the University of Mosul.
- 31 October: Rudaw reported that 12 or more boys aged 12-16 were executed after being "caught trying to escape".
- 15 December: Three imams and one teacher were executed for convincing youth not to join IS.

=== 2016 ===
- 8 February: Islamic State executed over 300 police and army personnel, as well as civil activists by a firing squad in Mosul, Iraq.
- 29 March: An IS member beheaded an element of the Peshmerga in Mosul.
- 21 April: Islamic State executed two of its elements and three civilians by throwing them from the top of a high building in the area of Bab al-Tub in central Mosul for "homosexuality".
- 21 April: At least 250 Iraqi women were executed by Islamic State fighters because they refused forced concubinage with fighters.
- 27 April: IS drowned 7 civilians in metal cages.
- 3 May: 17 people were executed for "refusing to fight Iraqi forces".
- 5 May: 200 people were arrested and 25 executed for "escaping from the battles".
- 11 May: Five civilians were executed for "apostasy".
- 13 May: Five people were executed for "spying".
- 16 May: A woman and 20 youths were stoned to death for "having illegal relations".
- 18 May: 25 people were executed with nitric acid for "spying" and other reasons.
- 1 June: Six men are executed by the caliphate for selling cigarettes, and three young men are forced to their knees and shot in the back of the head. 13 Iraqi Army weapons experts and officers were also executed by IS for refusing to work with them.
- 3 June: IS burned 19 Yazidi girls after they refused to have sex with their captors.
- 5 June : 3 civilians were beheaded. They were charged with working with the Iraqi government and Peshmerga forces.
- 6 June: IS executed 11 civilians for trying to flee IS controlled areas. IS also executed around 65 civilians and arrested around 90 in Mosul.
- 7 June: 5 displaced civilians were killed after IS put an IED near them.
- 9 June: A woman was stoned to death on charges of "adultery".
- 18 June: 3 escaping civilians were kidnapped and executed by firing squads after attempting to flee IS.
- 14 July: A mass execution by IS included 22 police members and 5 members of Peshmerga.
- 16 July: Islamic State burned 5 civilians alive in a cage for allegedly spying and working with the Iraqi security forces.
- 19 July: 12 protesting civilians were shot dead by Islamic State. In retaliation, Iraqi soldiers killed 20 Islamic State members.
- 20 July: Islamic State militants executed 33 civilians near Qayyarah.
- 25 July: Islamic State executed 23 people for allegedly working with Iraqi forces.
- 28 July: Islamic State executed 14 civilians who were attempting to flee the city.
- 11 August: A man executed his father for assisting his family in escaping.
- 16 August: IS executed 6 people using molten tar after being 'accused' of cooperating with enemies of IS, and another person for "dressing like a woman" in another in a series of executions.
- 17 August: IS executed 7 people for refusing to send their children to schools run by IS.
- 20 August: IS executed 14 civilians for allegedly cooperating with government and Kurdish Peshmerga forces.
- 21 August: IS executed 4 people for "homosexuality and sodomy" by throwing them off of a building. 30 policemen were also tortured and killed by assailants in a village that was held by IS.
- 27 August: IS executed 15 people, and recorded it on video. Among the 15 executed were five Kurdish men from Rojava who were shot dead by five child soldiers of multiple nationalities.
- 3 September: Islamic State executed 17 of its members for fleeing a gun battle.
- 12 September: Islamic State members executed eight civilians by drowning them in a metal cage.
- 15 September: A woman in Sharqat was killed by the Islamic State after she hurled stones at the members of the outfit as they had killed her only son right in front of her eyes. The lady, her son and few others were trying to escape from Sharqat when they came face-to-face with Islamic State militants.
- 20 September: IS closed all of the internet cafes in Mosul, and executed five employees for allegedly working with Iraqi forces, a part of their effort to cut off internet connection from areas under their control. They also stoned a woman to death for "fornication". They later executed six youths for "belonging to a resistance faction" using "welding tools". A video also showed at least six people being executed by IS, and another man being shot dead in the head by a young boy.
- 24 September: Islamic State executed 25 civilians for allegedly cooperating with Iraqi security forces.
- 26 September: 11 children were injured by an unknown explosion and gas release.
- 14 October: Islamic State drowned 58 people suspected of taking part in a rebellion plot against it.
- 21 October: Islamic State executed hundreds of men and boys (284+) in Mosul, in the midst of a major offensive by Iraqi forces to recapture the city.
- 24 October: Islamic State executed at least seven of its own militants, after their reported desertion and fleeing the battle fronts.
- 25 October: Islamic State killing 50 former Iraqi police officers they had been holding in a building outside Mosul, and in the village of Safina fighters killing 15 civilians and throwing their bodies in a river. Also, 70 bodies were found in an area south of Mosul.
- 26 October: Islamic State executed 190 former members of the Iraqi security forces for refusing to join them. A further 42 people were executed in a village south of Mosul.
- 29 October: Islamic State executed 100 civilians "for collaborating with the security forces" after executing 22 people by electrocution for the same reasons.
- 31 October: Islamic State executed 300 civilians "for collaborating with the security forces". Islamic State also executed at least fifty of its own militants, after their reported desertion and fleeing the battle fronts.
- 2 November: The Islamic State militants shoot dead 52 people in a public school located in the east of the city of Mosul, a day after Iraqi troops entered the city on the eastern front.
- 8 November: Islamic State killed at least 300 civilians in retaliation against individuals that refused to fight for IS.
- 10 November: Islamic State electrocuted 30 civilians to death, executed three suicide bombers, and shot dead a family of six.
- 11 November: Islamic State has executed 40 civilians in Mosul. Islamic State has also announced it has beheaded six of its own fighters for deserting the battlefield. The Islamic State shot dead 40 civilians before crucifying them for "treason", and killed 20 more for "leaking information". They also shot dead a man for using a mobile phone, and hanged six civilians for "keeping hidden SIM cards".
- 12 November: Islamic State executed 60 civilians.
- 15 November: Islamic State has summarily killed 21 civilians in Mosul it accused of collaborating with U.S.-backed security forces.
- 5 December: Islamic State executed 11 people, including a whole family, for trying to flee its areas.
- 14 December: 41 people were executed, including a journalist.

=== 2017 ===
- 10 February: 12 IS militant fighters were executed by beheadings for trying to flee in the Zanjabili neighbourhood in western Mosul.
- 6 March: Islamic State militants executed 43 people including 8 of its members in western Mosul.
- 24 March: Islamic State members arrested 20 civilians, including 9 women, and executed them while they were trying to flee from al-Yarmouk area toward the recently liberated Mosul al-Jadida district.
- 30 March: Islamic State firing squad execute 23 civilians at Zanjili district in central Mosul for refusing to evacuate homes and move to other districts with the militants.
- 4 April: Islamic State militants have executed 106 civilians for attempting to flee areas under their control in western Mosul since 31 March, according to security sources and a human rights group.
- 7 April: The Iraqi Kurdistan Security Council say that Islamic State executed 140 civilians who were trying to flee Mosul on 3 and 4 April 2017.
- 22 April: Islamic State militants killed 15 civilians in western Mosul for refusing to allow IS snipers to position or erect rocket launchers above their residences. Militants also executed 42 men in Mosul refusing to join IS, a parliamentary source from Nineveh province said.
- 29 to 30 April: Islamic State executed 51 civilians in the areas under its control in Islah Zira’i and Rifa’i neighborhoods of western Mosul.
- 1 May: Islamic State militants executed ten civilians for attempting to flee 17 Tamuz district, which is under their control in western Mosul.
- 14 May: Iraqi Observatory for Human Rights said that IS militants killed 64 civilians, including women and children, who were trying to flee battles in western Mosul.
- 23 May: Seven IS members were executed for trying to escape from battlefields in al-Mekkawi and al-Shifaa areas of central Mosul.
- 24 May: Militants executed 13 Iraqi civilians at the Sargakhana crossing in central Mosul for trying to flee.

== See also ==
- 2014 killing of Indian migrants in Mosul, during the mass executions
- Killing of captives by the Islamic State
- Islamic State beheading incidents
- List of Islamist terrorist attacks
- List of terrorist incidents in Iraq
