= Ngala General Hospital =

Geography
- Location: Ngala, Borno State, Nigeria

Links
- Lists: Hospitals in Nigeria

The Ngala General Hospital is a government established hospital located in Ngala Local Government Area of Borno State, Nigeria. It provides medical and health care services to the community. It was established in 2020, and operates on 24hrs basis.

== Description ==
The Ngala General Hospital was licensed by the Nigeria Ministry of Health with a facility code 08/25/1/2/1/0001 and registered as Secondary Health Care Centre.
