= Hamam al-Alil massacre =

ISIL civilian massacre, 2016

Coordinates: 36.157365°N 43.241365°E

- Part of the War in Iraq (2013–2017)
- Location: Mosul District, Nineveh Governorate, Iraq
- Date: 28 October – 7 November 2016
- Target: Civilian dissidents
- Attack type: Mass murder
- Deaths: 300+
- Perpetrator: Islamic State
- Motive: Retaliation against individuals that refused to fight for ISIL

The Hamam al-Alil massacre (Arabic: مجزرة حمام العليل) was the killing of at least 300 civilians in the town of Hamam al-Alil in Iraq's Nineveh Governorate by the Islamic State of Iraq and the Levant (ISIL) in late October and early November 2016. The event took place within a larger ongoing assault on the city of Mosul by a wide coalition of anti-ISIL forces, which managed to capture Hamam al-Alil on 7 November.

== Background ==
The Battle of Mosul began on 16 October 2016 with forces besieging ISIL-controlled areas in the Nineveh Governorate surrounding Mosul.

== Massacre and recapture of town ==
By October 29, the town of Hamam al-Alil was "almost 90% surrounded" as Iraqi security forces and federal police continued their push northward to Mosul. News reports suggested at least 42 civilians were killed by ISIS in the town the day before, and numerous more taken north to serve as human shields in the upcoming offensive.

On November 4, the UN High Commissioner for Refugees announced that ISIS was instructing residents of the town to hand over boys aged 9 and older, apparently to fight for the group. Around 150 families from Hamam al-Alil were reportedly moved to Mosul itself. The Commissioner's office estimated that as many as 1,600 civilians may have been forcibly moved from Hamam al-Alil to Tal Afar earlier in the week, and could be transferred even further west into Syria. Prior to the 2014 ISIS offensive, the town and surrounding villages were home to around 65,000 people.

By the next day the town was under direct attack from Iraqi forces, with militants using previously planted landmines and bombs to stop their advance. Military reinforcements were sent to the area to help counter the attacks, including aerial support by Iraqi planes and attack helicopters. On November 6, the government offensive succeeded in breaching through to the city center, as the Iraqi forces estimated at least 70 IS fighters, mostly foreign, were left to defend the town. Some militants attempted to escape across the river, while Iraqi troops and police managed to prevent three attempted suicide car bombings.

Shortly after Hamam al-Alil was declared fully liberated on November 7, Iraq's military announced it had discovered around 100 beheaded bodies in the College of Agriculture and Forestry (part of the University of Mosul), on the southern outskirts of town. It was not immediately known if those included the 42 reported killed previously, or if they constituted a separate mass killing.

== Aftermath ==
After government forces pushed out ISIS on 7 November, locals expressed their joy that the group's reign of terror had been brought to an end, with many re-opening their shops or taking the opportunity to bathe in the town's sulfur springs. Officials with the federal police said they will focus on clearing operations around Hamam al-Alil before proceeding north toward Mosul.

== See also ==
- Camp Speicher massacre
- Sinjar massacre
- 2016 Mosul massacre
- Timeline of the War in Iraq (2016)
- Genocide of Yazidis by ISIL
- List of terrorist incidents, 2016
- Mass executions in Islamic State-occupied Mosul
