= Karidjo Mahamadou =

Nigerien politician (1953–2025)

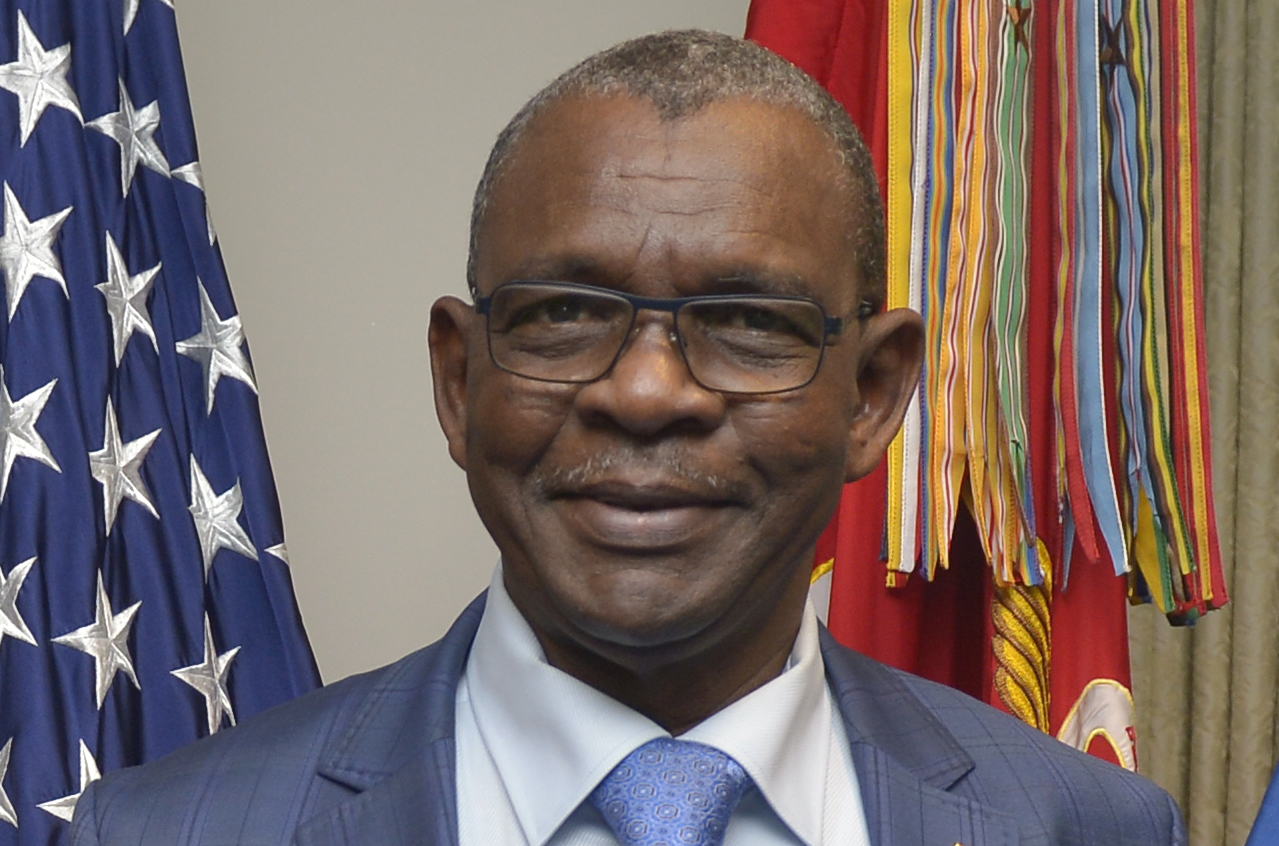
Karidjo Mahamadou (2015)

Karidjo Mahamadou (11 September 1953 – 20 August 2025) was a Nigerien politician. A leading member of the Nigerien Party for Democracy and Socialism (PNDS-Tarayya), he served in the government of Niger as Minister of National Defense from 2011 to 2016. He was President of the High Court of Justice from 2016.

== Life and career ==
Mahamadou was born on 11 September 1953. A teacher by profession, Mahamadou was a founding member of the PNDS; when the party held its Constitutive General Assembly on 23–24 December 1990, he was designated as First Deputy Secretary for Organization. He was elected to the National Assembly of Niger as a PNDS candidate in the February 1993 parliamentary election. In the period that followed, he served for a time as Prefect of Maradi.

At the Fourth Ordinary Congress of the PNDS, held on 4–5 September 2004, Mahamadou was elected as its Fourth Deputy Secretary-General. He retained that post at the Fifth Ordinary Congress, held on 18 July 2009.

After PNDS President Mahamadou Issoufou won the January–March 2011 presidential election and took office as President of Niger, Karidjo Mahamadou was appointed to the government as Minister of National Defense on 21 April 2011. He took over the ministry from Mamadou Ousseini at a handover ceremony on 26 April 2011.

He was elected to the National Assembly in the February 2016 parliamentary election. After Issoufou was sworn in for a second term, Hassoumi Massaoudou was appointed to replace Karidjo Mahamadou as Minister of National Defense on 11 April 2016.

As a Deputy in the National Assembly, Mahamadou was one of four deputies elected to the seven-member High Court of Justice and sworn in on 28 May 2016; he was also elected as President of the Court.

Mahamadou died on 20 August 2025, at the age of 71.
