= 2016 Mosul massacre =

Execution of over 300 police, army personnel, and others in Iraq

- Part of Iraqi Civil War (2014–2017)
- Location: Mosul, Iraq
- Date: 7 February 2016 (UTC+3)
- Attack type: Execution, Mass murder, Firing squad
- Deaths: 300
- Perpetrator: Islamic State

On 7 February 2016, the Islamic State executed over 300 police and army personnel, as well as civil activists by firing squad in Mosul, Iraq.

== See also ==
- List of terrorist incidents, January–June 2016
- Mass executions in Islamic State-occupied Mosul
