= Battle of Bodo =

- Part of Boko Haram insurgency
| Date | January 29–30, 2015 |
| Location | Bodo, Far North Region, Cameroon |
| Result | Chadian victory |

Belligerents
| Chad | Boko Haram |

Casualties and losses
| 4 killed 11 injured | 123 killed (per Chad) |
- 2 civilians killed

On January 30, 2015, militants from Boko Haram attacked the town of Bodo, Far North Region, Cameroon, in an unsuccessful attack that left over 100 militants dead. The battle was the first skirmish between Chadian soldiers and Boko Haram in Cameroon.

== Background ==
Boko Haram emerged in 2009 as a jihadist social and political movement in a failed rebellion in northeast Nigeria. Throughout the following years, Abubakar Shekau unified militant Islamist groups in the region and continued to foment the rebellion against the Nigerian government, conducting terrorist attacks and bombings in cities and communities across the region.

In late 2014, Boko Haram was continuing an offensive into Cameroonian territory from Nigeria. On December 18, Boko Haram attacked and briefly seized the city of Amchide, in Mayo-Tsanaga. The attack was repelled, and hundreds of militants were killed. Similar attacks occurred on December 28, in various communities around Achigachia. On January 12, another attack was repulsed in Kolofata.

On January 14, following a meeting between the Cameroonian Minister of Defense and Chadian President Idriss Déby, the Chadian government announced it would send troops to northern Cameroon to defend against Boko Haram attacks. By January 28, Chadian soldiers had deployed to Fotokol, a border town separated from the Boko Haram-controlled Nigerian border town of Gamboru Ngala.

== Battle ==
Bodo is located 27 kilometers from Fotokol. On January 29, Boko Haram launched another incursion into Cameroonian territory, clashing with Chadian soldiers near Bodo. This was the first battle between Chadian troops and Boko Haram on Cameroonian soil. The fighting began around 4pm, and the Boko Haram fighters were quickly repulsed. The following day, the militants launched another attack, with the battle lasting several hours. Again, the attack was repelled and Boko Haram was forced to retreat to Gamboru Ngala.

According to the Chadian general staff, 123 jihadists were killed in the battles. Comparatively, three soldiers were killed and twelve were wounded. The Chadian General Staff specified that the three slain soldiers were blown up by an IED. On January 31, a hospital in N'Djamena announced that one of the wounded soldiers died of his injuries. Two civilians were also killed on the 28th and 29th by rocket fire from Nigeria.
