= 2014 Gamboru Ngala massacre =

Militant attack in Nigeria

- Part of the Boko Haram insurgency
- Location: 12°22′32″N 14°12′13″E; Gamboru & Ngala, Borno, Nigeria
- Date: 5 May 2014 (WAT (UTC+1))
- Target: Gamboru, Ngala and its residents
- Attack type: Mass shooting, arson, mass murder
- Weapons: AK-47s, RPGs
- Deaths: At least 300
- Injuries: Unknown
- Perpetrator: Boko Haram

On the night of 5–6 May 2014, Boko Haram militants attacked the twin towns of Gamboru and Ngala in Borno State, northeastern Nigeria. About 310 residents were killed in the 12-hour massacre, and the town was largely destroyed.

During the same night, Boko Haram abducted eight girls aged between 12 and 15 from northeast Nigeria, a number later raised to eleven.

== Background ==
Gamboru Ngala accommodated the security garrison, which had left the town before the attack to pursue the perpetrators of the Chibok schoolgirl kidnapping. Borno State is considered pivotal for Boko Haram. According to the Nigerian senator Ahmed Zanna and several residents, the security forces left Gamboru Ngala after Boko Haram militants had spread rumours that the kidnapped schoolgirls had been spotted elsewhere.

== Massacre ==
Armed with AK-47s and RPGs, the militants attacked the town on two armored personnel carriers, stolen from the Nigerian military several months earlier. The militants opened fire on the people at a busy market that was open at night when temperatures cool. Having set homes ablaze, the militants gunned down residents who tried to escape from the fire.

The official death toll was first set at 200 on 7 May. Zanna and local resident Waziri Hassan both reported at least 336 deaths.
