= Battle of Fotokol =

- Part of Boko Haram insurgency
Date	August 25-September 21, 2014
Location	Fotokol, Far North Region, Cameroon
Result	Cameroonian victory: Boko Haram fails to capture Fotokol

Strength
1,200 soldiers 8 tanks	1,000 fighters

Casualties and losses
26+ killed (late August only)	~260+ killed (per Cameroonian army)

Between August 25 and September 21, 2014, militants from Boko Haram attacked the town of Fotokol, Far North Region, Cameroon. The battle occurred immediately after the capture by Boko Haram of the Nigerian border towns of Gwoza and Gamboru Ngala, where several hundred civilians were killed. After a month-long battle, Cameroonian forces successfully defended the city.

== Background ==
Boko Haram emerged in 2009 as a jihadist social and political movement in a failed rebellion in northeast Nigeria. Throughout the following years, Abubakar Shekau unified militant Islamist groups in the region and continued to foment the rebellion against the Nigerian government, conducting terrorist attacks and bombings in cities and communities across the region.

Throughout 2014, Boko Haram launched incursions into northern Cameroonian territory, with attacks on Gorsi Tourou and other areas. Cameroonian forces and Boko Haram clashed near Fotokol for the first time in a brief skirmish on March 2, 2014. Around thirty jihadists were spotted by a villager, who alerted Cameroonian authorities. Cameroonian forces then dispatched troops to counter the jihadists, including soldiers from the elite Rapid Intervention Battalion (BIR). Seeing the road to Fotokol blocked, the jihadists opened fire, with the fighting killing one soldier and six jihadists.

In August 2014, Boko Haram launched an offensive in eastern Borno State, Nigeria, attacking and seizing the towns of Damboa, Gwoza, and Gamboru Ngala. In these towns, Boko Haram slaughtered over 1,000 civilians alleged to be cooperating with the Nigerian government or not following Boko Haram's strict interpretation of Islam. Thousands of civilians fled from Gamboru Ngala to Fotokol to evade the violence.

== Battle ==
Immediately following the fall of Gamboru Ngala, 300 Nigerian soldiers fled across the river to Fotokol. In response to the seizure of Gamboru Ngala, the Cameroonian army deployed 1,200 troops and eight tanks in Fotokol, while the militants were estimated to have 1,000 fighters. Clashes broke out in the evening of August 25 between the Boko Haram fighters and Cameroonian forces, with the jihadists attempting to destroy the bridge connecting the two cities. The attempt failed, and Cameroonian forces retained control of the bridge.

On August 26 and 27, the jihadists again attempted to infiltrate Fotokol. The Cameroonian army stated they repelled the attack, killing 27 militants. On September 1 around 4pm, Boko Haram launched another attack on the Fotokol bridge. The attack began with mortar fire from the Nigerian side on Cameroonian positions; the Cameroonians responded with artillery. According to a spokesman for the Cameroonian Ministry of Defense, around 40 jihadists were killed in the shelling and one Cameroonian soldier was wounded. The Cameroonian Army claimed in late August to have lost 26 men since the start of the battle.

On September 6 around 1pm, Boko Haram fired two artillery shells toward Fotokol. The soldiers responded with mortar fire. Two days later on the evening of September 8, the Cameroonian army claimed to have killed over 100 jihadists in a battle for the city, including two Tuaregs, while suffering no losses. Cameroonian authorities said that Boko Haram was forced to retreat to about seven kilometers from the town of Gamboru Ngala.

Boko Haram launched another attempt to seize Fotokol from Gamboru Ngala on September 21, but failed to cross the river. At least 50 jihadists were killed in this assault.

== Aftermath ==
Boko Haram assaults on the city of Fotokol largely ended after September 21, but clashes in the vicinity continued through October. Between October 3-4, fighting broke out in the village of Koubougue, located three kilometers from Fotokol. 28 militants were killed in these clashes. On October 24, Boko Haram militants infiltrated the village of Glawi via Fotokol and killed four Nigerian refugees. The Cameroonian army counter-attacked, killing 12 militants, and the remainder were chased to the Nigerian-Cameroonian border. Three civilians were killed in a new assault on Fotokol on November 11, but the assault was repelled.
