= Fall of Gamboru Ngala =

- Part of Boko Haram insurgency
Date	25 August 2014
Location	Gamboru and Ngala, Borno State, Nigeria
Result	Boko Haram victory: Boko Haram captures Gamboru Ngala; Massacres of civilians begin by Boko Haram

Belligerents
Nigeria	Boko Haram

Strength
300	1000

Casualties and losses
Unknown	Unknown
- 200+ civilians killed 15,000 displaced

On 25 August 2014, militants from Boko Haram seized control of the Nigerian border cities of Gamboru and Ngala (often conjoined as Gamboru Ngala), Borno State, Nigeria. Most of the civilians in Gamboru Ngala fled to other parts of Nigeria and across the Cameroonian border. After seizing control of the city, Boko Haram began enacting massacres against civilians and leaders they deemed traitors, killing at least 200 people.

== Background ==
Boko Haram emerged in 2009 as a jihadist social and political movement in a failed rebellion in northeast Nigeria. Throughout the following years, Abubakar Shekau unified militant Islamist groups in the region and continued to foment the rebellion against the Nigerian government, conducting terrorist attacks and bombings in cities and communities across the region.

In May 2014, Boko Haram stormed Gamboru Ngala and opened fire on a market, killing up to 400 people. In August 2014, Boko Haram launched a campaign to capture several cities in Borno State, capturing Damboa in late July and Gwoza and other cities in August. In each city, the group carried out large-scale massacres against civilians and suspected pro-government people.

== Battle ==
The attack began at 5:30am on 25 August, with over 1,000 militants participating. The militants had divided themselves into several groups, and simultaneously attacked the military barracks and police station. The militants then torched houses and shot at any civilians they saw. Militants told remaining civilians to bury the corpses of the dead that were lying on the streets. Only men, particularly young men, were targeted, according to eyewitnesses interviewed by Amnesty International. At least 300 soldiers fled across the border into Cameroon.

Some residents were kidnapped from their home, with one survivor mentioning his 70 year old neighbor was kidnapped by the militants. The number of dead civilians in the aftermath of the fall of the city is unknown; in one neighborhood, a survivor mentioned over 40 bodies lying in the streets she walked, and in Arabic Village, a university campus, there were at least 50 bodies. The city's highest-ranking Muslim official was killed in these massacres. Three days later on 28 August, the militants demanded residents bury bodies in a mass grave on the road to Kalabalge. At least 200 people were buried in this mass grave. Initially, the militants had told civilians they were free to stay but considered them infidels. However, several days later, they began targeting any civilians remaining in the city.

Around 15,000 residents fled across the Cameroonian border into Fotokol, fearing a massacre like the one in May. The militants sought to establish an Islamic state in Gamboru Ngala like they did elsewhere, and installed judges and meted out harsh punishments for people who allegedly broke Islamic law.
