= Bama, Nigeria =

LGA in Borno State, Nigeria

Coordinates: 11°31′08″N 13°41′03″E

- LGA and town
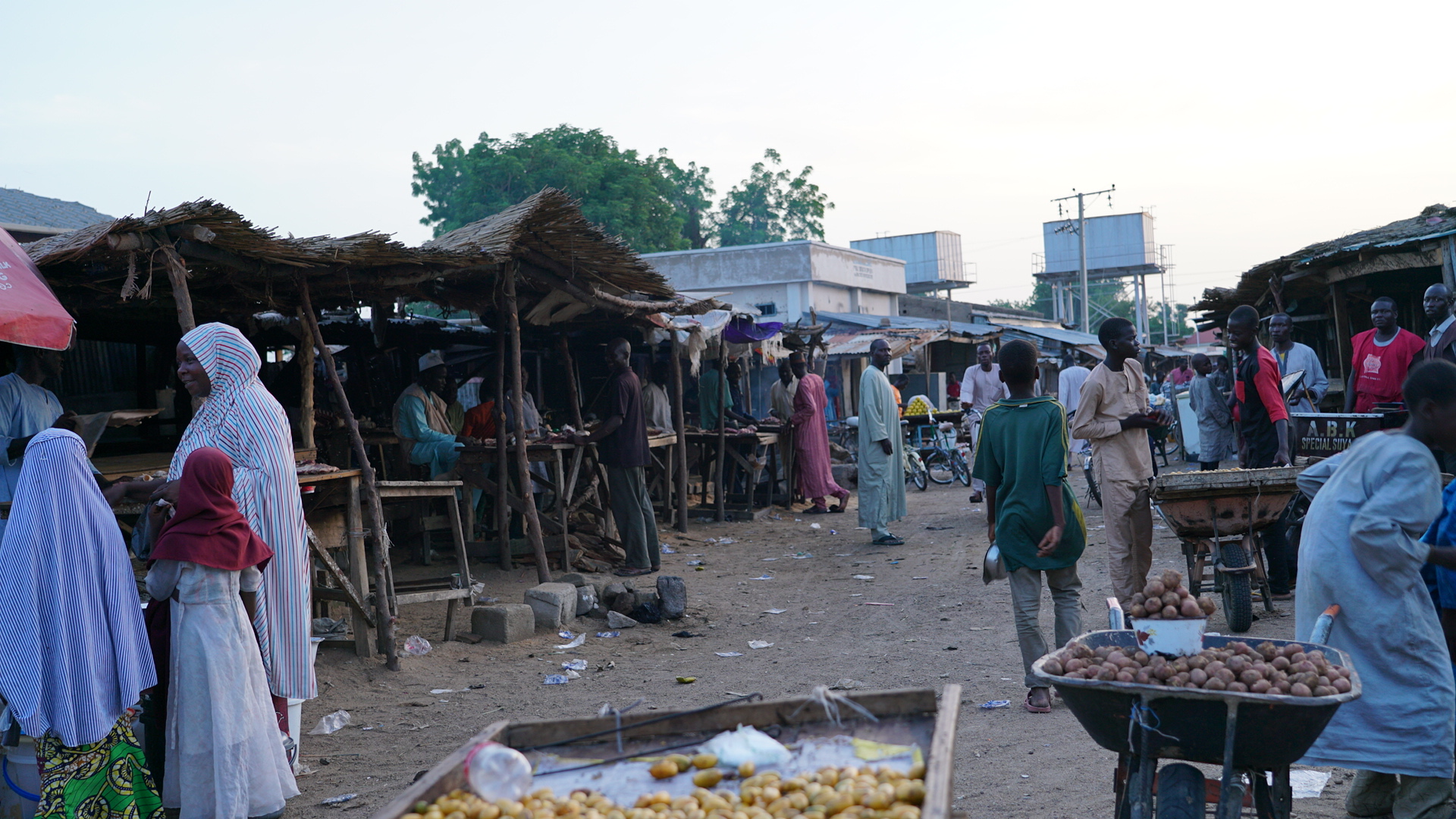
- Interactive map of Bama, Nigeria
- Country: Nigeria
- State: Borno State
- Time zone: UTC+1 (WAT)
- 3-digit postal code prefix: 610

Bama is a town and a local government area (LGA) in the central part of Borno State, Nigeria.

== Demography ==
=== Languages ===
Bama is dominated by Kanuri speaking people. In a 2023 demographic survey of Internally displaced persons (IDPs), the most commonly reported language (spoken at homes and places of primary residence) present in the local government area was Kanuri, spoken by 77.6% of people. Other languages present included; Hausa – 7.3%, Kokata – 5.2%, Mafa – 3.7%, Shuwa Arabic – 3.1% and Wandala (Mandara) – 3.1%. This data was not obtained from a nationally co-ordinated population headcount. The last time Nigeria included ethnic and linguistic data in its enumeration parameters was in the national census of 1963.

== Climate ==
Bama has a Subtropical steppe climate (classification: BSh). The district's yearly average temperature is 31.88 °C (89.38 °F), which is 2.42% higher than Nigeria's averages. Bama typically receives about 36.06 millimetres (1.42 inches) of precipitation and has 61.03 rainy days (16.72% of the time) annually.

== Postal code ==
The postal code of the area is 610.

== History ==
It is located "about 60 kilometres (37 miles) from Maiduguri, the capital of Borno state".

It is the only LGA in the Bama Emirate.

Invaded and captured by Boko Haram in 2014.

== Insurgency cases ==
The town was attacked by Boko Haram in May 2013 and February 2014. As of 22 June 2014:

The two border towns of Bama and Gwoza have been cut off since the declaration of a state of emergency with soldiers blocking the roads linking the town to the state capital, Maiduguri ... Escapees from Bama were forced to take bush routes through Dikwa, a town 60km away from Bama and 150km from Maiduguri to get to the state capital.

On September 2, 2014, Boko Haram seized control of Bama, according to the town's residents.

In December 2014, it was reported that "people too elderly to flee Gwoza Local Government Area were being rounded up and taken to two schools where the militants opened fire on them." Over 50 elderly people were killed. A "gory video" was released of insurgents shooting over a hundred civilians in a school dormitory in the town of Bama.

On 16 March 2015, the Nigerian army said that it had recaptured the city.

On 22 June 2016, the NGO Medicins Sans Frontiers (MSF) reported a "catastrophic humanitarian emergency" in a camp for refugees fleeing Boko Haram near the town of Bama. They stated that more than 1,200 people have died of starvation and illness at the camp. They also reported that between 23 May 2016 and 22 June 2016, at least 188 people have died at the camp (almost six per day), mainly from malnutrition and diarrhoea.
