= Fotokol =

Coordinates: 12°22′N 14°14′E

- Commune and town
- Interactive map of Fotokol
- Country: Cameroon
- Time zone: UTC+1 (WAT)

Fotokol is a town and commune in Logone-et-Chari Department, Far North Region, Cameroon. It is home to Fotokol High School.

The town is about 300 metres (330 yards) across a small river from the Nigerian village of Gamboru, where Fotokol residents often go for supplies. In 2014, the Gamboru Ngala massacre by jihadist group Boko Haram killed 300 people, endangering Fotokol residents as well.

As of June 2014, "soldiers and paramilitary officers have been deployed in ... [Fotokol] to provide security for residents and allow children to safely attend school."

In September 2014, the United Nations announced that it was making efforts to move 5,000 refugees staying in Fotokol to safer locations, to avoid cross-border incursions by Nigerian insurgents. Over 8,000 refugees had already been moved to the Minawo refugee camp.

On 29 and 30 January 2015, fighting between Chadian soldiers and Boko Haram was reported in Fotokol and surrounding areas. On 4 February 2015, Boko Haram launched a counterattack, to a Chadian assault, on Fotokol, killing 81 civilians, 13 Chadian and 6 Cameroonian soldiers. Boko Haram launched a series of suicide attacks in the town, leading to the region's governor to place restrictions on Islamic veils.

On 6 January 2020, a bombing in Gamboru on the bridge which connects it to Fotokol killed at least 30 people.

== See also ==
- Communes of Cameroon
