= Gamboru =

Human settlement in Nigeria

Coordinates: 12.3706°N 14.2172°E

Gamboru (or Gamburu) is a market town in Borno State, northeast Nigeria, near the Cameroon border. It is the administrative headquarters of the local government area.

The A3 highway terminates here and continues into Cameroon as part of the Trans-Sahel Highway.

A 2013 IRIN report indicated that pharmacies in Gamboru Ngala were subject to attack by Islamist insurgents Boko Haram, and that the prices of medicines had "gone up by at least a third" as a result.

The Boko Haram attack on Gamboru on May 5–6, 2014, and its twin town of Ngala killed at least 300 people. Some residents reported that they planned to move to Cameroon in the wake of the attacks, and a Nigerian Army source indicated that corruption was hampering efforts to defend local residents.

On May 9, 2014, it was reported that the bridge linking Gamboru to the rest of Nigeria, and also linking "the immigration checkpoints of both Cameroon and Nigeria," had been destroyed. On May 11 it was reported that Borno State Governor Kashim Shettima had visited the town to view the destruction and offer condolences, and "promised to rebuild the Gamboru Ngala central market." Local government chairman Bakura Mustapha indicated that over 200 vehicles, and "hundreds of shops and houses" had been burned.

On 2 February 2015, the Nigerian Army said it had recaptured Gamboru from Boko Haram, along with the nearby towns of Mafa, Mallam Fatori, Abadam, and Marte, following joint military operations by Nigerian and Cameroonian forces, civilian forces, and three days of Chadian airstrikes.

On 6 January 2020, a bomb at the marketplace on the bridge to Fotokol killed at least 30 people.

== Climate ==
In Gamboru, the dry season is oppressively hot, windy, and generally cloudy, whereas the wet season is oppressively hot, oppressive, and partially cloudy. The average annual temperature ranges from 14 to 41 degrees Celsius or 58 to 106 degrees Fahrenheit, and it rarely rises over 44 °C (111 °F).
