= Moussarom and Ngueleya attacks =

- Part of Boko Haram insurgency
Date	September 28-29, 2018
Location	Moussarom and Ngueleya, Lake Chad, Chad
Result	Chadian victory

Belligerents
Chad	ISWAP

Casualties and losses
1-2 killed	17 killed
- 2-4 civilians killed

Between September 28 and 29, 2018, militants from the Islamic State – West Africa Province (ISWAP) attacked the villages of Moussarom and Ngueleya on the shores of Lake Chad.

== Background ==
Boko Haram, known after March 7, 2015, as the Islamic State's West Africa Province (ISWAP), first attacked Chadian territory in March 2015 at the battle of Ngouboua, killing several Chadian soldiers and several dozen civilians. They attacked Chadian territory several more times in 2015, but barely in 2016. ISWAP attacked the village of Djoroye near Kaïga between September 24 and 25, 2016, killing seven Chadian soldiers. On May 5, 2017, ISWAP attacked a Chadian post at Kaïga, embarrassing the Chadian army. A June 2017 offensive by the Chadian army staved off any more ISWAP attacks.

== Attacks ==
On the night of September 28, ISWAP militants attacked the villages of Moussarom and Ngueleya, a few dozen kilometers south of Baga Sola. The attackers were defeated by Chadian troops nearby and repelled. The attacks were the third ISWAP incursion into Chadian territory in four months. According to a security source speaking to AFP, two soldiers, three forestry agents, and a customs officer were killed in the battle. The Chadian government only acknowledged the deaths of one soldier, one forestry agent, and one civilian, although they claimed that 17 jihadists were killed in the confrontation.
