= 2017 Lake Chad offensive =

- Part of Boko Haram insurgency
| Date | June 24–25, 2017 |
| Location | Malkonory, Toumbo, Rego, Aregué, Métilé, and Toumbo Djéni, Lake Chad, Chad |
| Result | Chadian victory |

Belligerents
| Chad; France (logistical support only) | ISWAP |

Casualties and losses
| 8 killed 18 injured | 162 killed |

Between June 24 and 25, 2017, Chadian forces launched an offensive against ISWAP in Chadian areas of Lake Chad, killing over 164 jihadists.

== Background ==
Boko Haram, known after March 7, 2015, as the Islamic State's West Africa Province (ISWAP), first attacked Chadian territory in March 2015 at the battle of Ngouboua, killing several Chadian soldiers and several dozen civilians. They attacked Chadian territory several more times in 2015, but barely in 2016. ISWAP attacked the village of Djoroye near Kaïga between September 24 and 25, 2016, killing seven Chadian soldiers. On May 5, 2017, ISWAP attacked a Chadian post at Kaïga, embarrassing the Chadian army.

== Offensive ==
On June 24, Chadian forces launched their offensive on ISWAP on six islands on Lake Chad in Chadian territory; Malkonory, Toumbo, Rego, Aregue, Metile, and Toumbo Djeni. Chadian army spokesman Azem Bermandoa said that "the satanic forces of Boko Haram" were driven from the islands by June 25. According to him, eight Chadian soldiers were killed and 18 were injured across the day of fighting. ISWAP suffered 162 deaths and six vehicles destroyed. French soldiers in Operation Barkhane also took an active role in the offensive, providing medical support and evacuating wounded Chadian soldiers from the battlefield.
