= 2019 Rann massacre =

- Part of Boko Haram insurgency
- Location: Rann, Kala-Balge LGA, Borno State, Nigeria
- Date: 28 January 2019; 9am
- Deaths: 60+
- Injuries: Unknown
- Victims: 50 missing 40,000 displaced
- Perpetrator: Jama'atu Ahlis Sunna

On 28 January 2019, Jama'atu Ahlis Sunna (also known as Boko Haram) attacked the town of Rann, Borno State, Nigeria, killing at least 60 civilians and displacing around 40,000 more.

== Background ==
Boko Haram emerged in 2009 as a jihadist social and political movement in a failed rebellion in northeast Nigeria. Throughout the following years, Abubakar Shekau unified militant Islamist groups in the region and continued to foment the rebellion against the Nigerian government, conducting terrorist attacks and bombings in cities and communities across the region. In 2016, the group split into the Islamic State – West Africa Province (ISWAP) led by Abu Musab al-Barnawi and Jama'atu Ahlis Sunna (JAS), also known as Boko Haram, led by Abubakar Shekau.

On 17 January 2017, the Nigerian Air Force mistakenly bombed civilians in Rann, killing over a hundred displaced civilians. Despite both Nigerian and Cameroonian troops being stationed in the town, Rann is home to an IDP camp with around 35,000 refugees. In December 2018, a jihadist group attacked Nigerian soldiers in Rann, although whether it was ISWAP or JAS is unknown. On 14 January 2019, JAS attacked the Nigerian military base in Rann, breaching it with "relative ease" and killing 14 people including three soldiers. Around 9,000 people fled Rann after the 14 Jan attack, but almost all were forced by the Cameroonian military to return.

After the 14 January attack, Nigerian and Cameroonian troops returned to the base in Rann. The Cameroonian troops went back across the border to Cameroon on 27 January, and the Nigerian troops left because they did not have enough men and weapons to hold the post.

== Massacre ==
The massacre took place exactly one day after the Nigerian and Cameroonian troops departed the town. At around 9am on 28 January, a group of Boko Haram militants arrived on motorcycles and began setting houses in Rann ablaze. Satellite footage in the days after the attack analyzed by Amnesty International showed that hundreds of structures were burned in the east, south, and southeast of the city, right next to the military base. In the days after the attack, ten Civilian Joint Task Force militiamen buried the bodies of eleven civilians in the town. Outside the town, the bodies of 49 civilians were found, having been shot at by Boko Haram militants while fleeing the carnage.

Amnesty International reported that at least 60 civilians were killed in the massacre, calling it the "deadliest attack yet" on Rann. All of the town's elders and traditional leaders were executed, except for one. One civilian interviewed by Reuters said that the corpses of the dead were lying in the streets. Another 50 people were unaccounted for after the attack. Around 40,000 people fled Rann following both the 14 and 28 January massacres, almost all of them into Goura, in Cameroon. About 35,000 people fled Rann following the 28 January attack. 10,000 of these displaced people returned to Rann by 27 February, and 42,000 returned by July. The Nigerian government denied that any attack or killings took place.

No group claimed responsibility for the attack, but Jama'atu Ahlis Sunna was considered to be the suspect.
