= 2015 Lake Chad offensive =

- Part of Boko Haram insurgency
Date	July 15 - early August 2015
Location	Lake Chad, Chad
Result	Chadian victory

Belligerents
Chad	Islamic State - West Africa Province

Strength
1,000	Unknown

Casualties and losses
4+ killed (per AFP and Liberation); 2 killed, 2 wounded (per Chad)	117 killed (per Chad)
- 60 civilians killed 120 civilians kidnapped 80,000 displaced

Between July 15 and early August 2015, the Chadian army launched an offensive against the Islamic State – West Africa Province in Chadian areas of Lake Chad.

== Background ==
Boko Haram, known after March 7, 2015 as the Islamic State's West Africa Province (ISWAP), first attacked Chadian territory in March at the battle of Ngouboua, killing several Chadian soldiers and several dozen civilians. In May they attacked Choua, but were repulsed by Chadian soldiers. Two months later in July, ISWAP militants attacked the heavily-guarded island of Koumguia, resulting in another defeat.

== Offensive ==
The Chadian army launched the offensive on July 15 against the islands of Koungya, Merikouta, Choua, and Blarigui. Before scouting for ISWAP, the army embarked to evacuate all of the civilians on the islands. By the end of July, 90% of the civilian population had been evacuated and over 1,000 soldiers were deployed across the islands.

On July 25, ISWAP began harassing Chadian forces in the villages of Medi, Blarigui, and on Fitine island. In a skirmish at Midi Koutou, one Chadian soldier was killed as well as six jihadists. Another 15 jihadists were wounded in the skirmish, and retreated with at least 30 women and children. Two days later on July 27, one of the ISWAP columns was intercepted southeast of Baga Sola, and the fighting lasted until the evening. Three Chadian soldiers were killed along with thirteen jihadists in this battle.

On July 31, the Chadian government announced it had killed 117 jihadists in two weeks of fighting, at the cost of two soldiers killed and two wounded. The following week on August 5, seven jihadists were killed and several more wounded in a clash on the island of Tchoukou Dallah.

Thomas Gartner, one of the coordinators of OCHA, stated on August 9 that since July 15, 80,000 people had been displaced as a result of the offensive. Gartner also said that 60 civilians had been killed and 120 others had been abducted.
