= Lithie attack =

- Part of Boko Haram insurgency
Date	October 6, 2015
Location	Lithie, Chad
Result	Indecisive

Belligerents
Chad	ISWAP

Casualties and losses
11 killed 13 wounded	17 killed

On October 6, 2015, militants from the Islamic State – West Africa Province attacked the Chadian island of Lithie, but were repulsed.

== Background ==
Boko Haram, known after March 7, 2015 as the Islamic State's West Africa Province (ISWAP), first attacked Chadian territory in March at the battle of Ngouboua, killing several Chadian soldiers and several dozen civilians. In May they attacked Choua, but were repulsed by Chadian soldiers. Two months later in July, ISWAP militants attacked the heavily-guarded island of Koumguia, resulting in another defeat. Chadian forces expelled ISWAP from Chadian territory for the most part in an offensive by the end of July, but ISWAP was able to return through the porous borders in Niger, Nigeria, and Cameroon.

== Attack ==
At around 3:40am on October 6, ISWAP fighters attacked a Chadian army position near Lithie on an island on Lake Chad. Lithie is located near the larger town of Kaiga Ngouboua, two kilometers from the Nigerian border. The Chadian government said that 11 soldiers were killed and 13 were wounded, along with 17 jihadists killed.
