= Siege of Birnin Gwari =

- Part of Nigerian bandit conflict
Date	3 June 2022
Location	Birnin Gwari, Kaduna State, Nigeria
Result	Indecisive: Fighting ceases after 3 June

Belligerents
Nigeria; Birnin Gwari Vanguards for Safety and Good Governance	Ansaru

Casualties and losses
Unknown	2+ killed
- Many civilians killed Many civilians kidnapped

Between 31 May and 2 June 2022, militants from Ansaru laid siege to the town of Birnin Gwari, Kaduna State, Nigeria, kidnapping and killing people who tried to get in or out of the city.

== Background ==
Ansaru is an al-Qaeda aligned Islamist group based in Kaduna State that split off from Boko Haram in 2012. After pledging allegiance to al-Qaeda in 2022 after years in declining membership, the group found a foothold in Kaduna State where it made peace with local villages and imposed Sharia law in areas. The group had based most of its recruitment in eastern Birnin Gwari LGA, from the communities of Old Kuyello, Kazage, Kutemeshe, Kwasa-Kwasa, Gobirawa, and Farin Ruwa. On 5 April, Ansaru militants attacked a Nigerian military base in Polwire, near Birnin Gwari, killing seventeen soldiers and three vigilantes. In late May 2022, just eight days before the start of the siege, Ansaru began setting up checkpoints on highways leading out of Birnin Gwari.

== Siege ==
The first attack on Birnin Gwari began on 31 May along the Birnin-Gwari-Kaduna highway, near the town of Udawa. Eight vehicles traveling in a convoy were set ablaze by the militants, and an unknown number of civilians were killed and abducted. The abducted were mostly women and children. Many of the civilians killed were burned alive in their vehicles. Nigerian soldiers were deployed to the area of the attack along the highway.

Ibrahim Nagwari, the commander of local vigilante group Birnin Gwari Vanguard for Security and Good Governance, said that attacks along the road continued by Ansaru militants until 3 June. An unknown number of citizens were killed and abducted in the ensuing attacks. A local representative for the National Union for Road Transport Workers said that four of his drivers were missing from the attacks. A civilian in Birnin Gwari told BBC that he heard gunshots throughout the city every day. Kaduna State Police representative Mohammed Jalige said he was unaware of the attacks.

On 2 June, Jalige said that two militants were killed in a skirmish that began between Ansaru and Nigerian forces when they were deployed to the highway. By 4 June, residents in Birnin Gwari said that the violence had died down.

== Aftermath ==
Attacks in July and August intensified against communities in Birnin Gwari LGA, but not in the city itself. Highway attacks also ceased. Civilians from these villages fled to Birnin Gwari city and other areas in Kaduna.
