= Bakura Doro =

Nigerian militant and leader of Boko Haram

- Born: Ibrahim Mahamadu (according to Niger) c. 1985 (age 40–41); Doron Baga, Nigeria
- Other name: "Abu Umaimata" or "Abu Umayma" (nom de guerre)
- Military career
- Allegiance: Boko Haram (c. 2000s–present); Islamic State (2015–2016)
- Rank: "Imam" (commander)
- Commands: "Bakura faction" (from c. 2016); Boko Haram (from 2022)
- Conflicts: Boko Haram insurgency: 2009 Boko Haram uprising; Chad Basin campaign (2018–2020); Boko Haram–ISWAP conflict; Battles of Toumbun Allura Kurnawa and Toumbun Gini

Bakura Doro, also known by his nom de guerre Abu Umaimata al-Muhajir or Abu Umayma al-Muhajir, is a Nigerian militant who is the leader or "imam" of Boko Haram, an Islamist militant group involved in an insurgency against Nigeria and other states.

== Biography ==
Bakura Doro was born around 1985 and grew up in Doron Baga in northern Borno State, Nigeria. He is reportedly an ethnic Kanuri. He initially worked in the informal economy, and joined the religious movement of Mohammed Yusuf. This movement eventually became Boko Haram, and Bakura stayed loyal to the group during and after the 2009 uprising. After Yusuf's death and the rise of his successor Abubakar Shekau, Bakura fought for Boko Haram in the escalating rural insurgency. Even though he lacked a background in religious Islamic studies, he started to climb in Boko Haram's ranks due to his skill as a battlefield officer. Earning a "reputation for shrewdness and independence", Bakura was eventually appointed munzir (mid-level commander). In 2015, Shekau pledged allegiance to the Islamic State (IS), rebranding Boko Haram to become the "Islamic State's West Africa Province" (ISWAP). However, disagreements gradually developed between Shekau and the IS central command in Syria. In 2016, the group splintered into IS loyalists and Shekau loyalists, with Bakura joining the latter camp. The pro-IS faction continued to use the name "ISWAP", whereas Shekau's faction was generally still described as "Boko Haram".

After the rebel group's division, Bakura led his troops to the northern shores of Lake Chad, an area which became the center of his operations. Shekau rewarded Bakura's loyalty by appointing him amir ul-fiya (zone commander) of Lake Chad. The Boko Haram forces at Lake Chad subsequently became internationally known as the "Bakura faction"; most of his troops were reportedly Buduma people. His unit took part in the Chad Basin campaign (2018–2020), and was possibly responsible for attacks on Bama, Banki, Ngom, Tungunshe, and Maiduguri. Several of these operations targeted civilians, often resulting in massacres. Researcher Jacob Zenn summarized that the Bakura faction "enslav[ed] Muslim women, conduct[ed] female suicide bombings, raid[ed] barracks, [and] kill[ed] innocent fishermen" during this period. In March 2020, the Nigerian and Nigerien militaries falsely claimed to have killed Bakura in battle.

In May 2021, Shekau was killed during a battle against ISWAP. Afterward, Boko Haram appeared nearly defeated as the group splintered, while many of its forces defected or deserted. The remaining loyalists rallied under Shekau's designated successor, a cleric named Sahalaba. Bakura also remained committed to Boko Haram, launching several raids against IS targets in the immediate aftermath of Shekau's demise. Over time, Bakura's power grew, and he managed to stabilize the remnants of Boko Haram. Meanwhile, there were a series of unsuccessful negotiations between IS and Boko Haram, with Sahalaba favoring reconciliation. Disagreeing with this approach as well as seeking more power, Bakura murdered Sahalaba in March 2022 and took over the imamate (command) of Boko Haram. After a short struggle with Sahalaba's remaining loyalists, he cemented his control over the group. On 2 May 2022, Boko Haram published a video declaring Bakura its new leader under the name "Abu Umaimata". Under his command, Boko Haram continued to fight both the regional government as well as its jihadist rival, ISWAP.

Over the course of the next months, Bakura managed to reinforce Boko Haram's position as well as took more ISWAP territory. Among his notable successes were the Battles of Toumbun Allura Kurnawa and Toumbun Gini from December 2022 to January 2023. Furthermore, his group largely removed itself from the "global jihadist movement", with Bakura focusing on local warfare instead of propaganda or international networks. In 2024, he was accused of having taken part in the Kuriga kidnapping.

In 2025, the Nigerien military claimed that it had killed Doro on 15 August in a "surgical operation" involving three successive airstrikes on Shiliawa Island in the Chad Basin, near the Nigerian border. The claim, which was made without evidence, was denied by Boko Haram and was also doubted by experts who spoke with Agence France-Presse.

Under Doro's leadership, Boko Haram allegedly entered into a secret three month ceasefire agreement with the Nigerian government in exchange for the release of captives from Ngoshe in late 2026. A Boko Haram sharia judge denied the ceasefire, stating they were fabrications for the upcoming Nigerian elections. Violence from Boko Haram has decreased in Nigeria since the alleged ceasefire but increased in Cameroon.

== Character ==
Unlike his former superior and predecessor Shekau, Bakura Doro has been described as a more grounded leader. He generally avoids media attention and making propaganda appearances, instead personally leading his troops at the frontlines.
