= Ansaru =

Islamist militant organization in Nigeria

Vanguard for the Protection of Muslims in Black Africa (Ansaru)
- جماعة أنصار المسلمين في بلاد السودان; Jamāʿatu Anṣāril Muslimīna fī Bilādis Sūdān
- Leaders: Abubakar Adam Kambar ("Abu Yasir") †; Khalid Barnawi ("Abu Usamatal Ansari") (POW) Abu Jafa'ar (spokesman)
- Dates active: c. 2009–2012 (as Boko Haram faction); 2012–present (officially)
- Active regions: Northern Nigeria
- Ideology: Islamic fundamentalist Jihadism
- Size: 2,000 (2016)
- Part of: Boko Haram (2009–2012); Al-Qaeda (2012-present)
- Wars: the Boko Haram insurgency and the nigerian bandit conflict

The Vanguard for the Protection of Muslims in Black Africa (Arabic: جماعة أنصار المسلمين في بلاد السودان Jamāʿatu Anṣāril Muslimīna fī Bilādis Sūdān), better known as Ansaru and less commonly called al-Qaeda in the Lands Beyond the Sahel, is an Islamic fundamentalist Jihadist militant organisation originally based in the northeast of Nigeria. Originally a faction of Boko Haram, the group announced in 2012 that it had pledged allegiance to al-Qaeda and was independent. Despite this, Ansaru and other Boko Haram factions continued to work closely together until the former increasingly declined and stopped its insurgent activities in 2013. The group was revived in 2020, and has been involved in the Nigerian bandit conflict.

== Ideology ==
Unlike Boko Haram, whose ideology is focused on Nigeria, Ansaru is more internationally orientated. Its beliefs are closely aligned to those of al-Qaeda. Furthermore, the group has vowed to restore the "dignity of Muslims in black Africa" by reviving the Sokoto Caliphate. The group was also critical of Boko Haram's indiscriminate killing of civilians, with Ansaru commander Khalid Barnawi claiming that his followers would not kill innocent non-Muslims or security officials, except in "self-defense" and that the group would defend the interests of Islam and Muslims not just in Nigeria but the whole of Africa.

Ansaru's motto is "Jihad Fi Sabilillah", meaning "fight the enemies of Islam for the cause of Allah".

Similar to other jihadists, Ansaru maintains a media wing known as al-Yaqout Media, through which they publish promotional material and updates on the group. The group released a video on 29 November 2021, in which they praised various al-Qaeda figureheads and denounced Boko Haram. They also published a message on 18 December congratulating the Taliban for their victory in Afghanistan. On 31 December, the group published a message reaffirming its hostility to Boko Haram's ideology and stating that they had sworn allegiance to al-Qaeda in the Islamic Maghreb in 2020. The group announced on 14 January 2022 that al-Yaqout Media had been incorporated into the Global Islamic Media Front, the official media outlet for al-Qaeda and its affiliates, seemingly confirming al-Qaeda core's acknowledgement and support of the group.

== History ==
=== 2009: Foundation ===
Ansaru's exact origin is unclear, but it is known that the group emerged as a faction of Boko Haram, an extremist Islamist movement that launched an uprising against the Nigerian government in 2009. The initial rebellion failed, whereupon some of those involved in the movement fled to Algeria and Somalia, where they found shelter among al-Qaeda-linked organizations such as AQIM and al-Shabaab. Led by Khalid Barnawi (nom de guerre: "Abu Usamatal Ansari") and Abubakar Adam Kambar ("Abu Yasir"), two close associates of Boko Haram founder Mohammed Yusuf, the exiles became known as "Sahara Men", or "Yan Sahara" in Hausa. They forged close bonds with the al-Qaeda affiliates and trained with them, adopting their ideology and tactics. As result of those experiences, the "Sahara Men" became more sophisticated than the Boko Haram groups which had remained in Nigeria, and eventually came to criticize the latter's way of waging an insurgency.

Having returned to Nigeria, Khalid Barnawi and Abubakar Adam Kambar disagreed with other Boko Haram commanders over the indiscriminate killing of civilians, urging a more concentrated effort against Western and high-profile targets. As result of those disagreements, Ansaru officially split from Boko Haram in January 2012. Khalid Barnawi denounced Boko Haram's actions as "inhuman to the Muslim Ummah". Ansaru became al-Qaeda's de facto branch in Nigeria, and even occasionally called itself "al-Qaeda in the Lands Beyond the Sahel". Ansaru elected Abubakar Adam Kambar as its first commander, but he was killed in August 2012, whereupon Khalid Barnawi became the group's leader.

=== 2009–2013: Operations ===
Unlike Boko Haram, which is largely based in Borno State in northeastern Nigeria, Ansaru operated in and around Kano State in north-central Nigeria, the heartland of the Hausa-Fulani peoples. It coordinated its activities with the northern Mali-based al-Qaeda in the Islamic Maghreb and the Movement for Oneness and Jihad in West Africa, and was suspected of having sent some of its fighters to Mali, where they fought in the Northern Mali conflict. Ansaru was probably driven from Mali in course of Operation Serval.

Throughout its insurgent activity in Nigeria, Ansaru closely cooperated with Boko Haram despite being its rival. This was mostly out of necessity, as the two factions could not risk weakening themselves by fighting each other.

Ansaru claimed responsibility for a prison break at the Special Anti-Robbery Squad headquarters in Abuja in November 2012, a January 2013 attack on a convoy of Nigerian troops on their way to participate in the Northern Mali conflict and a 23 May 2013 attack on a French-owned uranium mine in Niger in cooperation with Mokhtar Belmokhtar.

The group also carried out a number of kidnappings in Nigeria, including the May 2011 abductions of a Briton and an Italian from Kebbi State, the December 2012 kidnapping of a French engineer, Francis Collomp, in Katsina State and the February 2013 kidnapping of seven foreigners (four Lebanese, a Briton, an Italian and a Greek) from a construction site in Bauchi State. Collomp escaped in November 2013. Ansaru executed the hostages taken in both May 2011 and February 2013 following what it said were failed rescue attempts by the British and Nigerian governments.

=== 2013–2019: Decline ===
Several of Ansaru's commanders were reported as returning to Boko Haram over 2013. Ansaru held a meeting in 2015, discussing whether it wanted to join ISIL like Boko Haram had done. It decided to remain independent, whereupon several of its members defected to Boko Haram. Following this event, Ansaru became largely dormant and ceased its attacks in Nigeria. Khalid al-Barnawi, the leader of Ansaru, was arrested by Nigerian security forces in Lokoja in April 2016.

Although its operations had largely ceased by this point, Ansaru continued to have an online presence by late 2017, suggesting that several members of the group remained in hiding, possibly waiting for an opportunity to revive the group.

=== 2020–present: Resurgence ===
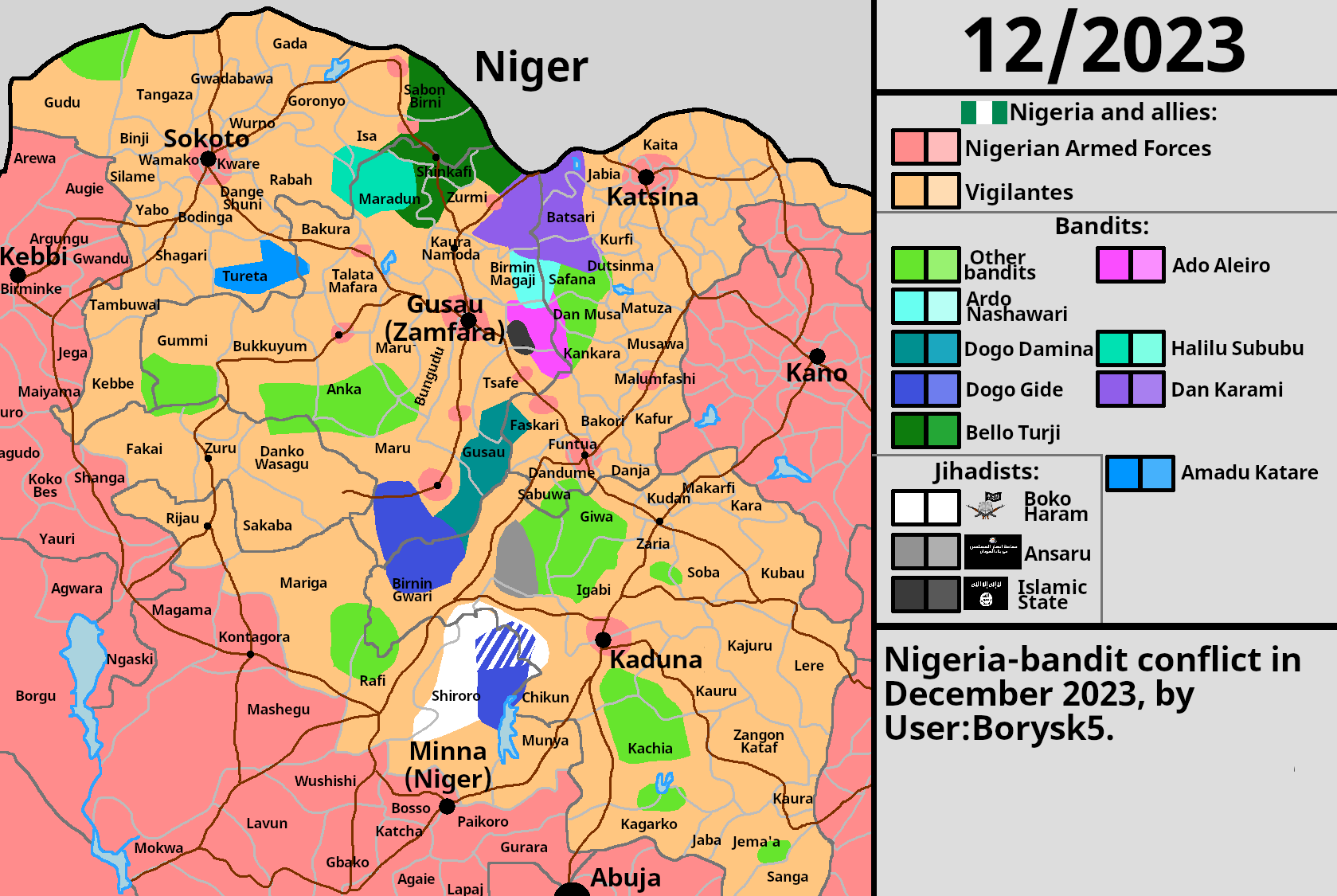
Map outlining the Nigerian bandit conflict as of December 2023. Territories under control of Ansaru are in gray.

In what is its first claimed operation since 2013, Ansaru announced that it was behind the 14 January 2020 attack on the convoy of the Emir of Potiskum, Alhaji Umaru Bubaram, which was travelling on Kaduna-Zaria road. The government confirmed that at least 6 Nigerian Army soldiers were killed in the attack, while Ansaru claims to have killed 22 soldiers.

In response, on 4 February 2020 the Nigerian government launched an attack on an Ansaru camp housing bandits and kidnappers, reportedly killing 250 while sustaining a single casualty. The government seized nearly a dozen rifles and hundreds of rounds of ammunition.

On 13 August 2020, the Nigerian Air Force launched Operation Thunder Strike, targeting the camp of bandits linked to Ansaru in the Kuduru Forest of Kaduna State. A government statement claimed the operation killed "several" bandits.

Ansaru staged its resurgence in Nigeria's North-West and North-Central areas amid a large scale bandit conflict in the regions. Since their reappearance, the group has maintained a presence in Kaduna State, specifically in Birnin Gwari, Chikun, Igabi and Giwa local government areas (LGOs). The group has been involved in kidnappings as well as supplying weapons to bandit groups from neighbouring al-Qaeda branch, JNIM. Ansaru has employed a 'hearts and minds' strategy to win over local communities, promising to protect them from bandit groups free of any payment, as well as supplying locals Muslims with food and farmers with agricultural necessities such as fertilizer and pesticides. The group has sent clerics into various communities who denounce the government, secular politics and democracy; warning people to stay clear of the latter.

An Ansaru clash with bandits in Birnin Gwari occurred on 28 September 2021, killing 4 bandits as well as 1 Ansaru member. The clashes had started due Ansaru demanding that the bandits stop abductions and invasions of other communities. Further engagements occurred during the week, with Ansaru claiming to have killed 30 bandits.

On 28 March 2022, an Abuja-Kaduna train was attacked by armed militants. The attackers bombed the tracks before opening fire on the cart and abducting several people. The attacks killed 8 people, wounded 26 and lead to over 100 people being held ransom. Though no group officially took responsibility for the attack, a video released by the attackers suggests that Ansaru or another Islam-adjacent militant group was responsible. An investigation suggests that Ansaru may have collaborated on the attack with other bandit groups as revenge for the government raiding the camp of an Ansaru-aligned bandit group. Despite this, Ansaru has publicly denied any role in the attack.

An attack on an army base in Birnin Gwari on 5 April left 15 soldiers dead and dozens injured. The attackers reportedly invaded the base with motorcycles and used heavy weaponry such as rocket-propelled grenades (RPGs) to destroy two armored personnel carriers (APCs). Ishaq Usman Kasai, chairman of Birnin-Gwari Emirate Progressive Union (BEPU) said that Ansaru was believed to be responsible the attack.

On July 5, Ansaru coordinated with ISWAP during the Kuje prison attack which killed 5 people and freed 879 prisoners, likely including Ansaru members. Gunmen breached the prison with explosives, allowing them to storm the building and free scores of captives. Ansaru aided the main ISWAP assault through providing reconnaissance. The attack serves as a rare moment of cooperation between al-Qaeda and the Islamic State, who typically view each other as enemies.

On 13 July, a convoy of nearly 200 bandits on motorcycles battled with Ansaru in Damari, a small town in Kazage Ward, Birnin Gwari. The clashes lasted for approximately an hour, causing damages to several buildings and vehicles in the town, as well as the death of 2 civilians by fleeing bandits. Ansaru eventually repelled the attack, with locals hailing them for their defense of the community.

Despite Ansaru's victory, the bandits returned to Damari on 25 July unopposed, killing 3 people in the town. The bandits returned on 26 July, looting local shops and kidnapping 13 people. Ansaru had seemingly lost control of the town, allowing bandits to move unchallenged and kidnap more than 50 people over the next few days, leading to a large exodus.

Another clash between Ansaru and bandits occurred in Damari on 21 November, with Ansaru killing 5 of the bandits before retreating from the town.

On 14 August 2023, bandit leader Dogo Gide and his group downed a Nigerian Army helicopter reportedly killing 20 troops. Gide and his organization have been linked to Ansaru, leading to speculation that the group has begun allying with other bandit groups.

Locals of Kuyello, Birnin Gwari, spotted a group of Ansaru militants riding on 10 motorcycles on 7 October. They passed through the town again on 23 October, expressing willingness to establish control in the town, despite resistance from the locals. Local bandits ambushed a group of Ansaru militants in the town on 14 December, killing 5 of them. The bandits then overran Kuyello on 17 December as Ansaru retreated into nearby forests due to their losses. Ansaru then battled the bandits in the forest, reportedly killing "many" of them.

Ansaru battled Dogo Gide's group over control of a gold mine in Kuyello on 1 April 2024. Gide's group reportedly suffered numerous losses during the battle, including that of close associates, family members and wanted bandits Mudi and Murtala.

In 2025, Nigerian authorities announced the arrest of the group's leader, Mahmud Muhammad Usman.

== Designation as terrorist organization ==
Ansaru is designated as a proscribed terrorist organization by Iraq, Nigeria, United States, New Zealand and the United Kingdom.

== See also ==
- Boko Haram
- Boko Haram insurgency
- Nigerian bandit conflict

== Bibliography ==
- Comolli, Virginia (2015). Boko Haram: Nigeria's Islamist Insurgency. London: Oxford University Press.
- "Curbing Violence in Nigeria (II): The Boko Haram Insurgency" (PDF). Africa Report (216). Brussels: International Crisis Group. 3 April 2014. Archived from the original (PDF) on 17 January 2016.
