= Chad Basin campaign =

Chad Basin campaign may refer to:

- The conquests of Rabih az-Zubayr
- French conquest of Chad
- German conquest of northern Cameroon
- 2015 West African offensive, counter-insurgency campaign by an international coalition against Boko Haram
- Chad Basin campaign (2018–2020), a series of offensives by Boko Haram, the Islamic State, and an international coalition against both of them
