= Battle of Kareto (2016) =

- Part of Boko Haram insurgency
Date	18 April 2016
Location	Kareto, Borno State, Nigeria
Result	Tactical Nigerian victory, strategic ISWAP victory

Belligerents
Nigeria	ISWAP

Units involved
113th Battalion; 157th Battalion; 29th Task Force Brigade	Unknown

Casualties and losses
24 wounded (per Nigeria); 10-100+ killed (per Jeune Afrique)	Unknown

On 18 April 2016, the Islamic State – West Africa Province (ISWAP) attacked Nigerian soldiers at Kareto, inflicting one of the worst Nigerian defeats in a year.

== Background ==
Boko Haram emerged in 2009 as a jihadist social and political movement in a failed rebellion in northeast Nigeria. Throughout the following years, Abubakar Shekau unified militant Islamist groups in the region and continued to foment the rebellion against the Nigerian government, conducting terrorist attacks and bombings in cities and communities across the region. On 7 March 2015, the group publicly declared allegiance to the Islamic State and became known as the Islamic State – West Africa Province (ISWAP).

By early 2016, ISWAP was mostly on the backfoot after having been driven out by Nigerian and allied forces. A brief incursion into Ngoshe and Kumche by Cameroonian soldiers killed several hundred fighters, but otherwise the group was active.

== Battle ==
Kareto is the headquarters of the Nigerian Army's 113th Battalion. The insurgents entered Kareto wearing military fatigues, making many of the soldiers in Kareto believe they were from another visiting unit. The Nigerian Army did not initially comment on the attack, but Jeune Afrique called it "one of the worst defeats suffered by the Nigerian army". The battle lasted for ten hours, and was reportedly fierce. The Nigerian Air Force was involved, and Channels TV said Nigerian forces repulsed the attack. Later, the Nigerian Army said that 24 soldiers were wounded, two of them being officers. However, Jeune Afrique reporting said that between 10 and 100 soldiers were killed at the headquarters in Kareto. This was backed by an anonymous source who spoke to This Day, who said that several of his comrades were still missing. Nigerian military sources said that had reinforcements from the 157th Battalion and the 29th Task Force Brigade not arrived in the middle of the battle, casualties would have been worse.

Following the battle, Channels TV reporters said that they saw military equipment headed towards Kareto, and the area was now calm.
