= Birnin Gwari military base attack =

Attack

- Part of Nigerian bandit conflict and Islamist insurgency in the Sahel
- Location: Polwire, Birnin Gwari, Kaduna State, Nigeria
- Date: 5 April 2022
- Deaths: 20 killed: 17 Nigerian soldiers killed; 3 civilian vigilantes killed
- Injuries: 23 injured
- Perpetrator: Ansaru

On 5 April 2022, militants from Ansaru attacked a Nigerian military base in Birnin Gwari, Kaduna State, Nigeria. The attack killed seventeen soldiers and injured twenty-three others.

== Prelude ==
The jihadist group Ansaru split off from Boko Haram in 2012, and carried out attacks throughout most of 2013 and 2014. After 2014, the group faced a decline, with many commanders defecting back to Boko Haram or other jihadist groups. Ansaru laid dormant until 2020, emerging again as an ally to bandits in northwestern and central Nigeria, enveloping Kaduna State. In 2022, the group plead allegiance to Al-Qaeda in the Islamic Maghreb (AQIM), and increased its presence in Kaduna State, where some locals called the group peaceful and generous, defending against bandit groups and handing food to Muslims. On 1 April 2022, the Nigerian army killed eleven bandits in Birnin Gwari. Just a day before the attack, Nigerian officials stated plans to bolster security along the Abuja-Kaduna highway.

== Attack ==
On the afternoon of 5 April, Ansaru gunmen, allegedly coming from Niger State, attacked a military base in the Polwire area, near the Kaduna-Birnin Gwari road. A soldier stationed at the base stated that the gunmen arrived on motorbikes, carrying RPGs and other weapons, killing eleven soldiers and injuring four more. The few Nigerian soldiers on staff immediately opened fire, but were quickly overpowered. The attackers looted weapons from the base, and the battle ended about two hours after it began. The surviving Nigerian soldiers were forced to flee the base. A signal sent out from the base during the attack claimed they killed nineteen militants and destroyed a vehicle.

== Aftermath ==
In the days following the attack, all forty soldiers were brought to the army hospital in Kaduna city. Of those, seventeen were confirmed dead, along with a local pro-army vigilante and a civilian. Twenty-three soldiers were injured. The army headquarters in Abuja called the situation immediately following the attack "calm but highly unpredictable." By 7 April, most of the residents of Polwire fled to other towns in Birnin Gwari and Kaduna State. Local officials claimed normalcy began returning to the area.
