= Birnin Gwari Emirate =

Birnin Gwari Masarautar Birnin Gwari
- Town and Emirate
- Birnin Gwari
- Country: Nigeria
- State: Kaduna State
- LGA: Birnin Gwari
- Established: Pre-colonial period

Government
  - Type: Traditional Emirate
  - Emir: Alhaji Zubairu Jibril Maigwari II
- Time zone: UTC+1 (WAT)
- Postal code: 800108
- ISO 3166 code: NG.KD.BG

The Birnin Gwari Emirate is a traditional Hausa-Fulani emirate located in Birnin Gwari Local Government Area of Kaduna State, Nigeria. It is one of the oldest historical entities in the region, known for its rich cultural heritage and long-standing political structure.

== History ==
Birnin Gwari existed as a Hausa settlement and kingdom centuries before colonial rule. It was an important center of commerce, agriculture, and iron-smelting, linking Northern Hausa states to Southern trading communities. Islam and the Sokoto Caliphate In the early 19th century, Birnin Gwari came under the influence of the Fulani Jihad led by Shehu Usman ɗan Fodio. The town became part of the Sokoto Caliphate system, and Fulani rulers were installed to govern it as part of the expanding Islamic emirate structure.

=== Colonial Period ===
During the British colonial era, Birnin Gwari was integrated into the Zaria Province and governed through the Native Authority system. While the emirate's autonomy was reduced, the British maintained the emir's leadership under indirect rule. In 1981, under the military administration of Kaduna State, Birnin Gwari was officially upgraded and recognized as a full-fledged emirate. This decision elevated the traditional ruler from a district head to the status of an emir.

=== Current Status ===
Despite ongoing security challenges in the region, the emirate continues to play a vital role in community governance, conflict resolution, and cultural preservation in Kaduna State.

== Security Challenge ==
Birnin Gwari Emirate, has been one of the regions most affected by the surge in banditry and insurgency in northwestern Nigeria. Over the years, the emirate has witnessed repeated attacks by armed bandits and extremist groups such as Ansaru.

=== 2018 Gwaska Massacre ===
In May 2018, armed bandits attacked Gwaska Village in Birnin Gwari Local Government Area, killing at least 45 people, including children and vigilante defenders. The assailants were heavily armed and set homes ablaze during the raid. The federal government responded by approving a new military battalion and police command to improve security in the area.

=== 2022 Military Base Attack ===
In April 2022, fighters linked to the Islamist group Ansaru attacked a Nigerian military base in Polwire, killing 17 soldiers, 3 vigilantes, and injuring several others. The attack underscored the growing presence of jihadist-linked militants in the region.

=== Bandit attacks ===
In July 2023, bandits killed Muslim cleric Malam Yakubu Bugai and several farmers, and abducted many villagers. In June, three farmers were killed and many kidnapped during a market-day raid. In Katakaki Forest, a clash between vigilantes and bandits resulted in the deaths of 19 vigilantes and an unknown number of bandits.

== See also ==
- Kaduna State
- List of Nigerian traditional states
- Sokoto Caliphate
