= Sani Shuwaram =

Former leader of ISWAP

Commander-in-chief of the Islamic State's West Africa Province
- In office November 2021 – February 2022

Personal details
- Died: February 2022
- Military career
- Allegiance: Islamic State's West Africa Province (Unknown - February 2022)
- Conflicts: Boko Haram insurgency

Sani Shuwaram (died February 2022) was a top commander of the Islamic State's West Africa Province (ISWAP), one of the Islamic State's non-Middle Eastern branches. Non-IS sources claimed that he was sworn in as the wali of ISWAP in November 2021 by one of ISWAP's provincial judges, Bukar Arge, in an ISWAP camp in the village of Kurnawa in the Lake Chad area, Borno State, Nigeria.

Two previous ISWAP top commanders, Abu Musab al-Barnawi and Malam Bako were killed within a few days of one another by the Nigerian Army.

Shuwaram was appointed by Abu Musab al-Barnawi's interim committee following a command directive from the Islamic State's main branch in the Middle East.

Shuwaram was killed in February 2022 by airstrikes by Nigerian Air Force and has been replaced by Bako Gorgore.
