= Battle of Geidam =

2021 battle in Nigeria

- Part of the Boko Haram insurgency
Date	23 April 2021
Location	Geidam, Yobe State, Nigeria
Result	Islamic State victory

Belligerents
Nigeria	Islamic State: West Africa Province

Casualties and losses
3 injured (per Nigeria)	21 killed (per Nigeria)
- 11 killed

On 23 April 2021, militants from the Islamic State – West Africa Province (ISWAP) stormed the town of Geidam, in Yobe State, Nigeria, killing several civilians and sparking a battle with Nigerian armed forces.

== Prelude ==
Geidam is a local government area in northeastern Nigeria, with the village of Jilli in the LGA notably being the site of a Nigerian military base that has defended the town and surrounding areas from Boko Haram. During the Dapchi schoolgirls kidnapping in 2014, locals called the military base in Geidam for help rescuing schoolgirls kidnapped by Boko Haram. In 2018, the Geidam base was attacked by Boko Haram again, killing over 31 soldiers and injuring over 24 others. In 2019, Boko Haram stormed the town of Geidam before attacking the military base, leading to a 12-hour battle and at least eight Nigerian soldiers killed. Boko Haram attacked the town in February 2021, as well.

== Battle ==
ISWAP militants arrived at the town around 5pm of 23 April, as residents were preparing their fast for Ramadan. Around eight ISWAP trucks stormed the town, sparking a battle with Nigerian soldiers located at the military base. However, the militants quickly captured the town. In response, a Nigerian air force jet launched airstrikes on the town on 23 April. A projectile struck houses in the Samunaka neighborhood during the battle, killing 11 civilians, with one survivor stating that "a bomb was thrown into [their] house." ISWAP fighters also destroyed telecommunications in the town, preventing Internet access. The militants withdrew from the town overnight, bringing reinforcements the next day. Residents, along with the Geidam administrator, alleged that Nigerian soldiers prevented Geidam residents from fleeing the town in an attempt to stop ISWAP militants from fleeing as well. Meanwhile, ISWAP fighters wreaked havoc on the town, destroying buildings and property.

After consolidating control of the town, ISWAP fighters distributed pamphlets encouraging residents to join the insurgents. The Nigerian Army also launched a counteroffensive on the town around 25 April called Operation Tura Taikabongo, alleging that 21 ISWAP fighters were killed in air raids. Despite this, ISWAP was able to raise the flag of the Islamic State in several parts of the town, although battles were ongoing between Nigerian soldiers and ISWAP. Three Nigerian soldiers were injured. On 26 April, under Boko Haram control, two people, including a primary school teacher, were beheaded by Boko Haram.

On 27 April, Yobe state governor Buni ordered General Luky Irabo to deploy more soldiers to Geidam LGA. By that same day, ISWAP was still in control of Geidam. On 28 April, ISWAP fighters distributed 20,000 naira to families in an attempt to recruit civilians into their ranks. A refugee from Geidam, speaking to Sahara Reporters, stated tha two Christians were killed by ISWAP during their control of the town.

Later, 150,000 civilians were reported to have fled Geidam.

== Aftermath ==
Following the attack, members of the Nigerian government alleged that Nigerian soldiers knew the attack was coming but didn't act on it. One Nigerian representative, representing Geidam, stated that ISWAP was able to capture the town in one day. By June, Nigerian special forces were deployed inside Geidam.

Yobe State governor Mai Mala Buni condemned the attack on Geidam.
