= Rann bombing =

Bombing by the Nigerian Air Force

- Part of the Boko Haram insurgency
- Type: Airstrike
- Location: Rann, Borno State, Nigeria; 12.2701°N 14.4636°E
- Target: Boko Haram
- Date: 17 January 2017
- Executed by: (Nigeria) Nigerian Air Force
- Casualties: 115 (confirmed) killed 100–200 injured
- Location of Rann within Nigeria

On 17 January 2017, a Nigerian Air Force jet mistakenly bombed an internally displaced persons camp near the Cameroonian border in Rann, Borno State. They had believed it was a Boko Haram encampment. The bombing left at least 115 people dead, including six Red Cross aid workers, and left more than 100 injured.

== Background ==
Boko Haram is a jihadist group of insurgents that demands Sharia law in Nigeria. They have been active in the Rann area, and Nigeria's military had mounted an offensive in 2016 that forced the group out. However, Boko Haram fighters returned after the region's rainy season ended, allowing them to travel more easily, and in December had attacked a military facility in the area.

== Incident ==
Early reporting said that the Nigerian military had received information that Boko Haram forces were gathering in preparation for an attack on a military target. Major General Lucky Irabor, the commander of Nigerian forces fighting Boko Haram in northeastern Nigeria, said that he had ordered an airstrike on the location where the militants were believed to be gathering.

The airstrike took place sometime during the day—reports varied from about 09:00 local time to early in the afternoon —and left at least dozens dead. According to Médecins Sans Frontières (MSF), which operated in the bombed camp, at least 50 people had been killed, while an official from Borno working in the recovery effort told the Associated Press that at least 100 were dead. A Red Cross spokesman said that six of its aid workers were among the dead. MSF said that up to 200 had been injured, with more expected to die overnight due to limited medical facilities and doctors in the remote area, and large scale rescue forces not expected to arrive until 18 January. On 18 January 2017, a Red Cross statement said that the number of dead stood at about 70, with 90 or more wounded remaining in Rann, 46 of whom were "severely injured". On 20 January, MSF said that they had confirmed 90 fatalities, and had received local reports that the final toll could be up to 170. An emergency services official in Nigeria said on 24 January that the number of dead had reached 115 confirmed; while other reports had said that 236 were killed, the official said that the larger number was the total of dead and injured.

In 2022, The Intercept published a report on documents obtained through the Freedom of Information Act that suggested that the American military had provided the Nigerian military with intelligence support ahead of the airstrike. In the documents, the United States Africa Command ordered a formal investigation into the airstrike, calling it part of "U.S.-Nigerian operations."

== Response ==
The United Nations (UN) and Red Cross jointly deployed a helicopter mission carrying medical personnel and 400 kilograms (880 lb) of supplies, which arrived late on the 17th and evacuated eight Red Cross workers. Additional UN helicopters deployed to aid in evacuations, while MSF said that its workers in Chad and Cameroon were preparing to receive the victims once they had been stabilized for transport from Rann. Some of the injured were airlifted to Maiduguri.

General Irabor, conceding for the first time in the fighting against Boko Haram that a government attack had resulted in civilian casualties, said that "[u]nfortunately, the strike was conducted, but it turned out that other civilians were somewhere around the area and they were affected", while President Muhammadu Buhari said that the incident had been a "regrettable operational mistake". The military planned to begin an investigation into the actions of the pilot flying the mission and the commanders involved in order to determine whether the airstrike had been an operational error. The Chief of the Air Staff, Air Marshal Sadique Abubakar, called the event a "very tragic and unfortunate incident" and promised a thorough investigation. On 24 January, an Air Force spokesman said that the investigation would be concluded by 2 February, though he did not say whether the military would release its findings.

Mausi Segun, a member of the Human Rights Watch in Nigeria, said that regardless of intent, the group considered the bombing a crime, saying that "[e]ven if there is no evidence of a willful attack on the camp, which would be a war crime, the camp was bombed indiscriminately, violating international humanitarian law."

Hugues Robert of MSF said "This was a very densely populated place that was full of civilians who already lived there and internally displaced persons who had come there," while The Economist criticized the bombing for occurring in the camp even though it was under army control at the time.
