= Bodo, Cameroon =

Bodo
- Village
- Location in Cameroon
- Coordinates: 12.3599055°N 14.4719655°E
- Country: Cameroon
- Province: Far North Region
- Department: Logone-et-Chari
- Commune: Makary

Bodo is a village in the Far North Region of Cameroon, adjacent to the border with Nigeria.

== History ==
Bodo is one of the settlements in Far North that is badly affected by jihadist group Boko Haram's insurgency which originated in neighboring Nigeria in 2009. They started attacking Cameroon (along with Chad and Niger) in the mid-2010s. Bodo is just across the border which is only marked by a small river. Suicide bombers and raiders have repeatedly attacked the village, resulting in locals setting up a self-defense group. The most deadly attack in the village took place on 25 January 2016, when Bodo was struck by four female Boko Haram suicide bombers. They had disguised themselves as traders, and managed to circumvent the local self-defense fighters by using the dusty Harmattan winds to their advantage. The bombers then detonated themselves on the village's market, killing 35 people and wounding 70. The government responded by launching an attack on a suspected insurgent base at nearby Achigashia, and by closing all border markets to prevent further similar attacks.

After Boko Haram fighters overran the town of Rann in Borno State, northeastern Nigeria on 14 January 2019, about 8,000 of its inhabitants fled across the border to Bodo. Humanitarian groups set up a refugee camp to accommodate the arrivals. Regardless, Cameroonian authorities forced all but 1,500 refugees to go back to Nigeria after a few days.

== See also ==
- List of municipalities of Cameroon
