= Garin Giwa ambush =

2020 ambush in Nigeria

- Part of the Boko Haram insurgency
| Date | 2 September 2020 |
| Location | Garin Giwa, Kukawa LGA, Borno State, Nigeria |
| Result | ISWAP victory |

Belligerents
| Nigeria | ISWAP al-Barnawi |

Commanders and leaders
| Unknown | Umar Lene |

Casualties and losses
| 10 killed 5+ injured Several missing | Unknown |

On 2 September 2020, jihadists from Islamic State – West Africa Province (ISWAP) ambushed Nigerian soldiers near the village of Garin Giwa, Kukawa, Borno State, Nigeria.

== Background ==
In 2016, Boko Haram leadership deposed longtime leader Abubakar Shekau and appointed Abu Musab al-Barnawi as the head of the group. Barnawi pledged allegiance to the Islamic State, and reformed the group into Islamic State – West Africa Province (ISWAP) while Shekau created his own splinter faction of Boko Haram. On the day prior to the ambush in Garin Giwa, ten soldiers were killed during a routine patrol in Magumeri, in Nigeria's Borno State, by al-Barnawi's faction of ISWAP.

== Ambush ==
The ambush in Garin Giwa was carried out by Umar Lene, a prominent ISWAP commander, and two sub-commanders while Nigerian soldiers were on patrol in Garin Giwa's town center. Fighting broke out between the surprised Nigerian troops and the jihadists, and lasted for thirty minutes before ISWAP fighters fled on two seized pick-up trucks. Ten Nigerian special forces soldiers were killed immediately in the attack, and several soldiers were missing. Five wounded soldiers were brought to Mile 4, where Nigerian soldiers had control of the area, and Nigerian army sources claimed other soldiers were injured. The bodies of the slain soldiers were taken to Maiduguri.

The al-Barnawi faction of ISWAP claimed responsibility for the ambush at Garin Giwa that same day.
