= Kuje prison break =

2022 prison break in Abuja, Nigeria

Coordinates: 9.06°N 7.49°E

- Part of the Boko Haram insurgency
Date	5 July 2022
Location	Kuje prison, Abuja, Nigeria
Result	Islamist victory: 879 inmates escape; Over half of the escaped inmates are caught by the end of the week

Belligerents
Nigeria	ISWAP; Ansaru

Strength
65 prison guards and soldiers	~100

Casualties and losses
1 killed 3+ injured	4 killed 13+ injured

On 5 July 2022, the Islamic State launched a coordinated attack on Kuje prison, near the Nigerian capital of Abuja. The attack killed five people and freed 879 inmates, although almost half were recaptured in the following days.

== Prelude ==
Kuje prison is one of the largest prisons in Abuja, and in the months leading up to the attack, over 5,000 prisoners had been released in prison breaks orchestrated by various militant groups. On the day of the attack, there were 65 military, police, and prison guards on guard at the prison. Prior to the attack, 994 prisoners were registered as serving time in Kuje. Some of the prisoners included high-profile suspects such as former top Nigerian police officer Abba Kyari, indicted in a money laundering operation, along with 68 convicted Islamic State and Boko Haram militants. There was also no CCTV footage in the prison prior to the attack. A former Boko Haram detainee speaking to Institute for Security Studies stated that he was in contact with ISWAP members outside the jail through cellphones, and that they "communicated easily."

== Attack ==
On the night of 5 July, Islamic State militants, with the aid of Ansaru, launched three simultaneous attacks on different sides of the prison. Immediately before the breakout, imprisoned ISIS leaders gave a 15-minute long sermon to other members of the group. Using small arms and explosive devices, around 100 attackers broke in, destroying parts of the prison and burning eight vehicles. One bomb at the front gates killed a Nigerian prison guard and injured three others, and four inmates were killed during the attack. Overall, a total of 16 officers and inmates were injured in the attack. Of the 994 present at the time of the attack, 879 inmates broke out, however 443 had been recaptured by the following day. Many high-profile members were still unaccounted for in the days following the jailbreak, including Kyari, Joshua Dariye and Jolly Nyame, former governors of Plateau and Taraba states respectively. The attack took 50 minutes from start to finish.

== Aftermath ==
By 8 July 443 inmates were still on the loose. In the aftermath, Major General Bashir Magashi released photos of 69 high-profile inmates still unaccounted for, including many members of Boko Haram. This number was bumped down to 64 in the following days. The Islamic State claimed responsibility for the attack on the day of the raid, calling it the "Breaking the Walls campaign".

Abba Kyari was recaptured on 20 July. A political leader in Plateau State, Elkanah Garang, called for the immediate release of some suspects, as they had been pardoned by Nigerian president Muhammadu Buhari earlier in the year. Buhari had claimed to release a detailed report on the attack in November, although this did not happen.
