= Battle of Lake Chad =

Battle between islamic terrorist groups

- Part of the Boko Haram insurgency and the Camp Holocaust campaign
Date	5 November – 8 November 2025
Location	Northern Borno State, Nigeria
Result	Boko Haram victory
Territorial changes	Boko Haram overruns several ISWAP‑held settlements

Belligerents
Boko Haram	Islamic State

Commanders and leaders
(Islamic State) Hassan Buduma (Islamic State) Mohd Hassan	Unknown

Units involved
Boko Haram	West Africa Province

Strength
Dozens of armed boats	10 armed boats

Casualties and losses
4 killed	170–200 killed

The Battle of Lake Chad was waged between 5 and 8 November 2025 on Lake Chad in Nigeria's Borno State between rival jihadist groups of Boko Haram and the Islamic State – West Africa Province (ISWAP). The clashes were described as a "turf war".

== Background ==
Since ISWAP's formal split as a splinter group from Boko Haram in 2016, the two groups have been in a territorial intra-jihadist conflict over influence in the Lake Chad region. In years prior to the battle, the conflict in the Chad Basin was worsening, with ISWAP holding control of the islands within the lake since 2021 as part of its Camp Holocaust campaign. Their hold over these territories occurred around May 2021, when ISWAP attacked the Sambisa Forest, a stronghold of Boko Haram.

In mid-2025, numerous military bases and outposts belonging to Cameroon, Chad, Niger, and Nigeria's Multinational Joint Task Force (MNJTF) located within the Chad Basin were described as "soft targets for attacks" by ISWAP. The understaffed and remote positions were vulnerable to the group's shifting tactics towards nighttime raids with light firearms and drone bombings. Attacks by ISWAP were on the rise. By September 2025, ISWAP's victories were being challenged by Boko Haram, whose resurgence was attributed to the MNJTF's focus on ISWAP and failures of disarmament, demobilization, and reintegration (DDR) programs. Boko Haram's tactics in attacking military positions echoed those of ISWAP.

== Battle ==
Between 5 and 8 November 2025, Boko Haram fighters launched a naval invasion against ISWAP bases across the various islands in Lake Chad. The attacks were led by Hassan Buduma and Mohd Hassan and used dozens of fighters armed with heavy weapons on motorised boats. Military forces reported that "most of the deceased are believed to be ISWAP members," with the clashes leaving at least 4 Boko Haram attackers dead and between 170 and 200 ISWAP members killed.

Boko Haram successfully seized several ISWAP bases and their weaponry, surviving militants retreated to their mainland positions in the villages of Ali Jillimari, Metele, Kangarwa, and Gudumbali in northern Borno State, Nigeria. Only three of ISWAP’s boats managed to escape, seven others were captured alongside their arms and ammunition.

== Aftermath ==
In the aftermath of the battle, the Nigerian Air Force launched a series of airstrikes on ISWAP positions on 9 November, targeting the Lake Chad Basin, as well as several other states in northern Nigeria.

== See also ==
- Battle of Sambisa Forest
