= Chad Basin campaign (2018–2020) =

Series of battles and offensives in the Chad Basin

- Part of the Boko Haram insurgency
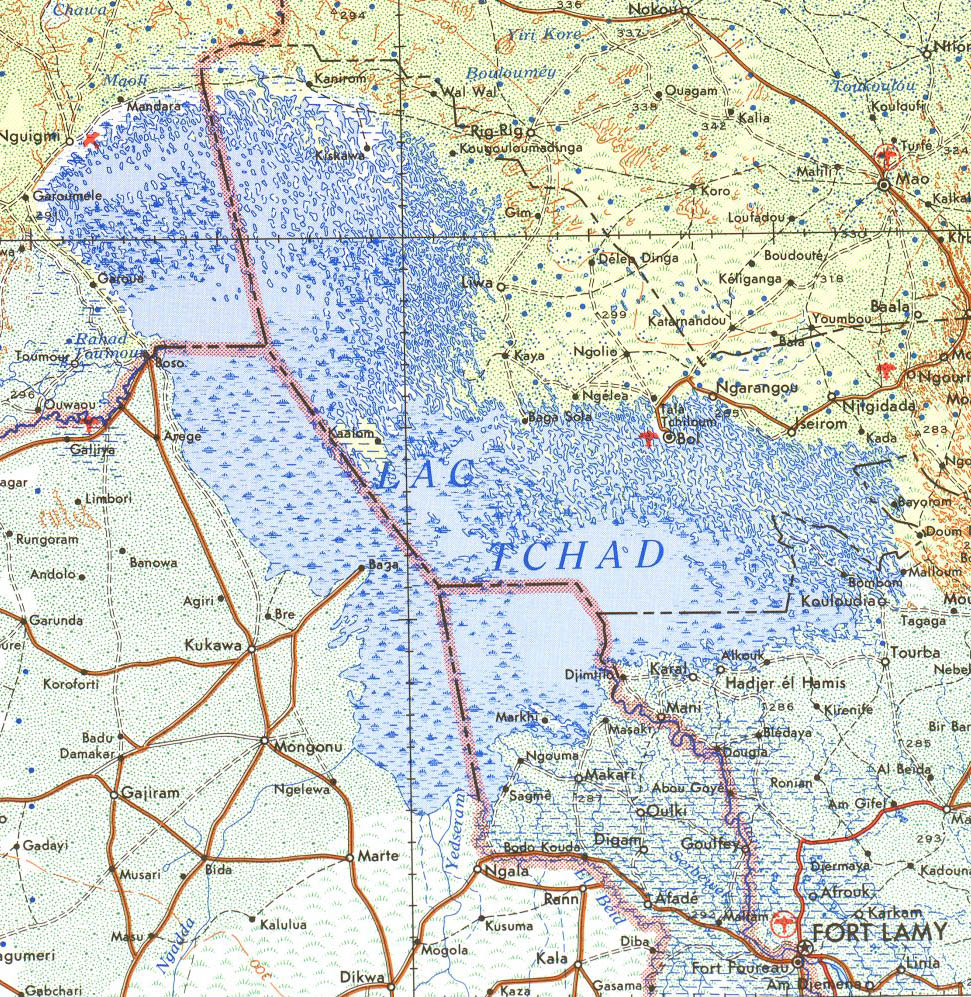
- Map of Lake Chad and surroundings in 1973, including many locations that were targeted by insurgents in late 2018 and early 2019
Date	November 2018 – February 2020
Location	Southern Chad Basin (mostly northeastern Nigeria)
Result	Partial Multinational Joint Task Force victory: Much territory is retaken from rebel forces; Insurgents retain significant presence in the Chad Basin; ISWAP experiences extensive leadership struggles, resulting in the successive purges of two leaders and several sub-commanders
Territorial changes	ISWAP retains control of some settlements in Borno State

Belligerents
Multinational Joint Task Force (MJTF): Nigeria; Niger; Cameroon; Chad; Self-defense militias	Islamic State: West Africa Province (ISWAP); Boko Haram

Commanders and leaders
Mansur Dan Ali (Nigerian Defense Minister); Lt. Gen. Tukur Buratai Jon Walsh (Nigerian chief of army staff) (Cameroon) Joseph Beti Assomo (Cameroonian Defense Minister) (Cameroon) Lt. Gen. René Claude Meka (Cameroonian defense chief of staff) (Chad) Daoud Yaya Brahim (Chadian Defense Minister) (Chad) Taher Erda (Chadian chief of general staff) (Nigeria) Maj. Gen. Chikezie Ude (MJTF chief) (Nigeria) Maj. Gen. Olufemi Akinjobi (Operation Yancin Tafki Land Component commander)	Abu Musab al-Barnawi (WIA) (until March 2019); Ba Idrisa ("Abu Abdullah Idris ibn Umar al-Barnawi") (MIA) (from March 2019); Bo Lawan ("Lawan Abubakar"); Mustapha Kirmimma (MIA); Mohammad Bashir (executed); Mustapha Jere (executed); Ali Abdullahi (executed); Baba Mayinta (executed) Abubakar Shekau; Man Chari †; Bakura Doro

Units involved
Nigerian Armed Forces; Niger Armed Forces; Cameroon Armed Forces; Military of Chad	Military of ISIL: Several brigades; Inghimasi; Boko Haram forces: "Bakura Faction"

Strength
Thousands; Numerous aircraft	ISWAP: c. 3,000–3,500 (2018 estimate); 5,000–18,000 (2019 estimate) Boko Haram: c. 1,000–1,500 (estimate)

Casualties and losses
Hundreds killed Much war materiel destroyed or captured	Hundreds killed Many vehicles destroyed or captured
- Hundreds of civilians killed, hundreds of thousands displaced

The Chad Basin campaign of 2018–2020 was a series of battles and offensives in the southern Chad Basin, particularly northeastern Nigeria, which took place amid the ongoing Boko Haram insurgency. The Chad Basin witnessed an upsurge of insurgent activity from early November 2018, as rebels belonging to the Islamic State's West Africa Province (ISWAP) and Boko Haram launched offensives and several raids to regain military strength and seize territory in a renewed attempt to establish an Islamic state in the region. These attacks, especially those by ISWAP, met with considerable success and resulted in the displacement of hundreds of thousands of civilians. The member states of the Multinational Joint Task Force (MJTF), namely Nigeria, Niger, Chad and Cameroon, responded to the increased insurgent activity with counter-offensives. These operations repulsed the rebels in many areas but failed to fully contain the insurgency.

== Background ==
The Salafi jihadist Boko Haram movement launched an insurgency against the Nigerian government following an unsuccessful uprising in 2009. Supported by several other Jihadist groups such as al-Qaeda, the group aimed at establishing an Islamic state in northern Nigeria. Boko Haram greatly increased its power and territorial holdings in the Chad Basin in 2014, and its de facto leader Abubakar Shekau consequently attempted to increase his international standing among Islamists by allying with the prominent Islamic State of Iraq and the Levant (ISIL). Boko Haram thus became the "Islamic State's West Africa Province" (ISWAP).

When the insurgents were subsequently defeated and lost almost all of their lands during the 2015 West African offensive by the Multinational Joint Task Force (MJTF), a coalition of Nigeria, Chad, Niger, and Cameroon, discontent grew among the rebels. Shekau had always refused to fully submit to ISIL's central command, and the latter consequently removed him as leader of ISWAP in August 2016. Shekau responded by breaking with ISIL's central command, but many of the rebels actually stayed loyal to ISIL. As result, the rebel movement split into a Shekau-loyal faction ("Jama'at Ahl al-sunna li-l-Da'wa wa-l-Jihad", generally known as "Boko Haram"), and a pro-ISIL faction led by Abu Musab al-Barnawi (which continued to call itself "Islamic State's West Africa Province"). These two groups have since clashed with each other, though it is possible that they still occasionally cooperate against their common enemies, namely the local governments. In addition, Shekau did never officially renounce his pledge of allegiance to ISIL as a whole; his forces are thus occasionally regarded as "second branch of ISWAP". Overall, the relation of Shekau with ISIL remains confused and ambiguous. As the Islamist rebels were driven back into more remote areas and became embroiled in infighting, local governments claimed that the insurgency had been defeated.

=== Prelude ===
After their massive losses in 2015, Barnawi's ISWAP and Shekau's Boko Haram both reconsolidated, though ISWAP grew into the more powerful group. Whereas Shekau had about 1,000 to 1,500 fighters under his command by late 2018, the Islamic State loyalists counted about 3,000 to 3,500 troops. Furthermore, ISWAP displayed signs of increasing sophistication and growing connections to ISIL's core group. Barnawi's followers did not just align ideologically with ISIL, but also adopted its technologies and tactics. They began using suicide vehicle-borne improvised explosive devices and drones which experts considered proofs of support and advice by exiled ISIL members from Syria and Iraq. In addition, ISWAP deviated from Shekau's brutal and autocratic leadership style by organzining a powerful shura or committee that gave the group an element of "democracy". As result, ISWAP gained more popular support, yet also became more prone to leadership struggles.

As ISWAP grew closer to its parent organization, it also became more hardline in its policies, resulting in a renewed internal struggles. Following the Dapchi schoolgirls kidnapping in February 2018, ISIL central command ordered the purge of Mamman Nur and his followers within ISWAP. Although Nur was a close ally of Barnawi and had risen to the de facto leader of ISWAP (with Barnawi serving as figurehead), the order was carried out, and Nur killed by his comrades. As he was believed to be a moderate, Nur's death was interpreted as sign that ISWAP was directed by the ISIL central leadership to fully restart its war against the local governments which resulted in the Chad Basin campaign from late 2018. Furthermore, ISWAP and Boko Haram agreed to a ceasefire, allowing both groups to focus yet again on their insurgency.

It has also been speculated that ISWAP decided to become more aggressive in order to prevent al-Qaeda affiliate Jama'at Nasr al-Islam wal Muslimin from gaining influence in Nigeria, especially as another Islamic State faction in West Africa (namely the "Islamic State in the Greater Sahara") had lost numerous of its fighters to defections to al-Qaeda.

== Campaign ==
=== Insurgent offensives ===
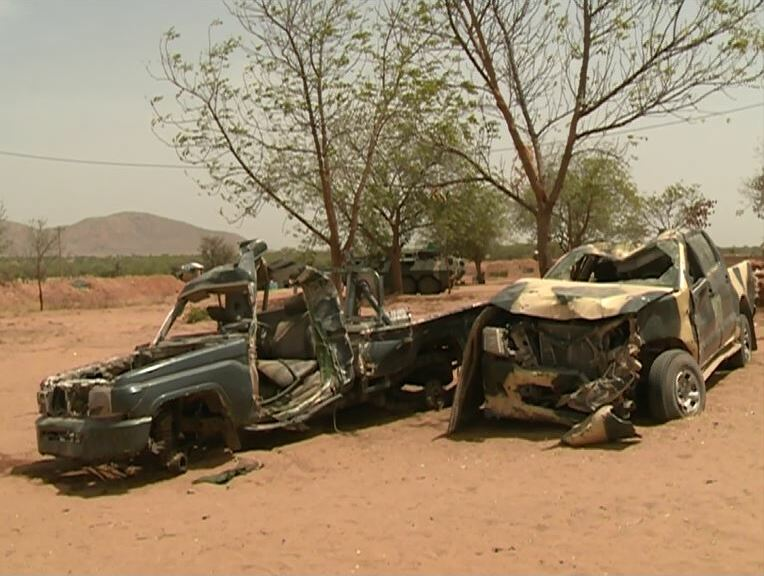
Boko Haram vehicles which were destroyed by the Cameroonian military in Amchide in December 2018.

ISWAP began to launch a series of intense attacks on Nigerian Army positions near Lake Chad from early November 2018, scoring a number of victories (most notably near Metele) and killing over a hundred government troops between 18 and 22 November. Following the success of these raids, ISWAP overran and captured the village of Kangarwa near Lake Chad, where it also seized military equipment such as one tank. Though Kangarwa is a small settlement, and strategically not important, it demonstrated the militants' ability to still conquer and hold territory. Insurgents also launched several raids into Niger in course of November, kidnapping about a dozen girls from border villages. Shekau's Boko Haram launched at least one major attack in November, raiding a military base in Borno State. Rebel forces also targeted some villages in northern Cameroon, prompting local authorities to reactivate a number of village self-defense militias.

The Islamic State fighters continued their offensive in Borno State by attacking and reportedly capturing Arege on 30 November after a failed attempt two days earlier, and also launched further raids on Nigerian Army positions. Military bases which were attacked, though not captured by ISWAP, included Gambaru (1 December), Buni Gari (3 December), Mallam Fatori (3 December), and Gudumbali (4 and 14 December). In contrast, ISWAP managed to capture the villages of Cross Kauwa, Kukawa, Kekeno, and Bunduram sometime in December, and also overran a base at Mairari on 17 December, though retreated from it shortly afterward. Meanwhile, Shekau's Boko Haram also increased its attacks, though to a lesser extent than ISWAP, and began to greatly increase its propaganda output.

ISWAP attacked the harbor town of Baga at the shore of Lake Chad on the night of 26–27 December, and overran its garrison after heavy fighting. The local military base was plundered, the local Multinational Joint Task Force (MJTF) headquarters destroyed, and the naval base set aflame, while the militants managed to take control of tanks, APCs, boats, and much other equipment. Hundreds of local civilians fled the town after the takeover, even though the rebels had pledged to leave the local civilians alone. With the fall of Baga, rebels controlled most of Lake Chad's shoreline. The MJTF troops that survived the attack on Baga retreated to another harbor base at Fish Dam in Monguno. Militants launched three attacks on Monguno on 29–30 December, though these were repulsed.

At the same time, the MJTF member states began to prepare counter-offensives in order to push the insurgents back. The Nigerian Army was preparing a counter-attack to retake Baga by 31 December, though ISWAP still held the town by mid-February 2019. In contrast, an offensive by Niger reportedly met with more success. The Niger Armed Forces began to target islands on Lake Chad, and the area along the Yobe River at the Niger-Nigeria border from 28 December. While the Niger Army advanced on the ground, the Niger Air Force launched intense airstrikes, with the Nigerien government claiming to have killed 287 rebels by 2 January 2019. The Cameroonian Armed Forces also mobilized their troops in the north to counter the Islamist rebels.

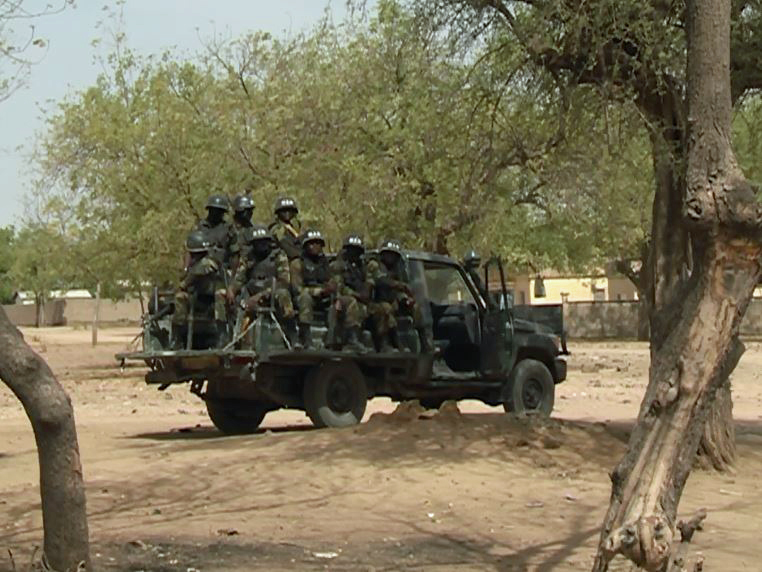
Soldiers of the Cameroonian Rapid Intervention Battalion in Maroua during counter-insurgency operations on 17 January 2019

On 13 January, ISWAP attacked a military base near Magumeri. On the following day, Shekau's Boko Haram attacked the refugee town of Rann which had been reportedly abandoned by its Nigerian garrison shortly before. The insurgents proceeded to destroy much of the settlement, including local clinics, causing much of the local civilian population to flee, with about 9,000 crossing the border and relocating to Bodo in Cameroon. ISWAP also raided Gajiram on 16 January. In the next days, the Nigerian Army and Cameroonian Armed Forces retook Rann. Authorities consequently forced most of the refugees who had fled to Cameroon to return to Nigeria. On 23 January, the Cameroonian military retreated from Rann, whereupon the Nigerian soldiers also withdrew, as they considered the town undefendable without Cameroonian help. About 35,000 residents of Rann promptly fled, believing that Boko Haram would surely return with the government troops gone. Most relocated to Goura in Cameroon, and this time the authorities allowed them to stay. As expected, Boko Haram indeed raided Rann after its garrison had left, setting the settlement ablaze, and murdering 60 people, including the local elders. More people subsequently fled, with about 60,000 being displaced in the region by early February. Overall, 39 insurgent attacks were recorded in Nigeria's Borno and Yobe States in January 2019, while five attacks took place in Cameroon from 1 to 22 January.

A series of clashes between the Nigerian military and ISWAP occurred near Mallam Fatori at the Nigerian-Nigerien border in early February, with both sides claiming to have inflicted heavy casualties on their opponents. From 14 to 16 February, insurgents launched a number of major attacks, targeting Maiduguri, Buni Yadi in Yobe State, and the border village of Chetima Wangou in Niger. Whereas the rebels managed to capture a military base near Maiduguri, the assaults on Buni Yadi and Chetima Wangou were reportedly repelled amid heavy insurgent casualties, including several military vehicles.

=== Operation Yancin Tafki ===
==== Initial government successes and deposition of Abu Musab al-Barnawi as ISWAP leader ====
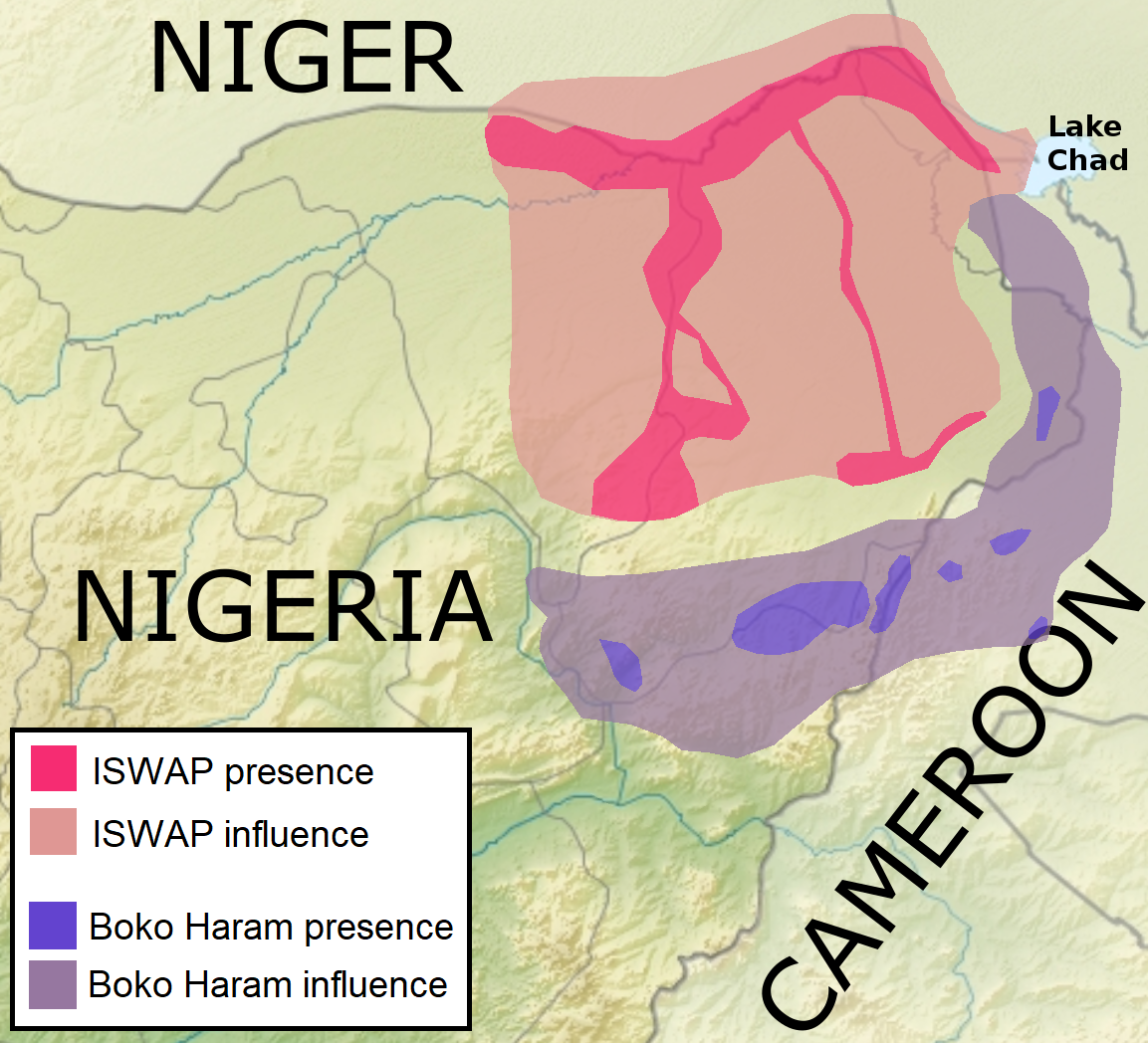
Presence and influence of ISWAP and Boko Haram in northern Nigeria, Cameroon, and Niger in early 2019

Around 21 February 2019, the MJTF coalition launched an offensive codenamed Operation Yancin Tafki around Lake Chad in order to drive the rebels back, and destroy their bases in the Lake Chad region. As part of this operation, about 500 Chadian soldiers entered Nigeria to assist the Nigerian military in its home areas. Nevertheless, terror attacks and continued offensive operations by the insurgents greatly hindered the general elections in northeastern Nigeria on 23 February 2019. Most notably, ISWAP fired several Grad rockets at Magumeri, and launched an unsuccessful attack on Geidam, while Boko Haram assaulted Gwoza. Several other, smaller clashes also took place on 23 February.

As part of Operation Yancin Tafki, MJTF increasingly began to apply pressure on the insurgents around Lake Chad from late February. The air forces of the coalition states struck several rebel camps and vehicles around Lake Chad, reportedly weakening ISWAP significantly. Insurgent "logistics bases" near Dorou (west of Damasak), Arege, Abadam, Dagaya, Tumbum Gini, and Tumbun Rego had reportedly been destroyed by 11 March 2019. Heavy fighting also took place along the Nigerian-Nigerien border, as ISWAP troops attacked Gueskerou and the Niger Armed Forces responded with counter-attacks near Lake Chad. At the same time, reports emerged according to which Abu Musab al-Barnawi had been deposed as governor of ISWAP, and been replaced by Ba Idrisa (better known by his alias "Abu Abdullah Idris ibn Umar al-Barnawi"). The leadership change was initially not confirmed by either the Islamic State or ISWAP, leading to speculation about whether the reports were true, and why Abu Musab al-Barnawi had been deposed. MJTF claimed that his dismissal was the result of the successes of Operation Yancin Tafki. MNJTF Chief of Military Public Information Col. Timothy Antigha also argued that the coalition's intense air attacks had greatly damaged the insurgents' supply lines as well as undermined their morale. It was later confirmed that Abu Musab al-Barnawi had been demoted to shura member, though the reasoning behind his deposition as ISWAP leader remained unclear.

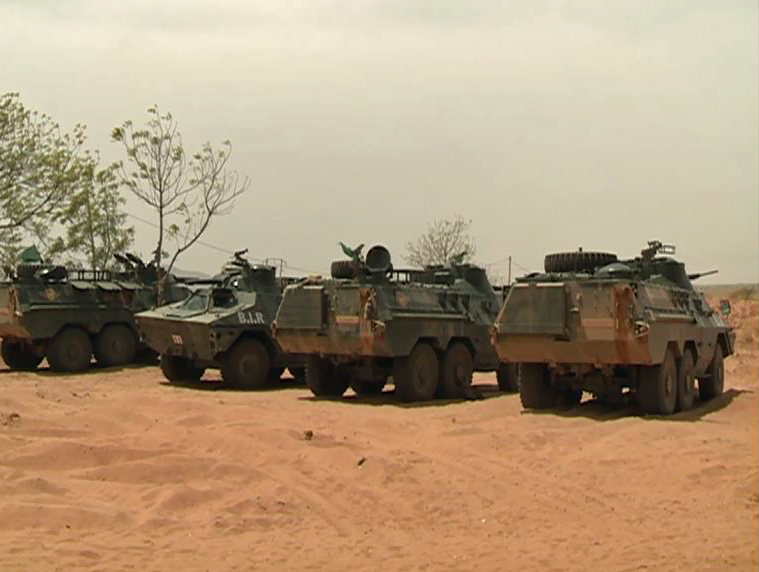
Rapid Intervention Battalion Ratel IFVs in Maroua, January 2019

Despite suffering several defeats and the leadership change in February and March, ISWAP did not become passive. It continued to launch offensive operations and counter-attacks, and still achieved a number of minor victories against the security forces. The Islamic State forces also became more active in Niger in course of March, repeatedly attacking Diffa, Toumour, and smaller villages. About 18,480 people were displaced due to these attacks, while the overall number of refugees in the wider Diffa region rose to 250,000, half of them Nigerians who had fled the violence in their home country. Following the Battle of Baghuz Fawqani's official end on 23 March, ISIL affiliates around the world launched a "Vengeance for Sham" campaign. ISWAP took part in the revenge campaign as well, bombarding Diffa with Grad rockets in late March and early April. The Islamic State loyalists also attacked and destroyed a military base at the village of Miringa in Borno State on 27 March, though Nigerian soldiers were able to fend off an assault on the village itself.

On 4 April, the United Nations Office for the Coordination of Humanitarian Affairs warned of a "rapid deterioration of the security situation" in the Lake Chad region. Insurgents launched numerous raids in Nigeria, Niger, Chad, and Cameroon in April. These included minor attacks on checkpoints, suicide bombings, and larger cross-border operations involving inghimasi elite fighters. Notable rebel raids targeted Diffa, Bohama in Lac Province and Tchakamari in the Far North Region. At the same time, coalition forces continued their counter-insurgency campaign. One major joint Nigerian-Chadian operation aimed at evicting insurgents from the Ngala-Gamboru area in Borno State, where they had reportedly sought refuge after retreating from advancing government forces. Heavy clashes took place at the villages of Wulgo, Tumbuma, Chikun Gudu and Bukar Maryam, with the coalition claiming that they had won a victory. About 2,000 civilians were forcibly relocated from Jakana near Maiduguri by the Nigerian Army. Officials declared that this was part of preparations for offensive operations against ISWAP routes between their bases in Buni Yadi (Yobe) and Benisheikh forest (Borno). Fighting also continued in the area around Cross Kauwa on 15–16 April, with both sides claiming to have eliminated enemy vehicles and troops.

==== Renewed rebel offensives ====
On 25 April, Nigerian Defense Minister Mansur Dan Ali declared that "the Boko Haram terror network has been overwhelmed and the leadership structure is presently decimated". Analyst Andrew McGregor commented this claim by noting that "despite the Nigerian Army's repeated claims of imminent victory, villagers and forest workers continue to be slaughtered" by the insurgents. Two days later, ISWAP launched a major attack on the military base at Mararrabar Kimba, using motorcycles, 12 technicals as well as three armoured personnel carriers. The Nigerian defenders were overrun, and forced to retreat, whereupon the rebels captured much military equipment and withdrew with their loot. By late April, analysts estimated that ISWAP had grown to between 5,000 and 18,000 fighters, and had begun to raise taxes around Lake Chad.

In early May, ISWAP attacked the town of Gajiganna, Borno, where it destroyed the local barracks before retreating. In the same month, Shekau's Boko Haram faction initiated a series of attacks near Lake Chad, targeting Bama, Banki, Ngom, Tungunshe, and Maiduguri. These operations, far north of Shekau's traditional base of power, were possibly the first ones carried out by the newly organized "Bakura Faction", a Boko Haram sub-unit led by Bakura Doro. Bakura served as Shekau's amir ul-fiya (zone commander) of Lake Chad and had earned a "reputation for shrewdness and independence". In June, ISWAP launched a series of attacks around Lake Chad, targeting Nigerian and Chadian forces. In response, the Chadian government decided to restore a "red zone" in Lac Region where it had previously banned fishing and grazing. This "red zone" had been intended to separate the rebels from the population and reduced their access to food, yet had been allowed to lapse. On 25 May, Shekau's Boko Haram faction released a video eulogizing dead fighters, one of whom was Man Chari (alias "Abu Sadiq al-Bamawi"). Chari had been a high-ranking commander and long-time Shekau loyalist; analyst Jacob Zenn argued that Chari had probably been killed in combat.

In September, rebels launched several raids against villages and military posts along the Nigerian-Cameroonian border. Many civilians and several soldiers were killed, while the insurgents retreated with captured livestock, weapons, and ammunition. Cameroon's chief of defense staff General René Claude Meka responded by shifting more troops to the border. The sporadic border raids into Cameroon were continuing as of December 2019. By this time, the Cameroonian government declared that "122 Boko Haram terrorists" had surrendered to Cameroonian security forces in the course of 2019.

By February 2020, Operation Yancin Tafki was concluded, and the 1,200 Chadian troops which had been operating in Nigeria as part of the operation were withdrawn. Nigerian Chief of Army Staff Lt. Gen. Tukur Buratai declared that the insurgent forces had been driven back to a large degree. Though admitting that the rebels remained active, he downplayed the latter's more recent successes as being part of a "minimal resurgence". Heavy fighting continued, however, as Nigerian forces began an assault on Baga to retake it from ISWAP. Meanwhile, ISWAP began to experience extensive internal struggles, as its commander Ba Idrisa was deposed. Bo Lawan (alias "Lawan Abubakar") succeeded him, and promptly purged ISWAP's shura of suspected dissenters, reportedly imprisoning Ba Idrisa and four top commanders loyal to him, namely Mohammad Bashir, Mustapha Jere, Ali Abdullahi, and Baba Mayinta. Unidentified sources claimed that ISWAP experienced a mutiny on 26–27 February that resulted in the execution of the five imprisoned commanders, the desertation of another commander, Mustapha Kirmimma, while former ISWAP leader Abu Musab al-Barnawi was shot in the confusion, his fate initially unclear. However, this information remained unverifiable.

== Aftermath ==
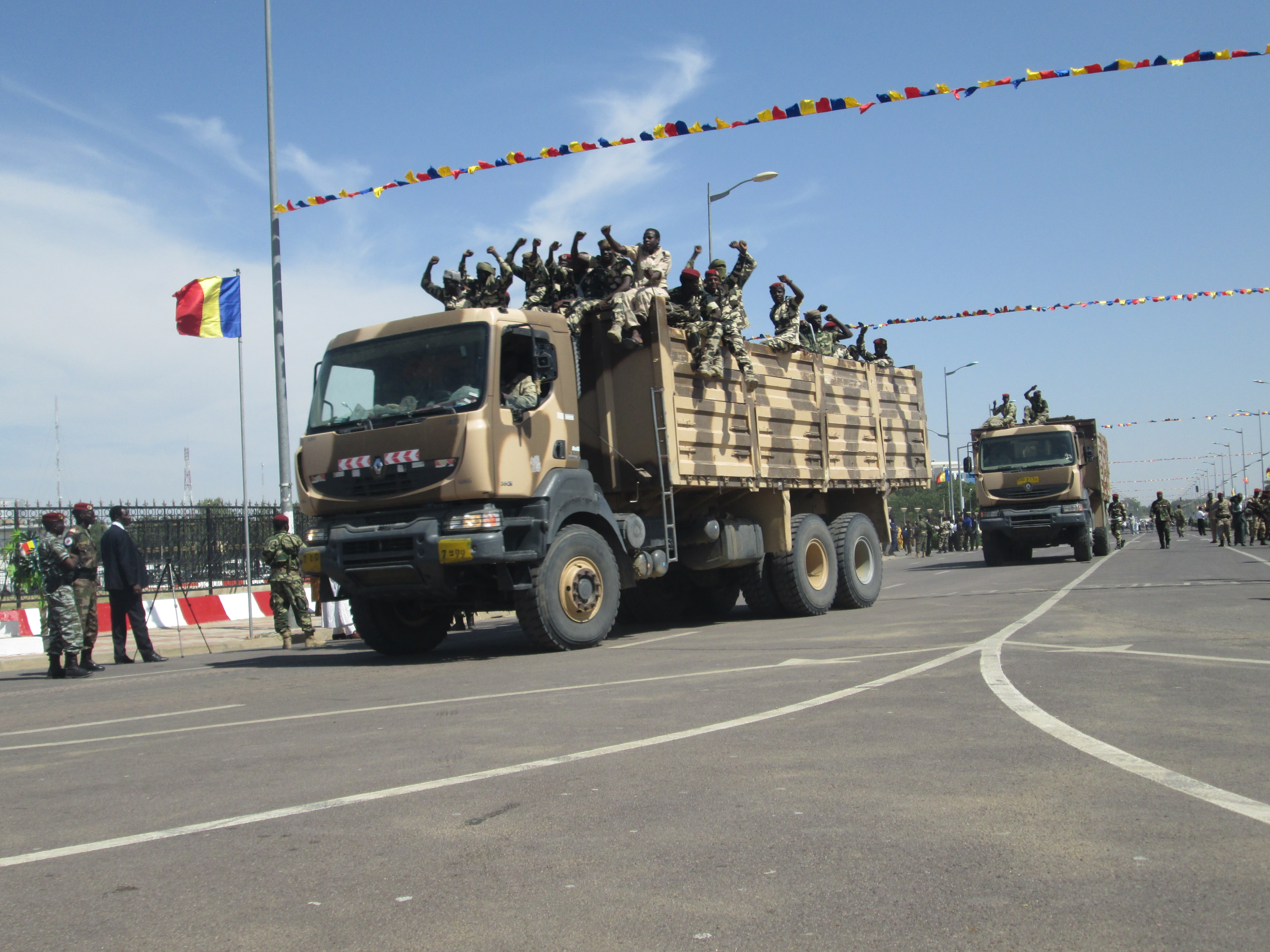
Chadian troops return to N'Djamena on 13 April 2020 after having taken part in Operation Boma's Wrath

Despite the infighting among its forces, ISWAP remained operational and continued to release propaganda as well as initiate attacks in northern Nigeria and southeastern Niger. Soon after the conclusion of Operation Yancin Tafki, the MJTF launched another counter-insurgency operation codenamed "Boma's Wrath". ISWAP also launched a southward offensive with several brigades, attacking Garkida in northern Adamawa State and Damboa in southern Borno. In March, the Nigerian and Nigerien militaries claimed to have killed Boko Haram commander Bakura Doro, a statement which was subsequently revealed to be false.

In contrast, attempts by the Nigerian Armed Forces to capture the Timbuktu Triangle (Note: A border area between Nigeria's Borno and Yobe states is known as the "Timbuktu Triangle". The area is covered by the Alagarno forest. The Timbuktu Triangle should not be confused with the city of Timbuktu in Mali.) from ISWAP in March 2020 resulted in heavy losses. ISWAP continued to maintain several strongholds in Nigeria.
