= 2016 Bodo bombings =

Boko Haram attacks in Far North Region, Cameroon

- Part of the Boko Haram insurgency
- Location: 12°21′35.66″N 14°28′19.08″E; Bodo, Far North Region, Cameroon
- Date: 25 January 2016; 10:00 a.m. WAT (UTC+01:00)
- Attack type: Islamic terrorism, suicide bombing, mass murder
- Deaths: 25-35 civilians
- Injuries: 65-86 civilians
- Perpetrator: (Islamic State) Boko Haram
- No. of participants: 4 female teenager attackers, allegedly

The 2016 Bodo bombings occurred on 25 January 2016, when four attackers suspected to be affiliated with the jihadist rebel group, Boko Haram, executed a quadruple suicide bombing. The attack occurred in Bodo, Far North Region, Cameroon. It killed upwards of 25-35 people and injured upwards of 65-86 others. Two female teenagers allegedly set off explosives hidden in sacks of grain in the village's market and two other female teenagers struck the town's entry and exit points. The attack was one of the deadliest in the Far North Region since 2013.

== Background ==
Jihadist group Boko Haram began an insurgency in Nigeria in 2009. In the mid-2010s, it intensified and spread to neighboring countries Cameroon, Chad and Niger. Although there was no immediate claim for the attack and has been none since, Boko Haram are suspected of being the perpetrators. The group has carried out many attacks in the Far North Region, including a double suicide bombing at the entrance to Bodo on 28 December 2015, which killed only the two attackers.

The Multinational Joint Task Force (MNJTF), which included Cameroon, Chad, Niger, Benin, and Nigeria at the time, reportedly had 8,700 regional troops around January 2016. However, continued delays stopped any joint operations from occurring prior to the day of the attack. Niger has since withdrawn from the MNJTF, announcing their withdrawal 30 March 2025. Strained relations between Nigeria and Niger and passive participation of Chadian forces in the MNJTF has slowed operations.

Boko Haram had been using remote locations in northern Cameroon as a rear base where they could acquire weapons, vehicle, and supplies. Bodo's adjacent El-Beid Ebeji River borders northeastern Nigeria, where a Boko Haram stronghold was located. The Cameroon-Nigeria border around the Far North Region had been subject to numerous operations executed by both the Cameroon Armed Forces (FAC) and the Nigerian Armed Forces (NAF) attempting to weaken Boko Haram.

Operations continue in nearby Cameroon and Nigeria, particularly through the Nigerian Army's Operation Hadin Kai (OPHK), which has been primarily deployed in Borno State, Nigeria. Notably, OPHK killed one of Boko Haram's top commander, Abu Fatima, on 30 May 2025.

== Bombing ==
Local sources claimed that high Harmattan winds, which had been blowing for approximately three days, including the day of the attack, inhibited vigilance committees from seeing the attackers enter the market in the middle of the night on 24 January.

The first bomb detonated on the town's primary entry road. The next two, one in the market's interior and another at its entrance, were detonated around 2 minutes later. The fourth and last was detonated at the town's primary exit road shortly after. Witnesses and local stations heard and reported the explosions at approximately 10 a.m.. Multiple sources initially reported hearing three explosions, indicating that the bombs in the market's interior to have detonated simultaneously.

== Reaction ==
Cameroon's Minister of Communications, Issa Tchiroma Bakary, reported on the night of 25 January that FAC had carried out multiple raids between towns in Nigeria bodering Bodo and the Cameroonian town of Achigashia. He claimed that the FAC killed 17 insurgents and concluded that the bombers were escorted by Boko Haram fighters.

The Governor of Cameroon's Far North Region, Midjiyawa Bakari, announced that markets along the Cameroon-Nigeria border, in proximity to Boko Haram's operating zone, would be temporarily closed. According to Cameroonian businessman Arouna Raphaël Njoya, the local economies of Bodo and nearby villages alike came to a standstill in fear following the attack and in compliance with Bakari's request.
