= 2021 Sagme attack =

2021 battle between Cameroon and Boko Haram

- Part of Boko Haram insurgency
Date	July 24, 2021
Location	Sagme, Far North Region, Cameroon
Result	Cameroonian victory

Belligerents
Cameroon	ISWAP

Strength
Unknown	90 men 6 pick-ups Several motorcycles

Casualties and losses
8 killed 13 injured	13–20 killed

On July 24, 2021, jihadists from Islamic State – West Africa Province (ISWAP) attacked a Cameroonian outpost in Sagme, Cameroon, sparking a battle that killed eight Cameroonian soldiers and twenty jihadists.

== Background ==
In 2016, Boko Haram founder and commander Abubakar Shekau pledged allegiance to the Islamic State and renamed the group Islamic State – West Africa Province (ISWAP), although the central Islamic State command installed Abu Musab al-Barnawi as the leader of ISWAP. This started a schism that culminated in the Battle of Sambisa Forest in May 2021, where Shekau killed himself and ISWAP effectively became the dominant jihadist group in the Lake Chad region, which includes northern Cameroon.

Boko Haram fighters attacked the town of Sagme in northern Cameroon in 2018, killing six soldiers and 15 jihadists. Throughout 2021, ISWAP attempted to establish more influence in northern Cameroon, with several attacks on Cameroonian military posts that summer.

== Attack ==
According to Cameroonian authorities, around 90 jihadists on six vehicles and several motorcycles entered Sagme from the Nigerian border. The jihadists, all of whom were well-armed and some in military uniforms, attacked the Cameroonian outpost in Sagme around 4:00 a.m. An anonymous Cameroonian soldier who survived the attack said that the post's commander and six other soldiers had died fighting bravely.

The attack killed eight soldiers, and Cameroonian authorities assessed that twenty jihadists were killed. Six of the Cameroonian soldiers were killed during the battle, and two died en route to a hospital in Maroua. Cameroonian officials added that the ISWAP fighters fled carrying the bodies of their comrades, so the fatalities among the jihadists were difficult to determine. The United States later assessed that 13 jihadists were killed, citing several accounts. Thirteen soldiers were wounded as well.

Several hundred civilians fled Sagme during and following the attack. The governor of Far North Region, where Sagme is located, urged the civilians to return to their homes and reiterated a prior statement from President Paul Biya that reinforcements would arrive in the town. The attack in Sagme was the deadliest day for the Cameroonian army in over ten months.

== Aftermath ==
ISWAP attacked Far North Region again on July 26, killing five soldiers and a civilian during an attack at Zigue. Around 17 jihadists were killed in the attack as well.
