= Battles of Toumbun Allura Kurnawa and Toumbun Gini =

2022–23 Boko Haram-ISWAP battles in Lake Chad

Battles of Toumbun Allura Karnawa and Toumbun Gini
- Part of the Boko Haram insurgency and the Boko Haram–ISWAP conflict
| Date | 30 December 2022 – 7 January 2023 |
| Location | Toumbun Allura Karnawa and Toumbun Gini, Abadam, Borno State, Nigeria |
| Result | Boko Haram victory |
| Territorial changes | Boko Haram captures several ISWAP bases in Lake Chad, ISWAP commanders flee to other areas of Borno State |

Belligerents
| Boko Haram | Islamic State: West Africa Province (ISWAP) |

Commanders and leaders
| Bakura Doro | Abu Musab al-Barnawi |

Casualties and losses
| Unknown | 100+ killed, 35+ injured |

Between 30 December 2022 and 7 January 2023, Boko Haram launched a series of raids against Islamic State – West Africa Province on various islands on Lake Chad, with major battles occurring on Toumbun Allura Karnawa and Toumbun Gini.

== Prelude ==
Boko Haram rose to prominence in northeastern Nigeria in the early 2010's, growing to control territory in Borno State, southern Niger, and northern Cameroon. In 2021, the Islamic State - West Africa Province, which formed from ex-Boko Haram groups, launched an offensive that saw the death of Boko Haram's leader Abubakar Shekau and ISWAP dominating former Boko Haram strongholds. Since then, ISWAP has been engaged in conflict with various Boko Haram remnant groups, along with the Nigerian army.

== Conflict ==
The first attacks by Boko Haram against ISWAP occurred on 30 December at the villages of Toumbun Allura Kurnawa and Kangar, in Abadam. The Boko Haram fighters were led by Bakura Doro. The battles at Allura Kurnawa and Kangar lasted for 13 hours and left 30 militants on both sides dead. The Boko Haram fighters led by Doro later fled to a hideout on the border of Niger. The ISWAP fighters were forced to flee from the area. Four hostages captured by ISWAP on 3 August 2022 were freed during the attack.

The next major attack occurred on January 7, in the villages of Toumbun Gini, seizing large amounts of ISWAP weaponry and then killing ISWAP militants fleeing westward. At least 100 ISWAP fighters were killed in the battle, and 35 were injured. The leader of ISWAP, Abu Musab al-Barnawi, was forced to flee during the Boko Haram offensive. Ten ISWAP fighters surrendered to Nigerien forces after the battle at Toumbun Gini to avoid Boko Haram attacks.

== Aftermath ==
Al-Barnawi returned to the Lake Chad area with 300 fighters on 10 January, announcing reprisal attacks against Boko Haram for the raids. This was followed by attacks in February and March 2023 that killed hundreds of Boko Haram fighters.
