= Battle of Kaïga =

- Part of Boko Haram insurgency
| Date | May 5, 2017 |
| Location | Kaïga, Lake Chad, Chad |
| Result | Chadian victory |

Belligerents
| Chad | ISWAP |

Casualties and losses
| 9 killed 20 wounded | 38 killed |

On May 5, 2017, ISWAP militants attacked the village of Kaïga on Lake Chad, killing several Chadian soldiers but ultimately being repelled.

== Background ==
Boko Haram, known after March 7, 2015 as the Islamic State's West Africa Province (ISWAP), first attacked Chadian territory in March 2015 at the battle of Ngouboua, killing several Chadian soldiers and several dozen civilians. They attacked Chadian territory several more times in 2015, but barely in 2016. ISWAP attacked the village of Djoroye near Kaïga between September 24 and 25, 2016, killing seven Chadian soldiers.

== Battle ==
On the early morning of May 5, 2017, ISWAP fighters attacked Kaïga on the island of Kindjiri near the border with Niger. Fierce fighting began between the jihadists and Chadian troops, but the Chadians got the upper hand and ultimately repulsed the attack. The battle was some of the worst fighting the area had seen in several months. A few hours after the attack, anonymous sources told AFP that nine Chadian soldiers had been killed and around 20 wounded, compared to 40 jihadists killed. The Chadian government released a statement the next day citing the same toll, except with 38 jihadists dead and not 40.
