= Rann, Borno State =

Rann
- Town
- Location in Nigeria
- Coordinates: 12.2701°N 14.4636°E
- Country: Nigeria
- State: Borno
- LGA: Kala/Balge

Population (2017)
  - Total: 43,000+

Rann is a town in Borno State, Nigeria, adjacent to the border with Cameroon. It is the headquarters of Kala/Balge LGA and was home to a camp for internally displaced people.

== History ==
Rann is one of the localities in north-eastern Nigeria that have become accessible to humanitarian organizations. Emergency assistance is gradually being increased in areas that were previously unreachable. In Rann, around 43,000 people are internally displaced and also struggle with serious food shortages with severe acute malnutrition. Humanitarian access to the area has been difficult due to insecurity and bad roads, as stated by United Nations Office for the Coordination of Humanitarian Affairs in its press release. On 17 January 2017, the Nigerian Air Force mistakenly bombed the camp, leaving at least 52 people dead and over 100 injured.

On 14 January 2019, Rann was overrun by Boko Haram insurgents amid a general increase of insurgent attacks in the area, and destroyed, with many inhabitants fleeing across the border to Bodo in Cameroon. At the time, the town had been home to 35,000 refugees. Though the attack was initially attributed to Abu Musab al-Barnawi's ISWAP, Abubakar Shekau's Boko Haram later claimed responsibility. Though the Nigerian military and allied Cameroonian Armed Forces forces subsequently retook Rann, they later abandoned it, so Boko Haram launched another raid against the town on 28 January 2019. The militants again set the settlement ablaze, murdered local elders, and caused tens of thousands to flee. This time, the refugees from Rann relocated to Goura in Cameroon's Far North Region.

In August 2021, Rann was overrun by ISWAP insurgents who destroyed the local barracks and looted the settlement before retreating back into the bush.
