= Goura, Far North Region =

Goura
- Village
- Location in Cameroon
- Coordinates: 12.3327°N 14.5264°E
- Country: Cameroon
- Province: Far North Region
- Department: Logone-et-Chari
- Commune: Makary

Goura is a village in the Far North Region of Cameroon. It lies in a "dusty grey sun-bleached plain".

== History ==
After their home town of Rann in Nigeria was destroyed by Boko Haram in January 2019, about 35,000 people fled across the border into Cameroon. Most of these refugees relocated to Goura, where they constructed a "makeshift settlement".

== See also ==
- List of municipalities of Cameroon
- Communes of Cameroon
