= Mohammed Yusuf (Boko Haram) =

Islamist terrorist leader (1970–2009)

- Born: 29 January 1970; Jakusko, North-Eastern State, Nigeria (today Yobe)
- Died: 30 July 2009 (aged 39); Maiduguri, Borno, Nigeria
- Cause of death: Summary execution
- Military career
- Allegiance: Boko Haram
- Service years: 2002–2007
- Rank: Leader
- Conflicts: Boko Haram insurgency: 2009 Boko Haram uprising (executed)

Mohammed Yusuf (29 January 1970 – 30 July 2009), also known by his nom de guerre Abu Yusuf al-Barnawi, was a Nigerian militant who founded the Islamist militant group Boko Haram in 2002. He was its leader until he was killed during the 2009 Boko Haram uprising.

Born in Girgi village, in Jakusko, present-day Yobe State, Nigeria, Yusuf received a university education. Later he studied more of Islam and became a Salafi.

== Education and beliefs ==
According to scholar Paul Lubeck, as a young man Yusuf was instructed in Shia Islam. He had the equivalent of a graduate education, according to Nigerian academic Hussain Zakaria. Yusuf was not as proficient in English as was reported. He believed in the strict application of Islamic law, Boko Haram hitmen would murder members of other Muslim sects like the Salafist Izala and the Sufi Tidjaniyya and Qadiriya fraternities. In a 2009 BBC interview, Yusuf stated his belief that the concept of a spherical Earth is contrary to Islamic teaching and should be rejected. He also rejected Darwinian evolution, and the concept of the condensation cycle that produces rain. In the interview he said:

There are prominent Islamic preachers who have seen and understood that the present Western-style education is mixed with issues that run contrary to our beliefs in Islam, he said.

Like rain. We believe it is a creation of God rather than an evaporation caused by the sun that condenses and becomes rain.

Like saying the world is a sphere. If it runs contrary to the teachings of Allah, we reject it. We also reject the theory of Darwinism.

== Personal life ==
Yusuf had four wives and 11 children, one of them being Abu Musab al-Barnawi, who claimed since 2016 to be the rightful leader of Boko Haram, opposing Abubakar Shekau.

He was reported as living a lavish lifestyle, supposedly owning a Mercedes-Benz.

== Death ==
Following the July 2009 Boko Haram uprising, the Nigerian military captured Yusuf. They transferred him to the custody of the Nigerian police force. The police summarily executed Yusuf in public view outside the police headquarters in Maiduguri. Police officials initially claimed either that Yusuf was shot while trying to escape or died of wounds he sustained during a gun battle with the military.
