= Birnin Gwari =

- City and LGA
- Interactive map of Birnin Gwari
- Location in Nigeria
- Coordinates: 10°40′0″N 6°33′0″E
- Country: Nigeria
- State: Kaduna State

Government
  - chairman: Hon Salisu Isah Karama (Elected by the people of Birnin Gwari, revered and respected by them)

Area
  - Total: 6,185 km^{2} (2,388 sq mi)

Population (2006)
  - Total: 252,363
  - Density: 40.80/km^{2} (105.7/sq mi)
- Time zone: UTC+1 (WAT)
- Postal code: 800

Birnin Gwari is a city, emirate and Local Government Area in Kaduna State, Nigeria.

It has an area of 6,185 km^{2} and a population of 252,363 at the 2006 census.

The postal code of the area is 800.

== Economy ==
Sorghum, maize, and soybeans are just a few of the many crops that are commonly grown in Birnin Gwari LGA. Minerals like gold, quartzite, and silmanite are plentiful in Birnin Gwari. Birnin Gwari local government region, which includes markets like the well-known Royan market, is also a favorable location for the trade of a variety of commodities.

== Climate/Geography ==
With 2,406 millimetres (94.73 inches) of precipitation and 135.09 days with rain, Birnin Gwari, a district in Nigeria, has an average yearly temperature of 29.13 °C, which is -0.33% below the national average.

The hot season lasts for 2.1 months, from February 17 to April 21, with an average daily high temperature of over 94 °F. The hottest month of the year in Birnin Gwari is April, with an average high temperature of 95 °F and low temperature of 73 °F.

The 3.5-month cool season, which runs from June 22 to October 6, has an average daily high temperature of less than 85 °F. With an average low temperature of 58 °F and a high temperature of 87 °F, December is the coldest month of the year in Birnin Gwari.

The average proportion of sky covered by clouds in Birnin Gwari varies significantly seasonally throughout the year.

Beginning about November 3 and lasting for four months, the clearer season in Birnin Gwari ends around March 2.

In Birnin Gwari, January is the clearest month of the year, with the sky remaining clear, mostly clear, or partly overcast 61% of the time.

The year's cloudier eight-month period, which starts around March 2 and ends around November 3, lasts from then till then.

In Birnin Gwari, May is the month with the greatest clouds, with the sky being cloudy or mostly cloudy 81% of the time on average during this month.

The Birnin Gwari LGA covers a total area of 6,185 square kilometres or 2,388 square miles, and its relative humidity is 28 percent. Birnin Gwari's average temperature is 31 degrees Celsius or 88 degrees Fahrenheit, and the average wind speed is 10 km/h. The rainy season and the dry season are the two main seasons in Birnin Gwari LGA.

== Administrative Subdivision ==
There are about 11 wards in Birnin Gwari Local government area as follows.

1. Dogon Dawa Ward.
2. Gayam Ward.
3. Kakangi Ward.
4. Kazage Ward.
5. Kutemesi Ward.
6. Kuyelo Ward.
7. Magajin Gari I Ward.
8. Magajin Gari II Ward.
9. Magajin Gari III Ward
10. Randagi Ward.
11. Tabanni Ward.
