= 2009 Boko Haram uprising =

Part of the Boko Haram insurgency in Nigeria

- Part of the Boko Haram insurgency
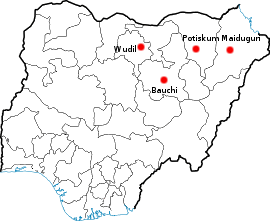
| Date | 26–29 July 2009 |
| Location | Nigeria: Bauchi, Bauchi State; Maiduguri, Borno State; Potiskum, Yobe State; Wudil, Kano State; 10.317°N 9.85°E |
| Result | Violence quelled |

Belligerents
| Boko Haram | Nigerian Government |

Commanders and leaders
| Mohammed Yusuf (executed); Abubakar Shekau; Bakura Doro | Umaru Yar'Adua; Ibrahim Geidam; Ali Modu Sheriff; Isa Yuguda; Saleh Maina; Christopher Dega |

Casualties and losses
- Around 1,000 dead total, mostly civilians
- The battles began in Bauchi and quickly spread to Maiduguri, Potiskum and Wudil.

The 2009 Boko Haram uprising was a four-day armed conflict that took place from 26 to 29 July 2009 between the Islamist militant group Boko Haram and Nigerian security forces across several states in northeastern Nigeria. Fighting broke out in Bauchi before spreading to Maiduguri, Potiskum, and Wudil. Around 1,000 people were killed in total, with approximately 700 deaths recorded in Maiduguri alone. The uprising marked the first major armed confrontation between Boko Haram and the Nigerian state and is widely regarded as a pivotal moment in the development of the broader Boko Haram insurgency.

The immediate trigger for the violence was a confrontation between Boko Haram members and security forces at a checkpoint in Maiduguri, though tensions between the group and Nigerian authorities had been building for years, and warnings from local Muslim leaders and military officials had reportedly been ignored. The violence began with a Boko Haram attack on a police station in Bauchi, though President Umaru Yar'Adua later disputed this account, claiming that government forces had acted first on the basis of intelligence about a planned attack. On 30 July, Boko Haram founder and leader Mohammed Yusuf was captured by the military and handed to police, who summarily executed him in public outside police headquarters in Maiduguri. His father-in-law and other suspects were also executed by police. The killings were captured on video and later drew international condemnation.

The uprising and the extrajudicial killing of Yusuf are considered defining events in the radicalisation of Boko Haram, transforming it from a localised Salafi sect into a violent jihadist insurgency. Abubakar Shekau, who was initially reported killed during the fighting, survived and subsequently rose to lead the organisation through a prolonged campaign of terrorism across Nigeria and neighbouring countries.

== Background ==
A government inquiry later found that, while long-standing tensions existed between Boko Haram and the Nigerian Security forces, the immediate cause of the violence stemmed from a confrontation between a group of sect members and joint Task Forces located at custom bridge Gamboru ward in the city of Maiduguri. The Boko Haram members were en route to bury one of their members at the Gwange cemetery. The officers, part of a special operation to suppress violence and rampant crime in Borno State, demanded that the young men comply with a law requiring motorcycle passengers to wear helmets. They refused, and in the confrontation that followed, police shot and wounded several of the men.

== Attacks and response ==
According to initial media reports, the violence began on 26 July when Boko Haram launched an attack on a police station in Bauchi State. Clashes between militants and the Nigeria Police Force erupted in the states of Kano, Yobe and Borno soon after. But President Umaru Yar’Adua disputed this version of events, claiming that government security forces had struck first:

"I want to emphasize that this is not an inter-religious crisis and it is not the Taliban group that attacked the security agents first, no. It was as a result of a security information gathered on their intention ... to launch a major attack," he said.

=== Bauchi ===
On 26 July more than 50 people were killed and several dozen were injured in Bauchi when a firefight erupted as a police station was attacked by 70 Boko Haram members, who were armed with grenades and small arms. One government soldier and 32 Boko Haram militants were killed in the aftermath of the initial attack. The government claimed that 39 militants had been killed and confirmed the death of a soldier. Security forces retaliated by raiding the neighbourhoods where the group was entrenched.

Isa Yuguda, State Governor of Bauchi, commented: "We have pre-empted the militants. Otherwise the situation would have been bad. I'm calling on all the people of Bauchi to be calm and be rest assured the situation has been brought under control." Yuguda declared a night-time curfew, and police maintained a visible profile. Businesses remained open in the area.

=== Maiduguri ===
On 28 July army soldiers reportedly launched an offensive on the compound of sect leader Mohammed Yusuf and a nearby mosque used by his followers in Maiduguri. Troops shelled Yusuf's home in the city after Yusuf's followers barricaded themselves inside. Shots rained across the city.

On 30 July, Nigerian security forces killed 100 Boko Haram militants in fighting in Maiduguri. Security forces fought their way into a mosque occupied by militants, raking the interior with machine gun fire. Elsewhere, military and police forces engaged militants in house-to-house fighting. It was initially reported that Boko Haram vice-chairman Abubakar Shekau had been killed, but he was later reported alive. Nigerian policemen were also killed. After the government declared Maidguri to be secured, Nigerian forces began setting up mortar positions to shell the remaining enemy compound.

On 30 July, Yusuf was captured by the military and handed over to the police at the police headquarters in Maiduguri. Police officers summarily executed Yusuf inside the compound in full view of public onlookers. Police officials initially claimed that either Yusuf was shot while trying to escape or died of wounds sustained during a gun battle with the military. The police also executed other Boko Haram suspects, including Yusuf's father-in-law, outside the police headquarters.

On 2 August, a group of women and children abducted by Boko Haram were found locked in a house in Maiduguri. The military said a total of 700 people were killed in Maiduguri during the clashes. The Red Cross later said that it had taken 780 bodies from the streets of the city to be buried in mass graves.

The media reported that 100 bodies were found beside police headquarters in Maiduguri. Hundreds of people were leaving their homes to escape the violence. A jailbreak was reported but was not immediately confirmed. Several civilian corpses lay in the city's streets; witnesses said they had been shot after being pulled from their cars. The army and police were both on patrol and firing at suspects.

=== Potiskum ===
A gun battle lasting several hours took place in Potiskum on 30 July. Boko Haram militants set a police station on fire using fuel-laden motorcycles. The police station burned to the ground, and a police officer and a fire safety officer were both killed. Police engaged the fighters and wounded several. Police arrested 23 fighters after the battle. According to Nigerian sources, 43 Boko Haram fighters were killed in the shootout.

=== Wudil ===
Three people were killed in an attack in Wudil, and police forces made more than 33 arrests. Wudil's senior police officer was injured.

== Aftermath ==
Islam Online suggests that politics, not religion, was the cause of the violence. However, people such as Christian pastor George Orjih were murdered specifically because they refused to convert to Islam.

Prior to the clashes, many local Muslim leaders and at least one military official had warned the Nigerian authorities about the Boko Haram sect. Those warnings were reportedly ignored.

Violence across several states in northeastern Nigeria resulted in more than 1,000 dead, with around 700 killed in Maiduguri alone, according to one military official.

== See also ==
- Bauchi prison break
