= 2015 Ngouboua attack =

- Part of Boko Haram insurgency
Date	February 13, 2015
Location	Ngouboua, Chad
Result	Chadian victory

Belligerents
Chad	Boko Haram

Casualties and losses
1 killed 4 injured	27 killed 5 injured
- 4+ civilians killed

On February 13, 2015, Boko Haram militants attacked the village of Ngouboua, on the shores of Lake Chad, sparking a skirmish between Chadian soldiers and the militants. The attack, though repulsed by the Chadian soldiers, was the first Boko Haram attack on Chadian territory.

== Background ==
Throughout Boko Haram's rampage in Nigeria's Borno State and northern Cameroon in 2014 and early 2015, Chad had managed to stay relatively insulated from any Boko Haram attacks on their soil. In January 2015, Chad deployed thousands of soldiers to northern Cameroon to aid the Cameroonian government in repelling Boko Haram attacks coming from the Nigerian border. Chadian troops were key in defending the Cameroonian city of Bodo from an attack on January 30, and recaptured the Nigerian city of Gamboru Ngala a few days later.

On February 6, Boko Haram militants attacked the town of Bosso in Niger, their first attack on Nigerien soil. The Bosso attack was disastrous for the group, with at least 400 militants being killed by a joint Nigerien-Chadian garrison.

== Attack ==
On the night between February 12 and 13, 2015, a small group of jihadists crossed Lake Chad in three boats. At about 3am, the jihadists reached the Ngouboua peninsula in Chadian territory, and began attacking the village of the same name. The militants split into two groups; one attacked the gendarmerie post in the village, and the other began setting fire to civilian houses and shops.

At least two-thirds of the houses were burnt and a lot of livestock were killed. The Chadian gendarmes managed to repel the jihadists, who eventually retreated across the river. The Chadian air force intervened, sinking the three boats used by the attackers. According to the Chadian army, one soldier was killed and four were injured. A resident of Ngouboua speaking to Vice News said that 27 people were killed in the boat strike. Some of those killed in the boat strike were civilians kidnapped by Boko Haram. Two jihadists were killed, and five were injured. Four civilians, including the village chief, were killed. The majority of Ngouboua's residents fled after the attack.
