= Islamic State – West Africa Province =

Administrative branch of militant group

- ولاية غرب إفريقية; Province of West Africa
- Logo of the Islamic State West Africa province
- Dates active: 2015 – 2016 (as unified group); 2016 – present (after split)
- Split from: Boko Haram
- Group: Islamic State in the Greater Sahara (March 2019 – 2022)
- Headquarters: Gudumbali (January 24–26, 2022)
- Active regions: See territory of the Islamic State – West Africa Province
- Ideology: See ideology of the Islamic State
- Size: c. 8,000 – 12,000 (2025)
- Part of: Islamic State
- Wars: Battles and wars: War in the Sahel; Boko Haram insurgency; 2015 West African offensive; Chad Basin campaign (2018–2020); Garin Giwa ambush; Battle of Geidam; 2021 Sagme attack; Kuje prison break; 2026 United States intervention in Nigeria; Boko Haram–ISWAP conflict; Battle of Sambisa Forest; Battles of Toumbun Allura Kurnawa and Toumbun Gini; Battle of Lake Chad; Nigerian bandit conflict; Islamist insurgency in Burkina Faso; Islamist insurgency in Niger; Diori Hamani International Airport attack; United States intervention in Niger; December 2017 Diffa Region clash

The Islamic State – West Africa Province (ISWAP), officially Wilāyat Ġarb Ifrīqīyā (Arabic: ولاية غرب إفريقية), meaning 'Province of West Africa', is a militant group and administrative division of the Islamic State (IS), a Salafi jihadist militant group and unrecognised quasi-state. ISWAP is primarily active in the Chad Basin, and fights an extensive insurgency against the states of Nigeria, Cameroon, Chad, and Niger. It is an offshoot of Boko Haram with which it has a violent rivalry. Until March 2022, ISWAP acted as an umbrella organization for all IS factions in West Africa including the Islamic State in the Greater Sahara (IS-GS), although the actual ties between ISWAP and IS-GS were limited.

== Name ==
The Islamic State's West Africa Province is officially called Wilāyat Garb Ifrīqīyā (Arabic: ولاية غرب أفريقيا), literally 'Province of West Africa'. It is known by a variety of other names and abbreviations such as ISWAP, IS-WA, and ISIS-WA. After ISWAP formally absorbed the Islamic State in the Greater Sahara (IS-GS), it was also differentiated by experts into two branches, namely ISWAP-Lake Chad and ISWAP-Greater Sahara.

== History ==
ISWAP's origins date back to the emergence of Boko Haram, a Salafi jihadist movement centred in Borno State in northeastern Nigeria. The movement launched an insurgency against the Nigerian government following an unsuccessful uprising in 2009, aiming at establishing an Islamic state in northern Nigeria, and the neighbouring regions of Cameroon, Chad and Niger. Its de facto leader Abubakar Shekau attempted to increase his international standing among Islamists by allying with the prominent Islamic State (IS) in March 2015. Boko Haram thus became the Islamic State's West Africa Province (ISWAP).

When the insurgents were subsequently defeated and lost almost all of their lands during the 2015 West African offensive by the Multinational Joint Task Force (MJTF), discontent grew among the rebels. Despite orders by the ISIL's central command to stop using women and children as suicide bombers as well as refrain from mass killings of civilians, Shekau refused to change his tactics. Researcher Aymenn Jawad Al-Tamimi summarized that the Boko Haram leader proved to be "too extreme even by the Islamic State's standards". Shekau had always refused to fully submit to ISIL's central command, and the latter consequently removed him as leader of ISWAP in August 2016. Shekau responded by breaking with ISIL's central command, but many of the rebels stayed loyal to IS. As a result, the rebel movement split into a Shekau-loyal faction ("Jama'at Ahl al-sunna li-l-Da'wa wa-l-Jihad", generally known as "Boko Haram"), and a pro-IS faction led by Abu Musab al-Barnawi (which continued to call itself "Islamic State's West Africa Province"). These two groups have since clashed with each other, though they possibly occasionally cooperated against the local governments. In addition, Shekau never officially renounced his pledge of allegiance to IS as a whole; his forces are thus occasionally regarded as "second branch of ISWAP". Overall, the relation of Shekau with IS remained confused and ambiguous.

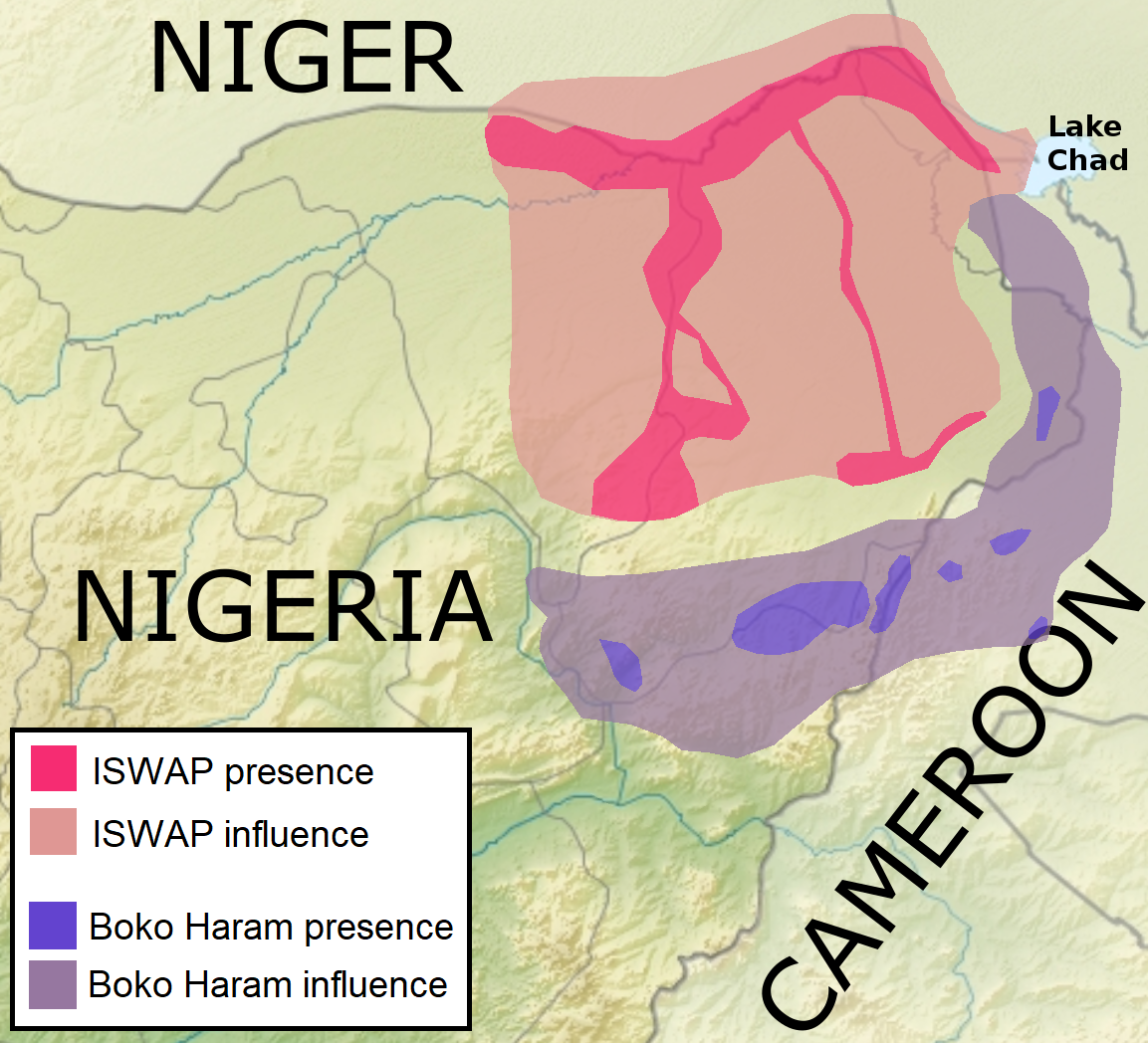
Presence and influence of ISWAP and Boko Haram in northern Nigeria, Cameroon, and Niger in early 2019

In the next years, Barnawi's ISWAP and Shekau's Boko Haram both reconsolidated, though ISWAP grew into the more powerful group. Whereas Shekau had about 1,000 to 2,000 fighters under his command by 2019, the Islamic State loyalists counted up to 5,000 troops. It also changed its tactics, and attempted to win support by local civilians unlike Boko Haram which was known for its extensive indiscriminate violence. ISWAP begun to build up basic government services and focused its efforts on attacking Christian targets instead of Muslim ones. However, the group also continued to attack humanitarian personnel and select Muslim communities. In the course of the Chad Basin campaign (2018–2020), ISWAP had extensive territorial gains before losing many to counter-offensives by the local security forces. At the same time, it experienced a violent internal dispute which resulted in the deposition of Abu Musab al-Barnawi and the execution of several commanders. In the course of 2020, the Nigerian Armed Forces repeatedly attempted to capture the Timbuktu Triangle (Note: A border area between Nigeria's Borno and Yobe states is known as the "Timbuktu Triangle". The area is covered by the Alagarno forest. The Timbuktu Triangle should not be confused with the city of Timbuktu in Mali.) from ISWAP, but suffered heavy losses and made no progress.

In April 2021, ISWAP overran a Nigerian Army base around Mainok, capturing armoured fighting vehicles including main battle tanks, as well as other military equipment. In the next month, ISWAP attacked and overran Boko Haram's bases in the Sambisa Forest and Abubakar Shekau killed himself. As a result, many Boko Haram fighters defected to ISWAP, and the group secured a chain of strongholds from Nigeria to Mali to southern Libya. Despite this major victory, ISWAP was forced to deal with Boko Haram loyalists who continued to oppose the Islamic State. In August 2021, Abu Musab al-Barnawi was reportedly killed, either in battle with the Nigerian Army or during inter-ISWAP clashes. The accuracy of this claim was questioned by Humangle Media researchers who gathered "multiple sources" suggesting that al-Barnawi had disappeared due to being promoted. Later that month, ISWAP suffered a defeat when attacking Diffa, but successfully raided Rann, destroying the local barracks before retreating with loot. In October and November, there were further leadership changes in ISWAP, as senior commanders were killed by security forces, with Sani Shuwaram becoming the new leading commander.

By January 2022, ISWAP began to increase its presence in Nigeria's Borno State, occupying villages and setting up markets. On 24 January 2022, the small town of Gudumbali was captured, whereupon the insurgents declared it the province's new capital and drove away the local chieftains. Gudumbali is of strategic as well as symbolic importance, as it is placed at a well defendable position and was a major Boko Haram stronghold during the latter group's peak in power. However, Nigerian troops immediately counter-attacked this time, retaking the settlement, destroying the local ISWAP headquarters, and a nearby night market associated with the group. By this point, researchers Rueben Dass and Jasminder Singh argued that ISWAP had become one of IS' most important strongholds. In March, IS central command recognized its Greater Sahara branch as an autonomous province, called the "Sahel Province". Regardless, ISWAP maintained influence over IS forces in Mali, Burkina Faso, and Niger.

In the following months, however, Nigeria continued its attacks on ISWAP's leadership, killing more top commanders. In June 2022, the Nigerian National Security Council declared that ISWAP was probably responsible for the Owo church attack. As of October 2022, ISWAP had absorbed most of the former Boko Haram groups; even one of Shekau's biological sons, known as Abul Musanna, had joined ISWAP as a commander. However, some Boko Haram factions continued their resistance, joined by Boko Haram defectors to ISWAP who had rebelled and rejoined their comrades. These splinter groups generally avoided fighting ISWAP directly, forcing the IS militants to expend considerable efforts to prevent defections and hunt for Boko Haram loyalists. Despite these difficulties, ISWAP had also expanded its operations into central, northwestern, and southwestern Nigeria. In the west, it began to compete with a reemerged Ansaru, however it sometimes collaborates with Ansaru. ISWAP organizes anti-government ambushes, terrorist attacks, and assassinations. In December, the group pledged allegiance to the new IS caliph, Abu al-Hussein al-Husseini al-Qurashi. Meanwhile, the Battles of Toumbun Allura Kurnawa and Toumbun Gini erupted between ISWAP and Boko Haram. By January 2023, these clashes had ended in a substantial Boko Haram victory and the loss of several ISWAP bases at Lake Chad, though heavy fighting continued during the next months.

From March to June 2023, ISWAP greatly increased the number of small-scale raids in Cameroon's Far North Region, targeting Gassama, Amchide, Fotokol, and Mora among other locations. According to researcher Jacob Zenn, these attacks appeared to be mostly operations to gather loot and supplies as well as spread terror among civilians who refused to pay taxes to IS. The repeated raids caused "severe economic disruption" in northern Cameroon.

On 29 January 2026, the Islamic State's Sahel Province and West Africa Province launched a large scale attack on Diori Hamani International Airport in Niamey, Niger. The attack resulted in the deaths of twenty IS fighters and the capture of eleven others.

== Organization ==
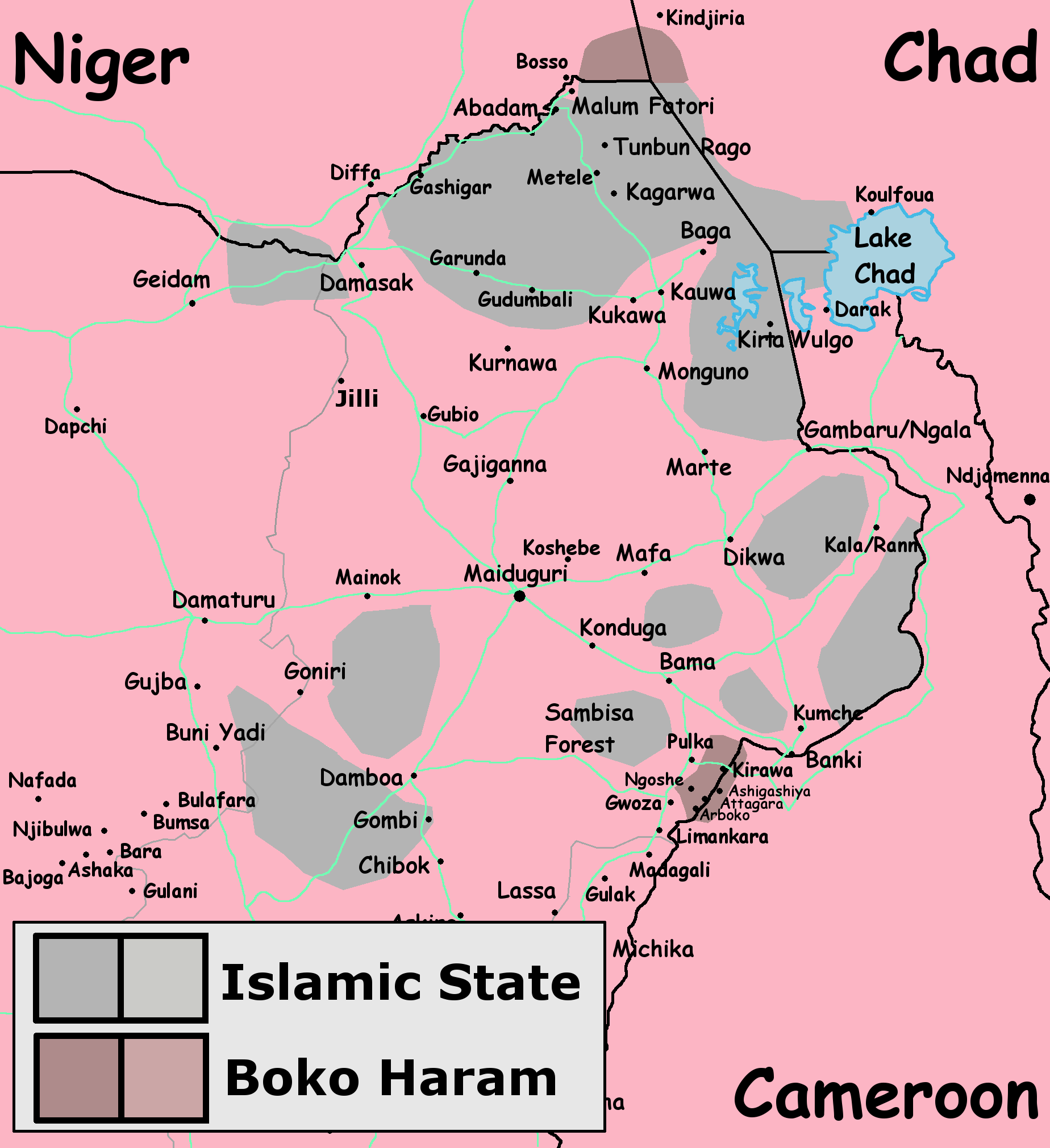
Areas under control of Boko Haram and ISWAP in 2022

ISWAP's leadership is subordinate to IS's core group headed by its caliph. Initially, ISWAP was headed by a single commander, termed the wali (governor). The group's first overall wali was Abubakar Shekau who was succeeded by Abu Musab al-Barnawi in 2016. The latter was replaced by Ba Idrisa in March 2019 who was in turn purged and executed in 2020. He was replaced by Ba Lawan. In general, the shura, a consultative assembly, holds great power within the group. This has led researcher Jacob Zenn to argue that the shura gives the group an element of "democracy". The shura's influence has allowed ISWAP to expand its popular support, yet has also made it more prone to leadership struggles. Appointments to leadership positions such as the shura or the governorships are discussed internally and by ISIL's core group; IS's core group also has to approve new appointments. In general, journalist Murtala Abdullahi argued that ISWAP mirrors the tendence of the IS core group to release little information on its leaders to the public, making even top commanders like Abu Musab al-Barnawi "elusive" figures.

In May 2021, the shura was temporarily dissolved and Abu Musab al-Barnawi was appointed "caretaker" leader of ISWAP. By July 2021, the shura had been restored, and ISWAP's internal system had been reformed. The regional central command now consists of the Amirul Jaish (military leader) and the shura. There is no longer an overall wali, and the shura's head instead serves as leader of ISWAP's governorates, while the Amirul Jaish acts as chief military commander. "Sa'ad" served as new Amirul Jaish, while Abu Musab al-Barnawi became head of the shura. However, non-IS sources still claim that a position referred to as the overall "wali" or "leader of ISWAP" continues to exist. This position was reportedly filled by ex-chief wali Ba Lawan (also "Abba Gana") before passing to Abu-Dawud (also "Aba Ibrahim"), Abu Musab al-Barnawi, Malam Bako, Sani Shuwaram, Bako Gorgore, and Abu Ibrahim in quick succession in late 2021 and early 2022. In course of 2022, ISWAP continued its reorganization efforts. The group's sub-units (or governorates) were granted a considerable level of autonomy, allowing them to operate as they saw fit and to separately pledge allegiance to the new IS caliph, Abu al-Hussein al-Husseini al-Qurashi.

In March 2019, IS's core group began to portray ISWAP as being responsible for all operations by pro-IS groups in West Africa. Accordingly, the Islamic State in the Greater Sahara (IS-GS) was formally put under ISWAP's command. ISWAP and IS-GS maintain logistical connections, but the former's actual influence on the latter is limited. IS-GS was later separated from ISWAP, becoming its own province. Regardless, ISWAP and IS-GS continued to cooperate through the al-Furqan Office in the General Directorate of Provinces. The al-Furqan Office is located in IS-GS territory, it was headed by Abu-Bilal al-Minuki until he was killed by a joint US-Nigeria operation in 2026.

In general, ISWAP is known to maintain substantial contacts with IS's core group, although the exact extent of ties is debated among researchers. ISWAP aligns ideologically with IS, and has also adopted many of its technologies and tactics. ISWAP uses suicide vehicle-borne improvised explosive devices and drones typical for IS. Researchers consider these as proof of support and advice by IS members from Syria and Iraq. IS's core group has probably provided ISWAP with not just technical, but also financial aid.

=== Known offices and leadership ===
| Office | Office-holders |
|---|---|
| Wali of ISWAP | Abubakar Shekau (2015–2016) – deposed for being too radical; Abu Musab al-Barnawi (2016–2019) – deposed and demoted without explanation; Abu Abdullahi Umar Al Barnawi "Ba Idrisa" (2019–2020) – purged and reportedly killed after some of his followers opposed his deposition; Lawan Abubakar "Ba Lawan" / "Abba Gana" (2020–2021); Note: The office of overall wali appeared to have been abolished by 2021, but outside sources continue to claim that certain individuals are the "leader" or "wali" of ISWAP. Post-2021 leaders: Lawan Abubakar "Ba Lawan" / "Abba Gana" (July–August 2021); "Abu Dawud" / "Aba Ibrahim" (from August 2021); Abu Musab al-Barnawi; Malam Bako (c. October 2021); Sani Shuwaram (November 2021–February 2022); Bako Gorgore and Abu Ibrahim (as co-commanders; February–May 2022) |
| Amirul Jaish | Abdul-Kaka "Sa'ad" (c. 2021) – also administered the Lake Chad area by May 2021; moved to the Shura Council in August 2021; Sayinna Mallam Baba (killed in late 2021); Malam Bako (acting, from September 2021) – also served as ISWAP defense minister; allegedly killed in October 2021 |
| Head of the Shura | Abu Musab al-Barnawi (2021) – also acted as commander of Sambisa Forest from May 2021; either killed in August 2021 or promoted to another position; Malam Bako (August–October 2021); allegedly killed in October 2021 |
| Deputy (Naib) | Malam Bako (from July–August 2021) |
| Chief Judge | Khalifa Umar (c. 2020) – killed in a MJTF airstrike in January 2020; at the time, he had been the third-highest ranking commander in ISWAP; Muhammad Malumma (since 2020) |
| Chief Prosecutor | Ibn Umar (from July 2021) |
| Wali of Tumbuma | Lawan Abubakar "Ba Lawan" / "Abba Gana" (c. 2021); Abba-Kaka (from July 2021) |
| Wali of Timbuktu | Bako Gorgore (until 2021) – killed in the battle of Sambisa Forest (May 2021) |
| Wali of Sambisa Forest | Vacant as of mid-2021 |
| Wali of Lake Chad | Baba Kaka (?–2020) – initially a commander in the Timbuktu area; eventually executed on charges of corruption, misgovernment, insubordination, and others after Ba Lawan's rise to ISWAP leader; Goni Maina (c. 2020); Vacant as of mid-2021 |
| Ameer Fiya of Timbuktu | Huozaifah Ibn Sadiq (from September 2021) |
| Ameer Fiya of Sambisa Forest | Abou Abdulrahman (killed c. September 2021); Abou Aseyia (from September 2021) |
| Amir of Marte | Muhammed Mustapha (from c. August 2021) |
| Fitya of Marte | Huozaifah Ibn Sadiq (until September 2021) |
| Minister of Finance | Abu Bakr ibn Muhammad ibn Ali al-Mainuki "Abubakar Mainok" (by 2020) |
| Chief Mechanic | Falloja (until 2020) – expert in building VBIEDs; executed by Lake Chad governor Baba Kaka on charges of dealing drugs |
| Head of the al-Furqan Office in the General Directorate of Provinces | Note: The al-Furqan Office serves as a coordination center for several IS branches, including ISWAP, IS-GS, and IS-Central. It is headquartered in IS-GS territory.: Abu Bakr ibn Muhammad ibn Ali al-Mainuki "Abubakar Mainok" (by 2023) |

=== Administration ===
In contrast to Boko Haram which mostly raided and enslaved civilians, ISWAP is known for setting up an administration in the territories where it is present. By 2022, International Crisis Group researchers estimated that 800,000 to over 3 million civilians lived under ISWAP rule. As IS maintains to be a state despite having lost its territory in the Middle East, ISWAP's ability to run a basic government is ideologically important for all of IS. Despite not fully controlling the areas where it is present, ISWAP maintains more control over large swaths of the countryside than the Nigerian government and had created four governorates by 2021. These governorates, centered at Lake Chad, Sambisa Forest, Timbuktu, and Tumbuma, are each headed by a wali and have their own governing structures. Each governorate has its own military commanders, and sends at least two representatives to ISWAP's shura. By early 2022, ISWAP acknowledged five sub-divisions or governorates, namely Lake Chad, Sambisa, Al Farouq (covering Timbuktu-Alagarno), Kerenoa (close to Lake Chad), and Banki (central Borno). Another sub-division or "cell", "Central Nigeria", became active in the following months, though this one appeared to solely operate as a guerrilla force instead of trying to capture territory. By late 2022, ISWAP's sub-units enjoyed a high level of autonomy.

In addition to funding delivered by IS-Central and supportive international businessmen, ISWAP collects taxes on agriculture, fishing, and trade in its territories. In return, it offers protection as well as some "limited services", including law enforcement. The group appoints its own police chiefs, and its police also enforces the hisbah. In ISWAP-held areas, the sharia law is enforced, including severe punishments such as the amputation of hands of thieves and the execution of adulterers. The sharia courts also offer to settle disputes over cattle rustling and various other crimes, winning some acceptance among the rural population. ISWAP also punishes its own fighters who commit unauthorized abuses toward civilians.

The group makes considerable efforts to win local grassroots support, and has employed a "hearts and minds" policy toward the local communities. It encourages locals to live in de facto rebel-held communities. Among its taxes, ISWAP also collects the zakat, a traditional Muslim tax and form of almsgiving which is used to provide for the poor. ISWAP's zakat has been featured in propaganda distributed by IS's newspaper, al-Naba. ISWAP's "Zakat Office" is known to operate fairly systematically and effectively, raising substantial funds to support both ISWAP as well as local civilians. Experts Tricia Bacon and Jason Warner have described ISWAP's taxation system as being locally less corrupt and more fair than that of the Nigerian state; some local traders argue that ISWAP creates a better environment for trade in rice, fish, and dried pepper. However, ISWAP militants are also known to kill those who refuse to pay taxes. The group also provides various health services, builds public toilets and boreholes, and has implemented its own education system based on Jihadist literature. At the same time, ISWAP is known for targeting agencies providing humanitarian aid, thereby depriving locals of basic necessities in government-held areas. It has also massacred civilians who collaborate with the local governments or disobey ISWAP orders, as well as persecuted the Christian minority in its territory.

In 2022, Nigeria announced its intention to redesign its currency in an effort to combat corruption and the financing of terrorism. ISWAP responded by declaring that from then on, people should pay their taxes to the group in CFA franc.

=== Military strength ===
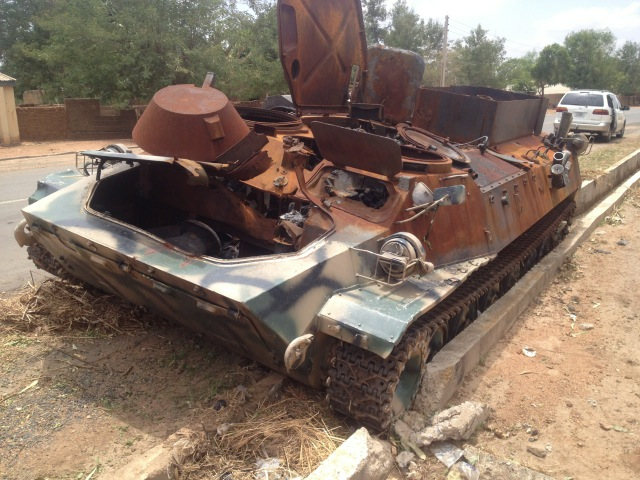
MT-LB which had been captured and used by ISWAP before its destruction in March 2015

ISWAP's strength has fluctuated over the years, and estimates accordingly vary. In 2017, researchers put its strength at around 5,000 militants. By the next year, it was believed to have shrunk to circa 3,000. The group experienced a surge and regained much power in 2019, resulting in researchers estimating that it had grown to 5,000 or up to 18,000 fighters. By 2020, the United States Department of Defense publicly estimated that ISWAP had 3,500 to 5,000 fighters. By late 2022, ISWAP's governorates appeared to differ in their tactics and equipment, ranging from the Lake Chad subdivision which deploys large numbers of uniformed, well-armed troops to the members of the "Central Nigeria" cell that is small in numbers and specializes in covert warfare and terrorist attacks. In times of manpower shortages, ISWAP forcibly conscripts civilians into its ranks. Though these conscriptions can be direct in the form of militants entering villages and rounding up men, the group has also used economic pressure by raising very high taxes and then offering tax exemptions for those willing to take up arms.

ISWAP is known to employ inghimasi forlorn hope/suicide attack shock troops as well as armoured fighting vehicles (AFVs). Throughout its history, ISWAP has repeatedly seized tanks including T-55s, and armoured personnel carriers such as the BTR-4EN, and then pressed them into service. The group also relies heavily on motorcycles, technicals, and captured military tactical/utility vehicles such as Kia KLTVs and CS/VP3 "Bigfoot" MRAPs. ISWAP is also capable of building armored improvised fighting vehicles, using parts of captured military vehicles.

In addition, ISWAP has established a "Khilafah Cadet School" for 8–16 old boys. These are carefully selected, indoctrinated and given physical as well as military training. The child soldiers were featured in an ISWAP propaganda video titled "The Empowerment Generation", showing them executing captured Nigerian soldiers. IS-Central had utilized child soldiers known as "Cubs of the Caliphate" from 2014 to 2017.
