= Nigeria church attack =

Nigeria church attack may refer to:

- Ondo church attack, 5 June 2022, in Ondo State
- 5 July 2015 Nigeria attacks, suicide bombing at an evangelical church in Potiskum, Yobe State
- December 2012 shootings in Northern Nigeria, 25 December 2012, at churches in Maiduguri and Potiskum
- Deeper Life Bible Church shooting, 7 August 2012, in the town of Otite
- Christmas 2011 Nigeria attacks, 25 December 2011, at multiple churches
