= 2015 Chad suicide bombings =

2015 Chad suicide bombings may refer to:

- 2015 N'Djamena bombings, in June and July
- Baga Sola bombings, in October
- December 2015 Chad suicide bombings
