= Operation Boma's Wrath =

Chadian military operation against Boko Haram in 2020

- Part of the Boko Haram insurgency
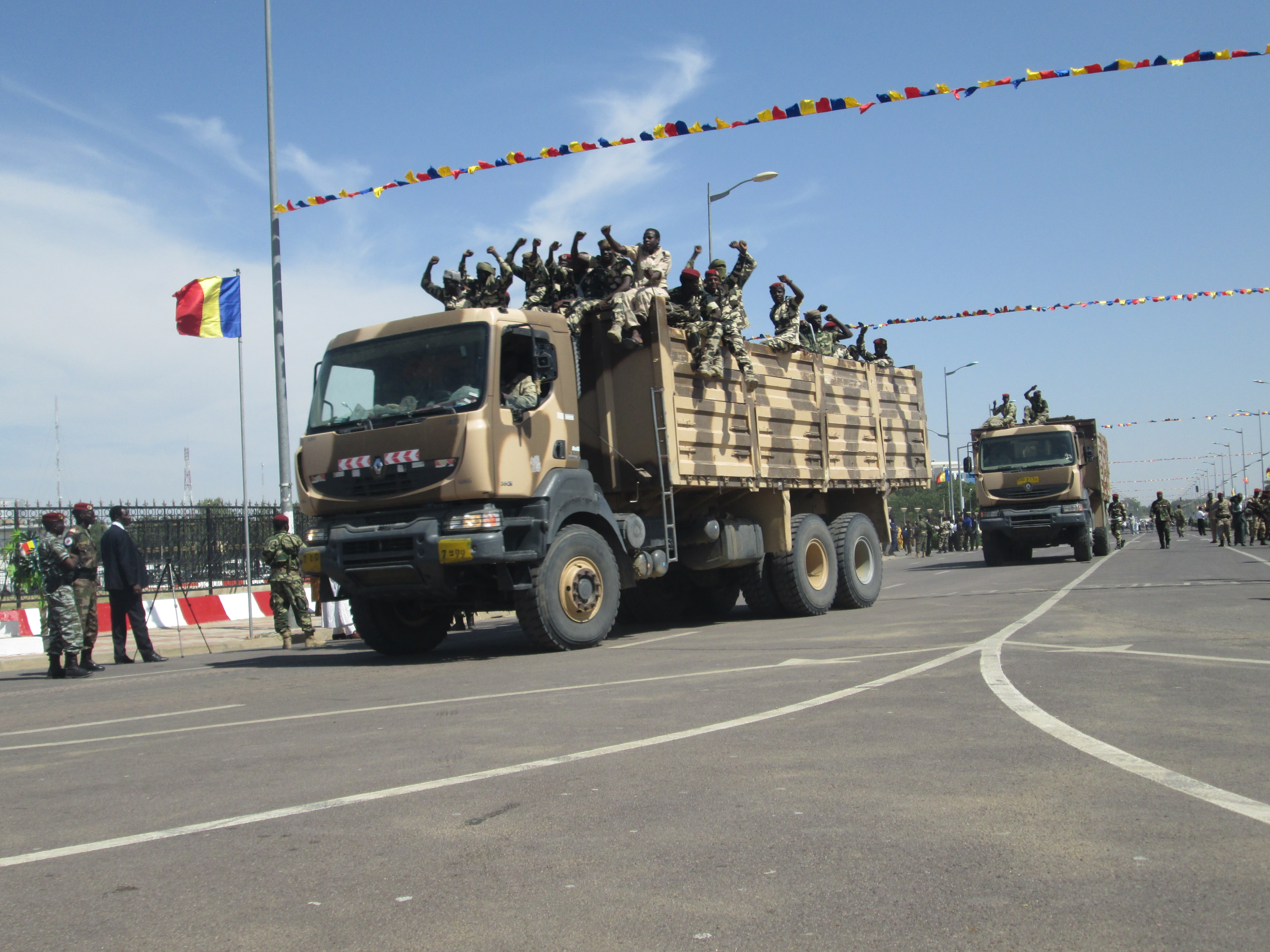
- Chadian troops return to N'Djamena on 13 April 2020 after the end of Operation Boma's Wrath
Date	31 March 2020 – 9 April 2020
Location	Chad: Lac region; Nigeria: Borno State; Niger: Diffa Region
Result	Chadian victory

Belligerents
Chad; Niger; Parts of Multinational Joint Task Force	Boko Haram

Commanders and leaders
Idriss Deby	Abubakar Shekau

Strength
Unknown	Unknown

Casualties and losses
52 killed 192 wounded	~ 1,000 killed 58 arrested 50 motorized boats destroyed
- At least 20,000 people displaced

Operation Boma's Wrath was a military operation launched by Chad against Boko Haram. Operation was launched on March 31, 2020, one week after Boko Haram's attack on Chadian military base in which 92 Chadian soldiers were killed. Aim of the operation was to destroy hidden jihadist bases and repulse their forces out of Chad. Operation lasted 10 days and according to Chadian military it resulted in roughly 1000 insurgents killed, their bases in Chad destroyed, and capture of arms caches previously taken from Chad.

== Background ==
On March 23, 2020 Boko Haram attacked Chadian military base on an island in Lake Chad. Chadian troops were attacked 5 AM and they fought against the insurgents until 12 PM when the insurgents left by speedboats. During the attack 92 Chadian soldiers were killed, 24 army vehicles destroyed, and weapons belonging to Chadian military were stolen. President of Chad, Idriss Deby traveled to the military base a day after the attack, he said that Chadian military has never lost so many men in one attack. Three days of national mourning for fallen soldiers were declared.

== Timeline ==
27 March 2020 – Fouli and Kaya departments of Lac region were declared a war zone and state of emergency came into effect in same departments. Several civilian communities fled the region.

31 March 2020 – Operation begun and Chad deployed forces to neighboring countries Niger and Nigeria, President of Chad, Idriss Deby confirmed that his country has an agreement with Niger and Nigeria.

1 April 2020 – First fighting occurred. Video of Chadian soldiers singing morale-rising victory songs, as well as video of Chadian soldiers beating unconscious bodies of terrorists to death were obtained and released by PR Nigeria.

2 April 2020 – Prefect of Fouli department announced that 20,000 people have been displaced from the areas of military operation, since the beginning of the operation.

3 April 2020 – Chadian military announced that in first 48 hours of operation, 76 jihadists have been killed while 7 Chadian soldiers lost their lives. Abubakar Shekau, leader of Boko Haram called for resistance by his troops in audio tape which was released.

4 April 2020 – President of Chad, Idriss Deby announced that all islands on the Lake Chad were cleared of terrorist presence, he applauded the work of defense forces of his country.

5 April 2020 – President of Chad, Idriss Deby announced that Chadian forces destroyed five Boko Haram bases, he also announced that Chadian territory has been cleared of terrorists. Several wounded Chadian soldiers were transferred to the hospital in N'Djamena.

6 April 2020 – Chadian soldiers fought Boko Haram in Magumeri in Nigeria, they allegedly freed Nigerian soldiers held captive. Some Nigerians on social media praised Idriss Deby for his efforts against jihadists, while some others have strongly condemned his decision to lead his troops to Nigerian soil. Idriss Deby told leader of Boko Haram, Abubakar Shekau "to surrender or die". Chadian government spokesman confirmed that Chadian territory has been completely cleared of terrorist presence.

7 April 2020 – Abubakar Shekau responded to Idriss Deby saying that Boko Haram will go after him, Abubakar also said that despite the setback inflicted on his group by Chadian army they will continue to fight.

9 April 2020 – Chadian army announced that around 1000 Boko Haram fighters have been killed and that 50 of their motorized boats have been destroyed, while 52 Chadian soldiers were killed and 192 wounded. Military spokesman also said that Chadian soldiers have been deployed on the Lake Chad banks of Niger and Nigeria and that they will remain there until forces of these two countries arrive.

== Aftermath ==
On 19 April 2020 44 out of 58 arrested suspected Boko Haram terrorists died of poisoning in prison in Chad. Pathologist's report revealed that a lethal substance was found in bodies of dead prisoners.

Despite the success of the operation Boko Haram attacks in Chad still continue, killing both military personnel and civilians.
