= Kabiru Sokoto =

Convicted Nigeria terrorist

Kabiru Umar Abubakar Dikko predominantly known by his sobriquet Kabiru Sokoto is a convicted Nigerian terrorist and a member of the Nigerian Boko Haram terrorist group, Boko Haram. He was born in Northern Nigeria which is predominantly occupied by the Hausa people and Fulani tribe. He was the mastermind of the Christmas Day bombing of the St Theresa Roman Catholic church on 25 December 2011 in Madalla, Niger State which killed 37 Christians. Sokoto was arrested, fled custody the following day and was rearrested a month later. On 21 December 2013, Sokoto was sentenced to life imprisonment. During his trial, the presiding judge said that Sokoto had shown no remorse for his actions.
