= Easter bombing =

Easter bombing may refer to:

- April 2012 Kaduna bombings, 8 April 2012, Easter Sunday
- 2016 Lahore suicide bombing, 27 March 2016, Easter Sunday
- 2019 Sri Lanka Easter bombings, 21 April 2019, Easter Sunday
