= Boko Haram insurgency =

Insurgency in Sub-Saharan Africa

- Part of the religious violence in Nigeria, the war against the Islamic State, the war in the Sahel, and the war on terror
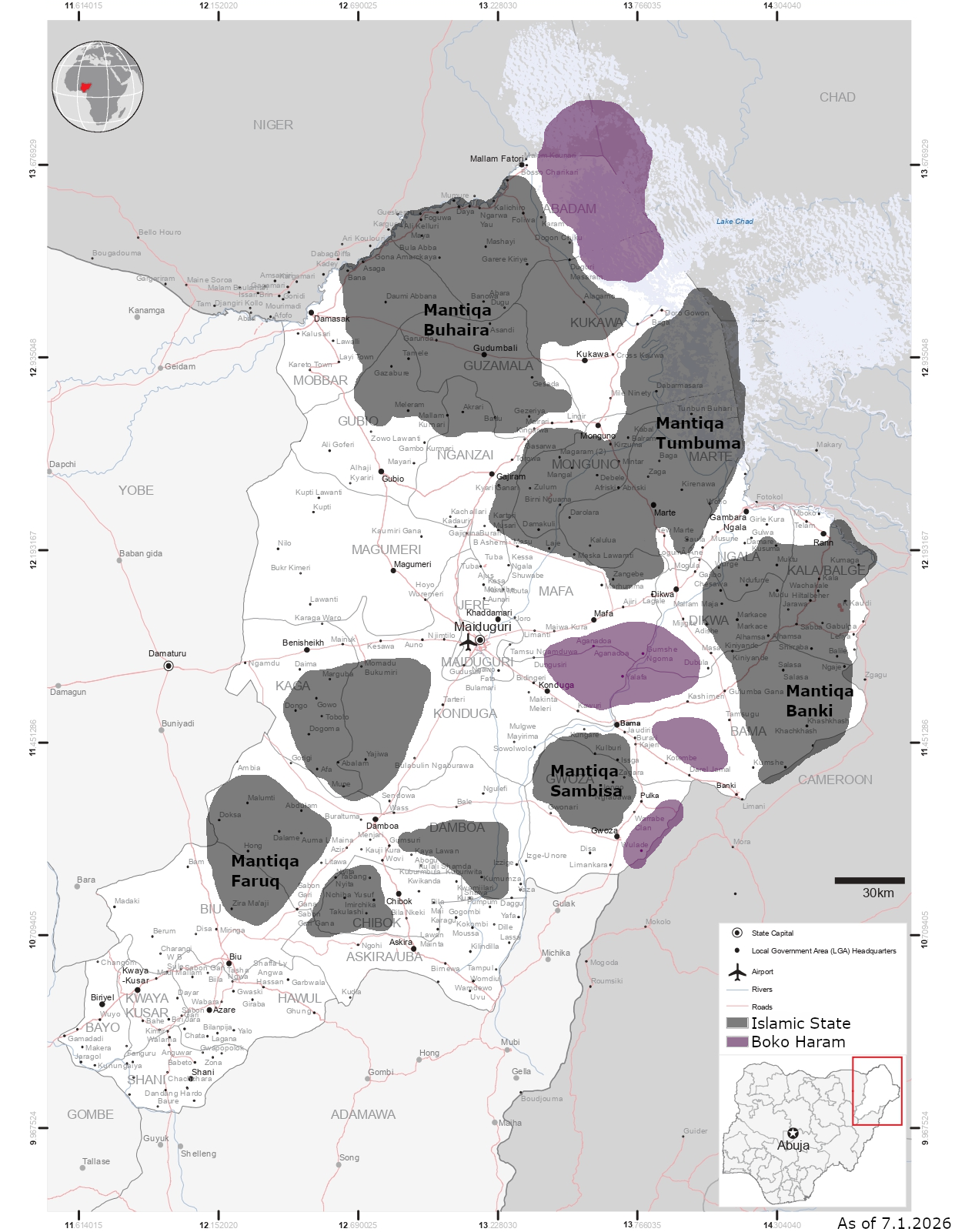
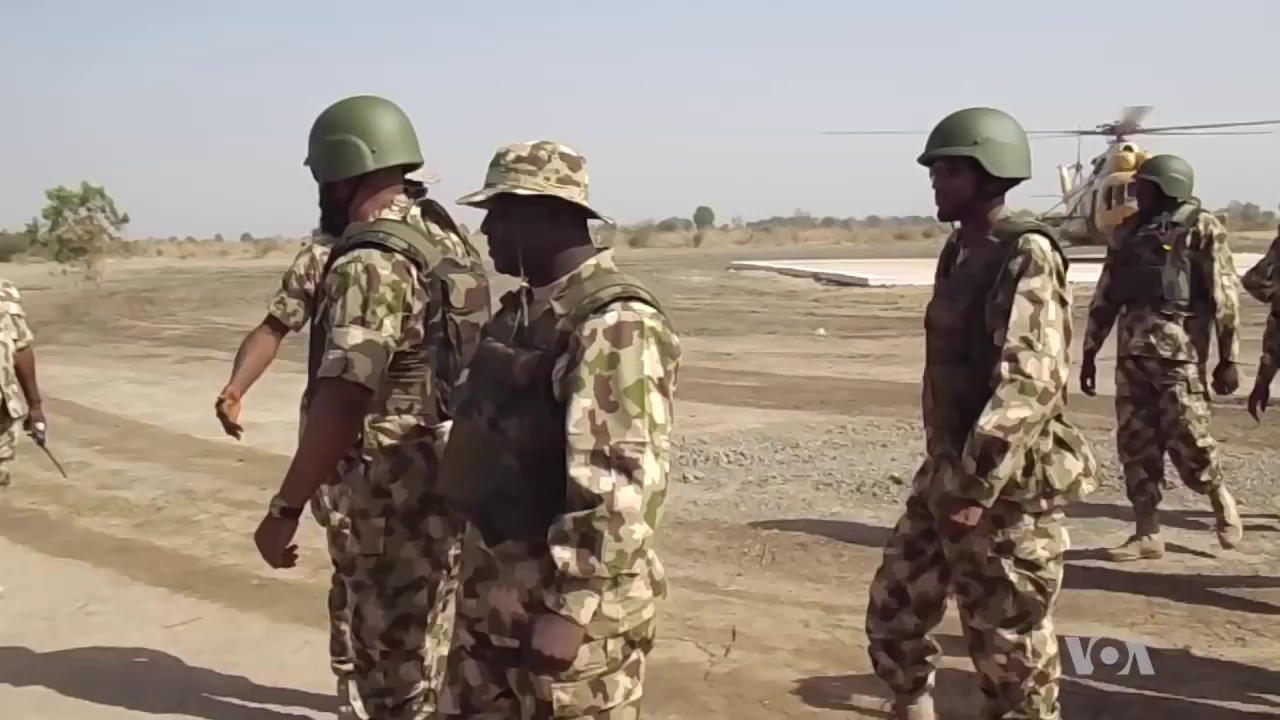
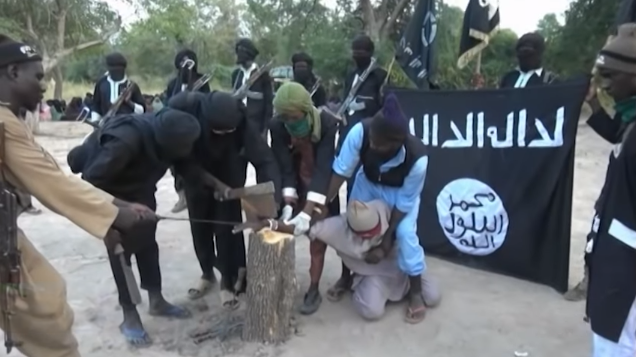
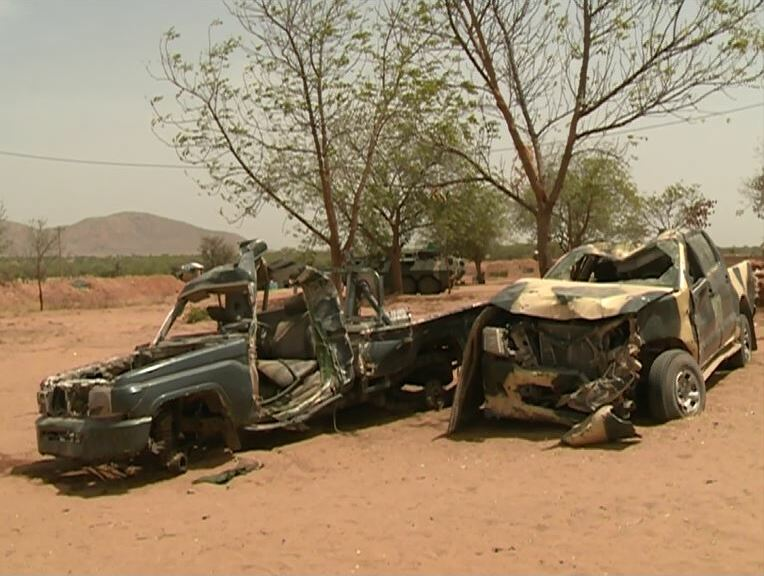
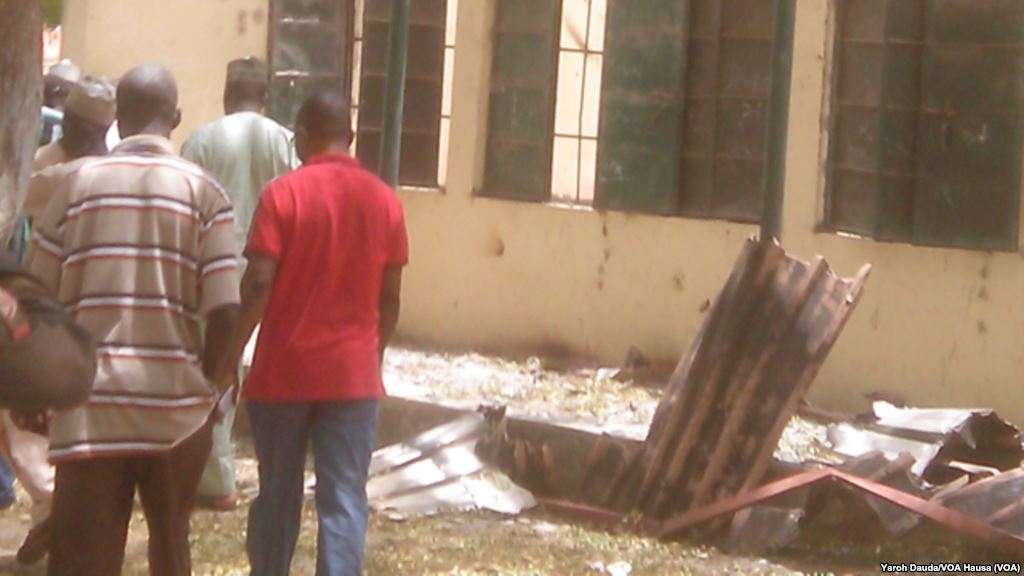
- Clockwise from top left: Military situation as of 2026; Nigerian troops conduct military drills in Sambisa Forest; Boko Haram vehicles destroyed by Cameroonian forces; U.S. airstrikes targeting Islamic State and bandits, Sokoto State; Citizens examining the ruins after the Chibok schoolgirls kidnapping; Boko Haram cutting the hand of a man
Date	26 July 2009 – present (17 years, 3 months, 1 week and 4 days)
Location	Northern Nigeria; Northern Cameroon (from 2012); Northern Mali (2012-2013); Southeast Niger (from 2015); Western Chad (from 2015); Northern Benin (from 2022)
Status	Ongoing (map of the current military situation); Expansion of conflict into neighboring Cameroon, Chad, Mali, and Niger; Turkish forces and Syrian mercenaries deployed to Niger; Coalition offensive in 2015 forces Boko Haram to retreat into the Sambisa Forest; Abubakar Shekau's suicide on 19 May 2021 amid ISWAP's capture of Sambisa Forest; Boko Haram–ISWAP conflict; U.S. intervention (2025-2026)

Belligerents
Nigeria; Cameroon; Niger; Chad; Benin; United States (2025-2026)	(Islamic State) Boko Haram; Bandits Al-Qaeda	Islamic State; Boko Haram (2015-2016); Bandits

Commanders and leaders
(Nigeria) Bola Tinubu; (Nigeria) Muhammadu Buhari #; (Nigeria) Goodluck Jonathan; (Nigeria) Umaru Yar'Adua #; (Nigeria) Olufemi Oluyede; (Nigeria) Christopher Musa; (Nigeria) Lucky Irabor; (Nigeria) Abayomi Olonisakin; (Nigeria) Alex Badeh X; (Nigeria) Nuhu Ribadu; (Nigeria) Babagana Monguno; (Nigeria) Sambo Dasuki; (Nigeria) Owoye Azazi †; (Nigeria) Sunday Aneke; (Nigeria) Hasan Abubakar; (Nigeria) Sisaka Amao; (Nigeria) Sadique Abubakar; (Nigeria) Waidi Shaibu; (Nigeria) Olufemi Oluyede; (Nigeria) Taoreed Lagbaja #; (Nigeria) Faruk Yahaya; (Nigeria) Ibrahim Attahiru †; (Nigeria) Tukur Buratai; (Nigeria) Kenneth Minimah; (Nigeria) Azubuike Ihejirika; (Nigeria) Abdulrahman Dambazau; (Niger) Abdourahamane Tiani; (Niger) Mohamed Bazoum (Niger) Mahamadou Issoufou (Chad) Mahamat Déby Itno (Chad) Idriss Déby † (Cameroon) Paul Biya (United States) Donald Trump (2025-2026)	Boko Haram: Mohammed Yusuf (executed); Abubakar Shekau ‡‡ Bakura Sahalaba †; Bakura Doro; Sadiku; Hassan Buduma; Mohd Hassan; Abu Khalid †; Bandits: Dogo Giɗe; Bello Turji; Ali Kachalla † Iyad Ag Ghaly; Sedane Ag Hita; Abubakar Adam Kambar †; Khalid Barnawi (POW)	ISWAP: (Islamic State) Abu Musab al-Barnawi; Sani Shuwaram †; Ba Idrisa (MIA); Bo Lawan ("Lawan Abubakar") (Islamic State) Huozaifah Ibn Sadiq (Islamic State) Ameer Habib Tajje (Islamic State) Ba’ana Gana (executed) (Islamic State) Abu-Bilal al-Minuki X

Units involved
Nigeria and allies; Multinational Joint Task Force; Civilian Joint Task Force; Local militias and vigilantes; Comités de vigilance (Chad, Cameroon); Dan banga (Niger); Foreign mercenaries; Sultan Murad Division (from 2024); STTEP	(Islamic State) Daular Musulunci; (Islamic State) Boko Haram (Note: Following Mohammed Yusuf's death, Boko Haram splintered into numerous factions which no longer operated under a unified leadership. Though Abubakar Shekau eventually became the preeminent commander of the movement, he never really controlled all Boko Haram groups. Instead, the factions were loosely allied, but also occasionally clashed with each other. This situation changed in 2015 when Shekau pledged allegiance to ISIL. The leadership of ISIL eventually decided to replace Shekau as a local commander with Yusuf's son Abu Musab al-Barnawi, whereupon the movement split completely. Shekau no longer recognized the authority of ISIL's central command, and his loyalists started to openly fight the followers of al-Barnawi. Regardless, Shekau did never officially renounce his pledge of allegiance to ISIL as a whole; his forces are thus occasionally regarded as "second branch of ISWAP". Overall, the relation of Shekau with ISIL remains confused and ambiguous. In the Battle of Sambisa Forest of 2021 ISWAP fighters killed Shekau and al-Barnawi nominally remains head of ISWAP); (Islamic State) Several minor factions; (Islamic State) Shekau faction; (Islamic State) Njimiya camp dissidents (Note: Njimiya camp dissidents was a faction of Boko Haram led by four commanders of the Njimiya camp, that rebelled and waged a low-level anti-ISIS guerrilla campaign in Sambisa Forest following the Battle of Sambisa in 2022. The dissidents eventually surrendered to security forces in December 2022, having been defeated by the Islamic State.); (Islamic State) Sadiku faction; Foreign mercenaries; (Chad) Chadian mercenaries; (Libya) Libyan mercenaries; Bandits; Dogo Giɗe’s gang; Bello Turji’s gang; Ali Kachalla’s gang (until 2023); Al-Qaeda; (Al-Shabaab (militant group)) Al-Shabaab (Claimed, since 2022) (Note: See Owo church attack for more information.); JNIM (since 2025); Nigerian Brigade; Ansaru (since 2012) (Note: The exact origin of Ansaru is unclear, but it had already existed as Boko Haram faction before officially announcing its foundation as separate group on 1 January 2012. The group had no known military presence in Nigeria from 2015, but several of its members appear to be still active. The group appear allied with rag-tag factions in the Nigerian bandit conflict and were recently behind the Abuja–Kaduna train attack)	Islamic State; (Islamic State) Boko Haram (Note: IS Province from 2015–2016); (Islamic State) ISWAP (Note: from 2016, originally Barnawi faction of Boko Haram); Buhaira Wilaya; Buhaira Mantiqa; Tunbuma Mantqa; Banki Mantiqa; Faruq Wilaya; Faruq Mantiqa; Sambisa Mantiqa; 'Nigeria Wilaya' (Note: Official name is unknown); Amniyya; Hizbah police; (Islamic State) ISSP; Lakurawa (since 2023)

Strength
Nigerian Army: 130,000 active personnel; 32,000 active reserves; Nigeria Police Force: 371,800; MNJTF: 7,500 (excluding Cameroon and Nigeria); Cameroon Armed Forces: 20,000 active personnel; 300 U.S. advisers; Militias and vigilantes: Unknown; tens of thousands	Fluctuating; thousands to tens of thousands on average (Note: The number of Boko Haram fighters in 2014 was heavily disputed and varied greatly according to different sources: The U.S. Department of State argued that the group had "hundreds to a few thousand" troops, whereas the Cameroonian Ministry of Defense stated that there were 15,000 to 20,000 Boko Haram militants. A Nigerian journalist even suggested that the group had up to 50,000 followers. Analysts Jason Warner and Charlotte Hulme discounted the higher estimates as "verg[ing] on the ludicrous". By 2015, 4,000 to 10,000 rebels were believed to be active. In 2017, ISWAP (the Barnawi faction) was believed to have 5,000 fighters, whereas Shekau's group counted just 1,000 militants. In 2018, ISWAP had shrunk to 3,000, while the Shekau faction was still estimated at 1,000. By 2019, ISWAP had grown to 5,000–18,000.)	

Casualties and losses
Unknown	Thousands killed, captured, or surrendered	
- 350,000 deaths in total, 35,000 of which being direct 2,400,000 internally displaced

The Boko Haram insurgency began in July 2009, when the militant Islamist and jihadist rebel group Boko Haram started an armed rebellion against the government of Nigeria. Boko Haram targets both Muslims and Christians. Attacks are often directed at individuals perceived as supporting the Nigerian government or Islamic State after the split between them, including civil servants, local defense groups, Muslim leaders who oppose the group and other rebels like al-Qaeda and Islamic State. Most attacks are not based on the religion of the victims.

Boko Haram's initial uprising failed, and its leader Mohammed Yusuf was killed by the Nigerian government. He began the group in 2002 with a view of opposing western education with his followers. The movement consequently fractured into autonomous groups and started an insurgency, though rebel commander Abubakar Shekau managed to achieve a kind of primacy among the insurgents. Though challenged by internal rivals, such as Abu Usmatul al-Ansari's Salafist conservative faction and the Ansaru faction, Shekau became the insurgency's de facto leader and mostly kept the different Boko Haram factions from fighting each other, instead focusing on overthrowing the Nigerian government. Supported by other jihadist organizations including al-Qaeda and al-Shabaab, Shekau's tactics were marked by extreme brutality and explicit targeting of civilians.

After years of fighting, the insurgents became increasingly aggressive and began to seize large areas in northeastern Nigeria. The violence escalated dramatically in 2014 with 10,849 deaths, while Boko Haram drastically expanded its territories. At the same time, the insurgency spread to neighboring Cameroon, Chad, Mali, and Niger, thus becoming a major regional conflict in sub-Saharan Africa. Meanwhile, Shekau attempted to improve his international standing among jihadists by tacitly aligning with the Islamic State in March 2015, with Boko Haram becoming the "Islamic State's West Africa Province" (ISWAP).

The insurgents were driven back during the 2015 West African offensive by a Nigeria-led coalition of African and Western countries, forcing the Islamists to retreat into Sambisa Forest and bases at Lake Chad. Discontent about various issues consequently grew among Boko Haram. Dissidents among the movement allied themselves with ISWAP's central command and challenged Shekau's leadership, resulting in a violent split of the insurgents. Since then, Shekau and his group are generally referred to as "Boko Haram", whereas the dissidents continued to operate as ISWAP under Abu Musab al-Barnawi. The two factions consequently fought against each other while waging insurgencies against the local governments. After a period of reversals, Boko Haram and ISWAP launched offensives in 2018 and 2019, again growing in strength.

When Boko Haram's insurgency was at its peak in the mid-2010s, it was the world's deadliest terrorist organization in terms of the number of people it killed. In a bid to ensure dialog between the government and the deadly sect, the Jonathan administration set up a committee to grant amnesty to Boko Haram. Some details of the amnesty include the granting of pardons to Boko Haram fighters and also listening to different ethnic groups under the sect in a bid to end violence. This amnesty was rejected by the sect in an audio broadcast that was sent by its leader on the grounds that they are fighting to create an Islamic state in Nigeria's predominantly Muslim north and that it is the government that is committing atrocities against Muslims.

In May 2021, ISWAP attacked and overran Boko Haram militants in the Sambisa Forest and Shekau was killed during the fighting, reportedly using a suicide vest. In August, al-Barnawi was killed. After Shekau's death masses of Boko Haram militants surrendered while others defected to ISWAP. According to the Nigerian Defence Forces, by July 2023 over 100,000 rebels and their family members surrendered. A commander of the Joint Task Force expressed optimism that the Boko Haram crisis would end very soon, while advising the troops not to rest or give the terrorists a chance to recuperate, reorganise and start carrying out attacks, saying, "We are almost there, so let's maintain the momentum."

== Background ==
=== Nigerian statehood ===
Britain amalgamated both the northern and southern protectorates in 1914, about a decade after the defeat of the Sokoto Caliphate and other Islamic states by the British which were to constitute much of northern Nigeria. Sir Frederick Lugard assumed office as governor of both protectorates in 1912. The aftermath of the First World War saw Germany lose its colonies—one of which was Cameroon—to French, Belgian and British mandates. Cameroon was divided in French and British parts, the latter of which was further subdivided into southern and northern parts. Following a plebiscite in 1961, the Southern Cameroons elected to rejoin French Cameroon, while the Northern Cameroons opted to join Nigeria, a move which added to Nigeria's already large Muslim population. The territory made up much of what is now northeastern Nigeria.

=== Early religious conflict ===
Religious conflict in Nigeria dates as far back as 1953, and in the case of the town of Tafawa Balewa, to 1948. The Igbo massacre of 1966 in the north that followed the 1966 counter-coup had as a dual cause the Igbo officers' coup and pre-existing (sectarian) tensions between the Igbos and the local Muslims. This was a major factor in the Biafran secession and the resulting Nigerian Civil War.

=== Maitatsine ===
In the late 1970s and early 1980s, there was a major Islamic uprising led by Maitatsine (Mohammed Marwa) and his followers, Yan Tatsine that led to several thousand deaths. After Maitatsine's death in 1980, the movement continued for some five years more.

In the 1980s the erstwhile military ruler of Nigeria, General Ibrahim Babangida enrolled Nigeria in the Organisation of the Islamic Conference. This was a move which aggravated religious tensions in the country, particularly among the Christian community. In response, some in the Muslim community pointed out that certain other African member states have smaller proportions of Muslims, as well as Nigeria's diplomatic relations with the Holy See.

=== Establishment of sharia ===
Status of sharia in Nigerian states (in 2013): Sharia applies in full, including criminal law Sharia applies only in personal status issues No sharia

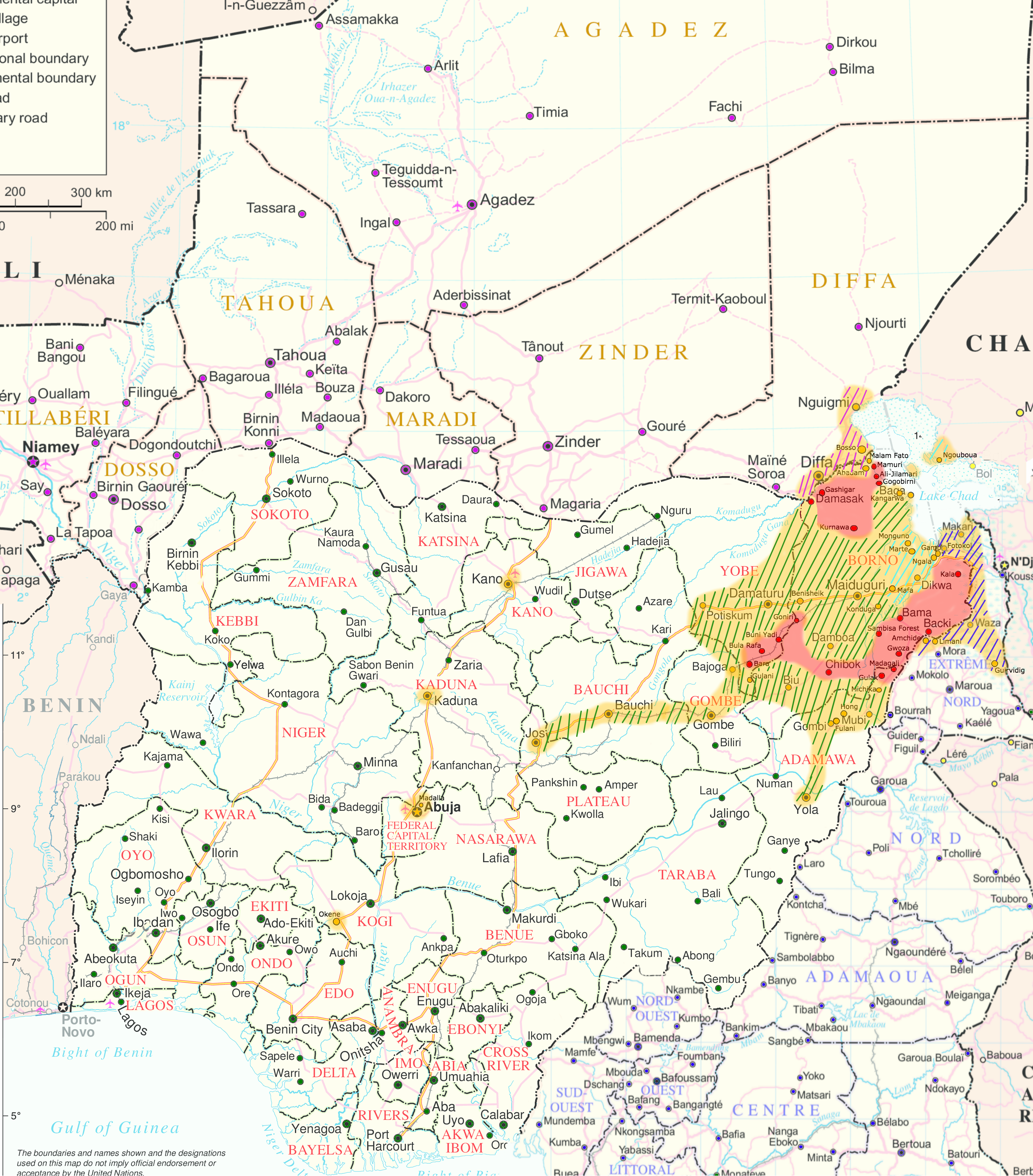
Boko Haram in the Lake Chad Region, as of 14 March 2015

Since the return of democracy to Nigeria in 1999, sharia has been instituted as a main body of civil and criminal law in 9 Muslim-majority and in some parts of 3 Muslim-plurality states, when Zamfara State Governor Ahmad Rufai Sani began the push for the institution of sharia at the state level of government. This was followed by controversy as to the would-be legal status of non-Muslims in the sharia system. A spate of Muslim-Christian riots soon emerged.

In the primarily Islamic northern states of Nigeria, a variety of Muslim groups and populations exist, who favour the nationwide introduction of sharia. The demands of these populations have been at least partially upheld by the Nigerian federal government in 12 states, first in Zamfara State in 1999. The implementation has been widely attributed as being caused by the insistence of Sani.

The 2002 death sentences of Amina Lawal and Safiya Hussaini attracted international attention to what many saw as the harsh regime of these laws. These sentences were later overturned; the first execution was carried out in 2002.

==== Blasphemy and apostasy ====
Twelve out of Nigeria's 36 states have Sunni Islam as the dominant religion. In 1999, those states chose to have sharia courts as well as customary courts. A sharia court may treat blasphemy as deserving of several punishments up to and including execution. In many predominantly Muslim states, conversion from Islam to another religion is illegal and often a capital offence.

=== Demographic balance ===
According to a Nigerian study on demographics and religion, Muslims make up 50.5% of the population. Muslims mainly live in the north of the country; the majority of Nigerian Muslims are Sunnis. Christians are the second-largest religious group and make up 48.2% of the population. They predominate in the central and southern parts of the country. For reasons of avoiding political controversy, questions of religion were forgone in the 2006 Nigerian census.

== History ==
=== Beginnings and 2009 uprising ===
Mohammed Yusuf began Boko Haram in 2002 with a view of opposing western education with his followers. Boko Haram conducted its operations more or less peacefully during the first seven years of its existence. That changed in 2009 when the Nigerian government launched an investigation into the group's activities following reports that its members were arming themselves. Prior to that the government reportedly repeatedly ignored warnings about the increasingly militant character of the organisation, including that of a military officer.

Yusuf was arrested at his parent inlaws' house by the Nigerian military and subsequently handed over to the Nigerian police. When the government came into action, several members of the group were arrested in Bauchi, sparking deadly clashes with Nigerian security forces in Bauchi, Maiduguri, Potiskum, and Wudil, which led to the deaths of an estimated 700 people. Boko Haram fighters reportedly "used fuel-laden motorcycles" and "bows with poison arrows" to attack a police station. Yusuf was killed while in police custody. He was survived by four wives and 12 children, one of whom was Abu Musab al-Barnawi. After Yusuf's killing, Abubakar Shekau became the leader and held this position in January 2015.

The movement consequently fractured into autonomous groups and started an insurgency, though rebel commander Abubakar Shekau managed to achieve a kind of primacy among the insurgents. Though challenged by internal rivals, such as Abu Usmatul al-Ansari's Salafist conservative faction and the Ansaru faction, Shekau became the insurgency's de facto leader and mostly kept the different Boko Haram factions from fighting each other, instead focusing on overthrowing the Nigerian government. Supported by other jihadist organizations including al-Qaeda and al-Shabaab, Shekau's tactics were marked by extreme brutality and explicit targeting of civilians.

=== 2010 resurgence ===
Nearly six months after the death of Yusuf, the group carried out its first terrorist attack in Borno in January 2010, killing four people. During the following few years, the violence escalated in terms of both frequency and intensity. On 7 September a prison break in Bauchi freed more than 700 Boko Haram militants, replenishing their force. On 24 December Boko Haram used four bombs to kill 32 people in Jos, Plateau State. On the same day, they killed six people in attacks against churches in Maiduguri.

=== 2011 ===
On 29 May 2011, a few hours after Goodluck Jonathan was sworn in as president, several bombings purportedly by Boko Haram killed 15 and injured 55. On 15 June the federal government began a military effort to counter the growing threat of Boko Haram's insurgency. With 21 Armoured Brigade of the Nigerian Army as its nucleus, Joint Task Force Operation Restore Order marked the start of the army's lengthy counter-insurgency campaign against Boko Haram. Results were mixed, and the army was criticised for being too kinetic.

On 16 June, Boko Haram claimed responsibility for the Abuja police headquarters bombing, the first known suicide attack in Nigeria. On 26 August the United Nations building in Abuja was bombed, signifying the first time that Boko Haram attacked an international organisation. On 4 November, Boko Haram carried out attacks in Damaturu, Yobe, and in Maiduguri, killing over a hundred people, and on 22 and 23 December clashing with security forces, resulting in at least 68 deaths. On 25 December, Boko Haram attacked several churches with bombings and shootings.

=== 2012 ===
In January 2012, Boko Haram attacked Mubi, Yola and Gombi – all in Adamawa State – in addition to Maiduguri and Kano. During the same month, Shekau appeared in a video posted on YouTube. According to Reuters, Shekau took control of the group after Yusuf's death in 2009. Authorities had previously believed that Shekau died during the 2009 uprising.

By early 2012, the group was responsible for over 900 deaths. On 8 March, a small Special Boat Service team and the Nigerian Army attempted to rescue two hostages, Briton Chris McManus and Italian Franco Lamolinara, being held in Sokoto by members of Boko Haram. Both hostages were killed by their captors before or during the rescue attempt. All the hostage takers were reportedly killed.

On 8 April, at least 38 people were killed by a suicide car bomber in Kaduna. On 24 June, about 40 inmates escaped during a prison break in Damaturu. On 17 June, at least 12 people were killed by three bombings of churches in Kaduna State. On 7 August, 19 people were killed in a mass shooting in Kogi State. On 1–2 November, at least 25 men were killed at the Federal Polytechnic, Mubi. On 25 December, 12 people were killed in Potiskum and Maiduguri. On 28 December, 15 people were killed in a village in northeastern Nigeria.

=== 2013 ===
On 8 February 2013 gunmen killed at least nine polio vaccinators in Kano. On 18 March, a suicide car bomber rammed a bus in Kano, killing over 20 people. On 16 and 17 April, dozens of civilians were killed during a battle in Baga between Boko Haram and the Nigerian Army.

In May 2013, government forces launched an offensive in the Borno region in an attempt to dislodge Boko Haram fighters after a state of emergency was called. The state of emergency applied to the states of Borno, Yobe, and Adamawa. The offensive had initial success, but the Boko Haram rebels were able to regain their strength. Several authors have cited the frailty of the Nigerian security system and corruption in the management of the military as some of the factors that allowed Boko Haram to regain their strength during this period.

On 6 July, Boko Haram massacred 42 students in Yobe, bringing the school year to an early end. On 5 August, Boko Haram launched dual attacks on Bama and Malam Fatori, leaving 35 dead. On 11 August, Boko Haram killed 44 people in a mass shooting at a mosque in Konduga, Borno. On 6 October, the Nigerian Army won a battle against Boko Haram in Damboa, Borno. On 2 November in Borno, gunmen attacked a convoy returning from a wedding, killing over 30 people.

=== 2014 ===
==== Chibok kidnapping and ambush ====
On 15 April 2014, terrorists abducted about 276 teenage female pupils from a secondary school in Chibok, Borno. The abduction was widely attributed to Boko Haram. It was reported that the group had taken the girls to neighbouring Cameroon and Chad where they were to be sold into marriages at a price below a dollar each. The abduction of another eight girls was reported later. These kidnappings raised public protests, with some protesters holding placards bearing the Twitter tag #BringBackOurGirls, which had caught international attention.

The Guardian reported that the British Royal Air Force (RAF)conducted Operation Turus in response to the Chibok kidnapping. A source involved with the operation told The Observer "The girls were located in the first few weeks of the RAF mission", and "We [RAF] offered to rescue them, but the Nigerian government declined", this was because it viewed any action to be taken as a "national issue", and for it to be resolved by Nigerian intelligence and security services, the source added that the girls were then tracked by the aircraft as they were dispersed into progressively smaller groups over the following months. Several countries pledged support to the Nigerian government and to help their military with intelligence gathering on the whereabouts of the girls and the operational camps of Boko Haram. On 13–14 May, Boko Haram ambushed Nigerian soldiers who were searching for the kidnapped girls.

==== Jos bombings ====
On 20 May, two bombs in Jos, Plateau State, were detonated, killing at least 118 people and injuring more than 56 others. The bombs exploded 30 minutes apart, one at a local marketplace at approximately 3:00 and the second in a parking lot next to a hospital at approximately 3:30, where rescuers responding to the first accident were killed. Though no group or individual claimed responsibility, the attacks were attributed to Boko Haram.

First responders were unable to reach the scene of the accidents, as "thousands of people were fleeing the scene in the opposite direction". The bombs had been positioned to kill as many people as possible, regardless of religion, which differed from previous attacks in which non-Muslims were targeted. The bombers were reported to have used a "back-to-back blast" tactic, in which an initial bomb explodes at a central location, and another explodes a short time later with the intent to kill people working to rescue the wounded.

==== Maiduguri bombings ====
Boko Haram militants increased their attacks on cities and towns in northern Nigeria and captured part of the northeast. These attacks included bombings in Maiduguri in January, in July, and November.

==== Escalation in fighting ====
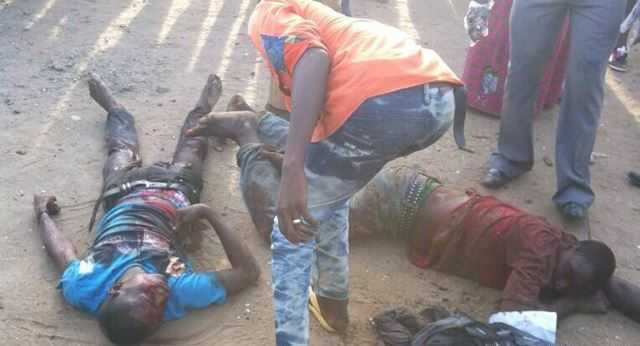
Victims of a Boko Haram bombing in November 2014

The increasing intensity of the insurgency prompted the government to launch an offensive, and with the help of Chad, Niger, and Cameroon, they recaptured many areas that were formerly under the control of Boko Haram.

In late 2014, Boko Haram seized control of Bama, according to the town's residents. In December, it was reported that "people too elderly to flee Gwoza Local Government Area were being rounded up and taken to two schools where the militants opened fire on them." Over 50 elderly people in Bama were killed. A "gory" video was released of insurgents shooting over a hundred civilians in a school dormitory in Bama.

=== 2015 ===
==== Baga massacre ====
Between 3 and 7 January 2015, Boko Haram attacked Baga and killed up to 2,000 people, perhaps the largest massacre by Boko Haram.

==== Maiduguri bombing ====
On 10 January, 19 people were killed in a suicide bombing at a market in Maiduguri. The city is at the heart of the Boko Haram insurgency. On 12 January, Boko Haram carried out an unsuccessful attack on a Cameroonian army base.

==== Counter-offensive against Boko Haram ====
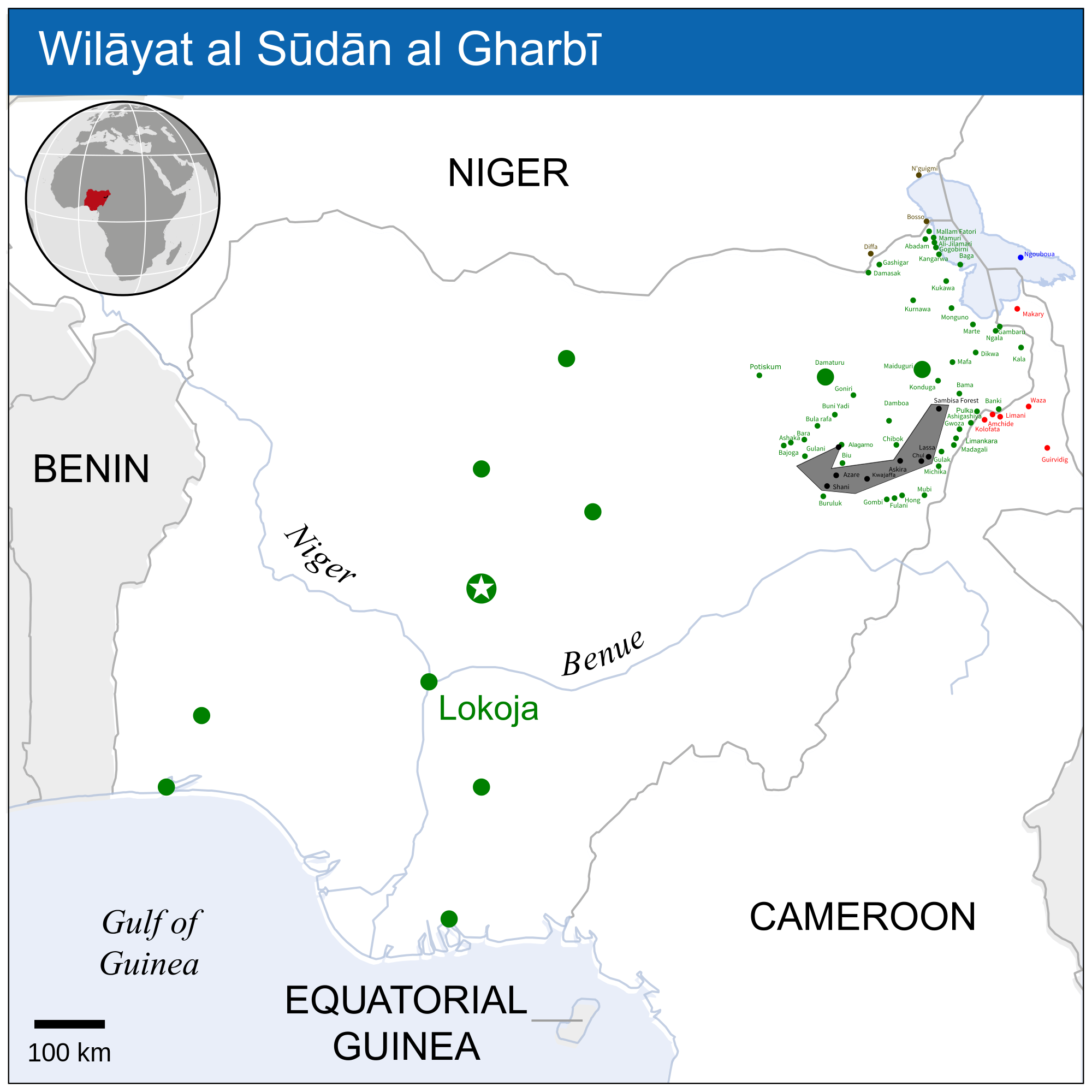
Map of Boko Haram's territorial control on 10 April, over 2 months after the start of the 2015 West African offensive

On 23 January, a coalition of military forces from Nigeria, Chad, Cameroon, and Niger began a counter-insurgency campaign against Boko Haram. In the early hours of 25 January, Boko Haram launched a major assault on Maiduguri. On 26 January, CNN reported that the attack on Maiduguri by "hundreds of gunmen" had been repelled, but the nearby town of Monguno was captured by Boko Haram. The Nigerian Army repelled another attack on Maiduguri on 31 January.

On 4 February, the Chad Army killed over 200 Boko Haram militants. On 4 and 5 February, Boko Haram carried out a massacre in Fotokol, Far North Region, Cameroon, killing 81 civilians, 13 Chadian soldiers and 6 Cameroonian soldiers. On 6 February, Boko Haram attacked Bosso and Diffa in Niger. On 15 February, a suicide bombing occurred in Damaturu. On 17 February, the Nigerian military retook Monguno in a coordinated air and ground assault. On 22 February, a suicide bombing occurred in Potiskum. On 24 February, suicide bombings occurred in Potiskum and Kano. On 2 March, the Nigerian Armed Forces defeated Boko Haram in the Battle of Konduga.

On 7 March, Shekau pledged allegiance to the Islamic State (IS) via an audio message posted on the organisation's Twitter account. Nigerian Army spokesperson Sami Usman Kukasheka said the pledge was a sign of weakness and that Shekau was like a "drowning man". That same day, five suicide bomb blasts left 54 dead and 143 wounded. On 12 March, IS spokesman Abu Mohammad al-Adnani released an audiotape in which he welcomed the pledge of allegiance, and described it as an expansion of the group's caliphate to West Africa.

Following its declaration of loyalty to IS, Boko Haram was designated as the group's "West Africa Province" (Islamic State – West Africa Province, or ISWAP), and Shekau was appointed as its first vali (governor). IS started to support Boko Haram but also began to interfere in its internal matters. For example, IS's central leadership attempted to reduce Boko Haram's brutality toward civilians and internal critics, as Shekau's ideology was "too extreme even for the Islamic State".

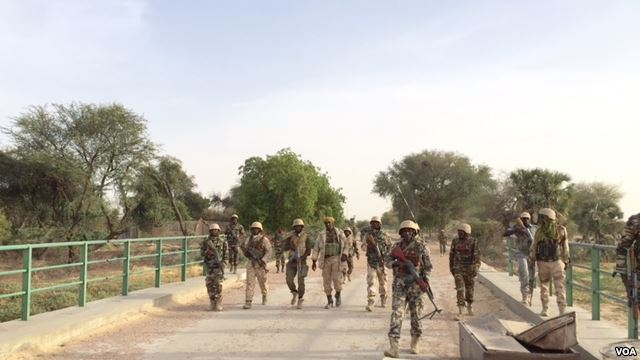
Niger Army soldiers during counter-insurgency operations against Boko Haram in March

On 16 March, Boko Haram lost control of Bama. On 24 March, residents of Damasak, Borno, said that Boko Haram had taken more than 400 women and children from the town as they fled from coalition forces who retook the area and found a mass grave of Boko Haram victims. On 27 March, the Nigerian army captured Gwoza, which was believed to be the location of Boko Haram headquarters. On the presidential election day, 28 March, Boko Haram killed 41 people, including a legislator, to discourage hundreds from voting.

The Nigerian authorities said that they had taken back 11 of the 14 districts previously controlled by Boko Haram. In April, four Boko Haram camps in the Sambisa Forest were overrun by the Nigerian military who freed nearly 300 females. Boko Haram forces were believed to have retreated to the Mandara Mountains, along the Cameroon–Nigeria border. In May, the Nigerian military announced that they had released about 700 women from camps in Sambisa Forest.

On 12 July, two female suicide bombers wearing burqas killed 13 people in Fotokol. In response, the governor of Cameroon's Far North banned the Islamic veil and burqa. In August, it was reported that over a thousand deaths had occurred since the inauguration of President Muhammadu Buhari. On 10 October, suicide bombers attacked a market and refugee camp in Baga Sola, Chad. On 28 October, it was announced that Nigerian troops had rescued 338 people from Boko Haram near the group's Sambisa Forest stronghold. Of those rescued, 192 were children and 138 were women.

In December Buhari claimed that Boko Haram was "technically defeated," and it was reported that 1,000 women had been rescued from Boko Haram in January 2016. On 5 December, four female suicide bombers attacked a market on the Chadian side of Lake Chad. On 28 December, female suicide bombers killed over 55 people in Madagali and Maiduguri.

==== American military support ====
In early October 2015, the United States military deployed 300 troops to Cameroon, with the approval of the Cameroonian government, with the primary mission of providing intelligence support to local forces and conducting reconnaissance flights. The troops also oversaw a program to transfer American military vehicles to the Cameroonian Army to aid in their fight against Islamist militants.

As of May 2016, U.S. personnel were involved in drone operations from Garoua, Far North Region, Cameroon, to help provide intelligence in the region to assist local forces. There were additional drone operations based out of Niger. U.S. Army soldiers in Cameroon are also providing IED awareness training to the country's infantry forces.

=== 2016 ===
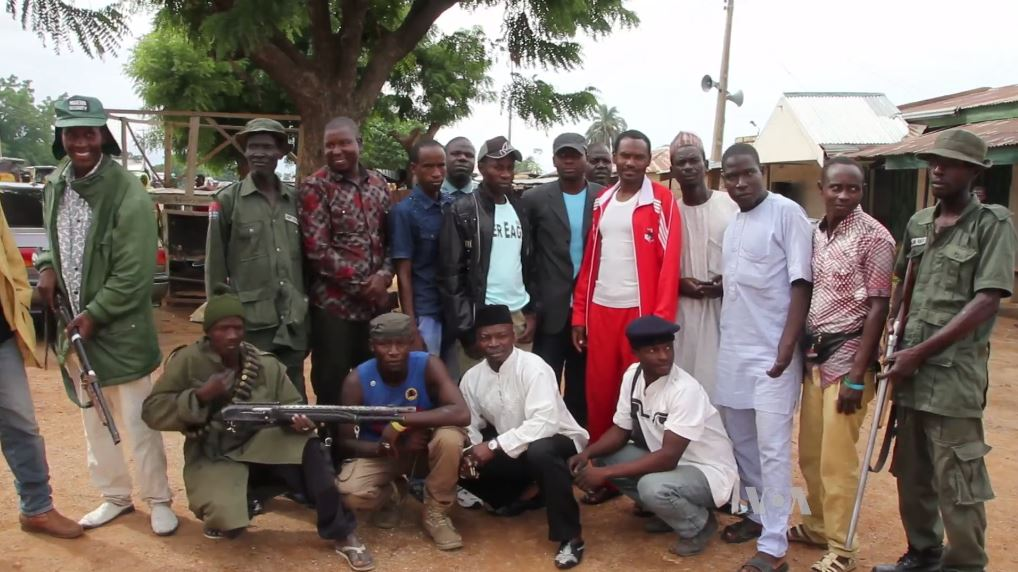
Civilian Joint Task Force fighters of Michika in 2016

On 25 January, four Boko Haram suicide bombers killed over 30 people in Bodo, Far North, Cameroon. On 30 January, at least 86 people were killed by Boko Haram in Dalori, Borno. On 9 February, two young female suicide bombers killed at least 60 people at an internally displaced persons' (IDP) camp in Dikwa, Borno. On 16 March, two female suicide bombers killed 22 people on the outskirts of Maiduguri.

==== Boko Haram-IS infighting and loss of territory ====
As Boko Haram's power waned, Shekau's leadership was increasingly criticised among Boko Haram and IS central command. These elements repeatedly attempted to convince Shekau to change his tactics or his extreme ideas (such as considering everyone an apostate who has not openly sided with him, including all Muslims). Shekau refused to budge and openly disobeyed "Caliph" Abu Bakr al-Baghdadi in regard to various matters. IS and parts of Boko Haram eventually came to the conclusion that this was no longer tolerable, whereupon Shekau was removed from his position as vali of ISWAP in August. Abu Musab al-Barnawi, a son of Boko Haram founder Mohammed Yusuf, was appointed as his successor.

This event resulted in an open split among the Nigerian insurgents. Shekau refused to accept his dismissal, rallied a large number of supporters, and violently opposed Barnawi and IS central command. In turn, Barnawi and those who were loyal to him declared Shekau's group Khawarij. The two insurgent factions subsequently became fully separate organizations, with Shekau's followers adopting their old name "Jamā'at Ahl as-Sunnah lid-Da'wah wa'l-Jihād" (outsiders refer to this faction as "Boko Haram"), whereas Barnawi's forces continued to operate as ISWAP. The two groups are generally hostile and fight each other, though it is possible that they occasionally cooperate against their common enemies.

On 31 August, Major General Lucky Irabor stated that the militants only controlled a few villages and towns near Lake Chad and in Sambisa Forest. He further stated that the military expected recapturing the final strongholds of the group within weeks. On 24 December Buhari said that Boko Haram had been ousted from their last stronghold in the Sambisa Forest, effectively reducing Boko Haram to an insurgent force. This victory left Boko Haram without any territorial holdings.

=== 2017 ===
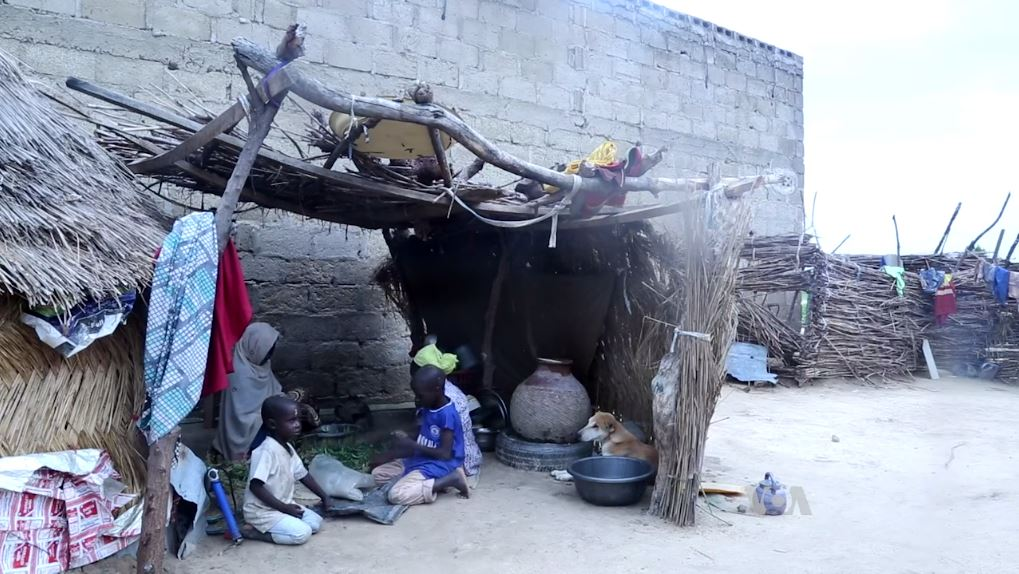
IDPs of the conflict in Maiduguri

On 7 January, a group of Boko Haram militants attacked a Nigerian Army base in Yobe, killing five soldiers. In response, the Nigerian Army launched retaliatory strikes and killed 15 militants. On 17 January, a Nigerian Air Force jet mistakenly bombed an IDP camp in Rann, Borno State, mistaking it for a Boko Haram encampment. The airstrike left 115 people dead. On 22 March, at least six people were killed and 16 wounded when four female suicide bombers blew themselves up on the outskirts of Maiduguri.

On 22 March, the Nigerian Department of State Services (DSS) announced that a suspected member of Boko Haram had been arrested in northeastern Yobe State. The suspect confessed to details of a plot to attack the American and British embassies, and other western targets in Abuja. The DSS later announced that between 25 and 26 March, five suspected members of Boko Haram had been arrested, thus thwarting the plot. On 2 April, the Nigerian military began what it said was its "final offensive" to retake Boko Haram's last strongholds. On 17 May, the Nigerian Army reported that it had arrested about 126 suspected Boko Haram terrorists at the IDP camp in Damboa, Borno.

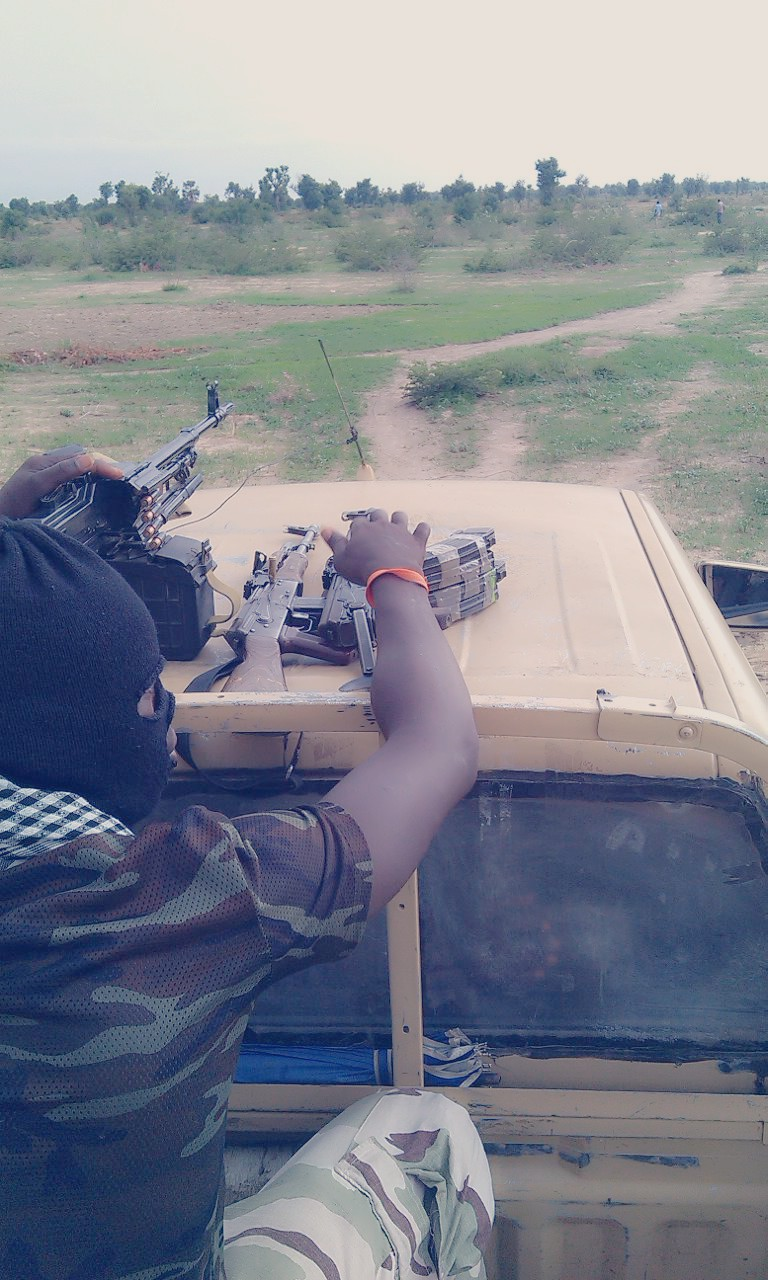
Nigerian Army soldiers during counter-insurgency operations against Boko Haram in November 2017

In September, Boko Haram militants kidnapped about 40 young adults, women and children and killed 18 in Banki, 130 km southeast of Maiduguri on the border of Nigeria and Cameroon. Boko Haram was reported to have killed 380 people between April and September in the Lake Chad area. About 57% of all schools in Borno State were closed due to the Boko Haram insurgency, affecting the education of about 3 million children.

On 21 November, a suicide bomber killed 50 people in a mosque in Mubi. In December, fighters who were believed to belong to ISWAP attacked a patrol of US Army Special Forces and Nigerian soldiers in the Lake Chad Basin Region in Niger. The coalition troops managed to repel the assault without suffering any casualties.

=== 2018 ===
On 16 February, three suicide bombers killed about 20 people in Konduga. On 19 February, Boko Haram kidnapped 110 schoolgirls from Dapchi, Yobe. By March, two main insurgent factions were still active and continued to wage an insurgency campaign against the government: the followers of Shekau operated mainly in southern Borno, while the faction of al-Barnawi was mostly located around Lake Chad.

On 26 April, Boko Haram bombers killed at least four civilians in the outskirts of Maiduguri. A subsequent gun battle and tear gas launched by security forces repelled the attackers but left two officers wounded and several others injured. On 1 May, two suicide bombers killed dozens of people in Mubi.

On 15 July, hundreds of Nigerian soldiers went missing after Boko Haram forces overran an army base in northeastern Nigeria. Less than 100 Nigerian soldiers returned after the attack. The attack came 24 hours after Boko Haram ambushed a military convoy in neighbouring Borno. The attack on the base resulted in a battle that lasted over an hour, it is unknown if there were any casualties in the assault, a local pro-government militia said the military had sustained some casualties. This attack marked Boko Haram's first major gain since 2015.

On 8 September, ISWAP fighters captured Gudumbali in central Borno, marking their first major gain in nearly two years. The next day, ISWAP released a video showing footage from the combat. In late December, ISWAP launched another offensive and captured Baga.

In November, fighting in and around Lake Chad intensified, beginning the Chad Basin campaign which lasted until February 2020. On 18 November, ISWAP fighters attacked a military base in Metele, Borno, killing at least 118 soldiers while at least 153 others were missing after the attack. The militants also seized tanks, armored vehicles, artillery, weapons, and ammunition.

=== 2019 ===
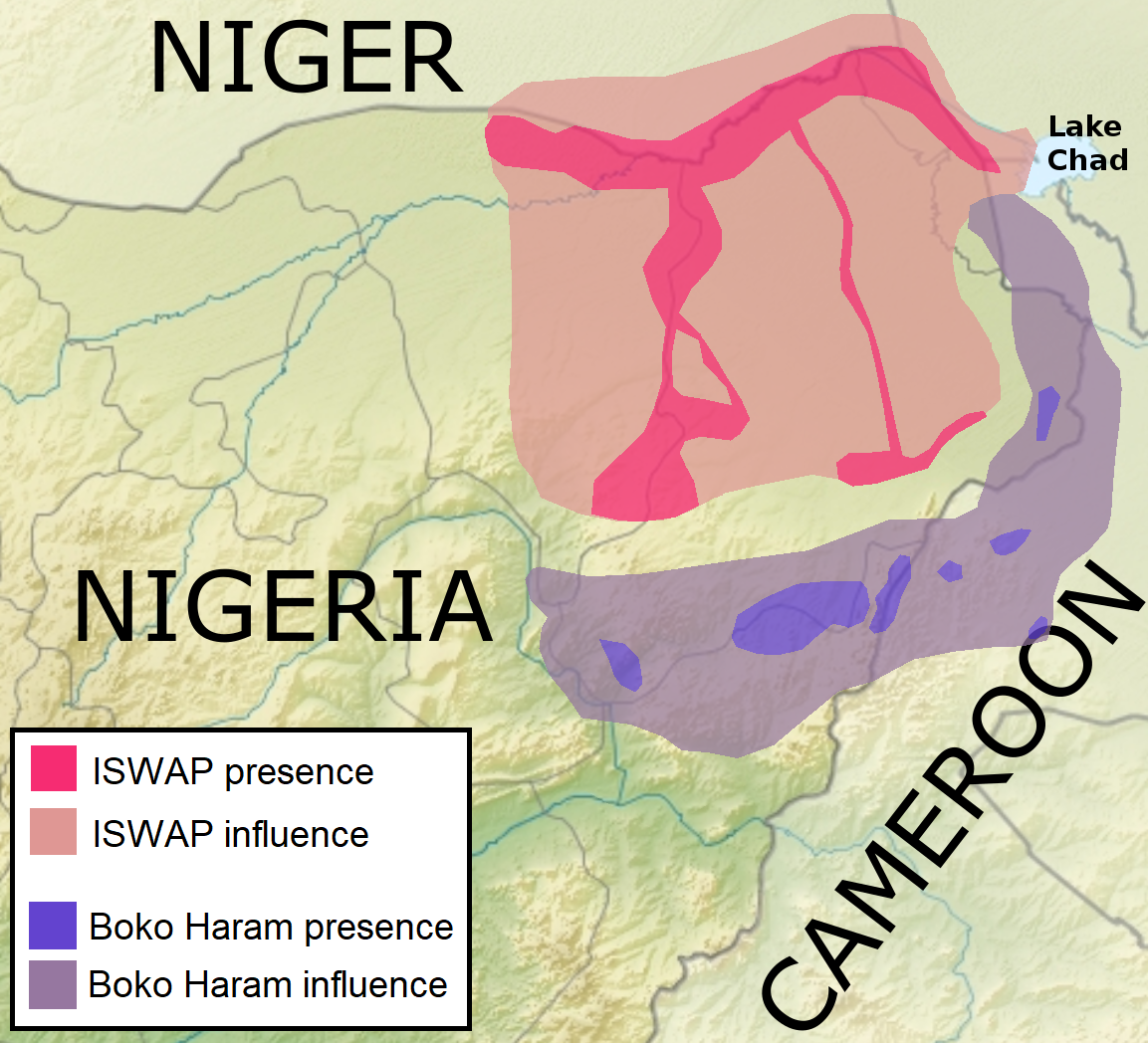
Presence and influence of ISWAP and Boko Haram in northern Nigeria, Cameroon, and Niger in early 2019, after the rebels' victories during the early Chad Basin campaign

ISWAP launched a major offensive in January 2019, attacking several Nigerian military bases, including those at Magumeri and Gajiram. Insurgents overran and destroyed the IDP camp at Rann, displacing its inhabitants yet again. The destruction of Rann was initially attributed to ISWAP, but Boko Haram later claimed responsibility. Three Boko Haram suicide bombers killed 30 people in Konduga on 16 June. Boko Haram killed at least 65 people in Nganzai, Borno, who were walking home from a funeral on 27 July.

=== 2020 ===
On 6 January 2020, Boko Haram bombed a market in Gamboru, Borno, killing at least 38 people. On 9 February, they killed at least 30 people in Auno, Borno. On 15 March they attacked a military post in Toumour, injuring a soldier; 50 insurgents were killed.

On 23 March, they carried out massacres against the Chadian and Nigerian armies. Chad President Idriss Déby said it was the worst attack its military had ever suffered. Chad Defense Minister Mahamat Abali Salah announced on 31 March the launch of "Operation Boma's Wrath" in response to the massacres. The operation's target was to wipe out the Boko Haram remnants around Lake Chad.

On 9 June, Boko Haram killed 81 villagers in a mass shooting in Gubio, Borno. On 13 June, Boko Haram killed at least 20 soldiers in Monguno and more than 40 civilians in Nganzai. On 29 July, the convoy of the Borno Governor Babagana Zulum was attacked by Boko Haram. Five people were killed in fighting, including three policemen. The governor was not hurt. On 2 August, Boko Haram killed at least 18 people in a grenade attack on an IDP camp in Far North, Cameroon. On 9 August, ISWAP killed six French aid workers and two Nigerien civilians in Kouré, Niger. On 19 August, ISWAP took hundreds of people hostage in Borno.

On 6 September, Boko Haram raided a village of Kurmari, where they killed four civilians in their sleep. They also raided two villages at outskirts of Maiduguri; six civilians were killed in this raid. Nigerian military carried out an operation against Boko Haram in Gwoza. Five insurgents were killed and seven hostages were rescued; several insurgents were wounded but managed to escape. On 17 September, Boko Haram raided a village in Lake Chad region in Chad; several civilians were abducted. On 18 September, Nigerian military carried out an air operation against Boko Haram in Kassa Kura in Maiduguri. Sixteen insurgents were killed, 38 were arrested, and their ammunition was seized. Several insurgents escaped with wounds. On 19 September, Chadian military attacked Boko Haram in the village of Barkalam near the border with Nigeria; 15 Boko Haram fighters were killed in the fighting, and 12 hostages were rescued.

Boko Haram and Chadian military later clashed at Bilabrim where five insurgents were killed and two Chadian soldiers were wounded. On 20 September, Boko Haram ambushed a military convoy, killing 3 soldiers and fatally wounding Colonel Dahiru Bako. On 25 September, Boko Haram ambushed a military convoy accompanying government officials near Monguno, killing 15: eight policemen, three soldiers, and four Civilian Joint Task Force members.

On 26 September, Zulum and his convoy were attacked by Boko Haram near Baga. Zulum was unhurt but 30 people were killed in the attack; twelve policemen, five soldiers, four members of a government-backed militia and nine civilians. Many others were injured. On 27 September, Islamic State militants attacked a convoy in Borno, killing 18 people. On 29 September, Zulum's convoy noticed a donkey on the road and shot at it. After the donkey exploded, insurgents who planted a bomb on it came out of hiding and fired at them. Several of Boko Haram insurgents were killed in the following shootout, while no one from Zulum's convoy was injured or killed. Vehicles of the convoy sustained bullet damage.

On 1 November, Boko Haram raided Takulashi village near Chibok; they came from Sambisa Forest. Anti-jihadist militia from Chibok mobilised in two trucks and attempted to defend the village but were outnumbered by insurgents who managed to seize one of their trucks. Twelve people were killed and seven civilians abducted. On 9 November, Nigerian military carried out two operations against Boko Haram. In the village of Buni Gari 5 Boko Haram insurgents were killed and several others were injured. Nigerian military also rescued four hostages. On 21 November, Boko Haram ambushed a Nigerian military convoy between Jagiran and Monguno. Six soldiers were killed and 26 were injured, and several soldiers were missing.

On 22 November, Zulum's convoy was attacked while he was traveling to meet with government officials in Baga. Seven soldiers and two civilians were killed in this ambush, but the governor was unhurt. On 26 November, Boko Haram staged an attack on mainly Christian village of Gabass in Far North, Cameroon. Three civilians were killed and one was kidnapped. Boko Haram also attacked village of Guidi also in Far North region where they set five homes ablaze. On 28 November, Boko Haram massacred about 110 farmers in Koshebe, Borno.

On 11 December, Boko Haram abducted more than 330 secondary school students in Kankara, Katsina State. On 12 December, around 70 Boko Haram militants attacked Toumour in Niger. At least 27 people were killed, and several others are missing or wounded. During the attack between 800 and 1,000 houses, the central market and various vehicles were burnt down. According to a local elected official nearly 60% of the village was destroyed by the attack which lasted 3 hours.

On 24 December, Boko Haram attacked the Christian village of Pemi in Borno. The attackers burnt 10 homes and looted food supplies that were meant to be distributed to residents to celebrate Christmas; they also took medical supplies from the village. Security officials warned that an attack on a Christian holiday is likely, so many residents managed to escape the attack. Nevertheless 11 civilians were killed including a Christian priest.

On 25 December Boko Haram kidnapped around 40 loggers in Wulgo forest; three loggers were killed while trying to escape. Loggers from the village of Shehuri in Borno went to the forest but they did not return in the evening as they usually do. The next day local anti-jihadist militia leader mobilised a search party which went deep into the forest and recovered three bodies. On 26 December, Boko Haram raided the villages of Shafa, Azare, and Tashan Alade in Borno. Ten people were killed during the raids, seven of them being civilians, two policemen, and one CJTF militiaman. Houses, shops, churches and one police station were burnt down during the raids. On 28 December, A landmine planted by Boko Haram in Larothe Gomani village killed four Nigerian soldiers. On 29 December, seven hunters were killed and nine injured after their vehicle hit a landmine planted by Boko Haram near the village of Kayamla. They were recruited by the government to help fight against the jihadist groups, and when their vehicle hit a landmine they were pursuing Boko Haram insurgents.

=== 2021 ===
On 3 January 2021, Multinational Joint Task Force (MNJTF) carried a sweep around Kolofata. During the fighting three Boko Haram insurgents were killed and two captured. Operation Tuka Takaibango was announced by Nigeria's military in early January. On 4 January, at around 4 am three members of a local vigilance committee were shot dead by Boko Haram in Mayo Moskota area. A civilian was killed by Boko Haram in Kolofata area the same morning.

On 6 January, Boko Haram infiltrated Geidam, Yobe. Insurgents were sighted at outskirts of Geidam at 1 pm. A rumour about insurgents spread through town soon and it caused regular activities to be disrupted for an hour and a half, after nothing happened people continued with their regular activities. Boko Haram insurgents gathered at strategic locations such as Geidam market with a coordinated plan at 5:30 pm, soon after they positioned at those locations they attacked the town. The insurgents abducted the District Head, injured several civilians and stole food and medical supplies. Police of the district later found two bodies in a burnt vehicle who they believe are members of Boko Haram.

On 7 January, Operation Tuka Takaibango was officially launched. On 8 January, Boko Haram attacked village of Mozogo in Cameroon, many civilians tried to escape into a nearby forest. A female suicide bomber detonated herself during the attack, killing at least 14 civilians eight of those being children. On 9 January, At least 28 Boko Haram insurgents were killed during clashes with Nigerian Army in Gujba, while several other insurgents escaped, one Nigerian soldier was killed and one was injured, according to a military spokesman of Nigeria. On 11 January, ISWAP ambushed Nigerian military convoy in Gazagana village, killing 13 and injuring several others. On 13 January, an ISWAP suicide bomber killed six Nigerian soldiers as they conducted a raid in the village of Talala, Borno.

On 14 January, ISWAP militants attacked Garin Gada village in Yobe, killing at least two civilians, whilst also raiding and looting food from the village. On 17 January, seven IEDs were activated against a Nigerian Army convoy of APCs and other vehicles, escorted by a foot patrol in Gorgi, Borno. Over 30 soldiers were killed. Three vehicles were destroyed, and an armored vehicle, weapons and ammunition were seized. On 18 January, ISWAP operatives exchanged fire and activated several IEDs against Nigerian soldiers in Matari, about 50 km west of Maiduguri. At least 20 soldiers were killed. Two ATVs were destroyed. In addition, two ATVs, an APC, weapons and ammunition were seized. On 22 January, ISWAP operatives ambushed and fired machine guns at a Nigerian Army patrol in Borno. Seven soldiers were killed and others were wounded. In addition, an ATV, weapons and ammunition were seized. On 31 January, two attacks took place in northern Nigeria. One in the village of Chabal, leaving two policemen dead and two abducted. The second attack occurred in Dikwa, resulting in the deaths of 2 soldiers and leaving two female police officers abducted.

February saw increased action with government forces. On 5 February, it was reported that Nigerian troops backed by jets overran several camps of Boko Haram in the Timbuktu triangle, including the Dole camp. They also liberated Talala, which was seized in 2013 by militants and became their second largest camp. Besides Talala they also liberated Buk, Gorgi and overran camps in Kidari, Argude, Takwala, Chowalta and Galdekore. Two high-profile ISWAP commanders, Modu Sulum and Ameer Modu Borzogo, fled along with some fighters during intense fighting, but several other commanders and fighters were killed, and many hostages were rescued.

On 5 February, ISWAP operatives ambushed Nigerian soldiers in the Goniri region, near the Niger-Nigeria border. The two sides exchanged fire. Six soldiers were killed and a few others were wounded. The other soldiers fled. ISIS operatives seized vehicles, weapons and ammunition. On 7 February, bandits raided two villages in northwest Kaduna State, leading to the deaths of 19 people. On 8 February, ISWAP operatives attacked a Nigerian Army checkpoint in Monguno, about 70 km from the Nigeria-Chad-Cameroon tri-border area. There was an exchange of fire. Three soldiers were killed, and several others were wounded. ISWAP operatives seized vehicles, weapons and ammunition.

On 9 February, a group of Nigerian soldiers was attacked between Jakana and Mainok, about 30 km west of Maiduguri. There was an exchange of fire. Seven soldiers were killed. In addition, two Nigerian Army vehicles were destroyed. ISWAP operatives seized weapons left at the site. On February 9, a Nigerian Army checkpoint was attacked in Geidam. The sides exchanged fire. Four soldiers were killed, three were taken prisoner and the rest fled. ISWAP operatives seized weapons left at the site and set fire to a Nigerian army vehicle. On 11 February, Nigerian soldiers were ambushed in the suburbs of Monguno. An IED was activated against the soldiers, followed by an exchange of fire. Three soldiers were killed and several others were wounded. The rest fled. ISWAP operatives seized an ATV and weapons.

On 12 February, a force of a militia supporting the Nigerian Army was attacked in the village of Gur, about 150 km south of Maiduguri. There was an exchange of fire. Four militia fighters were killed. The ISWAP operatives set fire to four vehicles and houses belonging to the fighters. On 15 February, a Nigerian Army compound was attacked in Marte, Borno, about 40 km east of the Nigeria-Cameroon border. Ten soldiers were killed in the exchange of fire and several others were wounded. The other soldiers fled. ISIS operatives set fire to the compound, two tanks and a Nigerian army vehicle. They also seized three vehicles, weapons and ammunition.

The second half of February was similarly violent. On 16 February, a group of Nigerian soldiers was attacked in a village in Borno. There was an exchange of fire. Four soldiers were killed and several others were wounded. The other soldiers fled. ISIS operatives seized weapons and ammunition. Four policemen and seven civilians were killed during an ISWAP attack on Bayamari, Yobe. An attack was carried out against the headquarters of a militia supporting the Nigerian Army in Gubio, Borno. There was an exchange of fire. Three soldiers were killed and several others were wounded. The other soldiers fled. ISWAP operatives seized weapons and ammunition and set fire to vehicles.

On 17 February, a Nigerian Army convoy was ambushed and targeted by gunfire in the Karito region, near Lake Chad. Three soldiers were killed and several others were wounded in the exchange of fire. ISWAP operatives seized weapons and ammunition, and set fire to three vehicles. On 19 February, an attack was carried out against a Nigerian Army camp in Dikwa, about 50 km from the Nigeria-Cameroon border in Borno State. A total of 15 soldiers were killed in the exchange of fire and several others were wounded. The remaining soldiers fled, and ISWAP operatives seized four vehicles, weapons and ammunition. ISIS operatives set fire to the camp and to other vehicles. The camp taken over by ISWAP operatives is one of the largest Nigerian Army camps and many residents left the area in the wake of the attack. On 21 February, Boko Haram militants beheaded five people in an IDP camp in Borno. On 23 February, Boko Haram militants stormed Maiduguri, killing at least 10 people, firing rocket-propelled grenades in the city. This is the first attack of its kind there in years. On 25 February, gunmen on motorcycles stormed into several villages in Igabi and Chikun districts of Kaduna State, leaving at least 18 people dead. On 26 February, a midnight attack on a secondary school in Zamfara resulted in at least 279 schoolgirls being kidnapped. On 28 February, ISWAP ambushed the convoy of the commandant of Nigeria's counterinsurgency operation, Farouq Yahaya, killing at least two soldiers.

On 1 March, ISWAP took over the town of Dikwa for several hours after forcing government forces out of the settlement. Whilst in Dikwa, the militants attacked a Nigerian Army base killing six soldiers. The men returned the next day killing another two soldiers. ISWAP took over the town of Bukarti, Yobe. ISWAP militants also attacked a Nigerian Army convoy near Geidam, Yobe. The attack left two Nigerian soldiers dead. On 6 March, Boko Haram invaded Rumirgo community of Askira Uba local government area of Borno, killing two civilians and a security personnel and stole a tanker vehicle loaded with petrol. On 25 April, 31 Nigerian soldiers were killed in Mainok, Borno. On 19–20 May, ISWAP attacked and overran Boko Haram militants in the Sambisa Forest and eventually captured the forest. Shekau was killed during the fighting, reportedly using a suicide vest. The remaining Boko Haram loyalists rallied under Sahalaba who declared that they were not yet defeated.

On 24 June, the United Nations Development Program released a report saying that the insurgency in Nigeria, as of the end of 2020, had killed around 350,000 people, by direct and indirect means. On 4 July, ISWAP named new commanders and governors, including personnel in charge of taxation. On 29 October it was reported that Nigeria's army it had killed the new leader of ISWAP, Malam Bako, in a military operation, two weeks after announcing the death of the group's former head al-Barnawi. On 6 November, non-IS sources claimed that ISWAP had elected Sani Shuwaram as the new leading commander. On 13 November, Nigerian Army Brigadier General Dzarma Zirkusu and three other Nigerian soldiers were killed in an ISWAP attack on Askira town in Borno State. On 30 December, the MNJTF announced that six troops from Nigeria and Niger were killed and 16 wounded by ISWAP militants during an operation in December 2021 in Borno State. In the same operation, 22 militants were killed and 17 captured.

=== 2022 ===
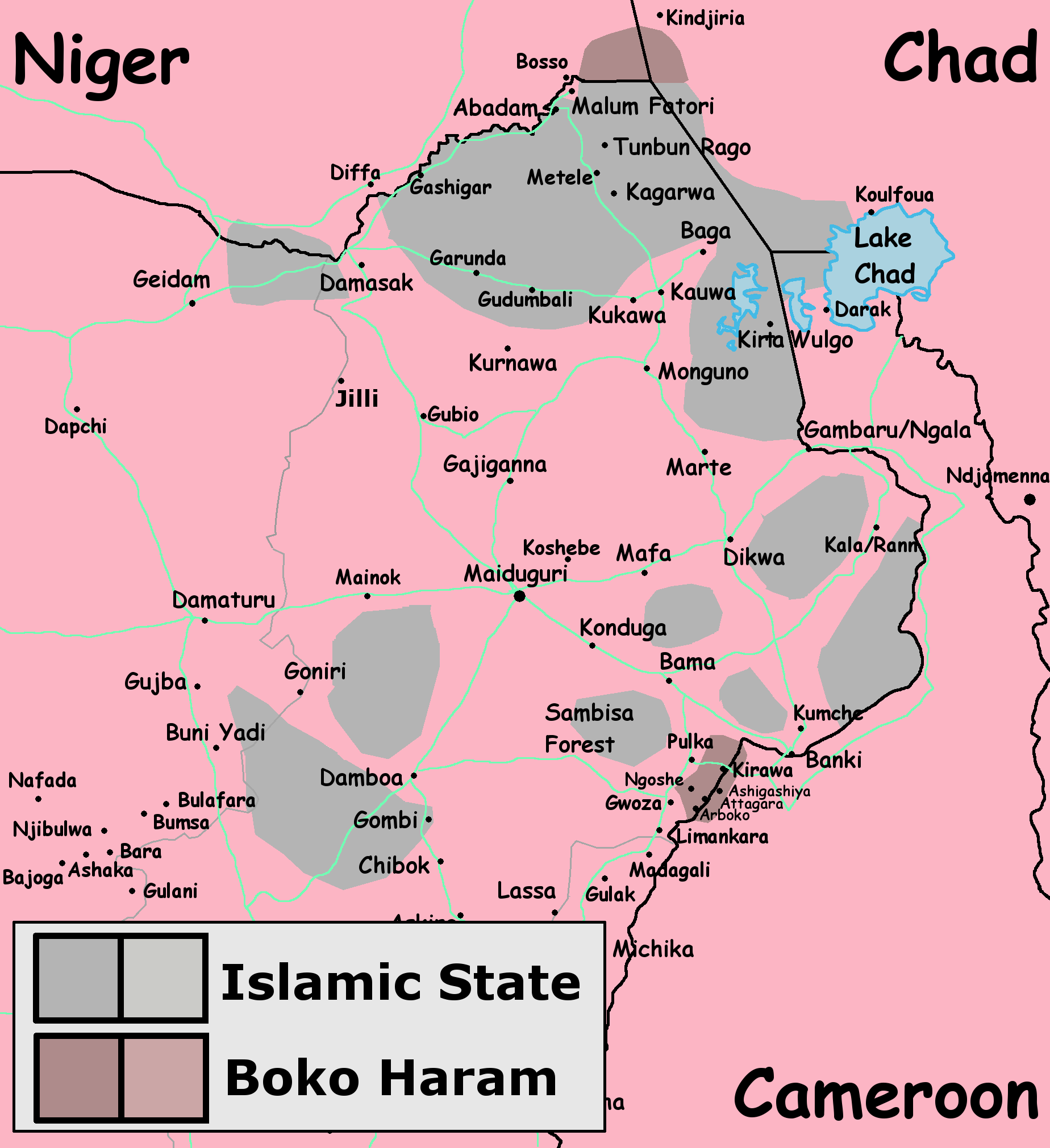
Areas with presence of Boko haram and ISWAP in 2022

2022 saw gains for Nigerian forces, including capturing or killing several top leaders. Spring saw Nigerian forces kill a succession of insurgent leaders. On 18 February it was reported that Nigerian aircraft eliminated some terrorist kingpins including ISWAP Commander Mallam Buba Danfulani during a raid on Boko Haram/ISWAP strongholds around the Tumbuns area in Lake Chad and Sambisa Forests surroundings. Five other commanders by the names of: Musa Amir Jaish, Mahd Maluma, Abu-Ubaida, Abu-Hamza and Abu-Nura umarun Leni were also killed. On 16 March the leader of Jamā’at Ahl as-Sunnah lid-Da’wah wa’l-Jihād, a Boko Haram splinter group, Alhaji Ari-Difinoma, surrendered to troops.

On March 20 the new leader of ISWAP, Sani Shuwaram, and other terrorists were killed in airstrikes. On 9 April ISWAP commander Abubakar Dan-Buduma and other terrorists were killed in Operations by the MNJTF. On May 14 it was reported that MNJTF airstrikes killed two prominent ISWAP leaders, Bako Gorgore and Aba-Ibrahim in Lake Chad. On May 15 it was reported that Boko Haram commander Abubakar Sarki and several terrorists were killed during a clash with the Nigerian army in the Sambisa Forest. On May 23 Boko Haram fighters killed around 40 farmers. On May 30 MNJTF troops alongside Operation HADIN KAI stormed the general area of Tumbun Rago, Tumbun Dilla and Jamina settlements and succeeded in eliminating over 25 terrorists. The troops also recovered one AK-47 rifle, one anti-aircraft gun, and hundreds of assorted ammunition.

In June, a group of hunters ambushed and killed a Boko Haram commander and his deputy while wounding several of their escaping fighters. On 1 June a rivalry clash between ISWAP and the Jamā’at Ahl as-Sunnah lid-Da’wah wa’l-Jihād led to the killing of a commander and scores of his fighters. On 5 June members of the ISWAP attacked St Francis Xavier Catholic Church in Owo killing at least 50 parishioners and injuring 87. On 7 June it was reported that the MNJTF killed 805 jihadis on Lake Chad's islands and neighboring areas.

August saw further successes against insurgents. On 3 August it was reported that military airstrikes killed Boko Haram commander Alhaji Modu and 27 other terrorists on Mandara Mountain. On 6 August Abdulkarim Faca-Faca, who was among the masterminds of the attack on President Muhammadu Buhari's advance convoy to Katsina, was killed along with eight of his gang members by air strikes. On 10 August it was reported that bombardments by two Nigerian Air Force fighter jets had killed many terrorists, among them leader Alhaji Shanono, operating in Kaduna State. According to a military source, the terrorists were caught off guard during a battle between ISWAP and Boko Haram. On 16 August the Chadian army killed 10 Boko Haram terrorists during clashes around Bol in the Lake Chad area. On 23 August the Nigerian Air Force bombarded the enclave of an ISWAP leader Fiya Ba Yuram in the Sambisa Forest. The airstrikes hit some specific targets in the Tunbuns and Sambisa, killing scores of terrorists hiding in the enclaves. On 26 August terrorist commander Uzaifa was killed in an air raid on criminal enclaves in Sambisa Forest and the Tumbuns. Between 30 and 31 August Nigerian fighter jets killed 49 Boko Haram fighters in separate camps.

On 1 September, 70 suspected Boko Haram members drowned in a river while trying to escape air bombardment in Sheruri, Borno. On 5 September Nigerian troops and aircraft killed 200 Boko Haram terrorists including five commanders by the names of Abou Hauwa, Amir Shettima, Akura Buri, Abou Zainab and Abou Idris. On 12 September top Boko Haram commander and chief executioner Bashir Bulabuduwaye surrendered to the Nigerian army. On 23 November dozens of soldiers were killed near Lake Chad.

=== 2023 ===
2023 was relatively quiet, seeing limited insurgent activity. On 28 March Boko Haram's chief bomb maker, Awana Gaidam, was killed by his own IED. On 18 September a group of terrorists held peace talks with people from Fankama, Katsina. Two attacks on 30 and 31 October in Geidam killed at least 37 people. The first attack was a shooting that killed 17. The second attack was executed with a land mine, which killed at least 20 people attending the burials of the victims of the shooting. On 1 and 3 November, in Operation Hadarin Daji, the Nigerian Air Force carried out numerous airstrikes against Boko Haram hideouts, destroying two bases and killing several terrorists.

=== 2024 ===
In the beginning of 2024, the Islamic State announced the beginning of a campaign called "kill them wherever you find them". This campaign lasted from 1 to 10 January and saw a rise of attacks claimed by ISWAP. On 3 February ISWAP killed 4 policemen at Nganzai, Borno. A security spokesperson who witnessed the massacre commented "Some of the police officers were also lucky to have survived the onslaught of the terror attack, but the unfortunate four officers paid the supreme price while on active duty". The terrorists left the area before the Nigerian military could arrive.

On 29 June at least 32 people were killed in attacks thought to have been carried out by female suicide bombers in Gwoza. On 31 July at least 19 people were killed in a suicide attack by Boko Haram at a market in Konduga. On 22 August suspected Boko Haram gunmen killed 13 farmers in Shirore.

Open Doors estimates that 4,118 Christians were killed for their faith in Nigeria in 2024, the highest number globally.

=== 2025 ===
On 21 June 2025, a suspected female suicide bomber killed at least 12 people and injured 30 others at a Friday night fish market in Borno State. On 5 September 63 people were killed, including seven soldiers, and others were reported missing in attacks by Boko Haram in Darul Jamal, Borno. In October 2025, Boko Haram seized Kirawa, Borno, burning the district head's palace, a military barracks and dozens of homes and forcing more than 5,000 people to flee into Cameroon. Residents described Kirawa as deserted and under insurgent control, an attack that followed recent overruns of army positions in the region and prompted calls for urgent military reinforcements.

Between 5 and 8 November Boko Haram fighters launched a naval invasion against ISWAP bases across the various islands in Lake Chad. The attacks were led by Hassan Buduma and Mohd Hassan. Clashes left at least 4 Boko Haram attackers dead and 200 ISWAP members killed.

On 25 December the United States carried out a strike against ISWAP. The U.S. strike was the first direct foreign military intervention in the insurgency.

=== 2026 ===
On 3 February 2026, gunmen of the IS-affiliated militant group Lakurawa attacked the villages of Nuku and Woro in Kwara State after residents rejected their demands to embrace sharia. A least 162 residents were killed, and several buildings were burned. On 5 May Boko Haram militants attacked a Chadian military post on Barka Tolorom island, killing 23 and injuring 26.

On 15 May Trump announced that U.S. and Nigerian forces eliminated ISWAP second-in-command Abu-Bilal al-Minuki during a joint mission. On 3 July, the U.S. withdrew most of its deployed forces while continuing to provide intelligence support to Nigeria at the request of its government.

In September 2026, Boko Haram allegedly entered into a secret three month ceasefire agreement with the Nigerian government in exchange for the release of captives from Ngoshe. A Boko Haram sharia judge denied the ceasefire, stating they were fabrications for the upcoming Nigerian elections. Violence from Boko Haram has decreased in Nigeria since the alleged ceasefire but increased in Cameroon.

== Other issues ==
=== Possible causes ===
Northern Nigeria was made up of Sahelian states distinguished by a deep-rooted Islamic tradition that had shaped their cultural and political identity for centuries. These were feudal and conservative, with rigid caste and class systems and large slave populations. Furthermore, the north failed until 1936 to outlaw slavery. Possibly due to geographical factors, many (but not necessarily all) southern tribes, particularly those on the coast, had made contact with Europeans—unlike the north, which was engaged mainly with the Arab world and not Europe. Due to the system of indirect rule, the British were happy to pursue a limited course of engagement with the emirs.

While traditionalist elites in the north remained wary of Western education, their southern counterparts frequently embraced it—often sending their sons overseas to study. In time, a considerable developmental and educational gap grew between the south and the north. Even in 2014, northern states lagged behind in literacy, school attendance and educational achievement.

Chris Kwaja, a Nigerian university lecturer and researcher, asserts "religious dimensions of the conflict have been misconstrued as the primary driver of violence when, in fact, disenfranchisement and inequality are the root causes". Nigeria, he points out, has laws giving regional political leaders the power to qualify people as 'indigenes' (original inhabitants) or not. It determines whether citizens can participate in politics, own land, obtain a job, or attend school. The system is abused widely to ensure political support and to exclude others. Muslims have often been denied indigene certificates disproportionately. Nigerian opposition leader Buba Galadima said in 2012: "What is really a group engaged in class warfare is being portrayed in government propaganda as terrorists in order to win counter-terrorism assistance from the West."

=== Human rights ===
The conflict has seen numerous human rights abuses conducted by the Nigerian security forces in an effort to control the violence, as well as their encouragement of the formation of numerous vigilante groups (for example, the Civilian Joint Task Force). Amnesty International accused the Nigerian government of human rights abuses after 950 suspected Boko Harām militants died in detention facilities run by Nigeria's military Joint Task Force in 2013. In 2016 Amnesty International reported at least 8,000 detainees had died in detention facilities operated by the security services. Furthermore, the Nigerian government has been accused of incompetence and supplying misinformation about events in more remote areas.

Boko Haram has kidnapped large numbers of children on several occasions. This has led to Boko Haram members physically, psychologically and sexually abusing them, using and selling them as sex slaves and/or brides of forced marriages with their fighters, for example the Chibok kidnapping in 2014. In addition to kidnapping child brides, Human Rights Watch states that Boko Haram uses child soldiers. According to an anonymous source working on peace talks with the group, up to 40 percent of the fighters in the group are underage soldiers. The group has forcibly converted non-Muslims to Islam and is also known to assign non-Kanuris on suicide missions.

=== Response ===
Since the mid-2010s, the Nigerian government has constructed earthen berms and trenches around cities in northeastern Nigeria to restrict the movement of jihadist groups.

=== Rehabilitation of insurgents ===
Victims and affected communities accuse the Nigerian government of prioritising perpetrators over survivors as several groups of captured insurgents have gone through the government's deradicalization, reorientation and reintegration program. For example in March and April 2025 respectively, 600 and 390 "repentant Boko Haram members" publicly graduated after undergoing a 6–12-month process including vocational training upon which they received cash and startup equipment for the trade of their choice. Some have even been recruited into the security services. Meanwhile, no solid long term evaluation of the effectiveness of these problems are available.

There is doubt in the sincerity of the former insurgents and fears of them acting as spies or reverting to militancy, especially if they again become disgruntled, disaffected or ostracized. This remains a major problem faced by local governments as the ex-militants are generally suspected by officials and civilians to still hold connections to the rebels and pose a security risk. As a result, ex-rebels are often ostracized by the community, which in turn increases the risk of them rejoining the insurgency.

=== Cholera outbreak ===
In June 2024, the Nigeria Centre for Disease Control announced a total of 1,141 suspected and 65 confirmed cases of cholera with 30 deaths from 96 local government areas in 30 states. At least 74 people were reported to have died following an outbreak of cholera in Borno State that began in May 2026.

== International context ==
The insurgence can be seen in the context of other conflicts nearby, for example in northern Mali. The Boko Harām leadership has international connections to Al-Qaeda in the Islamic Maghreb, Al-Shabaab, the Movement for Unity and Jihad in West Africa, Mokhtar Belmokhtar's factions, and other militant groups outside Nigeria. In 2014 Nigerian President Jonathan even went so far as calling Boko Harām "al-Qaeda in West Africa". By 2012, attacks by Nigerian Islamist militias on targets beyond Nigeria's borders were still limited, and should not be confused with the activities of other groups (for example, the responsibility of AQIM for most attacks in Niger). Despite this, there were concerns that conflict could spread to Nigeria's neighbours, especially Cameroon, where it existed at a relatively low level until 2014, subsequently escalating considerably. There are combatants from neighboring Chad and Niger.

On 17 May 2014, the presidents of Benin, Chad, Cameroon, Nigeria and Niger met for a summit in Paris and agreed to combat Boko Harām on a coordinated basis, sharing in particular surveillance and intelligence gathering. Jonathan and Chad President Idriss Deby declared total war on Boko Harām. Western nations, including Britain, France, Israel, and the United States, pledged support including technical expertise and training. The New York Times reported in March 2015 that hundreds of private military contractors from South Africa and other countries play a decisive role in Nigeria's military campaign, operating attack helicopters and armored personnel carriers and assisting in the planning of operations.

In December 2025, the U.S. Army carried out targeted strikes in Sokoto State.

== See also ==
- Christianity and Islam
- Christianity in Africa
- Islam in Africa
- Christianity in Nigeria
- Islam in Nigeria
- Islamic extremism in Northern Nigeria
- List of massacres in Nigeria
- Central African Republic Civil War
- Insurgency in the Maghreb (2002–present)
- War in the Sahel
- List of conflicts in Africa
- List of designated terrorist groups
- List of Islamist terrorist attacks
- List of ongoing armed conflicts
- Islam and violence
- Islamic fundamentalism
