= 2016 Dalori attack =

Terrorist incident in Nigeria

- Part of the Boko Haram insurgency
- Location: 11°45′36.11″N 13°15′55.87″E; Dalori, Borno state, Nigeria
- Date: 30 January 2016 (UTC+01:00)
- Attack type: Suicide bombing, arson, mass murder
- Weapons: Firebombs, suicide vests, small arms
- Deaths: ~86
- Injuries: 135+
- Perpetrator: Islamic State of Iraq and the Levant: Boko Haram

On 30 January 2016, Boko Haram militants entered the suburban town of Dalori, Borno state, Nigeria, located near Borno's capital city, Maiduguri. Approximately 86 people were killed and upwards of 135 more injured in the attack, which is believed to have been a reprisal against the Civilian Joint Task Force (CJTF) but also comes a week after the Multinational Joint Task Force (MNJTF) announced its transition into the "resettlement and rebuilding stage" in its operation to dismantle Boko Haram. It was Boko Haram's first major attack of 2016.

== Background ==
Boko Haram is a jihadist group which began an insurgency in Nigeria in 2009. In the mid-2010s, it intensified and spread to neighboring countries Cameroon, Chad and Niger. Since being driven out of many region in northeastern Nigeria around 2015, Boko Haram shifted to targeting civilians, which began to make up an increasing portion of attacks.

The MNJTF, which included Cameroon, Chad, Niger, Benin, and Nigeria at the time, reportedly had 8,700 regional troops around January of 2016. However, continued delays stopped any joint operations from occurring prior to the day of the attack. Niger has since withdrawn from the MNJTF, announcing their withdrawal 30 March 2025. Strained relations between Nigeria and Niger and passive participation of Chadian forces in the MNJTF has slowed operations. Operations continue in nearby Cameroon and Nigeria, particularly through the Nigerian Army's Operation Hadin Kai (OPHK), which has been primarily deployed in Borno State, Nigeria. Notably, OPHK killed one of Boko Haram's top commander, Abu Fatima, on 30 May 2025.

The CTJF is a civilian vigilante group, founded initially under the name Yan Gora or Kato da Gora in 2013, aimed at assisting the MNJTF in its operations against Boko Haram. Its main city in Maiduguri, and was born primarily from endangered civilians unsatisfied with the early, unproductive MNJTF operations. Over 500 CTJF militants have been absorbed into the Nigerian armed forces, and the group receives ₦352 million NGN annually from the Borno State Ministry of Justice. The effectiveness of the group has been question, particularly as it has committed numerous human rights violations.

=== Motives ===
According to Media Coordinator of Operation Lafiya Dole, later renamed to Operation Hadin Kai, Theater Command, Col. Mustapha Anka, speaking in Maiduguri, claimed the attack targeted members of the CJTF and innocent civilians.

== Attack ==
Militants, travelling in two Volkswagen Golf sedans and on motorcycles, and armed with machine guns, travelled through Yale to Dalori, entering through the rear of the village. Militants immediately opened indiscriminate fire at residents and set huts and other structure alight with firebombs.

The attack lasted for approximately four hours, during which militants burnt children alive. One survivor recalls having "heard the screams of children burning to death."

The Nigerian Army were initially unable to fight the militants, but eventually forced Boko Haram militants to retreat when reinforcements armed with heavier weaponry arrived. Reinforcements were alerted of the attack by a local vigilante group called Kondugua, which noticed the flames from burning buildings.

In response to the attack, many villagers immediately fled to the neighboring village of Gamori Kerkeri. Militants hunted down fleeing civilians. Three female suicide bombers attempted to enter the fleeing group, ultimately bound for a refugee camp near Maiduguri, which housed approximately 25,000 refugees, but were intercepted. All three detonated their explosives.

By the end of the attack, Dalori was effectively "razed to the ground."

== Response ==
Initial death tolls were hard to confirm as bodies brought to a nearby hospital morgue were burnt beyond recognition. Furthermore, local sources listed between 50-100 corpses being collected. Later credible estimates concluded that some 86 people were killed in the attack. 62 others were treated for burns at the State Specialist Hospital in Maiduguri. Large parts of Dalori village were destroyed in the attack. Many charred corpses and bullet wound-ridden bodies were found during recovery efforts.

Questions have been raised over how the militants were able to attack a settlement so close to army headquarters in Maiduguri, how they apparently drove unhindered past roads patrolled by soldiers and vigilantes, and how they were able to attack the village for several hours before the army intervened and drove them out.

=== International ===
==== Intergovernmental organizations ====
The United Nations Security Council (UNSC) condemned the "horrific terrorist attacks," expressing sympathy for the families and friends of individuals killed or injured in the attack as well as Nigerians generally. It commended the MNJTF, and in reminding that "any acts of terrorism are criminal and unjustifiable, regardless of their motivation, wherever and whenever, and by whomsoever committed," it stressed that all states should cooperate in bringing the perpetrators "to justice."

== See also ==
- List of terrorist incidents, January–June 2016
- List of terrorist incidents linked to ISIL
