= Deeper Life Bible Church shooting =

Nigerian church shooting in 2012

Deeper Life Church shooting
- Part of the Boko Haram insurgency
- Okene (Nigeria)
- Location: 7.6100°N 6.2730°E; Deeper Life Bible Church, Otite, Kogi State, Nigeria
- Date: 7 August 2012
- Target: Christian civilians
- Attack type: mass shooting
- Weapon: AK-47 assault rifles
- Deaths: 19
- No. of participants: 3

On 7 August 2012, a mass shooting occurred at Deeper Life, an evangelical Christian church near Okene in Nigeria's central Kogi State. Three unidentified gunmen killed 19 people, including the church's pastor. The following day, in an apparent reprisal killing, three gunmen on motorcycles killed two soldiers and a civilian outside a mosque in Okene.

== Background ==
Boko Haram, an Islamic terrorist group whose goal is to institute sharia law throughout Nigeria, has become more active and more skilled in carrying out attacks since clashes with security forces in 2009. Since then, it has claimed responsibility, or been blamed for, numerous attacks on Nigerian government and civilian. Most attacks have been in the primarily Muslim north of Nigeria, though the group's name has been used to claim other bombings, such as the attacks against the United Nations headquarters and the main police building in the capital city of Abuja. The group itself has since splintered, with some members allied to Al-Qaeda in the Islamic Maghreb and some expecting terms of agreement similar to southern Nigeria's MEND.

== Shootings ==
=== Church shooting ===
The attack took place on 7 August 2012, at the Deeper Life Bible Church in the town of Otite, which is on the outskirts of the city of Okene in Kogi State. Three men, armed with AK-47 assault rifles, entered the church as a Bible study session was about to begin. One of the men switched off the generator that provided lighting in the church. The other two men then fired into the darkness with their assault rifles. Fifteen people were killed outright and four more died later from their wounds.

No group claimed responsibility for the shooting. Although the Islamist group Boko Haram has attacked Christian churches before, the attack was further south than the group's usual area of operations.

=== Mosque shooting ===
On 8 August, three gunmen on motorcycles shot dead two soldiers outside a mosque in Okene. A civilian was also killed by crossfire. The soldiers were on patrol outside the mosque and were fired upon at the end of a prayer session.

== Reactions ==
As the attacks occurred around Okene, on the border between Nigeria's mostly Christian south and mostly Muslim north, they were described as "worrying" for religious tensions in Nigeria. Security forces were deployed to the area and national police chief Mohammed Abubakar ordered 24-hour surveillance on all churches and mosques in Kogi State's central area. Nigerian soldiers and police officers searched for the gunmen through the night following the shooting.

Idris Wada, the Governor of Kogi State, announced a dusk-to-dawn curfew in parts of the state. He said, "The perpetrators of the heinous crime are wicked, devilish, ungodly and deserve no place in a sane society. But they will not get away with it this time. We will spare no resource at our disposal to fish out the perpetrators and smoke terrorism out of our state." Wada also visited the Ohinoyi of the Ebira people to express displeasure at the situation in his territory.

== Investigation ==
Residents of the Okene area alleged that in the days following the shooting, police had conducted house-to-house searches, beating a number of civilians. Some citizens were reported to have fled the city. A police spokesman denied any violence had taken place. Several former politicians from the Okene area were brought to Lokoja for questioning related to the attacks.

On 9 August, police announced that they had arrested two men and one woman suspected of perpetrating the church shooting. The three were reportedly arrested following a gunfight with police in Ibillo, Edo State.

== See also ==
- June 2012 Kaduna church bombings
