= 2015 N'Djamena bombings =

Terrorist incident in Chad

- Location: N'Djamena, Chad
- Date: 15 June, 27 June, 11 July 2015
- Target: Police institutions, Market place
- Attack type: Improvised Explosive Devices
- Deaths: Total: 59: 15 June: 33; 27 June: 11; 11 July: 15
- Injuries: Total: 180+: 15 June: 100+; 27 June: unknown; 11 July: 80+

On three days immediately before and during Ramadan, 2015, four attacks struck Chad's capital N'Djamena. Three suicide attacks against two police targets killed 33 people on 15 June, five policemen and six terrorists were killed during a police raid on 27 Jun, and a suicide bomber killed 15 in N'Djamena's main market, on 11 July.

== Background ==
Chad, long affected by Boko Haram, intervened militarily by attacking insurgent-held towns in Northern Nigeria, in early 2015. The economic disruption caused by the lawlessness in Borno State and the Extrême-Nord of Cameroon had seriously affected the country. Thus Chad's and Niger's militaries, with the approval of their neighbour, made forays across their borders into Nigeria. Later in 2015, an agreement was made that Benin, Cameroon, Chad, Niger, and Nigeria would join in military coalition against the Boko Haram insurgency, under the Multinational Joint Task Force (MNJTF). In January 2015, the headquarters of the MNJTF in Baga had been overrun by Boko Haram, a rather ignominious moment for the Force. The sacking of the Headquarters in Baga preceded what has been referred to as the 2015 Baga massacre.

As part of the 2015 MNJTF agreement, Chad committed to hosting a new headquarters in N'Djamena. Nigerian president Muhammadu Buhari has held talks in N'Djamena about forming a new coalition with Benin of 8,700 troops. As a result of this Chad became an explicit target for Boko Haram. Threats were made in several videos in early 2015.

== Bombings ==
=== 15 June 2015 ===
The near simultaneous suicide bombings outside a police headquarters and police academy killed 33 people, and wounded over 100 others. The first, at the Police Headquarters, a motorcyclist blew himself up. The second, at the Police Academy, involved two attacks at the same location. Chad's government accused Boko Haram of the attack, which remained unclaimed until 8 July, when Boko Haram revealed its responsibility, under the name Islamic State's West Africa Province

=== 27 June 2015 ===
During a police raid, a result of the investigation into the bombings of 15 June, suspected terrorists detonated explosives, killing five policemen and six terrorists. Injuries were not reported. The police subsequently announced 60 arrests and the destruction of the cell that was responsible for the 15 June attacks.

=== 11 July 2015 ===
Around 08:30, a suicide bomber, believed to be a man dressed in a burqa, triggered his explosives when stopped for a security control at the south door of N'Djamena's main market. 15 were killed and at least 80 injured.

== Reaction ==
A spokesman for the Chad's government, Jean-Bernard Padaré, "They wanted to test us," Mr. Padaré said. "But it shows they are desperate. They thought it would hurt our morale, but it only confirms our will to eradicate them."

UN Secretary General Ban Ki-moon condemned the attacks and praised Chad "for its courageous role in the fight against Boko Haram".

Immediately after the 15 June attack, Chad's government banned the full face veil. In early August 2015, the parliament reinstated the death penalty for terrorism.

On 21 July 2015, Condé Nast published an article that suggested it was a good time to visit Chad, and said that the worst that might happen was "having [one's] wallet stolen in N'Djamena's market". The article was retracted soon after.

== See also ==
- 2015 West African offensive
- 2015 Baga massacre
- Multinational Joint Task Force
