= December 2012 shootings in Northern Nigeria =

Christamas day mass shooting in Maiduguri and Potiskum churches in Nigeria

- Part of the Boko Haram insurgency
- December 2012 shootings in Northern Nigeria (Nigeria)
- Location: (Nigeria) Maiduguri and Potiskum
- Date: 25, 28 December 2012 (UTC+01:00)
- Target: Nigerian Christians
- Attack type: Spree shootings, arson
- Deaths: 27

Two shootings in Nigeria occurred on Christmas Day church services in northern Nigeria on 25 December 2012, at churches in Maiduguri and Potiskum. At least twelve casualties were reported. Terror organisation Boko Haram claimed not to be responsible, however is suspected to be.

In the city of Potiskum, Yobe, in the north east of the country armed men shot at least 6 church-goers. Afterwards the church was set in fire. In Maiduguri as well 6 church-goers were killed, including the priest of the church.

Three days later, on 28 December, in the village of Musari another fifteen Christians were killed. Attackers invaded the village and cut their throats while asleep. The victims included a traffic police officer and fourteen civilians.

== See also ==
- December 2011 Northern Nigeria attacks
- April 2012 Kaduna bombings
