= Dalori =

Dalori is a suburban town near Maiduguri, Borno, northeastern Nigeria. Since March 2015, it hosts one of the largest internally displaced persons camp created during the Boko Haram insurgency, with more than 15,000 people, most of them coming from the southeast of Borno State. Dalori camp is located on the road from Maiduguri to Konduga, Bama and the border between Nigeria and Cameroon, 15 kilometers southeast of Maiduguri.

The camp has been targeted by many attacks from Boko Haram, including suicide attacks. The worst of these attacks occurred on 30 January 2016, when at least 86 people were killed and at least 62 injured.
