= Ibrahim Sallau Ali =

Nigerian Major General and Force Commander

Major general Ibrahim Sallau Ali
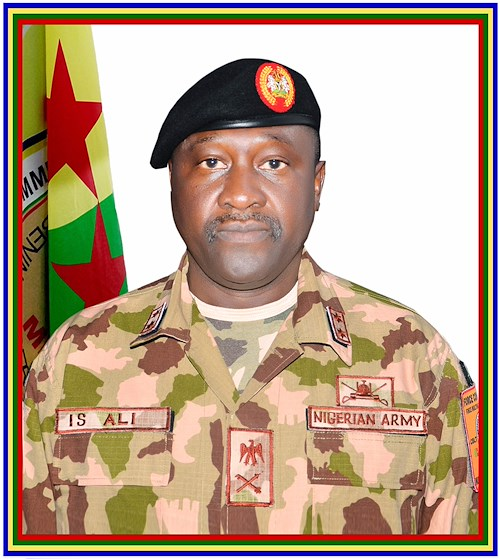

Force Commander Multinational Joint Task Force N'Djamena
- Incumbent
- Assumed office 14 July 2023 - 20 January 2025
- Preceded by: Major General Gold Chubuisi
- Succeeded by: Major General Godwin Mutkut

Theatre Commander Joint Task Force, Operation HADIN KAI
- In office 28 Jan 2023 – 14 July 2023
- Preceded by: Major General Christopher Gwabin Musa

Personal details
- Born: 16 November 1970 (age 55)
- Education: Nigerian Defence Academy; Royal Military Academy, Sandhurst

Military service
- Allegiance: Nigeria
- Branch/service: Nigerian Army
- Years of service: 1992–2025
- Rank: Major general
- Commands: Multinational Joint Task Force
- Battles/wars: Boko Haram Insurgency War; Conflict in the Lake Chad; Operation LIBERTY in Liberia; Operation SAND STORM/TIGER TAIL in Sierra Leone; Operation BOYONA; Operation Restore Order 3 Operation Zaman Lafiya; Operation Lafiya Dole; Operation Lake Sanity 2

Ibrahim Sallau Ali is a major general officer in the Nigerian Army and formerly the Force Commander of the Multinational Joint Task Force in N'Djamena. He assumed this position after serving as the Theatre Commander of the Joint Task Force in North East Operation Hadin Kai.

== Early life ==
Ali was born on 16 November 1970 in Nasarawa Kano State, Nigeria, to Alhaji Sallau Ali and Hajiya Aishatu Ibrahim. He is from Municipal Local Government Area of Kano State. He began his education in 1974, at Lebanon Primary School Kano, and then attended Saint Thomas Secondary School in 1980, also in Kano State. In 1986, he enrolled at Kaduna Polytechnic in Kaduna State, to study town planning.

== Education and military career ==
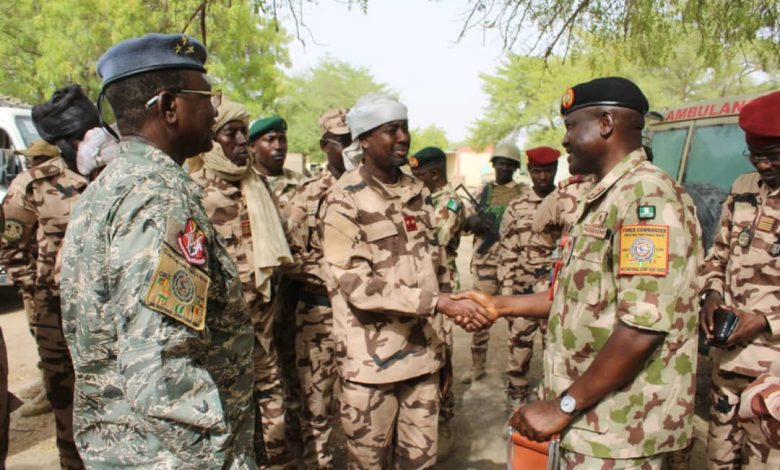

Ali entered the Nigerian Defence Academy in 1987 as a member of the 39th Regular Course. In 1991, he earned a Bachelor of Science degree in Geography. He was nominated in 1992 to complete his cadet training at the Royal Military Academy, Sandhurst, in the United Kingdom, where he was awarded the Silver Bugle for outstanding athleticism among all British and foreign cadets. He was commissioned as a second lieutenant into the Nigerian Army Armoured Corps in April 1993. In addition to his Bachelor of Science Degree in Geography, he holds a Master of Arts Degree in International Relations from the University of Ghana.

Ali has held various key appointments, including:

- General Officer Commanding 3 Division/Operation Safe Haven
- Theatre Commander Joint Task Force (North East) Operation Hadin Kai
- Currently, Major General Ali is the Force Commander Multinational Joint Task Force N'Djamena.

== Operational experience ==
Ali's experience includes participation in Operation Liberty in Liberia from 1994 to 1998 and Operation Sandstorm/Tiger Tail in Sierra Leone in 1997, where he was wounded in action. He was also part of Operation Flush Out 1 with the Multinational Joint Task Force in Baga Borno State from 1998 to 2000. He was wounded in action once again during Operation Restore Order III, Boyona, Zaman Lafiya and Lafiya Dole in Yobe State. He also participated in Operation Hadin Kai in Maiduguri and Operation Safe Haven in Jos. Currently, he is serving in the MNJTF and leading a campaign to eradicate all terrorists from the Lake Chad basin, ensuring the safety and security of the region.

== Honours and awards ==
- Pass Staff Course Dagger Dagger (++).
- Two Purple Heart Awards.
- Foreign Training Military Assistance.
- Grand Service Staff.
- Fellow National Defence College.
- Command Medal, Field Command Medal, Field Command Medal of Honour.
- Nigerian Army Innovation and Invention Medal.
- Officer of the National Order of Chad.

== Personal life ==
He is married to Mrs Hauwa Sa'id Muhammad and have children. His hobbies include reading, watching films, playing golf and reflecting about life.
