= Madalla =

- Town
- Location in Nigeria
- Coordinates: 9.104°N 7.215°E
- Country: Nigeria
- Territory: Federal Capital Territory

MadAllah is a town in Nigeria near the capital Abuja. It is in between Suleja and Abuja and mostly referred to as Abuja.

Madalla has some areas of attention like the surrounding rocky hills and mountains all over the town. It is a rural-urban Settlement with a population of about 80,000 individuals.

== Attacks ==
In September 2011 five Igbo businessmen were shot dead by two men in an apparent sectarian attack.

It was the site of the December 2011 Christmas Day bombing that took place at the St. Theresa Catholic Church where a terrorist sect known as Boko Haram attacked.

Madalla also houses the Zuma Rock at the outskirts of the city.
