= Baga Sola bombings =

2015 terrorist incident in Chad

2015 Chad suicide bombings
- Part of the Boko Haram insurgency
- Baga Sola bombings (Chad)
- Location: Baga Sola, Lac Region, Chad
- Date: 10 October 2015
- Target: Marketplace and refugee camp
- Attack type: Suicide bombing, mass murder
- Weapon: Explosives
- Deaths: 38
- Injuries: 51
- Perpetrators: Islamic State of Iraq and the Levant, Boko Haram
- Motive: Islamic extremism

The 2015 Chad suicide bombings were a suicide attack which occurred the afternoon of Saturday 10, October 2015 in the town of Baga Sola, Chad, a small fishing community on Lake Chad. The attack was allegedly perpetrated by the Nigeria-based Islamic extremist group Boko Haram and resulted in the deaths of around 36 individuals, and wounded upwards of 50 more. The attacks were reportedly carried out by two women, two children, and a man with the intended targets being a busy marketplace, and a nearby refugee camp hosting tens of thousands of Nigerians. It was the deadliest attack to take place in the Lake Chad region.

== Background ==
=== Boko Haram ===
Boko Haram is a Salafist jihadi Islamic extremist organization with origins in the West African country of Nigeria. The group's primary goal is the takeover of the Nigerian government in order to establish a theocracy under strict Islamic law. While Boko Haram participate in a wide range of terrorist activities including suicide bombings, and massacres, the group is widely known for the kidnapping of women and young girls, most notably the Chibok kidnappings. Due to an ever-increasing amount of activity in and outside the borders of Nigeria, Boko Haram was officially designated as an international terrorist organization by the United States. In 2015, Boko Haram declared its allegiance to the Islamic State in Iraq and the Levant. The group was accepted as a member of the wider caliphate by official decree of the Caliph Abu Bakr al-Baghdadi.

==== Use of women and children in suicide attacks ====
Boko Haram in recent years has increasingly begun to use women and children as suicide bombers. Boko Haram typically uses kidnapped individuals as suicide attackers, coercing them into committing acts of terror either through indoctrination or under threat. In many cases, these women and children are drugged by Boko Haram fighters before being sent on suicide missions. The majority of Boko Haram's suicide attacks are carried out by women, according to a study by Yale University and West Point, with the youngest being just seven years old. Women and children are typically used more often due to the perception that they are worth less, with their use as bombers allowing more men to serve as fighters. In many cases, women and children recovered from Boko Haram are forced to undergo rehabilitation since many retain sympathies to the terror group.

== Bombings ==
=== Market bombing ===
Sometime in the afternoon of 10 October 2015, a group of suicide bombers detonated their explosives in a fish marketplace in Baga Sola, at the busiest time of day, killing 16 people. Witnesses reported hearing three explosions. It is not clear if the suicide bombers were coerced into committing this act.

=== Refugee camp bombing ===
The second group of suicide bombers attacked a village housing thousands of Nigerian and Chadian refugees. There were at least two blasts, and the attack claimed the lives of 22 people. According to UNICEF, 53 people were injured in the attacks.

== Aftermath ==
Following the attacks in Baga Sola the Office of the United Nations High Commissioner for Refugees (UNHCR), condemned the attacks. Additionally, the United Nations Security Council called the attacks "horrific", and "heinous". Head of the African Union, Nkosazana Dlamini-Zuma, condemned the "barbaric attacks", and issued condolences to the victims. The attacks on Baga Sola's market and refugees made it the worst attack to take place in the Lake Chad region. To date, Boko Haram has lost large amount of previously claimed territory, in addition the group has undergone organizational fracturing resulting from a disagreement over leadership.

== See also ==
- Timeline of Boko Haram insurgency
- ISIL territorial claims
- Tactics of terrorism
- Counter-terrorism
