= April 2012 Kaduna bombings =

Religiously motivated civilian attack in Nigeria

April 2012 Nigeria bombings
- Part of Boko Haram insurgency
- April 2012 Kaduna bombings (Nigeria)
- Location: Kaduna
- Date: 8 April 2012 (UTC+01:00)
- Target: Christian church
- Attack type: Suicide bombing
- Deaths: 38
- Injuries: unknown
- Perpetrator: Boko Haram

A suicide car bombing occurred on Easter Day church services in the Nigerian city of Kaduna on 8 April 2012, targeting Christians. At least 38 people were reported dead. Suspicion fell on Boko Haram, the radical Islamist sect blamed for hundreds of killings in the country in 2012 alone.

== Details ==
The blast struck Kaduna, the capital of Kaduna state, leaving charred motorcycles and debris strewn across a major road in the city where many gather to eat at informal restaurants and buy black market gasoline. Nearby hotels and homes had their windows blown out and roofs torn away by the force of the powerful explosion, which engulfed a group of motorcycle taxi-men.

The explosion damaged the nearby All Nations Christian Assemblies International Church and the ECWA Good News Church as churchgoers worshiped at an Easter service, the explosive-laden car attempted to go into the compound of the churches before it detonated, but was blocked by barriers in the street and was turned away by a security guard as police approached.

"We were in the holy communion service and I was exhorting my people and all of a sudden, we heard a loud noise that shattered all our windows and doors, destroyed our fans and some of our equipment in the church," Pastor Joshua Raji said.

== Responsibility ==
While no one immediately claimed responsibility for the attack, suspicion immediately fell on a radical Islamist sect blamed for hundreds of killings in the oil-rich country this year alone. And some fear the attack could further inflame tensions around Kaduna, a region on the dividing line between Nigeria's largely Christian south and Muslim north.

== See also ==
- December 2011 Northern Nigeria attacks
- December 2012 shootings in Northern Nigeria
