= June 2012 Kaduna church bombings =

Bombings in Nigeria

- Part of Boko Haram insurgency
- Location: Kaduna, Wusasa and Sabon Gari
- Date: 17 June 2012
- Target: Christian churches
- Attack type: Bombings, terrorism, mass murder
- Weapon: Three bombs
- Deaths: 12–19
- Injuries: 80

On 17 June 2012, three Christian churches in northern Nigeria were attacked by bomb explosions. At least 12 were killed and 80 were wounded. On 24 June 2012, Reuters UK reported that 19 people were killed.

== Bombings ==
Two of the three blasts happened in the Wusasa and Sabon-Gari districts of Zaria. The third blast happened in Kaduna, the state capital of the Kaduna State. There have been unconfirmed reports of two more blasts in the southern area of Kaduna.

A 24-hour curfew has been imposed by Kaduna State authorities.

== Responsibility ==
The Kaduna State have stated that Boko Haram could possibly be responsible for the attacks. According to other sources, no one is yet certain about the source of the attack but many believe it to be Boko Haram. This organisation has previously justified attacks on churches by saying they were retaliatory attacks for killings of Muslims in central Nigeria.

Boko Haram states it wants Islamic sharia law in place across Nigeria and is trying to trigger clashes between Christians and Muslims.
