= March 2020 Chad and Nigeria massacres =

Terrorist incident in Chad and Nigeria

- Part of the Boko Haram insurgency
- Location: Bohama military camp, Chad; Gorgi, Borno State, Nigeria
- Date: 23 March 2020
- Attack type: Bombing; Shooting
- Weapon: Unknown
- Deaths: 168 in total 98 in Chad; 70 in Nigeria

On 23 March 2020, Islamists carried out massacres of soldiers in Chad and Nigeria.

== Attack on Bohama camp ==
Starting at 5am, Boko Haram gunmen attacked Bohama military camp on an island in Lake Chad. The attack took place from four sides, attacking with about 400 soldiers. The jihadists overran the camp after seven hours of fighting. Reinforcement were sent from the town of Kaïga Kindjiria to relive the stricken camp but got stuck and were ambushed. In total 98 Chadian soldiers were killed, 47 wounded, and 24 vehicles destroyed.

== Gorgi ambush ==
In the evening, insurgents with rocket-propelled grenades and other heavy weaponry ambushed an army lorry and incinerated it, killing about 70 Nigerian soldiers, in Gorgi, a village in Borno State in the northeast of the country. Several other soldiers were injured and some others kidnapped. The lorry was part of a convoy which was travelling from Maiduguri to an ISIL camp.
