= December 2015 Chad suicide bombings =

Terrorist Attacks in Chad in 2015

- Part of the Boko Haram insurgency
- Location: Chad
- Date: 5 December 2015
- Attack type: Suicide bombing, mass murder
- Deaths: 19 (including 4 suicide bomber)
- Injuries: 130
- Perpetrator: Islamic State of Iraq and the Levant: Boko Haram

The December 2015 Chad suicide bombings occurred on 5 December 2015 when four suicide bombers at Lake Chad kill at least 15 people and another 130 were injured. Four women carried out the attack at a weekly market on an island on the Chadian side of the lake. No group has claimed responsibility; officials suspect the attacks were carried out by members of the Boko Haram militant group from neighboring Nigeria.
