= Baga Sola =

Baga Sola باغا سولا
- Town
- Location in Chad
- Coordinates: 13°32′11″N 14°18′50″E
- Country: Chad
- Region: Lac

Baga Sola (Arabic: باغا سولا) is a town in Lac Region on the shore of Lake Chad in western Chad. It has a hospital and a fish market, and a refugee camp for Nigerians and Chadians who fled Boko Haram.

Boko Haram suicide bombers killed 41 people on 10 October 2015.
