= Multinational Joint Task Force =

- Badge
- Active: 1994–present
- Countries: Current members; Benin; Cameroon; Chad; Nigeria; Former members; Niger
- Type: Multinational force
- Role: Combined operations
- Size: 7,500–10,000
- Headquarters: N'Djamena, Chad
- Engagements: Boko Haram insurgency; 2015 Baga attacks
- Website: https://mnjtffmm.org/

Commanders
- Current commander: Major General Ibrahim Sallau Ali

The Multinational Joint Task Force (MNJTF) is a combined multinational formation, comprising units, mostly military, from Benin, Cameroon, Chad, and Nigeria. It is headquartered in N'Djamena and is mandated to bring an end to the Boko Haram insurgency. Niger was a member until its withdrawal in 2025.

== History ==
The task force was first organized as a solely Nigerian force in 1994, during the administration of Sani Abacha, to "checkmate banditry activities and to facilitate free movement" along its northern border. In 1998 it was expanded to include units from neighboring Chad and Niger with the purpose of dealing with common cross-border security issues in the Lake Chad region, with its headquarters in the town of Baga, Borno State.

Islamist groups grew and expanded their operations during the 2000s and early 2010s. Boko Haram's insurgency began in 2009, and security forces across the region were increasingly directly challenged by jihadist militant groups. Boko Haram and Ansaru were the most active and well known. In April 2012, the MNJTF's mandate was expanded to encompass counter-terrorism operations.

Brigadier General Enitan Ransome-Kuti, son of Beko Ransome-Kuti and nephew of the musician Fela Kuti was a previous commander of the force.

== Development ==
In January 2015 the MNJTF headquarters in Baga, Nigeria, was overrun by militants of Boko Haram, who then proceeded to massacre local residents and destroy the town, displacing many citizens. At the time, only Nigerian soldiers were present in the HQ. There were reports that they fled the attackers. It was an ignominious moment for the MNJTF, and indeed the contributing nations. The political process of expanding the MNJTF was given new strength and energy which led to swifter progress, including the expansion of troop numbers and mandate, and relocation of the HQ to N'Djamena, Chad.

The most significant structural changes for the MNJTF that emerged from the meetings in 2015 were a rise in numbers, the creation of a new Concept of Operations under the supervision of the Lake Chad Basin Commission, and the move of the HQ to N'Djamena. It was agreed that a Nigerian officer would be the Force Commander for the duration of the mission against Boko Haram, with a Cameroonian as Deputy Commander and Chadian Chief of Staff. There is still considerable skepticism in the international community that the new force can deliver results, and its success or otherwise as a multinational endeavor will be closely monitored. Discontent has been voiced within coalition by Chadian president Idris Deby for shouldering disproportionate burden of fighting armed groups and announced confining its military operations to its boundaries.

On 30 March 2025, Niger announced its withdrawal from the Force.

== Strucutres ==
=== Headquarters ===
- Office of the Force Commander
- Deputy Commander
- Office of Chief of Staff
- Civilian Advisor
- Police Advisor
- Regional Intelligence Fusion Unit
- Legal Adviser
- Mission Support Team
- Military Staff
  - Chief of Administration
  - Chief of Military Information
  - Chief of Operations
  - Chief of Logistics
  - Chief of Plans
  - Chief of Communications
  - Chief of Civil-Military Cooperation
  - Medical Officer
  - Chief of Military Public Information

=== Sectors ===
| Name | Country | Headquarters (with AOR) | Unit | Commander |
|---|---|---|---|---|
| Sector 1 | Cameroon | Mora, Far North Region | 4th Joint Military Region, Cameroonian Armed Forces | Brigadier General Dobekreo Bouba |
| Sector 2 | Chad | Baga Sola | 4th Military Regiment, Chadian National Army | Brigadier General Djouma Yousouf Mahamat Itno |
| Sector 3 | Nigeria | Monguno, Borno State | 19 Brigade, Nigerian Army | Brigadier General G. M. Mutkut |
| Sector 4 (former) | Niger | Diffa (along the Yobe River) | 5th Military Regiment, Niger Armed Forces | Colonel Mamane Sani Kiaou |

== MNJTF Commanders ==
| No. | Portrait | Name | Country | Branch | Term Start | Term End |
|---|---|---|---|---|---|---|
| 1 | | Major General Tukur Yusuf Buratai | Nigeria | Nigerian Army | May 2015 | 31 July 2015 |
| 2 | | Major General Iliya Abbah | Nigeria | Nigerian Army | 31 July 2015 | January 2016 |
| 3 | | Major General Lamidi Adeosun | Nigeria | Nigerian Army | January 2016 | May 2017 |
| 4 | | Major General Lucky Irabor | Nigeria | Nigerian Army | May 2017 | August 2018 |
| 5 | | Major General C.O. Ude | Nigeria | Nigerian Army | August 2018 | November 19, 2019 |
| 6 | | Major General Ibrahim Manu Yusuf | Nigeria | Nigerian Army | November 19, 2019 | March 19, 2021 |
| 7 | | Major General Jide J. Ogunlade | Nigeria | Nigerian Army | March 19, 2021 | August 2021 |
| 8 | | Major General Abdul Khalifah Ibrahim | Nigeria | Nigerian Army | August 2021 | 19 April 2023 |
| 9 | | Major General Gold Chibuisi | Nigeria | Nigerian Army | 19 April 2023 | 14 July 2023 |
| 10 | | Major General Ibrahim Sallau Ali | Nigeria | Nigerian Army | 14 July 2023 | Present |

== See also ==
- Boko Haram insurgency
- G5 Sahel
- African Union Mission to Somalia
- United Nations-African Union Mission in Darfur
- Force Intervention Brigade
- American military intervention in Cameroon
