= Christmas 2011 Nigeria attacks =

Insurgent happening in Christmas Day 2011

December 2011 Northern Nigeria attacks
- Part of the Boko Haram insurgency
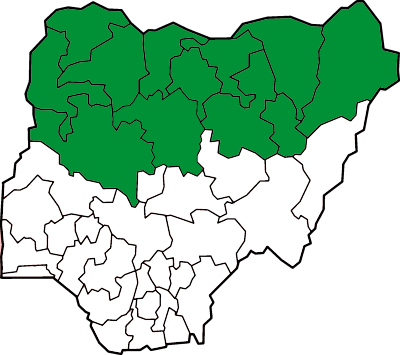
- Christian churches in Madalla, Nigeria destroyed by bombs during the celebration of Christmas

- Christmas 2011 Nigeria attacks (Nigeria)
- Location: Madalla, Jos, Gadaka, and Damaturu, Nigeria
- Date: 25 December 2011 (UTC+01:00)
- Target: Nigerian Christians
- Attack type: Suicide bombings, bombings and shootings
- Deaths: 41+
- Injuries: 57+
- Perpetrator: Boko Haram

A series of attacks occurred during Christmas Day church services in northern Nigeria on 25 December 2011. There were bomb blasts and shootings at churches in Madalla, Jos, Gadaka, and Damaturu. A total of 41 people were reported dead.

Boko Haram, a Muslim jihadist group in Nigeria, later claimed responsibility for the attacks.

== Bombings ==
=== Madalla ===
At least 37 people died and 57 others were injured in an attack at St. Theresa Catholic Church in Madalla, a satellite town of Abuja located 40 km (25 mi) from the city center. A local coordinator with the National Emergency Management Agency (NEMA) confirmed the death toll.

NEMA spokesperson Yushau Shuaibu said that the Madalla bombing occurred on the street outside the church. He added that the church, which can hold 1,000 people, was badly affected by the blast. Witnesses said that the windows of nearby houses were shattered by the explosion. Officials at the local hospital said that the condition of many injured people was serious. Slaku Luguard, a NEMA coordinator, said that rescue workers found at least 25 bodies and officials were tallying the wounded in various hospitals. NEMA acknowledged that it did not have enough ambulances to help the wounded. Luguard also said that an angry crowd, which gathered at the blast site, blocked emergency workers from getting inside: "We're trying to calm the situation. There are some angry people around trying to cause problems," he said.

=== Jos ===
An explosion hit the Mountain of Fire and Miracles Church in Jos and gunmen later fired on police who were guarding the area resulting in the death of one police officer.

Another two bombs were found in a nearby building and were disarmed.

=== Gadaka and Damaturu ===
Two explosions were reported in the city of Damaturu and another at a church in the northeastern town of Gadaka. At least one of the attacks in Damaturu was the work of a suicide car bomber, who rammed the building housing the headquarters of the State Security Service. At least three people were killed in that blast; a senior military commander allegedly targeted by it survived.

== Perpetrators ==
The attacks were claimed by the Islamist group Boko Haram.

== Reactions ==
Domestic

- President Goodluck Jonathan described the incident as "unfortunate" and "an unwarranted affront on our collective safety and freedom," adding that Boko Haram would "not be (around) for ever. It will end one day." He also said that "Nigerians must stand as one to condemn them."
- National Security Adviser Gen. Owoye Andrew Azazi recognised that Boko Haram was trying to provoke religious warfare among Nigerians and called on fellow Christians not to talk of retaliation against Muslims, but to question the strategic intentions of the actual perpetrators and act accordingly. He said that it is impossible to police a country as populous as Nigeria, and that the best way to defeat Boko Haram was through active citizen involvement to help the security services.
- People's Democratic Party Governor of Bayelsa State Timipre Sylva termed the attacks as "a senseless criminal behaviour by enemies of humanity. It is strange to the Nigerian character, and does not honour any faith or tradition. All men and women of conscience in Nigeria must condemn this callousness and contribute their various efforts to the collective task of stopping the mindless terror campaign. This is a time to stand together, faith with faith, nationality with nationality and culture with culture, to confront this growing threat to our nationhood and common humanity. Jesus Christ, whose birth is being celebrated this season, is a symbol of love and peace. And Mohammed, whose birth we shall also mark in the next month or two, preached peace and harmonious coexistence. It is, therefore, difficult to figure out the source of inspiration of these attackers."
- Nigeria Labour Congress – Acting general secretary Comrade Owei Lakemfa said: "Some Nigerians who left their homes to worship tragically did not return as their lives were cut short by bombs. They became victims of terrorists whose minds are as blurred as their vision. The NLC condemns in strong terms these vicious acts and commiserates with the victims families."
  - Arewa Consultative Forum – National Publicity Secretary Anthony Z.N. Sani said that the "ACF also wishes to say [that the] killing of innocent Nigerians is not correct and offends God and many people's sense of justice."
  - Christian Association of Nigeria – called on all religious groups in the country to condemn the act.

Former secretary Reverend John Joseph Hyap expressed sadness that the attack was carried out at the time Christians were celebrating Christmas with their counterparts in the world.

Supranational bodies

- African Union – Chairperson Jean Ping condemned the attacks and reiterated the AU's solidarity with the people and the government of Nigeria and its full support to their efforts to prevent and combat terrorism in all its forms.
- European Union – Catherine Ashton, the foreign policy chief, said: "I am profoundly shocked and saddened by the terrorist attacks which took place in several regions of Nigeria, including cowardly attacks on religious symbols and churches during the Christmas period, with appalling loss of human lives. I condemn in the strongest possible terms these attacks and all other acts of terrorism," she said, voicing her solidarity and condolences to the victims and their families."
- Organisation of Islamic Cooperation – Secretary General Ekmeleddin Ihsanoglu condemned the attacks and called for an "end to the bloodshed and the sufferings of the people." He also urged all Nigerians to help the authorities preserve peace and stability in the country.
- United Nations – Secretary-General Ban Ki-moon condemned the attacks in the strongest words and called for an end to all acts of sectarian violence in the country.

UN Security Council condemned the attacks and ratified the need to fight terrorism by all means. It also said that terrorism in all its forms and expressions is criminal and unjustifiable, regardless of its motives or where, when and who perpetrates the crimes. It further added that these actions cannot be linked to any religion, nationality, civilisation or ethnic group.

States

- Canada – Foreign Affairs Minister John Baird said: "These people died practising their religion—a basic human right. Canada strongly denounces such cowardly attacks without reservation. It is unconscionable that they occurred on Christmas against individuals attending religious services. We stand with the people and the government of Nigeria at this difficult time and join those calling for all responsible to be brought to justice."
- France – President Nicolas Sarkozy expressed "solidarity in [Nigeria's] fight against terrorism."

Foreign Minister Alain Juppe condemned the "violent attacks" and sent his condolences to the victims' families and the Nigerian government, while also denouncing the "outbreak of violence. As I expressed to the Nigerian authorities during my visit there in November last year, France supports them in their fight against terrorism."

- Germany – Foreign Minister Guido Westerwelle said that "even on Christmas Day, the world is not spared from cowardice and the fear of terrorism."
- Holy See – Pope Benedict XVI condemned the attacks as an "absurd gesture" and prayed to God that "the hands of the violent may cease to spread death and that justice and peace may reign in the world."

Director of the Press Office Father Federico Lombardi condemned the attacks and said: "We are close to the suffering of the Nigerian Church and the entire Nigerian people so tried by terrorist violence, even in these days that should be of joy and peace."

- Israel – Avigdor Lieberman's Foreign Ministry issued a statement reading that it would send medical aid to Nigeria. It also "condemned in the strongest terms these attacks carried out on Christmas Day."
- Italy – Foreign Minister Giulio Terzi said that the attacks had struck at "the universal principles of civility." He said,"I express my strongest condemnation of these vile attacks. Italy, which has always been at the forefront in the defence of freedom of religion and the promotion of dialogue and tolerance between religions, will continue to do the utmost...so that in Nigeria like elsewhere the principles of co-existence between religions and respect for freedom of religion are actively respected and defended."
- Japan – The Ministry of Foreign Affairs condemned the attacks and expressed its condolences for those people who were killed in the attacks and their bereaved families. It added that Japan hopes that the government and the people of Nigeria would overcome ethnic and religious differences and continue to make efforts toward the stabilisation of the situation of the security.
- Malaysia – Foreign Minister Anifah Aman said that Malaysia is profoundly shocked and saddened due to the attacks and added that his country remains "consistent with its firm stand against terrorism in all its forms and manifestations, especially if it involves civilians, irrespective of its location, including in Nigeria, Syria and Iraq. The taking of innocent lives and infliction of serious injuries constitute an unforgivable and inhuman act. The commission of such an act against a place of worship and during a mass congregation to mark a day of religious significance is even more deplorable." He further added that Malaysia "extends its condolences and sympathies to the bereaved families and the victims of injured people, respectively." Pan-Malaysian Islamic Party international committee chair Kamarudin Jaffar said that "PAS, together with the international community, condemns the church attacks in the strongest terms possible."
- Mexico – The Secretary of Foreign Affairs Patricia Espinosa condemned the attacks and reiterated her disapproval for any acts of "terrorism" and reminded everyone to stand in solidarity with the victims, their families and the Nigerian government.
- Qatar – The Ministry of Foreign Affairs condemned the attacks, considering them as "contravening moral and human values and religious tolerance principles."
- Russia – President Dmitry Medvedev sent his condolences to his Nigerian counterpart Goodluck Jonathan, saying: "It was with great sorrow that I learned of a number of acts of terror in various cities of Nigeria which caused loss of many human lives. I decisively condemn the cruelty and cynicism of the crimes and should specifically stress that terrorism has no nationality or religion. It is a global challenge which must be addressed by joining all the forces. Russia is ready to actively cooperate with the international community to counter the terrorist threat. Mr President, please convey my words of sympathy and support to everyone affected and my condolences to the families and friends of the victims."
- South Africa – President Jacob Zuma condemned the attacks and condoled the federal government.

A statement by the Department of International Relation and Co-operation read: "Following the attacks of 25 December, President Zuma has conveyed his heartfelt condolences to President Goodluck Jonathan, the Government and the people of the Federal Republic of Nigeria particularly families of the deceased and the injured."

- Spain – Deputy Head of Mission of the Spanish Embassy in Abuja Ignacio Garrido Antonio said that "Spain offers its sincere condolences to the President and people of Nigeria as well as the families of the victims. The Spanish Government expresses its solidarity and support to the people of Nigeria in the fight against terrorism and in its determination to hunt down the perpetrators of these attacks. The terrorist attacks of sectarian violence of yesterday come in addition to the abominable activities which the terrorist organisation Boko Haram has been carrying out of late against the Christian community in Nigeria."
- Tunisia – Newly elected President Moncef Marzouki condemned the attacks. In a message to his Nigerian counterpart he expressed his condolences to the families of the victims and expressed the compassion of the Tunisian people towards the Nigerian people.
- Turkey – Ministry of Foreign Affairs said that the attacks "saddened Turkey deeply and [the] Turkish people shared the sufferings of the Nigerian people and government of the friendly country."
- United Kingdom – Foreign Secretary William Hague said: "I condemn today's bomb attacks in or near churches in Nigeria. These are cowardly attacks on families gathered in peace and prayer to celebrate a day which symbolises harmony and goodwill towards others. I offer my condolences to the bereaved and injured."
- United States – The White House condemned the attacks and called them "senseless." It also offered its condolences to the Nigerian people and pledged to assist the authorities in bringing the perpetrators to justice. White House spokesman Jay Carney said "We condemn this senseless violence and tragic loss of life on Christmas Day. We offer our sincere condolences to the Nigerian people and especially those who lost family and loved ones."
- Zambia – President Michael Sata condemned the attacks and said that "on behalf of the people of the Republic of Zambia and, indeed on my own behalf, I extend our heartfelt condolences to you, the bereaved families and those injured in the explosion. It is our hope that the Almighty God will give these families comfort and guidance during this period."

Religious organisations

- Ahmadiyya Muslim Community of Malta – The Ahmadiyya Muslim Jamaat issued a statement in which it "strongly rejected and condemned" the attacks. The statement also read: "These acts of violence and hatred against innocent citizens are provocative and inhuman. These are no doubt, inhuman, heinous and cruel attacks, which should be condemned at every level. The Ahmadiyya Community condemns the attack in [the] strongest terms and demands [that] the authorities bring the culprits [to] justice as soon as possible. The head of the Ahmadiyya Muslim Community calls all the people to exhibit their kindness to one another, to show love and affection and for renewing ties of brotherhood and kinship so that peace in the best possible manner can be established in our societies."
- American Jewish Committee – Executive Director David Harris said that the "AJC, which for over a century has been profoundly committed to defending religious freedom, condemns these despicable attacks on Christian worshipers gathered to celebrate their holy day of Christmas. All people of goodwill, and especially all religious leaders of goodwill, should stand together in full solidarity with the victims and in unambiguous opposition to those who would kill and maim in the name of their own perverted faith. We pray for the full recovery of the injured and for the arrest and prosecution, to the full extent of the law in Nigeria, of those who planned and implemented these hate-filled, anti-Christian terrorist attacks."
- B'nai B'rith – International President Allan J. Jacobs said: "We are appalled by this grievous bloodshed. Our thoughts and prayers go out to our Christian brothers and sisters in Nigeria." Its International Executive Vice-president Daniel S. Mariaschin added: "These attacks and others by similar terrorist groups are a threat to the region and to the world. We call upon the international community to remain vigilant and to condemn in the strongest terms such acts of violence."
- Council on American-Islamic Relations – CAIR issued a statement that read: "We condemn the unconscionable and inexcusable attacks on Nigerian churches and offer sincere condolences to the loved ones of those killed or injured. Only a strong demonstration of interfaith unity will show those behind the attacks that they will never achieve their goal of dividing society along religious lines."
- Islamic Circle of North America – ICNA condemned the "brutal" attacks by saying the Nigerian government should swiftly act and bring the perpetrators of the attacks to justice and to take immediate steps to curb the rise of sectarian violence.
- Islamic Supreme Council of Canada – Founder Syed Soharwardy said: "This is an extremely deplorable crime...It's not Islam. This is an un-Islamic action" On the day of Christmas this terrorism is worse of its kind. The attacks on churches while Christians were praying and celebrating the birth of Jesus Christ cannot be done by anyone who knows and follows Islam, the group said in a media release published by CTV Calgary. We remind the media and the people that the group who has claimed the responsibility, Boko Haram is a Wahabi group. We do not consider these people to be the true followers of Islam. Islamic Supreme Council of Canada expresses deep sadness on the loss of innocent lives. We stand shoulder to shoulder with the worldwide Christian community in solidarity against this violence."
- Muslim Council of Britain – Secretary general Farooq Murad said: "There is nothing in our faith of Islam that can condone attacks on places of worship or on Christians as we have seen today. The attacks take place at the most important celebrations for Christians, it is offensive and Muslims condemn such actions. It threatens the fragile state of relations between Muslims and Christians, which has been peaceful in the past. Sectarian attacks as we have seen in Nigeria and in Iraq last week are reprehensible – people who claim to carry out such carnage in the name of Islam are completely mistaken and are as much enemy of Muslims as anyone else."

== See also ==
- April 2012 Kaduna bombings
