= Timeline of the Boko Haram insurgency =

Chronology of a Nigerian Islamist group's attempt to take over four countries

Timeline of the Islamist Insurgency in Nigeria is the chronology of the Islamist Insurgency in Nigeria, an ongoing armed conflict between Nigerian Islamist groups and the Nigerian Government.

== Religious violence before the insurgency ==
=== 2000 ===
- 21 February – 23 May – 2000 Kaduna riots – Between 1,000 and 5,000 people were killed in sectarian rioting between Christians and Muslims in Kaduna State following the introduction of Sharia law into that state.

=== 2001 ===
- 7–17 September – 2001 Jos riots – Nearly 1,000 people were killed following sectarian rioting between Christians and Muslims in Jos, Plateau State.

=== 2002 ===
- 20–23 November – Miss World riots – Around 250 were killed during rioting by Islamists across northern Nigeria as a response to an article deemed blasphemous.
- Mohammed Yusuf founded the organization that would become Boko Haram.

=== 2004 ===
- 4 February – Yelwa massacre – 78 Christians were massacred in Yelwa, Kebbi State.
- 2 May – Yelwa massacre – Several hundred Muslims were massacred in Yelwa as a reprisal attack from February.

=== 2008 ===
- 28–29 November – 2008 Jos riots – 381 people were killed in sectarian rioting between Christians and Muslims in Jos.

=== 2010 ===
- 17 January – 7 March – 2010 Jos riots – Around 992 people were killed in sectarian rioting between Christians and Muslims in Jos.

== Timeline of the insurgency ==
=== 2009 ===
- 26–29 July – 2009 Boko Haram uprising – Nearly 1,000 people were killed in clashes between Boko Haram militants and Nigerian soldiers in four locations in the northern Nigeria – Bauchi in Bauchi State, Maiduguri in Borno State, Potiskum in Yobe State and Wudil in Kano State – beginning the Boko Haram insurgency.
- 30 July – Mohammed Yusuf, spiritual leader of Boko Haram, was summarily executed in Maiduguri by the Nigerian Police after he had been handed over to them by Nigerian soldiers a day following the recent uprising. Abubakar Shekau takes control of the movement.

=== 2010 ===
- 5 September – Boko Haram attacked a village, killing a police officer and injuring a warden.
- 7 September – Bauchi prison break – Five people were killed and 721 inmates freed from prison in Bauchi by gunmen suspected to be from Boko Haram.
- 21 September – Boko Haram killed a village chief and a trader in Maiduguri.
- 6 October – Boko Haram assassinated the national vice-chairman of the All Nigeria Peoples Party in front of his house and attempted to kill the speaker of the Borno State House of Assembly, killing a policeman instead.
- 7 October – A senior staff of Bama Local Council in Borno was assassinated by Boko Haram gunmen.
- 9 October – Islamic scholar Sheikh Bashir Mustapha and Bashir Kashara were killed by Boko Haram.
- 10 October – A 10-year-old boy was beheaded by Boko Haram.
- 13 October – While attempting to assassinate Bauchi State official, Boko Haram killed a policeman.
- 20 October – Boko Haram killed a police inspector.
- 23 October – Boko Haram attempted to set a police station on fire but were pushed back, leading to the death of one of their members.
- 13 November – Two Boko Haram members riding a motorcycle killed a soldier at the 231 Battalion of a Nigerian Army base.
- 19 November – Boko Haram opened fire on a mosque, killing three people.
- 24 November – Boko Haram killed a policeman and a soldier who were on their way home.
- 24 December – 2010 Jos and Maiduguri attacks – 80 people were killed in a series of bombings in the city of Jos.
- 29 December
  - Boko Haram killed three police officers and two civilians in Maiduguri.
  - Boko Haram opened fire on the All Nigeria Peoples Party, killing eight people.
- 31 December – December 2010 Abuja attack – A bomb attack outside a barracks in Abuja, Federal Capital Territory, killed four civilians.

=== 2011 ===
- 29 May – May 2011 Nigeria bombings – Bombings killed 13 people in Bauchi and two people in Abuja during Goodluck Jonathan's swearing in as the new president. Bombings without fatalities occurred in Zaria, Kaduna State and Maiduguri.
- 16 June – 2011 Abuja police headquarters bombing – At least two people, the perpetrator and a traffic policeman, are killed in a failed bombing of Abuja's police headquarters. It was Nigeria's first suicide bombing.
- 20 June – Boko Haram attacked a bank in Kankara, Katsina State, killing seven people.
- 3 July – Boko Haram killed 10 people in Maiduguri.
- 9 July – Government troops killed 11 Boko Haram terrorists in Maiduguri.
- 19 August – Boko Haram attack in Maiduguri killed three police and a civilian.
- 25 August – Boko Haram attacked banks and police stations in Gombe, killing 12 people.
- 26 August – 2011 Abuja United Nations bombing – 21 people were killed in a bombing attack on a United Nations compound in Abuja.
- 4 November – November 2011 Nigeria attacks – Between 100 and 150 people were killed in a series of coordinated assaults in Damaturu, Yobe and Maiduguri.
- 15 December – Boko Haram attacked a military school near Kano, killing four officers.
- 17 December – Boko Haram battled with the police in Kano, killing three police and four militants.
- 22–23 December – December 2011 Nigeria clashes – 68 people, of whom 50 were militants, at least 7 soldiers, and 11 civilians, were killed in clashes between Boko Haram militants and Nigerian soldiers in Maiduguri and Damaturu.
- 25 December – Christmas 2011 Nigeria attacks – 41 people were killed by Boko Haram bomb attacks and shootings on churches in Damaturu and Gadaka in Yobe, Madalla in Niger State and in Jos. The attackers included Kabiru Sokoto.

=== 2012 ===
During 2012, 792 people were killed as a result of the Boko Haram insurgency.

==== January ====
- 5–6 January – January 2012 Northern Nigeria attacks – Around 37 Christians were killed by Boko Haram militants.
- 9 January – Boko Haram killed four police officers and four civilians in Potiskum.
- 20 January – January 2012 Northern Nigeria attacks – 183 people, of whom at least 150 were civilians and 32 police officers, were killed in Kano State by Boko Haram gunmen.
- 28 January – The Nigerian military killed 11 Boko Haram terrorists in Maiduguri.

==== February ====
- 8 February – A Boko Haram suicide bomber damaged the military headquarters in Kaduna.
- 20 February – Eight Boko Haram terrorists were killed by the military in Maiduguri.
- 27 February – Boko Haram attacked a police station and a bank in the town of Jama'are, Bauchi State, killing three police.

==== March ====
- 8 March – Sokoto hostage rescue attempt – In Sokoto, Boko Haram killed two builders - one British and the other Italian - whom they had been holding hostage since kidnapping them in May 2011 in Birnin Kebbi. The double murder was committed as the British Special Boat Service and the Nigerian Army tried to rescue them.

==== April ====
- 8 April – April 2012 Kaduna bombings – 38 people were killed by a bombing at a church in Kaduna.
- 29 April – Boko Haram killed 20 people in churches across northern Nigeria.
- 30 April – Boko Haram attacked a police convoy in Jalingo, Taraba State, killing 11 people.

==== June ====
- 3 June – Boko Haram killed nine people in a suicide bombing of a church in Bauchi State.
- 5–6 June – Soldiers killed 16 Boko Haram terrorists in Maiduguri.
- 8 June – Boko Haram killed five people in a suicide bombing of a police headquarters in Maiduguri.
- 17 June
  - June 2012 Kano church bombings – Around 40 Christians were killed by Boko Haram at churches in Kano.
  - June 2012 Kaduna church bombings – 19 people were killed by bomb attacks against three churches in Kaduna.
  - Boko Haram killed 150 people across Plateau State.

==== July ====
- 13 July – Boko Haram killed five people in a suicide bombing of a mosque in Maiduguri.

==== August ====
- 5 August – Boko Haram killed six soldiers and two civilians in a suicide bombing of a convoy in Damaturu.
- 7 August – Deeper Life Bible Church shooting – 19 people were killed by Boko Haram gunmen in a mass shooting at a church in Kogi State.
- 8 August – Two Nigerian soldiers and one civilian were killed in a mosque in an apparent reprisal attack for the previous day's massacre.
- 12 August – A battle between Boko Haram and the government in Maiduguri killed 20 terrorists and a soldier.

==== September ====
- 7 September – Soldiers killed seven Boko Haram terrorists in Maiduguri.
- 24 September – Soldiers killed 35 Boko Haram terrorists in Adamawa and Yobe States.

==== October ====
- 1–2 October – Federal Polytechnic, Mubi attack – At least 25 people were killed at the Federal Polytechnic, Mubi, Adamawa State.
- 7 October – Soldiers killed 30 Boko Haram terrorists in Damaturu.

==== November ====
- 9 November – Boko Haram killed three policemen in an attack on their police station near Damaturu.
- 25 November – 11 people were killed in a Boko Haram suicide bombing on a military barracks in Jaji.
- 26 November – Boko Haram attacked a police station in Abuja, killing two police officers.

==== December ====
- 1–2 December – Boko Haram attacked the village of Chibok, Borno, killing 10 and killed five police in Gamboru Ngala.
- 24 December – Boko Haram killed six people at a church in the village of Peri.
- 25 December – December 2012 shootings in Northern Nigeria – 27 Christians were killed in Maiduguri and Potiskum by suspected Boko Haram militants.
- 28 December – Another 15 Christians were killed in the village of Musari by unknown gunmen.

=== 2013 ===
- 2013 fatalities were at least 1,000:

==== January ====
- 1 January – A Nigerian Army raid killed 13 militants.
- 2 January – Boko Haram attacked a police station in the town of Song.
- 21–22 January – Boko Haram killed 23 civilians in Damboa, Borno.

==== February ====
- 1 February – Soldiers battled with Boko Haram in Borno, killing 17 terrorists and one soldier.
- 8 February – Two shootings of polio vaccinators kill 9 women.

==== March ====
- 3–20 March – Boko Haram terrorists were killed in a government operation in Monguno, Borno.
- 18 March – 2013 Kano bus bombing – Between 22 and 65 people are killed by a car bombing in Kano.
- 31 March – The government battled with Boko Haram in Kano State, resulting in the deaths of 14 terrorists and one soldier.

==== April ====
- 16 April – 2013 Baga massacre – 187 people were killed in Baga in Borno. It is unclear whether the Nigerian military or Boko Haram is responsible for the massacre.
- 19–20 April – An unknown number of people were killed in a battle between Boko Haram and the government in Baga.

==== May ====
- 7 May – Boko Haram attacked barracks, a prison, and a police station in the town of Bama. The attack killed 22 police, 14 prison guards, Two soldiers, four civilians, and 13 terrorists. In total this attack killed 55 people.
- 14 May – 53 people were killed by Boko Haram in Benue State. The government also began an offensive operations in Borno, Yobe, and Adamawa states.

==== June ====
- June – Nine children were killed in Maiduguri and 13 students and teachers were killed in Damaturu by Boko Haram.

==== July ====
- 6 July – Yobe State school shooting – More than 42 were killed by Boko Haram gunmen in a school in Yobe. Boko Haram also attacked a police station and a bank in the town of Karim Lamido, killing three police officers.
- 27 July – 20 people were killed by Boko Haram in Baga.
- 29 July – 12 people were killed by Boko Haram in Kano.

==== August ====
- 4–5 August – Boko Haram attacked a military base in the town of Malam Fatori and a police station in the town of Bama, Borno. The attack left 32 terrorists, two soldiers, and a police officer dead.
- 11 August – Konduga mosque shooting – 44 people were killed and 26 others injured in a mass shooting by Boko Haram in a mosque in Konduga, Borno.
- 15 August – Boko Haram killed 11 people in Damboa.
- 19 August – Boko Haram killed 44 people in the village of Demba.
- 30 August – Boko Haram killed 24 pro-government militiamen near the town of Monguno.

==== September ====
- 4–5 September – Boko Haram killed 15 people in the town of Gajiram and five people in the village of Bulabilin Ngaura.
- 6 September – A government operation in Borno killed 50 terrorists.
- 8 September – A battle between a pro-government militia and Boko Haram in the town of Benisheik, Borno, resulted in an unknown number of casualties.
- 12 September – An ambush by Boko Haram left 40 soldiers dead.
- 12–18 September – An offensive by the Nigerian Army left 150 Islamists and 16 soldiers dead.
- 17 September – Boko Haram killed 143 people on the road between Maiduguri and Damaturu.
- 18 September – Benisheik massacre – 161 people were killed in attacks in Benisheik, blamed on Boko Haram.
- 19 September – Boko Haram killed 16 people on the road between Maiduguri and Damboa.
- 20 September – A shootout in Abuja killed seven to nine people.
- 29 September – Gujba college massacre – More than 50 students were killed, many of whom were Muslims, in Yobe by Boko Haram gunmen.

==== October ====
- 6 October – Battle of Damboa – The Nigerian military and Boko Haram battled in Damboa, killing 20 people.
- 10 October – An attack in Damboa left at least 20 killed (15 suspected militants and 5 civilians).
- 10 October – An attack in the town of Logumani killed 19.
- October – Government forces raided rebel camps, killing around 101 Boko Haram fighters.
- 24 October – Nigeria troops killed 74 Boko Haram terrorists in the villages of Galangi and Lawanti.
- 29 October – Boko Haram raided Damaturu. At least 128 people were killed (95 militants, 23 soldiers, 8 policemen, and 2 civilians).
- 31 October – Boko Haram killed 27 people in the village of Gulumba.

==== November ====
- 2 November
  - Boko Haram killed 13 people in the village of village of T-Junction.
  - Borno wedding convoy massacre – Boko Haram killed 30 people in a wedding convoy near the town of Bama.
- 9 November – Clashes between Boko Haram and the Nigeria military killed five terrorists and two Nigerian soldiers.
- 13 November – The US designated Boko Haram as a "foreign terrorist organization."
- 23 November – 12 were killed in the village of Sandiya after a Boko Haram attack.
- 28 November – 50 Boko Haram terrorists were killed by government troops around Gwoza hills.

==== December ====
- 2 December – Boko Haram attacked several military bases in Maiduguri, killing several people.
- 20 December – Boko Haram attacked a military barracks in Bama, killing 20 soldiers.
- 23 December – A battle between Boko Haram and the Nigerian military near the border with Cameroon killed 50 terrorists, 15 Nigerian soldiers, and five civilians.
- 28 December – Nigerian troops killed 56 Boko Haram terrorists in Alafa forest.
- 29 December – Eight people were killed by Boko Haram in the village of Tashan Alade.

=== 2014 ===
==== January ====
- 14 January – 35 people were killed in a bombing by Boko Haram militants in Maiduguri.
- 26 January – Chakawa and Kawuri attacks – 138 were killed in total.
- 31 January – 11 Christians killed in Chakawa by Boko Haram militants.

==== February ====
- 11 February – February 2014 Konduga massacre – Dozens of Christian villagers were killed by Boko Haram militants in Konduga, Borno.
- 15 February
  - Izghe attack – Boko Haram gunmen killed 106 people in the village of Izghe, Borno.
  - 90 Christians and 9 Nigerian soldiers are killed in Gwoza, Borno, by Boko Haram.
- 24 February – Dozens were killed as Boko Haram again raided Izghe.
- 25 February – February 2014 Buni Yadi massacre – 59 male students were killed in a school massacre in Buni Yadi, Yobe.
- 26 February – Boko Haram attacked the towns of Michika in Adamawa, Shuwa, and Kirchinga killing 37 civilians. Six terrorists were also killed.

==== March ====
- 14 March – Boko Haram attacked the heavily fortified Giwa barracks in Maiduguri, freeing comrades from a detention facility. The military then executes about 600 unarmed recaptured detainees, according to Amnesty International.

==== April ====
- 14 April – April 2014 Abuja bombing – Over 88 people were killed in a twin bombing attack in Abuja.
- 15 April – Chibok schoolgirls kidnapping – Boko Haram kidnapped 276 teenage female students from a secondary school in Chibok, Borno.

==== May ====
- 1 May – May 2014 Abuja bombing – 19 people were killed in Abuja by a car bomb.
- 5 May – 2014 Gamboru Ngala attack – At least 300 people were killed in the twin towns of Gamboru and Ngala in Borno by Boko Haram militants.
- 13–14 May – Chibok ambush
- 20 May – 2014 Jos bombings – At least 118 villagers were killed by car bombs in Jos.
- 21 May – 27 villagers are killed by Boko Haram gunmen in northeastern Nigeria.
- 27 May – May 2014 Buni Yadi attack – 49 security personnel and 9 civilians are killed during a Boko Haram attack on a military base in Yobe.
- 30 May – The third emir of Gwoza, Idrissa Timta, is assassinated during a Boko Haram ambush.

==== June ====
- 1 June – 2014 Mubi bombing – At least 40 people are killed by a bombing in Mubi.
- 2 June – Gwoza massacre – At least 200, mostly Christians, are killed in several villages in Borno by Boko Haram.
- 20–23 June – June 2014 Borno State attacks – At least 70 people are killed and 91 women and children kidnapped by Boko Haram militants in Borno State.
- 23–25 June – June 2014 Kaduna and Abuja attacks – Around 171 people are killed in a series of attacks in Kaduna State and a bombing in Abuja.
- 26 June – Over 100 militants are killed by the Nigerian military during a raid on two Boko Haram camps.
- 28 June – 11 people are killed by a bombing in Bauchi.

==== July ====
- 1 July – July 2014 Maiduguri bombing
- 18 July – Damboa massacre – At least 100 people are killed by a Boko Haram attack in Damboa, leaving the town almost destroyed.
- 22 July – 51 people are killed by Boko Haram in Chibok.

==== September ====
- 12 September – Battle of Konduga
- 19 September – September 2014 Mainok shooting – Around 30 people are killed by Boko Haram militants at a busy market in Mainok, Borno.

==== October ====
- 31 October – At least 4 people were killed, 32 injured and 13 vehicles destroyed by an explosion at a bus station in Gombe.

==== November ====
- 2 November – Kogi prison break – 99 inmates in Kogi State were freed by suspected Boko Haram rebels.
- 3 November – 2014 Potiskum bombings – A suicide bomber in Yobe killed 15 Shiites.
- 10 November – 2014 Potiskum bombings, 2014 Potiskum school bombing – A suicide bomber killed 46 students.
- 25 November – November 2014 Maiduguri bombings – Over 45 people are killed by two suicide bombers in Maiduguri.
- 27 November – Damasak massacre – Around 50 people were killed in Damasak, Borno, by Boko Haram militants.
- 28 November – 2014 Kano bombing – At least 120 Muslim followers of the Emir of Kano, Muhammad Sanusi II, were killed during a suicide bombing and gun attack by Boko Haram. The 4 gunmen are subsequently killed by an angry mob.

==== December ====
- 1 December – At least 5 people were killed by two female suicide bombers who detonated themselves at a crowded market place in Maiduguri.
- 10 December – At least 4 people were killed and 7 injured by female suicide bombers near a market in Kano.
- 11 December – 30 people are killed and houses were destroyed by Boko Haram militants in Gajiganna, Borno.
- 13 December – 2014 Gumsuri kidnappings – Between 32 and 35 people were killed and between 172 and 185 are kidnapped by Boko Haram in Borno.
- 22 December – 2014 Gombe bus station bombing – At least 27 people were killed at a bus station by a bombing in Gombe State.
- 28–29 December – December 2014 Cameroon clashes – 85 civilians, 94 militants, and 2 Cameroonian soldiers were killed following a failed Boko Haram offensive into Cameroon's Far North Region.

=== 2015 ===
==== January ====
- 1 January – On January 1, 2015 Boko Haram militants hijacked a bus near Koza, Cameroon. The vehicle was travelling between Kousseri and Maroua in the Far North province of Cameroon, but the hijackers chose to drive it to the Nigerian border instead. Between 15 and 25 people were killed in the attack, and at least 10 were wounded.
- 3–7 January – 2015 Baga massacre – Boko Haram militants razed the entire town of Baga. Bodies lay strewn on Baga's streets with hundreds of people having been killed. Boko Haram controlled 70% of Borno, which is the worst-affected by the insurgency.
- 3 January – Fleeing villagers from a remote part of Borno reported that Boko Haram had three days prior kidnapped around 40 boys and young men.
- 4 January – The Chadian military launched an offensive that resulted in the deaths of 200 terrorists and nine Chadian personnel.
- 5 January – News emerged that two days prior hundreds of Boko Haram militants had overrun several towns in northeast Nigeria and captured the military base in Baga.
- 9 January – Refugees fled Borno following the Baga massacre. 7,300 fled to neighbouring Chad while over 1,000 were trapped on the island of Kangala in Lake Chad. The Nigerian Army vowed to recapture the town, while Niger and Chad withdrew their forces from a transnational force tasked with combating militants.
- 10 January – January 2015 Maiduguri suicide bombing – A female suicide bomber, apparently around 10 years old, killed herself and 19 others, possibly against her will, at a market in Maiduguri.
- 11 January – Two female suicide bombers, each believed to be around 10 years old, killed themselves and three others at a market in Potiskum.
- 12 January – January 2015 raid on Kolofata – Boko Haram militants launched a failed raid on Kolofata in Far North, Cameroon. The Cameroonian military said one officer was killed while the Islamic group lost between 143 and 300 rebels.
- 16 January – The military of Chad entered Cameroon to assist in fighting against Boko Haram insurgents.
- 17 January – Following the 16 January Chad authorities decision to send troops to Nigeria and Cameroon to fight Boko Haram militants, the Russian ambassador to the country pledged to supply Cameroon with more modern weapons to combat the Islamist insurgents.
- 18 January – Boko Haram militants kidnapped 80 people and killed three others from villages in north Cameroon.
- 20 January – Boko Haram leader Abubakar Shekau claimed responsibility for the Baga massacre earlier in the month.
- 23 January – 2015 West African offensive began.
- 24 January – 15 people are killed as Boko Haram gunmen attempted to burn down the village of Kambari near Maidaguri.
- 25 January – Boko Haram rebels launched a large offensive against Nigerian forces in Maiduguri leading to the deaths of at least eight civilians, up to 53 militants, and an unknown number of soldiers. Although the attack failed, the rebels captured the nearby strategic town of Monguno. The status of the 1,400 soldiers stationed in Monguno was unknown. As a result of these attacks, Boko Haram controlled four out of five roads leading into the major city, prompting fears that it would be taken as well.
- 28 January – Boko Haram fighters killed 40 people while on a rampage in Adamawa.
- 29 January – The Nigerian military, in collaboration with Chadian soldiers, captured the border town of Michika from Boko Haram rebels.
- 31 January – The African Union pledged to send up to 7,500 international soldiers to aid Nigeria's fight against Boko Haram. Chadian forces claim to have killed 120 Boko Haram fighters while losing only 3 soldiers of their own during fighting in the north of Cameroon.

==== February ====
- 1 February – Boko Haram again attacked Maiduguri. This time, the city was attacked from four out of the five sides. The attack was unsuccessful, but many civilians inside the city panicked. Also, a suspected Boko Haram suicide bomber kills himself and eight others at the residence of a politician in Potiskum. Another suicide bomber killed five people outside a mosque in the city of Gombe.
- 2 February – A female suicide bomber attacked minutes after the President of Nigeria left an election rally in the city of Gombe, killing at least one person and injuring eighteen.
- 4 February – Fotokol massacre – Boko Haram militants reportedly raided the Cameroonian town of Fotokol in Far North, Cameroon, killing scores of people. Also on 4 February, the Chad Army says it have killed 200 militants and lost nine soldiers while capturing the border town of Gamboru Ngala in Borno.
- 6 February – 2015 Niger raid – Boko Haram launched raids on the towns of Bosso and Diffa, both in Niger, the first time that the group has attacked the country. The Chadian military assists the Nigerien Armed Forces in repelling the attack. Five Nigeriens were killed; the government says 109 Boko Haram militants were killed as well.
- 7 February – Nigeria postponed its general election for six weeks to allow its armed forces to control parts of the country controlled by Boko Haram.
- 9 February – Boko Haram launched a raid on a prison in the town of Diffa in Niger. Authorities repelled the attack.
- 12 February – The West African Allied Forces, led by Nigeria and supported by Cameroon, Chad, and Niger, invaded Sambisa Forest in Borno, a stronghold of Boko Haram, killing scores of the insurgents. Elsewhere, the town of Mbuta, 15 miles northeast of Maiduguri, was raided by Boko Haram, resulting in the deaths of 8 residents. A dozen people were killed in a suicide blast at Biu, 100 miles southwest of Maiduguri.
- 13 February – Boko Haram militants attack Chad for the first time after 30 fighters crossed Lake Chad in four motorboats and attacked the village of Ngouboua. Chad had recently joined Nigeria, Niger, and Cameroon in a military coalition against Boko Haram.
- 14 February – Boko Haram forces assaulted Gombe. The Nigerian military repels the attack, although the militants managed to overrun a checkpoint on the edge of the city before retreating. The attack coincided with the beginning of a Nigerian offensive to roll back Boko Haram forces around the northeast.
- 15 February – February 2015 Nigeria bombings - A teenage female suicide bomber killed 16 people and wounded 30 others at a bus station in Damaturu.
- 16 February – Nigeria regained the key town of Monguno, Borno, from Boko Haram. The town had previously fallen to the militants on 25 January.
- 18 February – The Nigerian Army says they killed 300 militants in northeastern Nigeria. A warplane bombed a funeral ceremony in Niger, killing 37 civilians. The plane remains unidentified, with the Nigerian government denying responsibility.
- 20 February – Boko Haram militants killed 34 people in attacks across Borno, 21 in Chibok.
- 21 February – The Nigerian Army retook Baga, which had fallen to Boko Haram on 3 January.
- 22 February – February 2015 Nigeria bombings - A child female suicide bomber killed five people and wounded dozens of others outside a market in Potiskum.
- 24 February
  - February 2015 Nigeria bombings – A male suicide bomber killed 17 people at a bus station in Potiskum.
  - February 2015 Nigeria bombings - Two male suicide bombers killed 10 people at a bus station in Kano.
  - Chadian soldiers killed over 200 Boko Haram fighters in a clash near the town of Gamboru, close to the Cameroon-Nigeria border. A Chad Army soldier is killed and nine are wounded.
- 26 February – At least 35 people were killed in two attacks targeting the cities of Biu in Borno and Jos.
- 28 February – Two female suicide bombers killed up to four civilians near Damaturu.

==== March ====
- 2 March – Battle of Konduga – A senior military officer said that 73 Boko Haram militants disguised as herders were killed near Konduga town in Borno. In addition, the Chadian military recaptured the town of Dikwa, also in Borno.
- 7 March
  - March 2015 Maiduguri suicide bombing – Five suicide bomb blasts left 54 people dead and 143 wounded in Maiduguri. After the explosions, Boko Haram formally declared allegiance to Islamic State.
  - Boko Haram pledged allegiance to the Islamic State in Iraq and the Levant.
- 8 March – Forces from Niger and Chad launch a ground and air offensive against Boko Haram Islamist militants in northeastern Nigeria.
- 9 March – Chadian and Nigerien forces retake the towns of Malam Fatouri and Damasak in northeastern Nigeria.
- 13 March – The Nigerian government admits to using foreign mercenaries in the fight against Boko Haram.
- 16 March – Nigeria, Chad, and Niger began a battle to liberate Damasak, Borno, from Boko Haram militants.
- 17 March – The Nigerian military reclaimed the small city of Bama, Borno, from Boko Haram.
- 18 March – Battle of Damasak; Damasak massacre – Niger and Chad captured the city of Damasak following a successful battle. A mass grave of 90 people was discovered in the city.
- 21 March – Chadian forces established a presence in the border town of Gamboru, Borno, following recent attacks there by Boko Haram gunmen that killed 11 people.
- 27 March – The town of Gwoza was recaptured by the Nigerian military.
- 28 March – Voters in Nigeria went to the polls for a general election. Gunmen killed at least 15 voters including an opposition house of assembly candidate for Dukku in Gombe.
- 29 March – Voting in the Nigerian general election was delayed for a second day due to delays and malfunctioning equipment. So far, 43 people have been killed in Boko Haram attacks.

==== April ====
- 5 April – Boko Haram militants dressed as preachers killed at least 24 citizens of Kwafaja Village in Borno, with some reports saying that up to 50 were killed.
- 9 April – Members of Boko Haram entered the village of Dile in Borno, killing 20.
- 17 April – While soldiers were evacuating the town of Gwoza in Borno, militants entered the town and slit the throats of at least 12 townspeople.
- 21 April – As the military led efforts to evacuate the town of Baga in northern Nigeria, militants planted mines and fired rockets at military vehicles, killing eight soldiers and a civilian.
- 24 April – The last area controlled in Nigeria by Boko Haram's forces was in Sambisa Forest, Borno.
- 25 April
  - Boko Haram retook the town of Marte in Borno, invading with tanks and over 2,000 troops.
  - Boko Haram attacked an island in Lake Chad, killing 46 Nigerian soldiers and 28 civilians.

==== June ====
- 12 June – Several days of nighttime raids on six remote villages that left at least 37 people dead in Northeastern Nigeria.
- 15 June – June 2015 Monguno bombing - A sack of bombs exploded at an abandoned Boko Haram camp in Monguno, Borno.
- 16 June – 2015 N'Djamena bombings – Twin suicide bombings blamed on Boko Haram jihadists killed 24 people and wounded more than 100 in the first such attacks in Chad's capital N'Djamena. Monday's attacks, which targeted the police headquarters and a police academy, were the first in the capital.
- 17 June – Chad banned people from wearing the full-face veil, following the double suicide bombing in N'Djamena. They also banned vehicles with tinted windows.
- 22 June – 30 people were killed at crowded mosque by a young female suicide bombers. Boko Haram marks the start of Ramadan by targeting a mosque that they see as falling short in following the Islamic prophet Muhammad. The second teen appeared to run away and exploded further away, killing only herself, eyewitnesses said.
- 30 June – 30 June and 1 July 2015 Borno massacres

==== July ====
- 1 July – 30 June and 1 July 2015 Borno massacres
- 1–2 July – July 2015 Kukawa massacre – Boko Haram militants attacked mosques on 1 and 2 July. Forty-eight men and boys were killed on the 1st at a mosque in Kukawa. Seventeen were wounded in the attack. Ninety-seven others, mostly men, were killed in numerous mosques on the 2nd, with a number of women and young girls killed in their homes. An unknown number were wounded.
- 5 July – 5 July 2015 Nigeria attacks
  - A suicide bomber attacked a church in Potiskum, killing five people.
  - Two bomb attacks in Jos killed at least 44 people.
- 12 July - Fotokol bombings
- 16 July – July 2015 Gombe bombings
- 22 July – July 2015 Gombe bombings

==== August ====
- 11 August – An explosion in Borno State killed 47 people.

==== September ====
- 20 September – September 2015 Borno State bombings

==== October ====
- 10 October – Baga Sola bombings

==== November ====
- 17 November – A suicide bombing in Yola, Adamawa State, tore through a marketplace, killing 32 people and wounding 80 others.

==== December ====
- 5 December – December 2015 Chad suicide bombings
- 28 December – December 2015 Madagali and Maiduguri bombings

=== 2016 ===
==== January ====
- 6 January – Boko Haram gunmen raided Izageki village in northern Nigeria, close to Sambisa Forest, Boko Haram's hideout and killed at least two people. The gunmen pursued fleeing civilians and another militant armed with a suicide belt blew himself near a market, killing another five people.
- 13 January – A suicide bomber blew himself up inside a mosque in Kouyape, Far North Region, Cameroon, close to the Nigerian border. The blast killed twelve people and wounded another one. The attack occurred at dawn and was attributed to Boko Haram although it did not claim responsibility.
- 18 January – A suicide bomber attacked a mosque in the village of Nguetchewe in northern Cameroon, killing four worshippers and wounding another two. No group claimed responsibility, but Boko Haram is suspected.
- 25 January – 2016 Bodo bombings – Four suicide bombers attacked a busy market in the town of Bodo, Far North Region, close to the Nigerian border. The blasts killed at least 30 people and wounded another 65. No group claimed responsibility, but Boko Haram is suspected.
- 27–28 January – Weekend rampage with a total death toll of at least 65 people and twice that number injured. Affected areas were various villages in Dalori and outskirts of Maiduguri, the capital of Borno Province. Residents say the death toll was even higher, with as many as 100 dead.
- 29 January
  - Two suicide bombers attacked a school, housing Nigerian refugees in northern Cameroon, killing four people and wounding another twelve. No group claimed responsibility, but Boko Haram is suspected.
  - A 12-year-old blew himself up in a market. The blast killed at least 11 people. The attack occurred on 29 January in Gombi, Adamawa State.
- 30 January – At least 86 people are killed and hundreds others injured in an attack by Boko Haram militants on Dalori village, four kilometers from Maiduguri
- 31 January
  - A Boko Haram terrorist blew himself up on a motorcycle in Guié, Chad.
  - A Boko Haram terrorist blew himself up in Miterine, Chad.

==== February ====
- 9 February
  - Two Boko Haram suicide bombers attacked a Muslim funeral gathering in northern Cameroon, 10 km (6 miles) east of the Nigerian border. Six civilians were killed and another thirty were wounded. It is the first known Boko Haram strike in Cameroon at a funeral gathering, although the militants had attacked a baptism.
  - Two female suicide bombers sneaked into an internally displaced persons (IDP) camp and detonated themselves in the middle of it in the northeast Nigerian town of Dikwa, Borno. The blasts killed 60 people and wounded another 78. No group claimed responsibility but Boko Haram is suspected.
- 12 February – Members of Boko Haram attacked a village near Kachifa, killing eight people.
- 13 February – Members of Boko Haram attacked Yakshari, killing 22 people.
- 19 February – Two suicide bombers kill at least 24 people and injure 112 others at a market in northern Cameroon.
- 27 February – At least 92 militants were killed in a joint operation carried out by the Cameroon and Nigerian Armies and over 850 villagers were freed in the Nigerian village of Kumshe which is close to the border with Cameroon.

==== March ====
- 16 March – March 2016 Maiduguri bombings – Three female suicide bombers killed 22 people and injured 18 in Umarari village, on the outskirts of Maiduguri.
- 26 March – At least four people were killed during a Boko Haram raid in the remote village of Tumpun near Lassa in Askira/Uba Local Government Area.
- 30 March – Six soldiers of the Niger Armed Forces were killed and three others wounded in southeastern Niger in an attack attributed to Boko Haram.

==== April ====
- 5 April
  - In an attack in Izige, Nigeria, Boko Haram killed three soldiers and two vigilante members, but were subsequently forced to retreat by the military.
  - Two suicide bombers exploded their devices in a public transport vehicle that was going to a market in Diffa, Niger. At least three civilians were killed and several others injured.
- 8 April – Nigerian troops killed four suspected Boko Haram suicide bombers before they could attack Maiduguri. Three soldiers sustained injuries during the incident.
- 20 April – At least seven or eight people have been killed at a refugee camp in Nigeria after two female suicide bombers blew themselves up. The bombing took place in the north-east of Nigeria near the border with Cameroon. Several people were wounded in the attack.
- 24 April – Boko Haram were reported to have killed 30 people during a raid in Alau village in Borno.

==== May ====
- 11 May – Nigerian Army says troops from its 7 Division Garrison, intercepted a Boko Haram terrorist detonating a suicide bomb in Sulaimanti community, in the outskirts of Maiduguri.
- 12 May – A suicide bomber who was stopped from entering a government compound killed at least six people, including two police officers, in Maiduguri.
- 29 May – In Biu, Borno, a tricycle taxi triggered an old IED, killing four civilians and a soldier. Two people were wounded.

==== June ====
- 4 June – At least 32 people were killed and 67 injured after hundreds of members of Boko Haram attacked the city of Bosso in Niger. Many places in the city were torched and shot at. There were also several deaths and injuries of the attacker's side.
- 5 June – A woman was stabbed to death by two men after allegedly insulting Muhammad in Kano.
- 6 June – Ten fisherman are killed by Boko Haram in Darak, Cameroon.
- 12 June – Four women were killed by 14 assailants after being dragged outside of their homes in Mairari, Nigeria.
- 14 June – 10 fishermen were killed by militants, and soon after 42 more were killed by Boko Haram at Lake Chad in Cameroon.
- 15 June – At least 4 females were killed and several abducted after many Boko Haram militants attacked a village. Some sources say the number of those kidnapped is four. Many houses were burned down and shot at. Vigilantes followed the attackers and rescued one of the kidnapped after a gun battle. A vigilante was injured in Kau-Tuva, Nigeria.
- 16 June – Kuda funeral attack – At least 24 people were killed and at least 10 injured when Boko Haram militants attacked a funeral in Kuda, Adamawa.
- 17 June – Seven people were killed and 12 injured in an attack on policemen in Ghafam, Niger.
- 20 June – At least 2 people were killed after several Boko Haram militants attacked Wumbi in Nigeria the second attack there by them in a week.
- 25 June – At least 4 civilians were killed in another in a series off attacks by Boko Haram militants in Gouzoudoum and Kaldjiwa, Cameroon.
- 26 June – The Nigerian Army claimed they had rescued 5,000 people, mostly women and children, from four remote villages in Borno (Zangebe, Maiwa, Algaiti and Mainar) and killed six Boko Haram fighters. A civilian JTF member was also killed. The army said it killed two more Boko Haram fighters in operations at 11 other villages.
- 30 June – At least 15 people were killed and dozens injured after a suicide bombing that targeted a mosque and a video club in Djakana, Cameroon.

==== July ====
- 4 July – Two people were injured when Nigerian troops shot and killed three female suicide bombers who were targeting internally displaced persons in Monguno. The injuries came as a result of one of the suicide bomber's vest exploding.
- 8 July – At least 9 people were killed and "dozens" injured after a suicide bombing attack on a Mosque in Borno. There was also a second suicide bombing at another mosque.
- 9 July – Boko Haram militants raided a town with guns and explosives, killing 7 people and damaging buildings.
- 12 July – A Boko Haram attack in Borno was repelled by the Nigerian Army resulting in the deaths of 25 militants. Two soldiers were killed during the attack.

==== August ====
- 1 August – 13 Christian villagers were killed by Muslim terrorists, who also burned three churches.
- 10 August – Boko Haram militants burned 60 houses, shot four villagers dead, and abducted a child.
- 19 August – The Nigerian military claimed Abubakar Shekau (leader of Boko Haram) was fatally wounded and about 300 militants including three senior Boko Haram commanders (Abubakar Mubi, Malam Nuhu and Malam Hamman) killed in an air raid on the village of Taye in Borno State.
- 20 August – Boko Haram killed seven people with machine guns, before abducting dozens more, in the village of Kuruburu.
- 21 August
  - A Boko Haram attack on a village called Kuburvwa (between Chibok and Damboa) was reported to have left at least 11 people dead. Women were raped.
  - At least three people were killed and another 24 were injured by a suicide bombing attack at a market in the city of Mora, Far North, Cameroon.
- 27 August – A land mine planted by Islamist group Boko Haram killed four Chadian soldiers on patrol near Chad's border with Niger, security sources said.

==== September ====
- 4 September – Camel-riding assailants killed five people and wounded several more before being repelled by local militias. Houses were also burned.
- 14 September – At least 30 Boko Haram militants and five Niger Armed Forces soldiers are killed in clashes near the village of Toumour in Niger's southeast Diffa Region.
- 17 September – Chad and Nigerien soldiers killed at least 38 insurgents from terrorist group Boko Haram in Niger. Two soldiers were also injured in the operation.
- 18 September – The Nigerian Army has dispelled reports that 8 people were killed in an attack by Boko Haram fighters in Borno state.
- 19 September – Members of Boko Haram said that they killed 40 Nigerian soldiers battling in Malam Fatori.
- 22 September – Three civilians were killed in Cameroon's Far North in Djakana when a vigilante tried to stop a suicide bomber whose explosive device detonated.
- 25 September
  - Four soldiers and civilian JTF members were killed in the Borno towns Miyanti and Dareljam in an ambush on the army by the insurgents.
  - Boko Haram members attacked a Chad National Army position near the border with Niger. They killed four soldiers and injured six others. Seven terrorists were killed.
  - The Nigerian Army lost an officer and three soldiers to a landmine and ambush by Boko Haram.
- 26 September – The Nigerian Army suffered fresh setbacks in the fight against terrorists and gunmen with several soldiers and support staff killed during separate incidents in Borno and Kaduna States.

==== October ====
- 11 October – Five people were killed in an attack by suspected members of the Boko Haram on a village in Borno.
- 12 October – October 2016 Maiduguri bombings – 18 people were reported killed in an explosion in Maiduguri.
- 17 October – Boko Haram said it killed 20 soldiers in northeastern Nigeria.
- 24 October – Two suicide bombers killed three people in Cameroon. The first of those actions was carried out by a woman causing wounds to five people in Far North. The other attack was carried out in the northern locality of Waramide and three people were killed.
- 29 October – October 2016 Maiduguri bombings – Two suicide bombers killed at least eight people in Maiduguri.

==== November ====
- 1 November – Nine civilians were killed when a car bomb exploded near a military checkpoint in Gubio, Borno.
- 5 November – An army officer and six soldiers were killed by Boko Haram militants in a gun battle in Borno.
- 8 November
  - A gunman killed more than 30 gold miners in a remote area of northern Nigeria in Maru, Zamfara State.
  - Four people were killed and six others injured when two suicide bombers detonated an improvised explosive device in Maiduguri.
  - At least five Nigerien soldiers were killed and three others injured in a terrorist attack in Banibagou, Niger.
  - Two civilians were killed, three soldiers injured and 100 houses were set on fire when Boko Haram fighters raided a village in Far North, Cameroon.
- 11 November – Two persons were killed today in an early morning bomb blast in the Umulari area of Maiduguri.
- 12 November – 240 Boko Haram fighters surrendered in south-west Chad.
- 16 November – One other soldier died and eight others were injured in the Boko Haram ambush that led to the death of B.U. Umar, a lieutenant colonel.
- 18 November – Boko Haram suicide bombers killed six people, injuring many more in multiple bomb blasts.
- 22 November – Six soldiers were killed in an attack on a military base, while the surrounding houses were burned. On the other hand, a woman with explosives tried to enter an army post next to the Kolofata camp on Monday, but was shot down.
- 23 November – At least two persons were killed in a suicide bomb attack in Maiduguri.
- 24 November – Two young female suicide bombers attacked a town in Cameroon's Far North. One of the bombs exploded in Mora, killing the girl and wounding at least four people. Locals killed the second bomber before her device detonated.
- 28 November – Soldiers killed at least 30 insurgents from terrorist group Boko Haram.

==== December ====
- 9 December – 2016 Madagali bombings – Two explosions in Madagali, Adamawa, killed 57 people and injured 177 others.
- 11 December – 3 people were killed in two suicide bombing attacks in Maiduguri.
- 13 December – Boko Haram militants attacked a military base in Borno village Kamuya, leaving scores dead.
- 17 December – A member of the civilian Joint Task Force (JTF) was injured during operations in Sambisa Forest against Boko Haram.
- 23 December – President Muhammadu Buhari said that The Nigerian Army had driven Boko Haram militants from the last camp in their Sambisa Forest stronghold and that the terrorists are on the run.
- 25 December – A suicide bombing attack left at least two people dead and injured 5 others in Mora, Far North, Cameroon.
- 26 December – Two suicide bombers struck in Maiduguri. Only one of the attackers was said to have died, as the other was reportedly captured before striking.
- 28 December – 31 Boko Haram fighters surrendered in southern Niger.

=== 2017 ===
==== January ====
- 4 January – Three girl suicide bombers were killed while attempting to detonate their vests at market in Madagali. Local officials blamed Boko Haram for the attempted attack.
- 7 January – Boko Haram attacked a Nigerian Army base in Buni Yadi, Yobe, killing at least five soldiers. Fifteen Boko Haram militants were also killed after the army launched retaliatory strikes, a military source said.
- 7–8 January – Boko Haram clashed with government troops resulting in the deaths of five government soldiers and 15 terrorists.
- 10 January – Two female bombers killed three people, alongside themselves, when they went to the residences in the Kalari area, after disguising themselves as visitors.
- 13 January – Three Nigerian soldiers were killed and 27 others injured as troops fought off an attack on their position by Boko Haram militants in Kangarwa village, Borno. Ten Boko Haram militants were also killed in the attack. Another four suicide bombers killed at least nine people Madagali town, including themselves.
- 14 January
  - Two soldiers were killed in Borno in a roadside bombing.
  - 3 soldiers were killed by Boko Haram. 10 attackers were also killed in Borno.
  - At least 17 people were killed by Boko Haram militants in Gnam-Gnam, Far North, Cameroon.
- 16 January – Two teenage suicide bombers exploded at the University of Maiduguri, killing three people, including a professor.
- 17 January – Rann bombing – The Air Force mistakenly bombed an internally displaced persons camp in Rann, Borno killing 115 people and injuring between 100 and 200.
- 21 January – Boko Haram killed two soldiers and wounded seven others in an attack on a military base in southeastern Niger.
- 23 January – Boko Haram invaded a village, killed eight people and abducted an unspecified number of women and children in Borno.
- 25 January
  - A suicide bomb attack in Borno killed three people and wounded two others.
  - Boko Haram killed four people in multiple suicide bombing attacks in Maiduguri.
- 29 January – Boko Haram attacked a convoy of motorists along a recently secured highway in Borno, killing at least seven people and injuring many others.
- 30 January
  - Fifteen people were killed by Boko Haram militants in Maiduguri.
  - A man was killed and three others injured in a Boko Haram attack in Fotokol, Far North Region, Cameroon.
- 31 January – A suicide bomber stormed the Dalori quarters mosque in Maiduguri during morning prayers, killing one of their members.

==== February ====
- 1 February – A suspected Boko Haram attack along Cameroon's border with Nigeria killed a U.N. independent contractor and four others.
- 7 February
  - Two attempted suicide attack were foiled. The two attackers were arrested.
  - A security personnel and a civilian were killed in a Boko Haram attack.
- 11 February
  - 7 soldiers were killed and 19 injured in Boko Haram ambush in Borno.
  - Boko Haram invaded a village in Borno and set ablaze dozens of residential houses and a man suspected to were trapped in the attack.
- 13 February – Boko Haram invaded Mifa community in Chibok Local Government Area of Borno, killing an Islamic scholar and breaking the hands of a boy.
- 17 February – Two civilians were killed by a suicide bombing. The other eight attackers were killed by the police.

==== March ====
- 13 March – Three Nigerian men were killed by Boko Haram militants. The three men were accused of being Nigerian military spies.
- 18 March – Six people were killed in a suicide bombing in Maiduguri.
- 22 March – March 2017 Maiduguri bombings
- 30 March – Boko Haram Islamists abducted 22 girls and women in two separate raids in northeastern Nigeria.

==== April ====
- 2 April – The Nigerian military launched an offensive against Boko Haram.

==== May ====
- 5 May
  - Nine Chadian soldiers were killed in a Boko Haram attack on an army post in the Lake Chad region. Some 40 Boko Haram militants were also killed as the army responded to the attack on the Kaiga post, sources said.
  - Five people are dead in northeast Nigeria in Maiduguri in an attack by two female suicide bombers.
- 13 May – One person was killed and another injured by suicide bombers at the University of Maiduguri in northeastern Nigeria.
- 15 May – Nine members of the insurgent group arrived on motorcycles in Amarwa, a suburb of Maiduguri, and killed 11 farmers in their fields with machetes before escaping.
- 16 May – Three female suicide bombers have attacked a herding community in northeast Nigeria, killing two people and injuring seven others.
- 19 May – Three suicide bombers on Friday detonated explosives inside a university campus in Nigeria's northeastern state. The incident took place in Maiduguri city of Borno state.
- 20 May – At least 7 people are dead and more than 40 injured from gunshots in separate attacks by Boko haram militant group rampaging within recently liberated Borno communities.

==== June ====
- 2 June – 4 people are dead after two suicide bombers attacked a camp for those displaced by Boko Haram extremist violence in the region.
- 8 June – At least fourteen persons were killed and 24 were injured as Boko Haram suicide bombers staged multiple attacks targeting mosques where Muslim worshippers were praying. The attack occurred while soldiers were trying to repel another group of Boko Haram fighters, who were trying to invade the city.
- 9 June
  - Two teenagers were killed, all boys, and three others injured when a bomb concealed in a polythene bag exploded.
  - A soldier was killed when a female suicide bomber detonated her explosive vest in a military base.
- 10 June – Ten members of the Nigerian jihadist group raided the village of Hambagba, near Gwoza, on the Cameroon border, kidnapping six people and killing four others.
- 14 June – Boko Haram raided the villages of Komdi and Tuyan, near Chibok, kidnapping six people and killing ten others.
- 16 June – Two civilians were killed in an attack by a Boko Haram suicide bomber in the Far North Region.
- 18 June – At least 12 people have died and 11 others have been wounded in attacks by five suicide women in the Nigerian state of Borno, in the northeast of the country.
- 20 June – Suspected Boko Haram militants killed two people and wounded six others in an ambush on a police convoy in northeast Nigeria's Borno state.
- 22 June – A double suicide attack killed six civilians on Wednesday in Cameroon's restive Far North.
- 26 June – Suicide bombers killed nine people and wounded 13 others in multiple blasts in northeast Nigeria's Maiduguri.
- 29 June – Suicide bombers killed two people and wounded ten others in two blasts in a refugee camp near the city of Diffa, in Niger.
- 30 June – A civilian was killed when two Boko Haram suicide bombers blew themselves up in the city of Kerawa, in Niger.

==== July ====
- 1 July – A civilian was killed when four Boko Haram suicide bombers blew themselves up in the city of Mora, in Cameroon.
- 3 July
  - Boko Haram Islamist militants killed nine people and abducted dozens more in southern Niger.
  - A suicide bomber exploded his bomb in the middle of a group of people, killing four in Homaka, a locality in the Mora subdivision of the Far North region.
- 11 July
  - Boko Haram have publicly executed eight villagers in northeast Nigeria who opposed the enforcement of its hardline form of Islam.
  - Four Boko Haram suicide bombers killed 19 people and injured 23 in the northeast Nigerian city of Maiduguri.
- 17 July – Three Boko Haram female suicide bombers killed 8 people and injured 15 in the city of Maiduguri, in Borno State.
- 23 July – At least eight people are dead after female suicide bombers attacked two displaced persons camps in Maiduguri.
- 26 July
  - Two gendarmes were killed and several others injured during a Boko Haram attack in the Far North Region near the Nigerian border.
  - Suspected Boko Haram militants ambushed an exploration team working for the Nigerian National Petroleum Corporation, killing more than fifty people.
- 28 July – One civilian and four Boko Haram terrorists have been killed in a bomb attack in Meme.
- 29 July – 14 people were killed and 15 others were injured when two suicide bombers blew up themselves in Dikwa, Nigeria.

==== August ====
- 4 August – Three suicide bombers detonated explosives at the Simari area of Maiduguri, the Borno state capital, killing themselves and wounding two members of the civilian joint task force.
- 6 August – A suicide bomber killed at least seven people in a small town in northern Cameroon near the Nigerian border.
- 7 August – At least 31 fishermen were killed by Boko Haram jihadists in two separate attacks on islands in Lake Chad in northeastern Nigeria.
- 13 August
  - Boko Haram gunmen have killed four people and torched homes in a nighttime raid on a village in restive northeastern Nigeria.
  - Two tractor drivers were killed by Boko Haram insurgents in Jere Local Government Area of Borno.
- 15 August – A woman bomber blew herself up and killed 27 others at a market in the village of Konduga near Maiduguri.
- 20 August – Two persons were confirmed dead while three others seriously injured following an ambush by suspected Boko Haram terrorists along Damaturu, Biu road.
- 23 August
  - A least four people died and eight others were injured when two terrorists attacked Maiduguri.
  - Boko Haram extremists killed at least 27 people by shooting them and slitting their throats as they attacked several villages in northern Nigeria's Borno state.
- 25 August – Suspected Boko Haram militants sprayed a village in remote Cameroon with automatic fire, killing 15 people and kidnapping eight others in an overnight raid near the Nigerian border.
- 30 August – A person was killed, two others were injured and nine were kidnapped in coordinated attacks carried out by Boko Haram militants.

==== September ====
- 3 September – Boko Haram insurgents attacked an IDP camp in Borno State, killing eleven people and injuring three persons while also kidnaping four before fleeing. The attackers used swords and sharp knives to carry out the acts.
- 5 September – Boko Haram members killed four farmers in a drive-by shooting in Borno state in Nigeria's volatile northeast.
- 6–7 September – Boko Haram jihadists killed eight people in a series of raids on farming communities in northeast Nigeria.
- 8 September
  - Two female suicide bombers died in Maiduguri while eight other commuters close to the explosions received various degrees of injuries.
  - At least seven people were killed when Boko Haram jihadists attacked a camp for people displaced by the conflict in northeast Nigeria.
- 13 September – A young woman blew herself up in Cameroon's far north, killing four people and injuring another.
- 17 September – A village chief imam and four others were slaughtered by suspected Boko Haram members in Borno State.
- 18 September – At least 15 people have been killed and 43 others injured in a suicide attack on Mashimari village in Borno state.
- 26 September – A female suicide bomber killed five people when she blew herself up in a mosque in northeast Nigeria. Three other worshippers were injured in the attack.
- 27 September – Two Cameroonian soldiers were killed when a convoy of civilian vehicles hit landmines in northeast Nigeria.

==== October ====
- 22 October – A suicide bomber kills 13 people and injures five others in the northeast Nigerian city of Maiduguri. According to the police, 13 more civilians were injured in separate attacks.
- 30 October
  - 11 civilians were killed by Boko Haram terrorists in Kolofata, Cameroon.
  - Five civilians were killed and several other were Boko Haram terrorist blew himself up in a mosque in Maiduguri, Nigeria.
  - Four people, including a mother and her two children, were killed and nine others were injured when a vehicle hit a mine planted by Boko Haram terrorists in Banki, Nigeria.

==== November ====
- 1 November – Six people were killed and two wounded by a Boko Haram suicide attack on a mosque in the village of Zamga.
- 15 November – At least ten people have been killed and dozens injured in a suicide attack in a popular market in Maiduguri.
- 20 November – At least six farmers were beheaded in Borno State, Nigeria by Boko Haram terrorists.
- 21 November – 2017 Mubi bombing – 50 people were killed in a suicide attack in the north of Nigeria caused by Boko Haram militants.

==== December ====
- 2 December – Fifteen persons were killed and 53 others injured in twin suicide bomb attacks in a market in Borno State.
- 11 December – Two civilians and the bomber were killed when suicide bombing attacked a mosque after morning prayers in far northern Cameroon.
- 13 December – Five people were killed by Boko Haram militants in Damboa, Nigeria.
- 22–23 December – Three people were killed in two attacks in northern Cameroon by Boko Haram militants.
- 25 December – Boko Haram killed four people near Maiduguri.
- 28 December – A suicide bombing caused by a Boko Haram militant in Borno State killed at least six people and injured 13 others.
- 30 December – Boko Haram fighters opened fire on a group of loggers in a remote village in northeast Nigeria, killing 25 people. The gunmen also burned three vehicles laden with firewood heading to Maiduguri.
- 31 December – At least two people were killed and 30 more were injured in an attack by Boko Haram militants in northern Cameroon.

=== 2018 ===
==== January ====
- 1 January – At least three people were killed in a blast in Madagali.
- 3 January – 14 civilians were killed when a suspected Boko Haram militant blew himself up at a mosque in Gamboru, Borno. Only the muezzin has survived.
- 8 January
  - At least one civilian was killed in an attack by members of the terror group Boko Haram in Cameroon's Far North region.
  - Gunmen on motorbikes opened fire on a group of loggers collecting firewood at Kaje village, near the Borno state capital, Maiduguri. 20 People were killed in the attack and 15 others are missing and presumed kidnapped by the attackers.
- 10 January – At least three people were killed in an attack in Cameroon's Far North region.
- 11 January
  - Two suicide bombers, alleged members of the Islamist group Boko Haram, detonated their bombs in the Ouro-Kessoum district of Amchide in Cameroon, injuring two others.
  - Four people were killed and two others kidnapped in separate overnight attacks in the far north of Cameroon. Another one was wounded.
- 15 January
  - Four people were killed in Mayo-Tsanaga, a region of the Far North of Cameroon, during an attack by Boko Haram. The assailants left after burning down dozens of huts and a church.
  - Six people were killed by gunmen who also abducted five girls who joined the loggers to collect firewood from the Jinene woods.
  - Five people, including two suspected fighters of the terror group Boko Haram, were killed in an attack near Nigeria's northeastern town of Madagali. Two others were critically injured.
- 16 January – At least two civilians were killed and a dozen others injured in a suicide attack near a mosque in the Far North Region.
- 17 January
  - Two suspected Boko Haram suicide bombers killed 12 people and injured 65 others in an attack in the northeastern Nigerian city of Maiduguri.
  - Suspected Boko Haram fighters killed at least seven soldiers in an attack on a military post in Niger's southeastern Diffa Region. Ten others were injured in the attack.
- 18 January – Boko Haram jihadists have killed five people in an attack on a village in Adamawa state, northeast Nigeria.
- 26 January – At least three people were killed when Boko Haram attacked the Hyambula village in northeast Adamawa state. Five others were injured in the attack.
- 29 January – At least two soldiers were killed overnight while fighting off an attack by suspected Boko Haram jihadists in southeast Niger.
- 30 January – Boko Haram jihadists killed at least five loggers in northeast Nigeria. Four others were injured in the attack.
- 31 January – Four people were killed and 44 others sustained injuries in multiple suicide bomb attacks at a Konduga community and the Dalori Internally Displaced Persons camp.

==== February ====
- 3 February – At least two civilians were killed in an attack by the terror group Boko Haram in Kolofata of Cameroon's Far North region.
- 4 February
  - Boko Haram fighters stormed a village in northeast Nigeria and killed three people. Seven others were injured in the attack.
  - One person has been reported dead after Boko Haram terrorists attacked Kala village, opposite the Internally Displaced Persons (IDPs) camp in Dalori, Borno State. The attackers also injured another man during the attack and burnt down some houses.
  - Six people were killed and two others injured in the Cameroonian town of Hitawa (Far North), following an attack by Boko Haram.
- 16 February – 2018 Konduga bombings – At least 21 persons were killed and 70 civilians injured as three bombers struck Konduga local government area of Borno State.
- 19 February – Dapchi schoolgirls kidnapping – About 110 girls were abducted by Boko Haram from their school in Dapchi, Nigeria.
- 20 February – At least six people were killed and five others injured in a Boko Haram attack in the department of Mayo Tsanaga in Cameroon's Far North region.
- 21 February – Two soldiers, including a captain, were killed in a Boko Haram ambush in the Lake Chad region of Chad.
- 22 February – Boko Haram terrorists killed six people in different attacks in Cameroon's Far North region.
- 25 February – At least four people were killed in two suicide bombings by Boko Haram in the localities of Bourvare and Goumouldi, in the north of Cameroon. Half a dozen others were injured in the attacks.
- 27 February – Two soldiers were killed and two others wounded when a suicide bomber drove into their patrol vehicle in the Lake Chad region of Nigeria.

==== March ====
- 1 March
  - Boko Haram threatens to harm Leah Sharibu, Presidency Says; Condemns Killing Of Red Cross staff Boko Haram insurgents abducted three people from Madagali Local Government Area of Adamawa state.
  - Boko Haram militants killed at least 11 people including three aid workers in an attack on a military barracks in the town of Rann in Borno. Another three aid workers were wounded and one more kidnapped.
- 2 March – A female suicide bomber blew up herself at a mosque in the Fulatari area of Buni Yadi, Gujba local government area of Yobe, killing seven persons and injuring 28 others.
- 5 March
  - Insurgents attacked two farmers on their farm and slit their throats in the village of Gudda in Mafa Local Government Area of Borno.
  - A team of loggers were attacked by Boko Haram while on their way to the bush to collect firewood in the state of Borno. Three loggers were killed in the attack, while the rest fled to Dikwa and left behind a pickup van.
  - A suicide bomber on a bicycle killed three people when he detonated his explosives on the outskirts of Maiduguri.
- 6 March
  - Four loggers were killed when they stepped on a landmine left by Boko Haram near Dikwa, Borno.
  - Three people were killed in an attack in Gamboru on the border with Cameroon.
- 30 March – At least five people, including four suicide bombers, were killed and 13 others injured when terrorists attacked Muna Zawuya in the Mafa Local Government Area of Borno.

==== April ====
- 1 April
  - Terrorists attacked a village in the town of Limani near the border with Nigeria in northern Cameroon, killing one person and burning several huts.
  - Boko Haram militants attacked a military post in the commune of Waza in northern Cameroon, injuring a soldier. Two suicide bombers who blew themselves up died.
  - Boko Haram fighters attacked a military base and two surrounding villages near the Nigerian city of Maiduguri in the Jere Local Government Area, killing at least 20 people and wounding 84.
- 2 April – Five Cameroonian soldiers were killed and three others wounded in an attack on a military post in Sagmé in the commune of Fotokol in the Far North region of Cameroon.
- 22 April – Boko Haram jihadists shot dead 18 forest workers who had been collecting firewood in Borno State, near the town of Gamboru, on the border with Cameroon. In another incident, a vehicle carrying civilians travelling in a nearby army convoy hit a mine placed by insurgents, killing three people and wounding eleven others near the village of Wumbi.
- 26 April – Six people, including three civilians, a member of the Civilian Joint Task Force and two suicide bombers, were killed and nine others injured in an attack by Boko Haram insurgents in the Nigerian city of Maiduguri. Later another suicide bomber attacked an armored van of the Federal Special Anti-Robbery Squad in the same area, injuring two police officers.
- 27 April – Boko Haram terrorists attacked a village near Amchide in the Mayo-Sava department in Cameroon' s Far North region, killing a man and stealing sheep.
- 29 April – At least three soldiers were killed in an attack by Boko Haram militants in the Diffa region in southeast Niger.

==== May ====
- 1 May – 2018 Mubi suicide bombings – At least 86 people were killed in two suicide attacks at a mosque and a market in Mubi, a town in Adamawa. 58 others were injured in the bombings.
- 2 May – Boko Haram militants attacked the village of Auno in the Konduga local government area. There were no deaths, but a vehicle was burned by the terrorists.
- 3 May
  - At least four people were killed and nine others injured when four suicide bombers attacked Mainari Shuwa and neighbouring Mainari Kanuri in the Konduga local government area of Borno.
  - At least twenty huts were set on fire and a man was killed in the Mayo-Sava department in the Far North region of Cameroon.
- 5 May – At least 12 people were killed, while 20 others were injured when two suicide bombers detonated their explosives at a mosque in Mabanda in the Far North region of Cameroon.
- 6 May – Six people, including four government officials and a soldier, were killed in an attack by Boko Haram jihadists on a Chadian Army checkpoint on an island in Lake Chad.
- 17 May – At least four people were killed and 15 others injured in a suicide bombing at an open-air mosque for refugees in Dikwa in Borno.
- 27 May – At least three people were killed and seven others injured when two suicide bombers attacked a community in the Konduga Local government area in Borno.
- 28 May – At least one person was killed and an unconfirmed number of cattle were stolen in an attack on herders by Boko Haram terrorists in the Askira/Uba Local Government Area in the southern part of Borno.
- 31 May – Five soldiers were killed in an ambush by Boko Haram terrorists in the Gwoza Local Government Area of Borno.

==== June ====
- 4 June – Three suicide bombers, two women and a man, blew themselves up in Diffa in southeast Niger. The first explosion took place near a mosque, the second near a Koran school and the third not far from a business centre. Nine people were killed and 38 others injured in the attacks.
- 8 June – At least 10 people were killed in attacks in villages in the department of Diamaré in Far North, Cameroon. Four Boko Haram terrorists were also killed.
- 9 June – A suicide bomber detonated a bomb attached to his body, killing only himself, in Maiduguri.
- 11 June – At least two people were killed and four others injured when a Boko Haram suicide bomber detonated his explosives in Maiduguri.
- 13 June – A trader was killed by Boko Haram terrorists armed with machetes and firearms in the village of Alhadjiri in the department of Mayo-Sava in Cameroon's Far North.
- 16 June
  - Two suicide bombers were killed when one of them prematurely activated her explosive device in the town of Limani in Far North, Cameroon. A young boy was also killed in the explosion.
  - Two people were killed by terrorists in the village of Tchika in the commune of Hile-Alifa in northern Cameroon.
  - At least 43 people were killed and 84 others injured when six female suicide bombers detonated their explosives in the Damboa local government area.
- 18 June – Boko Haram militants killed nine soldiers and wounded two others when they attacked the town of Gajiram, headquarters of the local government of Nganzai in Borno.
- 20 June – Fifteen people were injured when two suicide bombers attacked barracks in Maiduguri.
- 22–23 June – Boko Haram terrorists attacked the locality of Guid-Zeleved in Far North, Cameroon, slaughtering three people.
- 26 June
  - Three civilians were killed and a woman abducted in an incursion led by a group of armed persons in Oulfo on the border between Cameroon and Nigeria in the Far North region of Cameroon.
  - At least seven people were killed while dozens sustained injuries when Boko Haram militants attacked them at a village in the local government area of Damboa.
- 30 June – Boko Haram jihadists killed four people and injured four others during an attack on a camp for displaced civilians in Banki in the local government area of Bama in Borno. Two terrorists were also killed in the fight and the others fled. Later, two soldiers were wounded when their patrol vehicle hit a landmine planted by the fleeing jihadists in the village of Freetown, nine kilometers away.

==== July ====
- 20 July – Insurgents swarmed 81 Division Task Force Brigade in Jilli, near Geidam, Yobe. Three Nigerian Army officers and 28 soldiers were confirmed killed.

==== September ====
- 8 September – ISWAP captured the town of Gudumbali.

==== October ====
- 8 October – Boko Haram attack leaves 15 soldiers dead in attacks near the Niger Border and around the Lake Chad
- 31 October – Boko Haram killed 15 people in the villages of Kofa, Dalori, and Bulabrin.

==== November ====
- 22 November – Insurgents overran a Nigerian Army battalion at Metele village in Guzamala Local government in Borno, killing 70 soldiers

=== 2019 ===
==== June ====
- 17 June – 2019 Konduga bombings – Three suicide bombers detonated near a group of people watching a football game, killing 30 and wounding over 40.

==== July ====
- 2 July – Boko Haram attacked the village of Inates in Tillabéri Region, Niger, using a suicide vest and guns. The attack killed 18 soldiers and another 4 soldiers were captured.
- 4 July – Boko Haram attacked soldiers near the village of Damboa, killing five. Another 14 soldiers and two civilians were also wounded.
- 18 July – ISWAP ambushed a military vehicle on a road near Jakana, killing all six soldiers on board.
- 19 July – Six aid workers were kidnapped and a driver killed when militants stopped their vehicle in northeast Nigeria.
- 27 July – 2019 Nganzai funeral attack – Militants opened fire on a group of people walking home from a funeral in Nganzai District, Borno. At least 65 people were killed in the attack, many of them while attempting to chase the militants away. A local government chairmen said the attack happened because a civilian defense group had killed 11 of the militants during an ambush last week.

==== August ====
- 5 August – ISWAP insurgents raided Monguno, with the resulting clash with troops leaving three civilians dead.
- 6 August – Two female suicide bombers struck a crowd of women collecting firewood in Mafa, Borno, killing three civilians and wounding eight more.
- 14 August – In Lac Province, western Chad, a female suicide bomber activated her explosives at the home of a traditional chieftain, killing four guards, a soldier, and a civilian and wounding five others. Boko Haram or ISWAP militants are suspected of carrying out the attack.
- 15 August – Boko Haram clashed with the Nigerian military near Maiduguri killing three soldiers.
- 18 August – Militants killed four soldiers when they fired on a military patrol in a village in east Borno.
- 23 August – Twelve villagers were killed in Gueskerou, southeastern Niger, after a raid by Boko Haram militants.
- 26 August – Militants killed four civilians and abducted 12 more in a village in Borno.
- 27 August – ISWAP insurgents killed 11 construction workers and wounded several more in Wajirko village in Borno.
- 30 August – ISWAP insurgents killed eight soldiers in the Gasarwa area near Lake Chad in Borno.
- 31 August – Boko Haram militants stormed the Borno State village of Balumri, killing four and kidnapping six. Four of those kidnapped were later beheaded.

==== September ====
- 9 September – ISWAP militants ambushed a Nigerian military convoy as it traveled to reinforce coalition troops outside the ISWAP-held town of Gudumbali. The number of casualties was "huge," but no number or range was specified.
- 13 September – Insurgents killed six Cameroonian soldiers and wounded nine more in an attack on a military base in Fotokol, Far North, Cameroon.
- 25 September – ISWAP executed one of the six aid workers the group had captured and held hostage in July.
- 26 September – An ISWAP ambush on a military convoy outside the town of Gubio left at least seven Nigerian soldiers dead.
- 27 September – Nigerian and Chadian troops were attacked by ISWAP in Gajiram, leaving a policeman, a hunter, and six civilians dead. A militant pickup truck was destroyed in the battle, killing several of the extremists on board.
- 28 September – Boko Haram fighters killed a soldier and destroyed a Nigerian military vehicle in Banki, near Cameroon. One other person was killed and several more were injured when Boko Haram militants stormed two villages near Kolofata, Cameroon.

==== December ====
- 2 December – ISWAP insurgents killed four Chadian soldiers in an attack on their positions along the shores of Lake Chad.
- 10 December – Battle of Inates
- 12 December – ISWAP fighters killed 14 militiamen and a police officer in northeast Nigeria.
- 13 December – ISWAP executed four of the six aid workers it has held hostage since capturing them in July. A fifth had been executed in September, while only one Action Against Hunger staff member remains alive.
- 14 December – Boko Haram militants killed 19 Fulani cattle herders near Ngala, along the border with Cameroon, after the herders repelled an attack on a village earlier, leaving one militant dead.
- 17 December – At least 14 people were killed, five were injured, and 13 more were missing, after Boko Haram militants attacked the Lake Chad fishing village of Kaiga, Chad.
- 22 December – ISWAP militants killed six people and abducted five others, including two aid workers, when they set up a fake checkpoint on a highway near Maiduguri.
- 24 December – Boko Haram militants killed seven people in a raid near Chibok, a Christian town in Borno, on Christmas Eve. They also abducted a teenage girl.
- 26 December – ISWAP militants killed 11 Christians, who were kidnapped from Maiduguri and Damaturu, in a video released one day after Christmas. The militants said the execution was in response to the death of Islamic State leader Abu Bakr al-Baghdadi.

=== 2020 ===
==== January ====
- 3 January – Local sources reported that 50 people may have been killed in an attack by Boko Haram on an island in Lake Chad in late December.
- 6 January – 2020 Gamboru bombing – At least 32 people were killed and over 35 injured when an IED explode on a crowded bridge in Gamboru, Borno.
- 7 January – Twenty soldiers were killed and more than 1,000 people displaced when a town in Borno was attacked by ISWAP militants.
- 16 January – Three aid workers and other civilians who were kidnapped on December 22 in northeast Nigeria were released by an unspecified militant group.
- 19 January – A suspected female Boko Haram suicide bomber detonated her explosives in Kaiga-Kindjiria, western Chad, killing nine civilians. It was also reported that insurgents killed four villagers and kidnapped four women around the same area earlier in the month, while 1,200 Chadian troops returned to Chad from Nigeria in order to defend Chadian territory.

==== February ====
- 7 February – Boko Haram militants killed six civilians in Bosso District, Diffa Region, Niger.
- 9 February – At least 30 civilians were killed and many more abducted by militants in Auno, Borno. Four soldiers were killed and seven more wounded in an attack on the same village last month.
- 15 February – Boko Haram attacked a military post in the town of Toumour, Niger. The attack was unsuccessful resulting in the deaths of 50 Boko Haram fighter and the injury of one Nigerien soldier. The Nigerien military also destroyed multiple vehicles belonging to Boko Haram.

==== March ====
- 4 March – Four police officers and two militiamen were killed by Boko Haram militants during a raid on an army base in Damboa.
- 17 March – The Niger Armed Forces said they killed 50 members of Boko Haram when the latter group attacked a military outpost in Toumour, Diffa Region.
- 23 March – March 2020 Chad and Nigeria massacres – At least 50 Nigerian soldiers were killed by Boko Haram militants in an ambush near a village in Yobe State, Nigeria. Other sources stated at many as 75 soldiers were killed.
- 24 March – March 2020 Chad and Nigeria massacres – At least 92 Chadian soldiers were killed and 24 army vehicles were destroyed by Boko Haram militants during a seven-hour long battle in the Boma peninsula in the Lake Chad region of Chad.
- 31 March – Operation Boma's Wrath was launched.

==== April ====
- 5 April – Two Boko Haram suicide bombers killed seven civilians and themselves in Amchide, Far North, Cameroon.
- 6 April – MNJTF troops attacked Boko Haram in the Lake Chad region killing 19 terrorists.
- 8 April – A spokesperson for Chad's army announced that a military operation, which began on March 31 against armed militants in the Lake Chad region, killed over 1,000 fighters and left 52 Chadian soldiers dead. Niger also participated in the operation.
- 9 April – President Idriss Déby of Chad said his country's troops will no longer engage in military operations abroad in order to focus on fighting militants and rebels at home. Chad is part of MNJTF, which focuses on fighting extremists in the Lake Chad region, and the G5 Sahel force, which focuses on fighting extremists in the Sahel region. Thousands of Chadian soldiers will withdraw from bases in Niger, Mali, and Nigeria by April 22.
- 16 April – At least 44 suspected Boko Haram militants were fatally poisoned while imprisoned in Chad. It was not clear how or why they were poisoned.

==== May ====
- 3 May – Militants attacked a military camp outside Niger's Diffa city, killing two soldiers and wounding three more.
- 5 May – An operation launched by Nigeria has killed 134 militants in northeast Nigeria since it began on 1 May.
- 11 May – Niger said it neutralized about 25 militants south of Diffa, Niger, and about 50 more in Nigeria's Lake Chad region. Only two soldiers were injured in the operations.
- 18 May – Twelve soldiers were killed and at least ten more wounded after Boko Haram militants attacked their outpost northeast of Diffa, Niger. Seven of the attackers were "neutralized".

==== June ====
- 9 June – An attack by ISWAP on the herding village of Gubio in Borno, left at least 81 people dead, seven people and over 1,200 cattle abducted, and the village destroyed. The attack may have been retaliation for the earlier killing of members of an armed militant group by local militiamen.
- 13 June – ISWAP conducted two attacks in the Monguno and Nganzai areas of Borno, killing at least 20 soldiers in the first location and at least 40 civilians in the second location. Hundreds of civilians were wounded and many buildings were torched in the violence, according to local sources.
- 27 June – Nine soldiers and two militia members were killed in a Boko Haram ambush.
- 28 June – Six Nigerian soldiers were killed in an attack on their positions by Boko Haram, who stole weapons in the attack.
- 29 June – Boko Haram ambushed and killed nine Nigerian soldiers in the town of Damboa.

==== July ====
- 2 July – Two civilians were killed and an aid helicopter damaged after militants raided Damasak, Borno.
- 7 July – An ambush conducted by ISWAP on a Nigerian military convoy at Bulabulin village, Borno, killed at least 35 soldiers and left more than 18 injured and 30 missing. The government claimed at least 17 insurgents were killed in the battle.
- 10 July – Boko Haram assaulted Baga and killed about 20 soldiers stationed there, and then opened fire on a military convoy near Gada Blu, killing 15 soldiers.
- 13 July – Militants killed eight soldiers while attacking a military convoy near Kumulla, Borno, and then killed another two soldiers during a firefight near Kolore village.
- 18 July – Gunmen attacked several villages near Chibok, killing three farmers.
- 22 July – Five aid workers were killed by armed men who had kidnapped them last month in Borno.
- 30 July – Three people were killed in a bombing in Maiduguri.

==== August ====
- 2 August – Boko Haram militants attacked an IDP camp in Far North, Cameroon, killing 16 people and wounding at least seven more.
- 9 August – ISWAP killed six French aid workers and two Nigerien civilians in Kouré, Tillabéri Region, Niger.

==== September ====
- 1 September – At least seven people were killed and more than 14 were wounded when a suicide bomber exploded in an IDP camp in Goldavi, Far North, Cameroon.
- 20 September – Boko Haram ambushed a convoy of Nigerian troops near Damboa, killing seven soldiers.
- 25 September – At least 30 people, including civilians and security personnel, were killed when militants attacked the convoy of a region governor near Baga, Borno.
- 30 September – 10 Nigerian soldiers were killed and eight more were wounded when militants attacked their logistics convoy near Marte, Borno.

==== October ====
- 25 October – Nigerian troops killed 22 Boko Haram militants in Damboa.
- 28 November – Koshebe massacre – About 110 civilians, mostly farm workers, were massacred by Boko Haram in Koshebe, Borno.

==== December ====
- 11 December – Kankara kidnapping – 344 schoolchildren from and all-male boarding school were kidnaped by Boko Haram.
- 13 December – Twenty-eight people were killed and 100 injured in the town of Toumour in Niger, Boko Haram then burned between 800 and 1,000 homes and the central market, up to 60% of the town was destroyed.
- 18 December – Thirty-five people were kidnapped and one person was killed along the Maiduguri-Damaturu Highway, three vehicles were also set on fire and nine other vehicles were abandoned along the road.
- 20 December – Five Nigerian soldiers were killed when Boko Haram fired a RPG at a vehicle in a convoy, two other vehicles were stolen by Boko Haram in the same attacks.
- 24 December
  - A mostly-Christian village in Borno State, northeastern Nigeria, was attacked on Christmas Eve. The jihadists arrived in trucks and on motorcycles, shooting at villagers. The insurgents killed at least seven people and kidnapped a priest. The militants burnt a church, a hospital and ten houses. They also looted food and medical supplies.
  - Forty loggers were kidnapped near the town of Gamboru, so far four of the loggers have been found dead.
- 27 December – Ten people were killed when Boko Haram attack on the villages of Shafa, Azare and Tashan Alade. Boko Haram burned homes, shops, churches, and a police station where two police officers were killed.
- 29 December – Eleven people were killed, seven pro-government hunters and four army personnel when their vehicle hit a landmine in the village of Kayamla.

=== 2021 ===
==== January ====
- 3 January – Multinational Joint Task Force carried a sweep around Kolofata, during the fighting three Boko Haram insurgents were killed and two were captured. Operation Tuka Takaibango was announced by the Nigerian military.
- 4 January – At around 4 am three members of a local vigilance committee were shot dead by Boko Haram in Mayo Moskota area. A civilian was killed by Boko Haram in Kolofata area the same morning.
- 6 January – Boko Haram infiltrated the town of Geidam, Yobe. Insurgents were sighted at the outskirts of Geidam at 1 pm. A rumour about insurgents spread through town soon and it caused regular activities to be disrupted for an hour and a half, after nothing happened people continued with their regular activities. Boko Haram insurgents gathered at strategic locations such as Geidam market with a coordinated plan at 5:30 PM, soon after they positioned at those locations they attacked the town. The insurgents abducted the District Head, injured several civilians and stole food and medical supplies. Police of the district later found two bodies in a burnt vehicle who they believe are members of Boko Haram.
- 7 January – Operation Tuka Takaibango was officially launched.
- 8 January – 14 people were killed when a Boko Haram suicide bomber detonated their explosives in the town of Mozogo, Cameroon.
- 9 January – At least 28 Boko Haram insurgents were killed during clashes with the Nigerian Army in Gujba, while several other insurgents escaped, one Nigerian soldier was killed and one was injured, according to the military spokesman of Nigeria.
- 11 January – 13 soldiers were killed when Islamic State West Africa Province militants ambushed a convoy in the village of Gazagana, Nigeria.
- 14 January – The Nigerian military announced that 64 Boko Haram insurgents were killed in multiple operations conducted on 9 and 10 January.
- 16 January – ISWAP militants attacked and destroyed a military base in the town of Marte, Borno, killing seven people. The militants also stole weapons, ammunition, and six vehicles.
- 17 January – Seven IEDs were activated against a Nigerian Army convoy of APCs and other vehicles, escorted by a foot patrol in Gorgi, Borno. Over 30 soldiers were killed. Three vehicles were destroyed, and an armored vehicle, weapons and ammunition were seized.
- 19 January – Four Nigerian soldiers were killed and eight other injured when their vehicle hit and IED.
- 22 January – ISWAP operatives ambushed and fired machine guns at a Nigerian Army patrol in Borno. Seven soldiers were killed and others were wounded. In addition, an ATV, weapons and ammunition were seized.
- 31 January – Two attacks took place in northern Nigeria. One in the village of Chabal, leaving 2 policemen dead and two abducted. The second attack occurred in Dikwa, resulting in the deaths of 2 soldiers and leaving two female police officers abducted.

==== February ====
- 5 February
  - It was reported that Nigerian troops backed by jets overran several camps of Boko Haram in the Timbuktu triangle, including the Dole camp. They also liberated Talala, which was seized in 2013 by militants and became their second largest camp, right behind the Lake Chad region. Besides Talala they also liberated Buk, Gorgi and overran camps in Kidari, Argude, Takwala, Chowalta and Galdekore.
  - Two high-profile ISWAP commanders, Modu Sulum and Ameer Modu Borzogo, fled along with some fighters during intense fighting but several other commanders and fighters have been killed and many abducted hostages were rescued.
  - ISWAP operatives ambushed Nigerian soldiers in the Goniri region, near the Nigeria-Niger border. The two sides exchanged fire. Six soldiers were killed and a few others were wounded. The other soldiers fled. ISIS operatives seized vehicles, weapons and ammunition.
- 7 February – 'Bandits' raided two villages in Kaduna State, leading to the deaths of 19 people, according to the Nigerian government.
- 8 February – ISWAP operatives attacked a Nigerian Army checkpoint in Monguno. There was an exchange of fire. Three soldiers were killed and several others were wounded. ISWAP operatives seized vehicles, weapons and ammunition.
- 9 February
  - A group of Nigerian soldiers was attacked between Jakana and Mainok, about 30 km west of Maiduguri. There was an exchange of fire. Seven soldiers were killed. In addition, two Nigerian army vehicles were destroyed. ISIS operatives seized weapons left at the site.
  - A Nigerian Army checkpoint was attacked in Geidam, Yobe, about 30 km from the Niger-Nigeria border. The sides exchanged fire. Four soldiers were killed, three were taken prisoner and the rest fled. ISIS operatives seized weapons left at the site and set fire to a Nigerian Army vehicle.
- 11 February – Nigerian soldiers were ambushed in the suburbs of Monguno. An IED was activated against the soldiers, followed by an exchange of fire. Three soldiers were killed and several others were wounded. The rest fled. ISIS operatives seized an ATV and weapons.
- 12 February – A force of a militia supporting the Nigerian Army was attacked in the village of Gur, about 150 km south of Maiduguri/. There was an exchange of fire. Four militia fighters were killed. The ISWAP operatives set fire to four vehicles and houses belonging to the fighters.
- 15 February – A Nigerian Army compound was attacked in Marte, about 40 km east of the Nigeria-Cameroon border, in northeastern Nigeria. Ten soldiers were killed in the exchange of fire and several others were wounded. The other soldiers fled. ISIS operatives set fire to the compound, two tanks and a Nigerian army vehicle. They also seized three vehicles, weapons and ammunition.
- 16 February
  - A group of Nigerian soldiers was attacked in a village in Borno. There was an exchange of fire. Four soldiers were killed and several others were wounded. The other soldiers fled. ISIS operatives seized weapons and ammunition.
  - Four policemen and seven civilians were killed during an ISWAP attack on the village of Bayamari Village in Yobe.
  - An attack was carried out against the headquarters of a militia supporting the Nigerian Army in Gubio. There was an exchange of fire. Three soldiers were killed and several others were wounded. The other soldiers fled. ISIS operatives seized weapons and ammunition and set fire to vehicles.
- 17 February – A Nigerian Army convoy was ambushed and targeted by gunfire in the Karito region, near Lake Chad. Three soldiers were killed and several others were wounded in the exchange of fire. ISIS operatives seized weapons and ammunition, and set fire to three vehicles.
- 19 February – An attack was carried out against a Nigerian Army camp in Dikwa, about 50 km from the Cameroon-Nigeria border in Borno. A total of 15 soldiers were killed in the exchange of fire and several others were wounded. The remaining soldiers fled, and ISIS operatives seized four vehicles, weapons and ammunition. ISIS operatives set fire to the camp and to other vehicles. The camp taken over by ISIS operatives is one of the largest Nigerian Army camps and that many residents left the area in the wake of the attack.
- 21 February – Boko Haram militants beheaded five people in an IDP camp in Borno.
- 23 February – 2021 Maiduguri rocket attacks - Boko Haram used rocket-propelled grenades to kill 10 people.
- 25 February – Gunmen on motorcycles stormed into several villages in Igabi and Chikun districts of Kaduna State, leaving at least 18 people dead.
- 26 February – A midnight attack on a secondary school in Zamfara resulted in at least 317 schoolgirls being kidnapped.
- 28 February – ISWAP ambushed the convoy of the Commandant of Nigeria's counter-insurgency operation, Farouq Yahaya, killing at least 2 soldiers.

==== March ====
- 1 March
  - ISWAP took over the town of Dikwa for several hours after forcing government forces out of the settlement. Whilst in Dikwa, the militants attacked a Nigerian Army base, killing six soldiers. They returned the next day, killing another two soldiers.
  - ISWAP took over the town of Bukarti, Yobe. IS militants also attacked a Nigerian Army convoy near Geidam, killing two Nigerian soldiers.
- 6 March – Boko Haram invaded Rumirgo community of Askira Uba local government area of Borno, causing the death of two civilians and a security personnel and carted away with a tanker vehicle loaded with petrol.
- 10 March
  - A series of attacks by 'gangs' occurred in Northern Nigeria leading to the deaths of 31 people.
  - ISWAP claimed an attack where in which at least 30 Nigerian soldiers were killed after two explosive-laden vehicles rammed into a Nigerian Army convoy in Wulgo, Borno State.
- 11 March – ISWAP operatives ambushed a Nigerian Army convoy near Gudumbali in the Lake Chad region, killing 15 Nigerian soldiers and 4 militia fighters. Of those killed, one was a local vigilante leader and another was the head of the local Civilian Joint Task Force.
- 12 March – ISWAP militants attacked a Nigerian Army checkpoint near Ngamdu. Six Nigerian soldiers were killed in the attack and several more were wounded. The remaining soldiers fled, leaving ATVs, weapons and ammunition.
- 14 March – IS's Amaq Agency released photos of an attack they conducted against Nigerian soldiers and special forces. At least 12 Nigerian Army personnel were killed in the attack and at least one was captured.
- 15 March – The Nigerian Army killed 41 Boko Haram militants during an anti-terror operation between Gulwa and Musuri villages in the northeastern part of the country. Four Nigerian soldiers were also killed in the operation.
- 18 March – ISWAP operatives attacked a Nigerian Army base in Damasak. Five Nigerian soldiers were killed and several others were wounded. IS operatives set fire to the HQ of the International Red Cross and two of its vehicles.
- 20 March – ISWAP forces attacked a Nigerian Army post in Wulgo. One Nigerian soldier was killed and several others were wounded. ISWAP militants stole weapons and ammunition.
- 21 March – ISWAP operatives attacked the town of Goniri near the Niger-Nigerian border. ISWAP operatives burned down several buildings and killed two militiamen during the attack.
- 24 March – Nigerian Army militia were attacked near the border with Cameroon. During the exchange of fire, one militiaman was killed and several others were wounded.
- 31 March – A Christian 'spy' was abducted and killed by ISWAP operatives in a village in the Askira region. ISWAP also activated an IED against a Nigerian army patrol in the Malam Fatori region, killing six Nigerian soldiers.

==== April ====
- 2 April – IS operatives targeted a Cameroonian Army camp on the Nigerian-Cameroonian border. Five Cameroonian soldiers were killed in the attack.
- 5 April – 11 Boko Haram militants were killed in a Nigerian Army operation in the Gwoza area of Borno.
- 8 April – 16 Chadian soldiers were killed after ISWAP operatives ambushed Chadian Army boats transporting soldiers over Lake Chad.
- 9 April – ISWAP militants attacked a majority Christian village near the border between Nigeria and Cameroon. During the attack, militants killed two civilians and abducted three others. They also burnt down several buildings, including three churches.
- 10 April
  - ISIL claimed responsibility night attack on the town of Damasak, killing six people including two soldiers.
  - Boko Haram militants killed three soldiers during a shootout in Maiduguri.
- 11 April – Seven ISWAP fighters were killed by the Nigerian Army on the road between Ngowum and Mafa, Borno.
- 12 April – ISWAP destroyed a Nigerian Army telecommunications tower, in Mandaragirau, Borno, using an IED.
- 17 April – ISWAP attacked the Kumuya military base of the 27 Task Force Brigade in Yobe, burning the camp and killing 10 soldiers and destroying a T-72, a 105mm howitzer, and Camel MRAP. 171 soldiers went missing after fleeing the attack. So far, 41 have returned.
- 23 April – ISWAP carried out a large-scale attack on the town of Geidam, and took the town over. During the attack several Nigerian soldiers and at least 11 civilians were killed. On April 25, the Nigerian Air Force killed around 20 militants.
- 25 April
  - Mainok attack – ISWAP militants, arriving in around 20 vehicles, killed at least 31 Nigerian soldiers after they ambushed a military convoy escorting weapons and overran a base in the town of Mainok outside the regional capital Maiduguri.
  - A Boko Haram attack in Chad left 12 soldiers dead.
- 28 April – ISWAP took control of Geidam, after killing at least 11 civilians.

==== May ====
- 4 May – 30 people were killed including five Nigerian soldiers and 15 militiamen, after ISWAP operatives stormed Ajiri town and raided a nearby military base.
- 5 May – Five civilians were killed after their car struck an ISWAP landmine at Tumshe village near Rann.
- 6 May – ISWAP operatives attacked a Nigerian Army position in Bulabulin, about 50 km southwest of Maiduguri. Eight soldiers were killed and several others were wounded in the exchange of fire. ISIS operatives set fire to the barracks, three tanks and artillery.
- 11 May – Five Boko Haram militants were killed after Nigerian forces repelled an attack on Maiduguri.
- 19–20 May – Battle of Sambisa Forest – ISWAP overran Boko Haram militants and eventually captured Sambisa Forest, Borno. Allegedly, the leader of Boko Haram, Abubakar Shekau either killed himself to escape capture by ISWAP or was seriously wounded.
- 29 May – 2021 Niger attacks – ISWAP attacked Diffa, in southern Niger near the border with Nigeria, killing at least four civilians and four Nigerien soldiers. Several ISWAP operatives were also 'neutralised'.

==== June ====
- 6 June – ISWAP operatives carried out an attack on the village of Kawaji, near Damboa. Seven Nigerian militiamen were killed in the attack. The ISWAP operatives took two fighters prisoner and later killed them. The operatives also set fire to a number of houses in the village belonging to the militiamen.
- 8 June – ISWAP released photos showing them killing two alleged spies in near the Niger-Nigeria border.
- 13 June – ISWAP militants attacked a Nigerian Army base near Maiduguri. Several Nigerian soldiers were killed or wounded in the fighting, whilst the rest fled the scene. The ISWAP militants then set fire to an armoured vehicle and seized four vehicles and several types of weapons and ammunition.
- 16 June – ISWAP attacked a Nigerian Army post near the city of Bama, Borno state sizing weapons, pickups, and two Vickers Main Battle Tank Mark 3. An unknown number of Nigerian soldiers were killed in the attack.
- 21 June – Nigerian troops of Operation Hadin Kai during an offensive attack around the Lake Chad region kill Amir Kennami, a high-profile ISWAP commander.
- 28 June
  - ISWAP released a video announcing that a large group of Boko Haram fighters had pledged allegiance to Islamic State.
  - ISWAP attacked a Nigerian Army post in the town of Banki, near the Cameroonian border, killing at least four Nigerian soldiers.

==== July ====
- 7 July – ISWAP raided communes in Adamawa, killing 24 civilians.
- 13 July – ISWAP attacked positions of militias supporting the Nigerian Army were attacked in Lambawa, southwest of Maiduguri, killing five militiamen and a Nigerian 'spy'.
- 15 July – ISWAP operatives attacked a Nigerian Army camp was attacked in Qawari, killing a soldier and capturing several pieces of equipment and weaponry.
- 17 July – Islamic State's Amaq News Agency released a new video showing combat footage and a shooting killing of six prisoners.
- 25 July – ISWAP attacked a Cameroonian Army in Zigi, in the Maroua region, killing at least seven Cameroonian soldiers.

==== August ====
- 5 August - At least 24 Chadian soldiers were killed and 14 more were wounded, in a suspected jihadist attack on Tchoukou Telia, an island 190 kilometres (118 miles) northwest of the capital N'Djamena. The area has been used by ISWAP as a base to launch its attacks.
- 26 August - Five Nigerian soldiers were killed by ISWAP during a rocket attack on a Nigerian military base in the Malam Fatori region.
- 30 August - Seventeen people, including a soldier and an aid worker, were killed after hundreds of ISWAP militants launched an attack on the town of Rann on the border with Cameroon.

==== September ====
- 15 September - A Nigerian Army convoy was ambushed by ISWAP forces between Manguno and Gajiram, leaving 25 Nigerian soldiers dead and several others wounded.
- 26 September - At least 22 Nigerian soldiers were killed when ISWAP militants launched an attack on Burkusuma military base in Sokoto. An unspecified number of ISWAP militants were killed in the attack.
- 26 September - Kwatar Daban Masara airstrike - 50-60 people were killed in an airstrike on a fish market in Kwatar Daban Masara, Borno.

==== October ====
- 22 October - A security advisor to the Nigerian president announced the killing of 'Malam Bako' one of the new leaders of ISWAP and another senior ISWAP operative.
- 23 October - 4 Nigerian soldiers were killed in two separate attacks conducted by ISWAP forces in the northeast of the country.
- 30 October - ISWAP released a video showing a group of senior ISWAP militants re-pledging their allegiance to IS Caliph Abu Ibrahim al-Hashimi al-Qurashi, combat footage and the execution of two captured Nigerian soldiers.

==== November ====
- 6 November - non-IS sources claimed that Sani Shuwaram had been appointed leading commander of ISWAP.
- 8 November - ISWAP forces attacked a Nigerian army convoy on the Ngamdu-Damaturu road in the northeastern part of the country, killing at least 3 Nigerian soldiers.
- 13 November - Nigerian Army Brigadier General Dzarma Zirkusu and three other Nigerian soldiers were killed in an ISWAP attack on Askira town in Borno State.

==== December ====
- 6 December - two Nigerian militiamen were killed by ISWAP gunmen after a shootout in the town of Mainok.
- 11 December - ISWAP forces attacked a convoy of 60 Nigerian army vehicles that were preparing to attack ISWAP territory in the north of the country. The attack left dozens of Nigerian soldiers killed and injured and several army vehicles were destroyed. Photos of the destroyed convoy were released on IS's Amaq News Agency.
- 14 December - 10 Nigerian soldiers were killed in an ISWAP attack on the village of Sabongari, Adamawa State. This is one of ISWAP's first attacks outside of Nigeria's Borno State.
- 19 December - the Nigerian airforce carried out a series of airstrikes on ISWAP positions in the northern part of Borno state, killing 77 ISWAP militants. On the same day, ISWAP operatives attacked the village of Kilangal, killing 12 Christian civilians.
- 25 December - 22 ISWAP operatives and 6 Nigerian soldiers were killed after Nigerian forces launched a counterterrorism operation in the Lake Chad area.
- 26 December - ISWAP militants attacked a Nigerian military base in the village of Yuba Yadi, killing at least 10 Nigerian soldiers and injuring several others. Three Nigerian army vehicles were also destroyed in the attack.

=== 2022 ===
==== January ====
- 3 January - a Nigerian army post was attacked by ISWAP operatives in Gombi in Borno State. Two Nigerian soldiers were killed in the attack and the outpost was destroyed.
- 10 January - ISWAP militants attacked Tukur Buratai Institute for War and Peace, a military college in Borno State, killing two staff members and damaging the college.
- 18 January - IS's Amaq News Agency released a video showing the execution of at least 3 Nigerian soldiers and ISWAP operatives training in one of their bases, presumably in the Lake Chad area. The video also showed child soldiers training and attending an ISWAP school.
- 20 January - several ISWAP fighters and an ISWAP Emir named Malam Ari were killed in Nigerian airstrikes that targeted ISWAP hideouts in Borno State.
- 26 January - 7 Nigerian soldiers were killed in after ISWAP militants detonated an IED targeting an army foot patrol between Katafila and Mararia.
- 29 January - a Nigerian army camp was attacked by ISWAP fighters in Ajiri, northeaster Nigeria. One Nigerian soldier was killed in the attack.

==== February ====
- 2 February - ISWAP foiled a Nigerian army operation in Nagumi, in northeastern Nigeria, after they destroyed a Nigerian military convoy with an IED, killing a militia leader and 5 of his escorts.
- 11 February - a Nigerian army post in Kikino was attacked by ISWAP militants, killing 5 Nigerian soldiers.
- 22 February - Four officers of the Nigeria Security and Civil Defence Corps were killed after their vehicle hit a landmine allegedly planted by Boko Haram.

==== April ====
- 19 April
  - ISWAP claimed responsibility for a bombing that killed and injured at least 30 people.
  - Two ISWAP Khalids and four fighters were killed in an ambush by Boko Haram in Yale village.
- 20 April
  - Boko Haram fighters invaded an ISWAP settlement near Ngurosoye, resulting in the deaths of eighteen ISWAP fighters and six Boko Haram fighters.
  - 10 people were killed, and several others were injured from a Boko Haram attack in Yobe State.
- 21 April – Boko Haram fighters killed 10 people in a hotel in the town of Geidam. They also burned down the Government Science and Technical School and killed one person there in the same town.
- 24 April – ISWAP claimed to have killed five police officers in an attack on the Adavi police station. Kogi police authorities stated that three police were killed in the attack.

==== May ====
- 3 May – Seven people were killed in Kautukari village after it was attacked by rebels.

==== June ====
- 5 June – Owo church attack: At least 40 people were killed during an attack on a church in Owo which was blamed on ISWAP.
- 12 June – 47 Boko Haram fighters after an attack on their camp. Two members of the Civilian Joint Task Force were also killed.
- 15 June – 204 Boko Haram fighters and their family members surrendered to the Nigerian Army.

==== July ====
- 5 July – Kuje prison break: Over 800 inmates, including 64 Boko Haram members, escaped the Kuje Prison after it was attacked by terrorists.
- 11 July – An airstrike conducted by the Nigerian Air Force “neutralized” over 21 Boko Haram fighters and destroyed their hideout.
- 13 July – Six Boko Haram commanders surrendered to the Nigerian Army.
- 25 July – Thirteen scrap-metal collectors were killed, and three others were injured after a bomb dropped by Boko Haram in 2015 exploded.

==== August ====
- 3 August
  - Boko Haram commander Alhaji Modu, and 27 other fighters were killed by the Nigerian Army.
  - Three farmers were killed by Boko Haram in Gajeri village.

==== September ====
- 2 September – Four people were killed in a mosque in Borno, including the chief Imam, after it was attacked by Boko Haram.
- 15 September – Eight Boko Haram members, including a middle rank commander, were killed in a clash with ISWAP. Fighters from both groups were also left injured.
- 17 September – Two Boko Haram top commanders identified as Abou Hamza and Abou Ibrahim were executed by ISWAP.
- 21 September – Six Boko Haram members were killed in an ambush by the Nigerian Army.

==== October ====
- 7 October – ISWAP killed eight Boko Haram members in an ambush.
- 11 October – At least 19 ISWAP fighters were killed by the Nigerian Army in Borno State.
- 30 October – The Nigerian Army repelled an attack on the Wawa military base by ISWAP, killing eight insurgents.

==== November ====
- 20 November – 51 Boko Haram members, including two commanders, surrendered to the Nigerian army in northeast Nigeria.
- 22 November – Ngouboua attack: At least ten Chadian soldiers were killed near Ngouboua after they were attacked by Boko Haram fighters.

==== December ====
- 4 December – A clash between Boko Haram and ISWAP killed dozens of terrorists, including at least 23 ISWAP members.
- 6 December – 55 people, including 33 wives of ISWAP members, were killed in an attack by Boko Haram.
- 12 December – Four Boko Haram commanders, identified as Mala'ana, Abu Dauda, Modu Yalee, and Bin Diska, surrendered to the Nigerian Army in Borno State.
- 16 December – Six Boko Haram fighters were killed by Nigerian soldiers in Daula market.
- 24 December – Seventeen herders were killed in a pasture near Airamine village and all of their cattle were taken in a Boko Haram attack.

=== 2023 ===
==== January ====
- 7 January – 35 ISWAP fighters were killed in a battle with Boko Haram in the Lake Chad region.
- 28 January – 32 Boko Haram members, including a commander, were killed by Nigerian soldiers in Konduga.

==== February ====
- 25 February – Boko Haram launched two mortar bombs in Gwoza during presidential and National Assembly elections, injuring five voters.

==== March ====
- 2 March – Seven people from the Ngamma community were abducted by Boko Haram.
- 10 March – At least 25 fishermen were killed by Boko Haram in Borno State.
- 24 March – Twelve Boko Haram members were killed by the Nigerian Army while attempting to attack a military formation in Konduga.
- 28 March – Boko Haram's chief bombmaker Awana Gaidam was killed by his own IED.

==== April ====
- 1 April – Boko Haram killed a pastor and injured several others, including the pastor's wife, in Mathdaw village.
- 4 April – Eighteen Boko Haram fighters were killed by the Nigerian Army in the Sambisa Forest.
- 11 April – Eleven people were killed at Buni Gari during a Boko Haram attack.
- 29 April – Nineteen Boko Haram members were arrested and their hideout was destroyed in Kangori.

==== May ====
- 30 May – Boko Haram fighters killed eight people, including soldiers, in northern Cameroon.

==== June ====
- 13 June – At least seven farmers were beheaded by Boko Haram in Maiduguri.
- 20 June – Eight youths were killed by Boko Haram across Borno State.
- 21 June – Several Boko Haram members were killed in airstrikes conducted by the Nigerian Air Force.
- 22 June – Five insurgents were killed and ten were arrested by the Nigerian Army during an ambush.
- 27 June – Boko Haram members killed Abou Hassana, one of its leaders, and three other accomplices after he allegedly tried to form a faction.
- 30 June – Six people were killed and over 20 were injured in Damboa when Boko Haram launched a mortar into the town. The attack came after insurgents attacked a civilian during an unsuccessful attempt to raid the town.

==== July ====
- 5 July – Several Boko Haram fighters and members of their families were killed by ISWAP in Sambisa Forest.
- 9 July – A Boko Haram top commander and his lieutenant surrendered to the Nigerian Army.
- 25 July – 32 people were killed in suspected ISWAP attacks on two villages in Borno State.

==== August ====
- 10 August – Five people were killed and seven women were abducted when Boko Haram attacked a convoy of vehicles in Bama LGA.
- 12 August:
  - Boko Haram fighters attacked a military base in Wulari village, killing three soldiers.
  - Ten farmers were killed by Boko Haram fighters in Maiwa village.
- 17 August – An inter-ethnic clash between Boko Haram members in Borno State killed at least 82 terrorists.
- 21 August – 49 women were kidnapped by Boko Haram in Shuwaei Kawuei village.
- 24 August – At least 41 terrorists were killed in a clash between ISWAP and Boko Haram in the Lake Chad region.
- 25 August – The 49 women kidnapped earlier in the week were freed by Boko Haram after a state official paid a ransom.
- 30 August – Six Boko Haram members were killed and one was captured by the Nigerian Army.

==== September ====
- 7 September – Six Boko Haram members were killed by Nigerian soldiers in Sambisa Forest.
- 21 September – Ten farmers were killed and nine others were abducted by Boko Haram in Mafa LGA.
- 23 September – A soldier and three members of the CJTF were killed in a Boko Haram ambush.

==== October ====
- 23 October – Boko Haram fighters attacked a Customs office in Geidam, killing an operative.
- 25 October – Two Boko Haram fighters were killed by the Nigerian Army in Jororo village after harassing locals.
- 26 October – Four Boko Haram fighters were killed by the Nigerian Army in Babangida.
- 30 October – 2023 Yobe State attacks: Boko Haram militants invaded the village of Gurokayeya, killing seventeen people and injuring five.
- 31 October – 2023 Yobe State attacks: 20 people were killed and two were injured when their vehicle hit a landmine placed by Boko Haram.

==== November ====
- 3 November – The Nigerian Army foiled a terrorist attack in Kano State, arresting two Boko Haram fighters.
- 5 November:
  - A businessman was killed and four others were kidnapped near the town of Bama.
  - At least thirteen rice farmers were killed and several others were missing when they were attacked by Boko Haram members.
  - At least 22 people were killed and sixteen were injured in an attack by Boko Haram in Katsina State.
- 17 November – At least 60 people were killed in clashes when ISWAP ambushed a fleet of Boko Haram vessels in Lake Chad.
- 24 November – Nigerian airstrikes in Tagoshe killed Boko Haram kingpin Abu Asad and several other terrorists.
- 26 November – Dozens of IS-affiliated jihadists were killed when two of their trucks exploded after hitting a landmine in Masallaci village. Anti-jihadist fighters said that around 50 jihadists were killed.
- 27 November – Suspected Boko Haram militants beheaded 11 loggers in Damboa.

==== December ====
- 2 December – Nigeria's military announced that they killed 180 terrorists and arrested 204 in the past seven days.
- 3 December – While targeting terrorists, a Nigerian drone mistakenly bombed villagers in Tudun Biri who had gathered for a Maulud celebration. The bombing killed 85 civilians and injured 60.
- 6 December – Boko Haram kingpin Yellow Jambros and 17 other terrorists were killed in an airstrike conducted on their canoe as they tried to cross the River Jikudna.
- 8 December – Terrorists killed one person and injured several others in Gidan Shaho. The terrorists were deliberate in selecting houses to attack, and burned food silos in most of their targets.
- 9 December – A group of terrorists attacked Nasarawar Zurmi and killed two people. Four others were abducted, and valuable items were taken from the community.
- 10 December – A shooting at a nightclub in Anambra State killed at least seven people and injured several others. The gunmen arrived at the nightclub with intentions to kidnap the owner.
- 11 December – About 60 Boko Haram members attacked a community in Jere, killing a security agent and injuring another. The terrorists also looted three shops and deflated the tires of multiple vehicles.
- 16 December – Boko Haram gunmen killed a shopkeeper and burned down his shop in Gujba.
- 23 December – Nigerian soldiers killed 14 insurgents and rescued 13 kidnap victims during operations in the states of Niger and Kaduna.
- 25 December – Boko Haram terrorists killed two Christians, burned down houses, and looted shops in Kwapre village.
- 26 December – An officer of the Nigeria Security and Civil Defence Corps was killed by an IED in Jakana.

=== 2024 ===
==== January ====
- 1 January – Terrorists dressed as soldiers stormed the villages of Gatamarwa and Tsiha, fatally shooting 15 people and kidnapping another resident. The attackers also burned down houses after looting food from them.
- 2 January – Nigerian airstrikes in Kwatan Dilla, Abadam killed ISWAP leader Ba'a Shuwa and scores of his fighters.
- 5 January:
  - Fourteen people were killed during a Boko Haram rampage in Geidam, Yobe State. The attacks began when terrorists attacked a nightclub, killing seven people. The attackers then burned down a church, several houses and vehicles in the surrounding neighborhood, causing seven more casualties.
  - The Nigerian Air Force conducted an airstrike in Parisu which killed 12 terrorists.
- 8 January:
  - Six people were burnt alive and four others were injured during a Boko Haram attack in Gajiram.
  - Three people were killed and multiple others were injured when two vehicles carrying humanitarian supplies triggered a landmine on the Gamboru to Maiduguri highway. Three other explosives near the scene of the explosion were safely detonated by troops patrolling the highway.
- 9 January – Seven people were killed and two others were injured when a flatbed truck hit a landmine suspected to be planted by jihadists in Kunibaa.
- 15 January – Dozens of terrorists were killed during a clash between Boko Haram and ISWAP on the islands of Kandahar and Kaduna Ruwa.
- 17 January – Two CJTF members were killed and eight others were injured when an IED suspected to have been planted by Boko Haram exploded in Mafa.
- 19 January – Boko Haram ambushed Nigerian Army personnel in Marte, killing a lieutenant and two vigilante fighters.
- 20 January – Five people were killed and one girl was injured during Boko Haram raids into two villages in Far North Region, Cameroon.
- 23 January – Boko Haram jihadists clashed with Nigerien soldiers in Diffa Region, resulting in the death of ten soldiers and several dozen terrorists.
- 27 January – An IED explosion outside of Gubio, Borno State killed six people, including four children.
- 29 January:
  - Seven farmers were killed and seven others were injured in Gwoza when their vehicle drove over an IED planted by Boko Haram. Later, counter-insurgency expert Zagazola Makama reported that six of the injured also died, raising the death toll to 13.
  - Nigerian Director of Public Relations and Information and Air Vice Marshal Edward Gabkwet announced that the Nigerian Air Force killed over 30 Boko Haram members in airstrikes in Kaduna.

==== February ====
- 2 February – ISWAP gunmen opened fire on police officers at a police station in Gajiram, killing four.
- 4 February – Three people, including a police officer, were killed by Boko Haram at the election collation center in Kukareta during an election held by the Independent National Electoral Commission in Yobe State. Two patrol vehicles and the district head of Kukareta's palace were also burnt down.
- 16 February – Suspected Boko Haram gunmen killed a traveler and abducted a number of others along the Damaturu–Biu Highway.
- 18 February – Nigerian airstrikes in Marte killed three ISWAP commanders and 22 other militants.
- 22 February – Chadian soldiers clashed with Boko Haram members between Marte and Lokobadu area, resulting in the death of several militants.
- 24 February – Boko Haram militants destroyed two 330 kVA power transmission towers using IEDs in Damaturu. The towers provided electricity from Gombe to Yobe and Borno.
- 25 February – Nigerian soldiers of the MNJTF overpowered Boko Haram militants in Mobbar, forcing them to flee. Troops recovered two AK-47 rifles and several rounds of ammunition.
- 29 February – The Defense Headquarters in Abuja reported that Nigerian armed forces and its allies had killed at least 974 terrorists and freed 466 hostages in the month of February. They also reported that 1,157 terrorists from Boko Haram and Islamic State West Africa Province surrendered to armed forces, and large amounts of stolen crude oil and equipment had been recovered.

==== March ====
- 1 March:
  - Nigerian soldiers killed 3 terrorists who were a part of Boko Haram and the Islamic State West Africa Province and recovered several pieces of equipment, as well as one MRAP and one gun truck.
  - Dozens of people were reportedly kidnapped by Islamist militants in IDP camps near Ngala and other parts of northeast Nigeria. According to local reports, militants surrounded a large group of young girls and boys before taking them into the surrounding bushlands. They reportedly let some of the elderly captives go. Estimates of the number of people kidnapped range from 50 to 300.
- 5 March – Boko Haram insurgents raided the IDP camp of Gajibo in Dikwa, setting 30 houses on fire.
- 7 March – More than 100 children and a teacher were kidnapped at an elementary school in Kuguira, Kaduna State by unknown assailants on motorcycles. During the incident, a student was shot and hospitalized. The ages of the children abducted range from 8 to 15.
- 11 March:
  - Nigerian soldiers killed eight Boko Haram militants during an operation in Sambisa forest.
  - At least 35 Boko Haram militants were killed and 11 were abducted during clashes between them and ISWAP in the Lake Chad area and Borno State. Fighting continued until 13 March. Two fishermen were killed in the crossfire and two others were also abducted by ISWAP.
- 22 March – Nigerian troops killed five ISWAP militants and rescued 78 people in northeast Nigeria.
- 23 March – A military base in Gujba was attacked by Boko Haram militants, resulting in the death of one soldier.
- 26 March:
  - Seven Chadian soldiers were killed by an explosive device planted by Boko Haram near Lake Chad.
  - Two top commanders of a Boko Haram faction surrendered to the MNJTF.
- 27 March – Three jihadists and two bandits were killed during Nigerian Army operations in Borno and Katsina.
- 29 March – Boko Haram commander Mallam Yathabalwe surrendered to Nigerian soldiers.
- 30 March – Nigerian soldiers killed three Boko Haram militants and rescued nine captives in Churchur village.

==== April ====
- 5 April – Boko Haram ambushed Nigerian soldiers along the Buratai–Buni Gari road, killing an army lieutenant and injuring four soldiers.
- 18 April – A woman abducted in the 2014 Chibok kidnapping was rescued by Nigerian soldiers in northern Borno State.
- 24 April – Five Nigerien soldiers were wounded while guarding an agricultural site in Diffa after they were ambushed by Boko Haram militants.
- 25 April – Boko Haram militants attacked an army base in Allawa, Shiroro.
- 26 April — A heavy clash erupted between Boko Haram and ISWAP militants near several islands in Lake Chad, resulting in the death of 85 terrorists, with about 70 of them being Boko Haram militants.

==== May ====
- 5 May – Seven militants were killed and many weapons destroyed in an operation carried out by Nigerian Air Force.
- 13 May:
  - The MNJTF killed a Boko Haram militant during an ambush on Litri Island.
  - Boko Haram top commander Tahir Baga was killed by Nigerian soldiers during an operation in the Sambisa forest. Equipment seized during the operation included weapons, mobile phones, and Starlink Wi-Fi systems.
- 14 May – The Cameroon Armed Forces announced that it rescued 300 captives from Boko Haram in the past seven days.
- 18 May – 47 Boko Haram militants, including their families, surrendered to Nigerian authorities.
- 19 May – In an operation carried out by Nigerian Army in Sambisa Forest, 386 captives were rescued, some of whom have been captive for more than 10 years.
- 24–25 May – Boko Haram militants raided Kuchi village, Niger State, killing ten people and abducting 160 others.
- 28 May – A jihadist attack on Tunbun Rogo, Borno killed 31 fishermen and left 40 others missing.
- 29 May – Nigerian gunmen attacked a vehicle in Diffa, Niger, killing three Nigerien officials and a soldier, before returning to Nigeria.

==== June ====
- 29 June – 2024 Borno State bombings: In a series of suicide bombings by female suicide bombers have killed at least 32 and injured 48 civilians. The attackers have targeted a wedding, a funeral and a hospital in coordinated attacks in Gwoza, Borno state in northern Nigeria, as of now no terrorist organization has claimed responsibility for the bombings.

==== July ====
- 2 July – Around 70 jihadists were killed and around 5 camps destroyed in an operation by the MNJTF around the area near Lake Chad.
- 6 July – 11 ISWAP militants were killed and many weapons confiscated by Nigerian army in sambisa forest.

==== August ====
- 1 August – About 19 civilians were killed and dozens injured in a suicide attack by Boko Haram militants in Konduga Local Government Area of Borno state.

==== October ====
- 28 October - 40 Chadian soldiers are killed in an overnight attack by Boko Haram at a garrison near the Nigerian border.

==== November ====
- 9 or 10 November - 17 Chadian soldiers and 96 Boko Haram militants were killed in an attack by the latter on a military post in the Lake Chad region.
- 18 November - 5 Nigerian soldiers were killed by ISWAP militants in a raid on a Nigerian army base in Kareto village, borno state.
- 19 November - At least 50 Boko Haram militants killed after executing an ambush upon a Nigerian military convoy monitoring a power grid installations. Seven members of the military were reportedly missing as a result of this attack.

=== 2025 ===
==== January ====
- 14 January - At least 40 civilians were killed in an ISWAP attack in Dumba on the shores of Lake Chad. Farmers were rounded up and shot dead in executions.
- 17 January - Nine Nigerian soldiers were killed in clashes with Boko Haram jihadists near the town of Baga, Borno state.
- 26 January - Malam-Fatori Suicide Bombing: at least 27 Nigerian soldiers were killed after ISWAP suicide bomber detonated an explosive-loaded vehicle following a Nigerian army offensive on ISWAP-controlled territory between Borno and Yobe states.

==== February ====
- 15 February - American Republican Congressman, Scott Perry says that USAID has been allegedly funding Boko Haram, and other Terrorist Groups. However, no evidence was provided to support this allegation.
- 15 February – Militants of IS-WAP raided a Christian village and burned down houses in Borno State, Nigeria and attacked Diffa, Niger.
- 15 February – Execution of a Pro-Nigeria militia member in Maiduguri, Nigeria

==== March ====
- 11 March - 11 civilians were killed in a revenge attack by Lakurawa jihadists on Birnin Dede and six villages near the border with Niger, northern Nigeria.
- 25 March - 20 Cameroonian soldiers were killed in an attack on the Nigerian border town of Wulgo by Boko Haram militants.

==== April ====
- 14 April - 52 civilians were killed in inter-communal violence in the villages of Zike and Kimakpa, in the Bassa area of Nigeria.
- April 30 - 15 Nigerian civilians were killed after ISWAP militants stormed Kwaple village, near the town of Chibok.

==== May ====
- May 4 - 11 Nigerian soldiers were killed after ISWAP raided a military base in the town of Buni Gari, Yobe state.
- May 14 - 4 Nigerian soldiers were killed in an ISWAP raid on a Nigerian military base in northeastern Nigeria.
- May 24 - at least 29 people were killed after a group of armed 'bandits' attacked two villages in Northeastern Nigeria.
- May 30 - The Nigerian Army launched an assault on terrorist positions, suspected to be Boko Haram terrorists, in Bita, Borno State and claimed to have killed 60 terrorists. An IED also went off a local bus stop in Mairari village, Borno State, killing nine passengers.

==== June ====
- June 2 - At least 20 civilians were killed in a Nigerian airstrike in Zamfara state, northwestern Nigeria.
- June 5 - Nigerian troops repel major ISWAP attack on Malam Fatori IDP camp, neutralized 12 ISWAP insurgents in Borno
- June 11 - Local authorities reported that at least 20 civilians were killed in armed attacks in the Mangu local government area, north-central Nigeria over the past week.
- June 14 - At least 45 people were killed in a raid by armed gunmen in raid on Yelewata town, Benue state.
- June 26 - At least 20 Nigerian soldiers were killed in an armed raid by bandits on a base outside the town of Bangi in Mariga district, central Nigeria.

==== July ====
- July 4 - 11 people were killed in an ISWAP attack in the town of Malam Fatori on the border with Niger and another 17 killed in a separate Lakurawa jihadist attack in Kwallajiya village, Sokoto state, Nigeria.

==== August ====
- 19 August - at least 50 civilians were killed in an attack by gunmen on a mosque in Unguwan Mantau village , in Malumfashi district in northwestern Nigeria.

==== September ====
- 5 September - At least 63 people were killed in a jihadist attack on the town of Darul Jamal, which hosts a Nigerian military base on the Nigeria-Cameroon border.

=== 2026 ===
==== January ====
- 4 January - Eight Nigerian soldiers were killed by an ISWAP IED detonation targeting their vehicle near Damasak, Borno State. On the same day, 30 people were killed after armed men attacked the village of Kasuwan-Daji, Niger state.

==== February ====
- 3 February - Kwara massacre: At least 162 people were killed after suspected armed jihadists attacked villages of Woro and Nuku in the Kwara state, western Nigeria. Another 13 people were also killed in a separate attack in the village of Doma in the northwestern state of Katsina.

==== March ====
- 30-31 March - 27 civilians had their throats slit by ISWAP miliants in a mass execution in a forest outside the town of Mafa, northeastern Nigeria. The before, 11 people were killed in a separate ISWAP raid on Kautikeri village outside the town of Chibok.

==== April ====
- 7 April - At least 50 people were killed in a jihadist raid on the village of Erena in the Shiroro, Niger state.
- 11 April - 21 civilians were killed after armed bandits attacked a village in northern Nigeria’s Zamfara state.
- 12 April - Jilli massacre: At least 100 civilians were killed after a Nigerian Air Force fighter jet hit a market in a village in Yobe state. The jet was pursuing jihadist fighters in the area.

==== May ====
- 21 May - Boko Haram fighters killed 33 fisherman and loggers in an attack on Malam Maja village in nearby Dikwa district.

==== June ====
- 13 June - Gunmen killed at least 17 farmers in an attack on Goron Namaye village in Maradun district of Zamfara state.
