= July 2014 Maiduguri bombing =

Terrorist incident in Nigeria

On 1 July 2014, a van containing charcoal and an improvised explosive device exploded in Maiduguri, Borno State, northeastern Nigeria. It was detonated at about 8 am on a roundabout near a crowded market, killing at least 56 people and destroying several cars.

Security forces believe the perpetrators to be Boko Haram, a jihadist group whose insurgency began in 2009. Boko Haram have attacked Maiduguri more often than any other settlement. These attacks include those in July 2009, December 2010, May 2011, November 2011, January 2012, December 2012, January 2014, November 2014, January 2015, March 2015, September 2015, March 2016, October 2016, March 2017 and February 2021.
