= Konduga mosque shooting =

2013 mass shooting in Nigeria

During the morning of 11 August 2013, a mass shooting occurred at a mosque in Konduga, Borno State, northeastern Nigeria. The massacre, in which 44 people were killed and another 22 injured, is believed to have been carried out by jihadist group Boko Haram.

Boko Haram's activities in Konduga include massacres in January and February 2014, battles in 2014 and 2015, as well as suicide bombings in 2018 and 2019.
