= Kawuri massacre =

Terrorist incident in Nigeria

Coordinates: 11.5667°N 13.5333°E

Kawuri (Nigeria)

The Kawuri massacre happened on 26 January 2014 in Kawuri, a village in Konduga Local Government Area, 37 km (23 mi) southeast of Maiduguri in Borno State, northeastern Nigeria. About 50 insurgents attacked civilians with bombs and guns. They burned down houses and kidnapped women. The final death toll was put at 85.

The attackers are believed to be from jihadist group Boko Haram. Their activities in Konduga include a mass shooting in 2013, a massacre in February 2014, battles in 2014 and 2015, as well as suicide bombings in 2018 and 2019.
