= Battle of Konduga =

Battle of Konduga may refer to:

- Battle of Konduga (2014)
- Battle of Konduga (2015)
