= Chakawa and Kawuri attacks =

2014 terrorist attacks in Nigeria

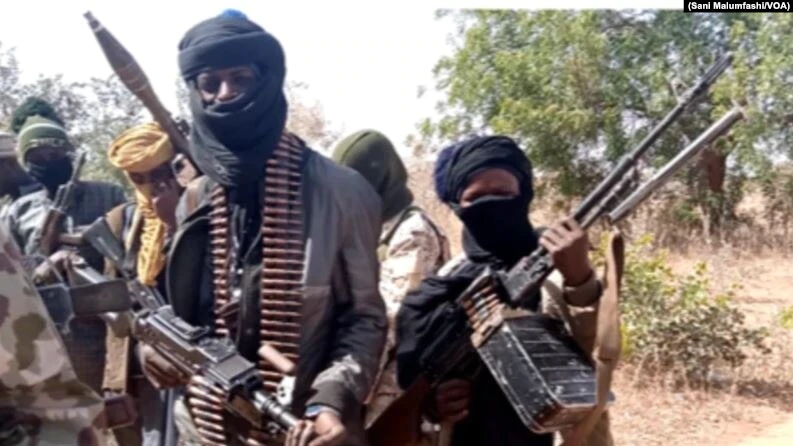
Nigerian bandits inside their camp

The Chakawa and Kawuri were a set of terrorist massacres that occurred in January 2014 at Kawuri, Borno state and in Chakawa village, Madagali Local Government Area, Adamawa State respectively (on 2 separate occasions in the latter location). All of the attacks have been blamed on Boko Haram.

On 31 January, a pastor and 10 members of his congregation were killed in Chakawa.

== 26 January ==
The night of 26 January saw a pair of simultaneous attacks at Kawuri, Borno state and a Catholic church in Chakawa village, Madagali Local Government Area, Adamawa State respectively.

In Kawuri, a village in Konduga Local Government, Borno State (located some 37 kilometers southeast of Maiduguri), some 85 people were slain overnight. The attacks have been blamed on Boko Haram.

In Chakawa (also known as Waga Chakawa) the throats of several church worshippers were slit, while others were shot. An estimated 31 people were killed, but this was revised to the figure of 41.

The final death toll has been put at least 138 people.
