= Battle of Damaturu (2013) =

- Part of Boko Haram insurgency
Date	October 24-25, 2013
Location	Damaturu, Yobe State, Nigeria
Result	Nigerian victory

Belligerents
Nigeria	Boko Haram

Casualties and losses
27-37 killed 20+ injured	35 killed 25 captured

Between October 24 and 25, 2013, Boko Haram militants attacked the city of Damaturu, the capital of Yobe State, Nigeria, but were repelled by Nigerian forces.

== Background ==
Boko Haram emerged in 2009 as a jihadist social and political movement in a failed rebellion in northeast Nigeria. Throughout the following years, Abubakar Shekau unified militant Islamist groups in the region and continued to foment the rebellion against the Nigerian government, conducting terrorist attacks and bombings in cities and communities across the region. The group had previously attempted to seize other towns in Yobe State like Gashua in April, and had previously attacked Damaturu in 2011 but were repelled by Nigerian forces.

== Battle ==
At the end of the day on October 24, Boko Haram militants launched a coordinated attack on police stations in Damaturu, staging the attacks on foot and in vehicles. Four police stations were set on fire; the police command post, the criminal investigation department, the mobile police headquarters and the C Division police station, all located on the outskirts of the city. Clashes between Nigerian forces and the militants lasted until late into the night.

According to a Nigerian police sergeant, 35 attackers were killed and 25 were captured, while 10 Nigerian police officers were killed and 17 soldiers were killed. An official at Damaturu hospital claimed to have counted 35 corpses in military uniforms. This toll rose to 37 by October 26. However, whether these were actually soldiers is unknown due to Boko Haram's usage of wearing Nigerian uniforms as disguise. 20 wounded Nigerian soldiers were admitted to a hospital in Jos.

On November 4, Abubakar Shekau claimed responsibility for the attack.
