= June 2025 Maiduguri suicide bombing =

On 20 June 2025, a suspected female suicide bomber detonated an improvised explosive device at a crowded food joint in Konduga, near Maiduguri in Nigeria's Borno State. The blast killed between 12 and 24 people and injured dozens more, according to police and local sources. No group claimed responsibility for the attack.

== Attack ==
On the night of 20 June 2025, a female suicide bomber detonated an improvised explosive device (IED) at a crowded fish market in Konduga Local Government Area of Borno State, northeastern Nigeria. The attacker, who was reportedly disguised as a customer, infiltrated the market during peak hours and detonated the device around 10 p.m., killing at least 12 people on the spot and injuring dozens more. According to eyewitnesses, the force of the explosion was so severe that only the bomber's head was recovered from the scene.

Conflicting casualty figures were reported in the aftermath. While police confirmed at least 12 fatalities, other sources suggested that as many as 24 people were killed in the explosion, with more than 30 injured. The injured victims were transported to nearby medical facilities for emergency treatment.

Security personnel, including Nigerian Army troops, police, members of the Civilian Joint Task Force (CJTF), and local hunters, responded swiftly to the scene. The area was immediately cordoned off to prevent additional attacks. Authorities have not formally attributed the attack to any group, but the region has historically been affected by the Boko Haram insurgency and its splinter factions.
