= 2019 Konduga bombings =

Terrorist incident in Nigeria

- Part of the Boko Haram insurgency
- Location: Konduga, Borno, Nigeria
- Date: 16 June 2019
- Target: Football fans
- Attack type: Suicide bombings
- Weapon: Suicide vest
- Deaths: 30 (+3 attackers)
- Injuries: 40+

On the evening of 16 June 2019, three suicide bombers detonated their explosives in Konduga village in Borno State, Nigeria, killing 30 people and wounding over 40. The first bomber targeted football fans who were watching a game on television in the hall. He was blocked from entering the hall by the owner. A heated argument ensued, during which the bomber detonated his explosives. This attack was the most deadly suicide bombing in 2019 in Nigeria. Soon after, the other two - both of whom were female - blew themselves up nearby.

Konduga had suffered previous attacks, including massacres in January 2014 and in February 2014, a triple suicide bombing in February 2018 and a suicide bombing at a mosque in July 2018.

On 27 July 2019, a group returning from a funeral in Nganzai, Borno State, were the victims of a mass shooting. At least 65 people were killed. There was no claim of responsibility, but Islamist group Boko Haram often carries out massacres, most often in Borno.

== Responsibility ==
There was no claim of responsibility, though the Konduga attack bore the hallmarks of Boko Haram. One of the group's bases is in nearby Maiduguri. BH regards football as un-Islamic and a corrupting Western influence.
