= March 2016 Maiduguri bombings =

Terrorist attack at a mosque in Maiduguri, Nigeria

2016 Maiduguri suicide bombings
- Part of the Boko Haram insurgency
- Aftermath of the suicide bombing at Molai-Umarari mosque
- Location: Umamari, Nigeria
- Date: 16 March 2016
- Attack type: Suicide bombing
- Deaths: 22
- Injuries: At least 18

On 16 March 2016, two female suicide bombers, thought to be members of Boko Haram, killed 22 people worshiping at the Molai-Umarari mosque on the outskirts of Maiduguri, Nigeria. The first bomb detonated at around 5am as worshipers were beginning their early morning prayers.

One of the women disguised herself as a man to allow her to access areas of the mosque usually inaccessible to women. She positioned herself in the front row of the mosque, then detonated her explosives as people stood up for prayers.

After the first bomb was detonated inside the building, the second was detonated 50 metres (160 ft) away, killing people fleeing the building, and those who rushed to help.

The attacks came soon after the Nigerian president, Muhammadu Buhari, claimed that Boko Haram were "technically defeated". In the aftermath, to defend these claims, military officials downplayed the severity of the incident as a 'common' event, experienced by 'countries around the world'.

== Significance of location ==
Maiduguri is the birthplace of the armed wing of Boko Haram. The mosque was located in Umamari, a village 4 miles (6.4 km) from the city, which has been turned into the command center for the Nigerian military's defense against the group. An almost identical attack was made to the mosque five months ago, with only the head imam surviving. The mosque had only re-opened three days prior to the latest event.

== See also ==
- Timeline of Boko Haram insurgency
