= December 2011 Nigeria clashes =

Conflict between the Nigerian Army and the jihadist group Boko Haram

Coordinates: 11.7444°N 11.9611°E

December 2011 Northern Nigeria clashes
Date	22–23 December 2011
Location	Maiduguri and Damaturu, Nigeria
Result	Nigerian victory

Belligerents
Nigeria	(Islamic State) Boko Haram

Casualties and losses
At least 7 killed	At least 50 killed

The December 2011 Nigeria clashes happened in several towns in northern Nigeria in late December 2011, within the context of the Boko Haram insurgency.

A major confrontation between suspected Boko Haram members and security forces broke out in the city of Damaturu on 22 December 2011 and continued into the next day. Army sources confirmed they had killed at least 50 militants during the two-day battle, over-running an insurgent base and munitions depot. At least 7 soldiers were killed during the clashes, including four that were shot to death in a drive-by attack late on 23 December. Another shootout took place in the remote town of Maiduguri, where at least 11 people were confirmed dead by the local morgue. Residents reported both towns virtually deserted the day after the attacks, which come less than 2 months after a similar deadly assault.

== See also ==
- December 2011 Nigeria bombings
