= 2021 Maiduguri rocket attacks =

Terrorist attack by Boko Haram

- Part of the Boko Haram insurgency
- Location of Borno State
- Location: Maiduguri, Borno State, Nigeria
- Date: 23 February 2021
- Weapon: Rocket-propelled grenades
- Deaths: 10
- Injuries: 8+
- Perpetrator: Boko Haram

During the early evening of 23 February 2021, Boko Haram militants fired a series of rocket-propelled grenades in Maiduguri, Borno State, Nigeria. The attacks killed at least 10 people; many others were injured.

== The terrorist attack ==
The terrorists started from Boboshe, a well-known Boko Haram base, and crossed the defensive barrier around Maiduguri. They then started shooting in the north-eastern Nigerian city. One of the rockets hit a playground. The shots were heard as people ran for safety. The initial, seemingly aimless shooting was followed by an attack on the University of Maiduguri, where the terrorists' gunfire had already been targeted.

During the incident, several high-profile structures in the city were damaged, including a mosque as well as Maiduguri International airport.

The airport attack in particular gathered concern, given that it could begin a new trend for Boko Haram to target commercial airplanes.

== Aftermath ==
In the aftermath of the rocket strikes, Nigerian president Muhammadu Buhari took a visit to the city, including the airport.

== See also ==
- List of terrorist incidents in 2021
- Timeline of the Boko Haram insurgency
