= 2018 Konduga bombings =

- Location: Konduga, Borno State, Nigeria
- Date: February 16, 2018; 8:30pm
- Attack type: Suicide bombing
- Deaths: 17-22
- Injuries: 22-20
- Assailants: Three suicide bombers (one female and two male)

On Friday 16 February 2018, a triple suicide bombing occurred in Konduga, Borno State, northeastern Nigeria. Two suicide bombers detonated their explosives at a busy fish market at about 8:30pm. Four minutes later, a third bomber exploded nearby.

The attacks killed between 17 and 22 people and injured between 22 and 70. One of the bombers was female, while the other two were male. Those injured in the attack were taken to a hospital in Maiduguri.

The incident was not reported until the next day. No-one claimed responsibility for the attack, but jihadists Boko Haram have carried out major attacks in Konduga before (including massacres in January and February 2014) and since (including a triple suicide bombing in June 2019).
