= Kuda funeral attack =

Mass shooting in Nigeria on 16 June 2016

- Location: Kuda, Nigeria
- Date: June 16, 2016
- Attack type: Mass shooting
- Deaths: at least 18
- Injuries: at least 10
- Perpetrator: Boko Haram

On 16 June 2016, Boko Haram carried out a mass shooting at a funeral in Kuda, Nigeria.

During the evening of 16 June 2016, a group of gunmen from jihadist group Boko Haram arrived in Kuda, a village near Madagali in the north of Adamawa State, northeastern Nigeria, on motorcycles. At the time, the funeral of a local leader was taking place. The militants opened fire on the mourners, killing at least 18 of them and injuring at least 10 others. The insurgents also looted food and burnt homes.

Boko Haram had previously attacked the village in February 2016.
