= 30 June and 1 July 2015 Borno massacres =

Terrorist incident in Nigeria

Coordinates: 12.9233°N 13.5606°E

July 2015 Kukawa massacre
- Part of the Boko Haram insurgency
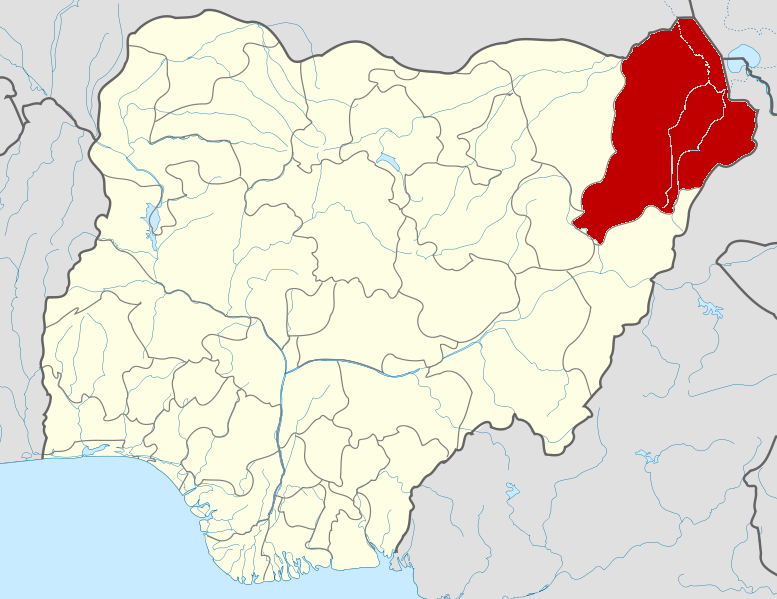
- Location of State of Borno in Nigeria
- Location: Kukawa, Borno, Nigeria villages near Monguno, Borno
- Date: 1 July 2015 (UTC+01:00)
- Attack type: Mass murder
- Weapon: Guns
- Deaths: 145
- Injuries: 17+
- Perpetrator: Boko Haram

On 1 July 2015, Boko Haram gunmen stormed the village of Kukawa, in Borno State and killed 97 people. According to an anonymous senior government official, the militants targeted mosques, which they believed taught a form of Islam that was too moderate. After killing dozens of people in the mosques, mainly men and boys, the gunmen then began to enter nearby houses and killed many of the inhabitants, including women and children. The following day, 2 July 2015, gunmen killed 48 more people in two villages near Monguno in the same state. At least 17 people were also injured in the attacks.
