= Ngouboua =

Ngouboua انغوبؤا
- Location in Chad
- Coordinates: 13°31′36″N 14°1′2″E
- Country: Chad
- Region: Lac

Ngouboua (Arabic: انغوبؤا) is a village in Chad. In February 2015, it was attacked by Boko Haram. In November 2022, many Chadian soldiers were killed by militants.

== 2022 attack ==
On 22 November 2022, at least 10 Chadian soldiers were killed in an attack reportedly carried out by jihadist group Boko Haram. The attack occurred near Ngouboua in the Lake Chad area.
