= 2010 Jos and Maiduguri attacks =

Terrorist incident in Nigeria

On 24 December 2010, jihadist group Boko Haram carried out attacks in Jos and Maiduguri in Nigeria, killing 38 people.

Four bombs exploded in Jos, Plateau State, killing 32 people: two near a large market, one in a mainly Christian area and another near a road leading to the city's main mosque. Six people were killed in attacks on two churches in Maiduguri, Borno State.

Boko Haram claimed responsibility for all the attacks.
