= March 2017 Maiduguri bombings =

Suicide bombing in Nigeria

2017 Maiduguri attack
- Part of the Boko Haram insurgency
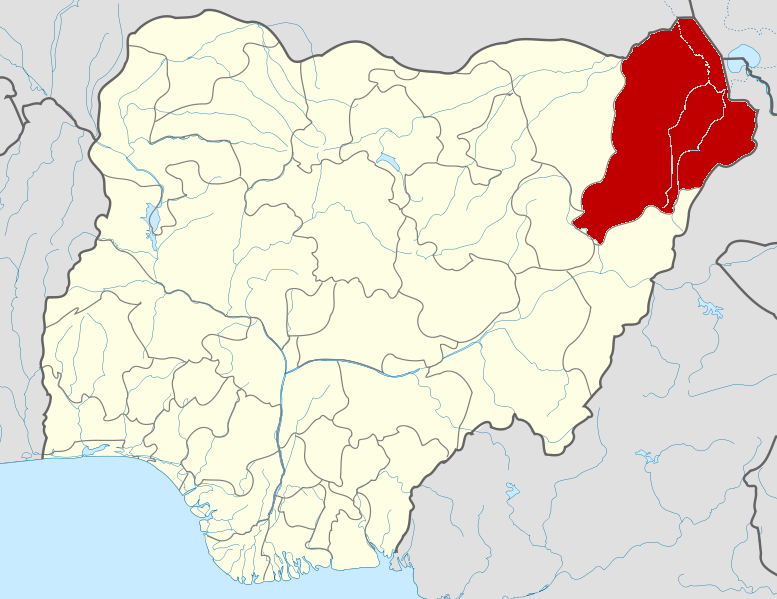
- Location of Borno State in Nigeria
- Location: Maiduguri, Borno State, Nigeria
- Date: March 22, 2017
- Attack type: Bombing
- Weapon: Improvised explosive devices
- Deaths: 8
- Injuries: 20

On 22 March 2017, at approximately 4:30 a.m, a series of bomb blasts occurred in three locations in the Muna Garage area of Maiduguri, Borno State, northeastern Nigeria. The blasts occurred at the Muna Garage internally displaced persons (IDPs) camp.

The attacks, which were unleashed by three to five bombers at different locations, resulted in the deaths of three to five civilian camp residents as well as themselves - and injured 20 people.

No terrorist group claimed responsibility for the explosions, but jihadist insurgent group Boko Haram - who attacked Maiduguri many times before - are believed to be responsible.
