= May 2011 Nigeria bombings =

Terrorist attacks allegedly carried out by jihadist group Boko Haram

2011 northern Nigeria bombings
- Location: Abuja, Bauchi, Zaria and Maiduguri, Nigeria
- Date: 29 May 2011
- Attack type: Bombings, terrorism
- Weapon: IEDs
- Deaths: 15
- Injuries: 55
- Perpetrator: Boko Haram

The May 2011 northern Nigeria bombings happened in several towns in northern Nigeria on 29 May 2011. The blasts happened just a few hours after Goodluck Jonathan was sworn in as Nigeria's president. Boko Haram was suspected in the attacks.

The first explosion struck the Zuba International Market in Abuja, killing two people (including a young girl) and injuring 11 others. Three blasts also struck the Mammy Market in Bauchi, near the headquarters of Nigeria's 33rd Artillery Brigade. Thirteen died and 40 were injured. No soldiers were injured. Two bombs also went off in Zaria, seriously injuring four.

Another explosion targeted a military vehicle in Maiduguri.
