= Konduga =

- Local Government Area and town
- Interactive map of Konduga
- Coordinates: 11°39′6″N 13°25′10″E
- Country: Nigeria
- State: Borno State
- Headquarters: Konduga

Population
  - Total: 13,400
- Time zone: UTC+1 (WAT)

Konduga is a community in Borno State, Nigeria and the center of a Local Government Area of the same name about 25 km to the southeast of Maiduguri, situated on the north bank of the Ngadda River. The population of the Konduga Local Government Area is about 13,400. It is one of the sixteen LGAs that constitute the Borno Emirate, a traditional state located in Borno State, Nigeria. The primary languages are Shuwa Arabic, Kanuri, Mafa and Wandala / Malgwa.

It is the birthplace of Senator Kaka Mallam Yale.

== History ==
By 6300 BP, pottery began to appear in Konduga. Occurring in the era of Mega Lake Chad, the pottery was decorated in the custom of Saharan ceramics.

As of 2006, most inhabitants were illiterate and engaged in subsistence farming, with earnings below US$20 per annum. Most people did not have access to potable water or electricity, and the roads are not passable in the rainy season. Maternal mortality is high. A 2003 study identified the main obstacles to accessing the hospital for emergency obstetric care as lack of money and transportation difficulties. Soil fertility in the area is declining.

== Boko Haram ==
On 5 January 2015, "Troops of the 7 Division of the Nigerian Army ... clashed with suspected members of the Boko Haram sect at Mainari village in Konduga Local Government of Borno State." The community has been the target of recruiting raids by Boko Haram. BH's activities in Konduga include a mass shooting in 2013, massacres in January and February 2014, battles in 2014 and 2015, as well as suicide bombings in 2018, 2019 and 2025.

== Climate ==
A mild season, lasting from July 20 to September 22, with an average daily high temperature below 33 °C (92 °F), follows Konduga's hottest month, April, which has an average high of 41 °C (105 °F) and low of 25 °C (77 °F).
