= November 2011 Nigeria attacks =

Terrorist attack allegedly carried out by jihadist group Boko Haram

- Part of the Boko Haram insurgency
- Location: Damaturu and Maiduguri, Nigeria
- Date: 4 November 2011; 17:30 (UTC+01:00)
- Target: Police stations, churches and banks
- Attack type: Car bombings, shootings, suicide bombings
- Deaths: 100–150(100 confirmed dead, possibly up to 150)
- Injuries: 100–500
- Perpetrator: Boko Haram

On 4 November 2011, a series of coordinated shootings and suicide bombings on northern Nigerian cities killed more than 100 people and injured hundreds more. A spokesperson for the Sunni Muslim terrorist group Boko Haram later claimed responsibility and promised "more attacks are on the way."

== Background ==
Boko Haram have become more proficient in carrying out attacks since a 2009 clash with security forces that led to the death of its leader Ustaz Mohammed Yusuf, Since then it has either claimed or been blamed for numerous attacks on Nigerian government and civilian targets. Most attacks have been the predominantly Muslim north of Nigeria, though the group's name has been called out in other bombings such as in the capital city of Abuja. The group itself has since factionalised with some allied to Al Qaeda in the Islamic Maghreb and some expecting terms of agreement similar to southern Nigeria's MEND insurgents.

== Attacks ==
Among the targets hit were the headquarters of the Yobe State police, several government buildings and two banks, as well as at least six churches. An unnamed local official told reporters that hundreds of wounded people are being treated in hospitals after the devastation in the city of fifty thousand. Gangs of masked men roamed the streets for at least 2 hours, setting buildings on fire and engaging in street battles with security forces. Government officials confirmed at least 53 people died in a double suicide car bombing at the anti-terrorist court building and numerous witness accounts spoke of a death toll significantly larger than the current one.

Hours before the Damaturi assault three suicide bombers attacked a military headquarters in Maiduguri and injured at least seven people. News reports suggest that the nearby city of Potiskum was also attacked, and on the next day Nigerian TV reported a firebomb attack in the city of Kaduna that left two people dead. At least three police stations and five churches were attacked.

Suleimon Lawal, the police commissioner of Damaturu, said that two suicide bombers drove a vehicle laden with explosives into the local anti-terrorist court killing 53 people.

== Perpetrator ==
As Boko Haram claimed responsibility for the attacks, its spokesman Abul-Qaqa said that "more attacks are on the way."

== Reactions ==
Domestic

A government spokesman said that president Goodluck Jonathan was "greatly disturbed" by the attack, and said his government was working hard to bring those "determined to derail peace and stability in the country to book." His spokesman Reuben Abati added that he does not consider the perpetrators to be "true Muslims," as the attack occurred during Eid. He further added that "every step will be taken [to arrest the perpetrators]. The security agencies will tell you that what happens on this scale is even a fraction of what could have happened considering the scope of the threat. The security agencies are busy at work trying to make sure the will of the majority of the Nigerian people is not subverted by a minority [group] with a suicidal streak." Jonathan also cancelled a trip to Bayelsa for his younger brother's wedding.

Ibrahim Bulama of the Nigerian Red Cross said the death toll could rise. He also said that there was a fear of another attack. The Nigerian Red Cross has also promised to fully investigate the actual casualty count and release it in the coming days. Lawal said that as police commissioner "my strategy is a security strategy [that] I cannot disclose on air. So as [Boko Haram's not] disclosing their security strategy, I don't think it is safe for me to tell the whole world what I am doing."

Nii Akuetteh, a former executive director of Africa Action, said that: "The government has been saying that it will deal with [Boko Haram] and that it will get a handle on the problem, but it's not been able to. Previously, the attempt made was to try and fight them militarily – to send the security forces after them – but that has created its own problem. I know for a fact that there're Nigerian groups in and outside the government, including the media, who are suggesting that the government should try to talk to Boko Haram. But my own impression is that they don't seem to be particularly ready or inclined to talk."

International

- United States – The embassy issued an emergency warning to its citizens that bomb attacks could be possible at several luxury hotels across Abuja. Nigerian National Security advisor General Owoeye Andrew Azazi dismissed the warning as simply creating panic.

Others

Isaac Olawale, of the Oxford University Centre for Research on Inequality, Human Security and Ethnicity said that: "The present attempt to deal with the problem using confrontational strategies will not work. There is poverty all over the country and an increased number of Nigerians are jumping into the warm embrace of ethnic, chauvinist and religious fundamentalism. Boko Haram expresses some of the social upheavals we are witnessing in Nigeria."

David Zounmenou, of the Institute for Security Studies, said that: "The difficulty is the amount of weapons unleashed into the desert by the downfall of Muammar Gaddafi and of his supporters. Those weapons are simply flooding into the region, falling into wrong hands. Some of them are certain going to find their way to Boko Haram, or the al-Qaeda in the Islamic Maghreb or other groups."

== See also ==
- Nigerian Sharia conflict
