= Battle of Konduga (2014) =

Battle in Borno State, Nigeria

- Part of the Boko Haram insurgency
| Date | 12 September 2014 |
| Location | Konduga, Borno State, Nigeria 11°39′06″N 13°25′10″E |
| Result | Nigerian victory |

Belligerents
| Nigeria | Boko Haram |

Strength
| 400 | 100-200 |

Casualties and losses
| Unknown killed 4 wounded (per Nigeria) | 100+ killed |
- Location within Nigeria

The Battle of Konduga was a military engagement between the Nigerian Armed Forces and Boko Haram insurgents in Konduga, Borno State, northeastern Nigeria, on 13 September 2014. Nigerian forces successfully defended the city, killing over 100 militants.

== Background ==
Boko Haram emerged in 2009 as a jihadist social and political movement in a failed rebellion in northeast Nigeria. Throughout the following years, Abubakar Shekau unified militant Islamist groups in the region and continued to foment the rebellion against the Nigerian government, conducting terrorist attacks and bombings in cities and communities across the region.

In August 2014, Boko Haram launched a campaign to capture several cities in Borno State, capturing Damboa in late July and Gwoza and other cities in August. In each city, the group carried out large-scale massacres against civilians and suspected pro-government people. The campaign continued in Gamboru Ngala, with Boko Haram capturing the city on 25 August and immediately launching attacks on the Cameroonian city of Fotokol. On 1 September, the group captured Bama.

Konduga has been attacked by Boko Haram several times since 2009. In August 2013, a mosque in Konduga was shot up by Boko Haram, killing 44 people. In February 2014, the group killed 62 and kidnapped 20 in an attack on the city.

== Battle ==
At about 4:30 am on 12 September, Boko Haram militants attacked the town of Konduga. According to the Nigerian Ministry of Defense, about 100 to 200 militants took part in the attack. The Nigerian Army had been informed of the attack ahead of time, and deployed 400 soldiers to guard the city and ambush the insurgents.

The clashes lasted about three hours. The Nigerian army claimed victory, saying that over 100 jihadists were killed. Nigerian officials also said that four vehicles equipped with anti-aircraft guns, two other military vehicles, and a cache of weaponry were seized. One soldier told Xinhua "Most of the soldiers killed were beyond recognition during the few hours of fury unleashed by our men." Nigerian forces only reported four wounded among their ranks.

== Aftermath ==
Some time after the battle, Boko Haram attacked a market in Ngom, killing at least 25 people. After the massacre, Nigerian soldiers pursued the perpetrators and killed about ten of them. In Bama, a city that the militants did capture, detained civilians were massacred by Boko Haram as retaliation for the group not being able to capture Konduga. Konduga was the first city in Nigeria to not have fallen to the Boko Haram offensive.

Konduga was attacked again in March 2015, which Nigerian forces again repelled. At least 70 militants were killed in the 2015 attack.
