= Battle of Konduga (2015) =

Battle in Nigeria against Boko Haram

- Part of Boko Haram insurgency
| Date | 2 March 2015 |
| Location | Konduga, Borno State, Nigeria |
| Result | Nigerian victory |

Belligerents
| Nigeria; Civilian Joint Task Force | Boko Haram |

Strength
| Unknown | 150 |

Casualties and losses
| 1 killed | 73 killed |

On 2 March 2015, Boko Haram militants attacked the town of Konduga, Borno State, Nigeria, leaving 73 militants dead.

== Background ==
Boko Haram emerged in 2009 as a jihadist social and political movement in a failed rebellion in northeast Nigeria. Throughout the following years, Abubakar Shekau unified militant Islamist groups in the region and continued to foment the rebellion against the Nigerian government, conducting terrorist attacks and bombings in cities and communities across the region.

Konduga had been attacked before, in September 2014 during a massive Boko Haram offensive, but the town remained under Nigerian control.

== Battle ==
Around 7am on 2 March, about 150 Boko Haram militants attacked the town of Konduga. The group infiltrated the town disguised as herders with a large herd of cattle, before opening fire on a checkpoint held by Nigerian soldiers and pro-government militiamen. Nigerian soldiers had told herdsmen prior to the attack not to approach government checkpoints, so the Boko Haram disguise was seen through easily. A suicide bomber attempted to drive his vehicle into the checkpoint, but was shot before detonating. The fighting lasted for six hours, until the early afternoon, but the militants were eventually repelled. The Nigerian Air Force intervened, bombing the militants that fled into the bush.

A Civilian Joint Task Force militiaman and a Nigerian Army spokesman both said that 73 militants were killed during the battle, and one Nigerian soldier was killed.
