= February 2014 Konduga massacre =

Massacre in Nigeria

Coordinates: 11°39′06″N 13°25′10″E

- Part of the Boko Haram insurgency
- Location: Konduga, Borno State, Nigeria
- Date: 11 February 2014
- Target: general village community
- Attack type: armed insurgent attack
- Weapons: small arms, explosives, arson
- Deaths: 62
- Victim: kidnapping of 20 girls
- Perpetrator: Boko Haram

The Konduga massacre took place in Konduga, Borno State, Nigeria on 11 February 2014. The massacre was conducted by Boko Haram jihadis against the inhabitants of this majority-muslim town. At least 62 people were killed and according to a teacher 20 girls were kidnapped

== Massacre ==
The massacre occurred on 11 February 2014 in Konduga, Borno State, northeastern Nigeria.

== Subsequent events ==
On 15 February 2014, Boko Haram launched a similar style attack in Izghe, Borno. Over 121 people were killed in the attack. Thousands of villagers fled the town for the border with Cameroon in order to escape the violence. Survivors reported gunmen indiscriminately shooting everyone in their path, burned down the churches, and looted all the food.

Boko Haram militants then proceeded to attack the Nigerian Army, killing 9 soldiers and subsequently forcing the army to retreat from the area. The army would then proceed to launch large scale air and land raids on Boko Haram, forcing the militants to hide out in the forested areas.

On 6 May 2014, around 200 people were killed when insurgents, dressed in military uniforms, attacked Gamboru, a town in the state of Borno at the Nigeria-Cameroon border. The attackers stormed into the town when some of the residents were fast asleep and set ablaze houses while shooting at residents who tried to escape from the fire.
