= Battle of Bosso (2016) =

- Part of Boko Haram insurgency
Date	June 3-5, 2016
Location	Bosso, Diffa Region, Niger
Result	ISWAP victory: Nearly all of the population of Bosso and surrounding areas displaced
Territorial changes	Bosso captured by ISWAP

Belligerents
Niger; Nigeria	ISWAP

Strength
Unknown	Several hundred

Casualties and losses
32-36 killed 112-115 injured	65 killed
- 50,000 civilians displaced

Between June 3 and 5, 2016, ISWAP attacked the town of Bosso, Niger, leaving dozens of Nigerien soldiers and ISWAP militants dead. ISWAP captured Bosso after two battles, a symbolic loss for the government.

== Background ==
Boko Haram emerged in 2009 as a jihadist social and political movement in a failed rebellion in northeast Nigeria. Throughout the following years, Abubakar Shekau unified militant Islamist groups in the region and continued to foment the rebellion against the Nigerian government, conducting terrorist attacks and bombings in cities and communities across the region. On March 7, 2015, the group publicly declared allegiance to the Islamic State and became known as the Islamic State – West Africa Province (ISWAP).

Bosso is a border town along the Komadougou Yobe river that separates Niger and Nigeria. There is a Bosso on both sides of the river, one in Niger and one in Nigeria. The Nigerien town was the first location that ISWAP (then Boko Haram) attacked in 2015, in a brutal massacre for the jihadists that left at least 400 fighters killed. Boko Haram attacked Bosso again a few weeks later, but with little success.

== Battle ==
Early on June 3, ISWAP launched a probing attack on Bosso, leaving ten ISWAP fighters killed and dozens injured, while the Nigerien government reported only three injuries among their ranks. The second attack that same day was much larger, involving several hundred ISWAP fighters. At about 6:30pm, the fighters attacked Bosso from the ISWAP-controlled towns of Malam Fatori and Damasak, overwhelming the Nigerien soldiers stationed in Bosso and forcing them to flee the town after a few hours of fighting. About thirty army vehicles were captured, and much of the town was looted or burned. The Nigerien government stated on the morning of June 4 that 32 soldiers were killed including two Nigerians, and 67 soldiers were wounded. ISWAP claimed responsibility for the attack and claimed 35 soldiers were killed.

The following morning, Nigerien and Nigerian forces reconvened and recaptured Bosso. The jihadists did not return until the night of June 5, with heavy fighting breaking out. The mayor of Bosso Elhadj Boko Mamadou said that the Nigerien forces were overwhelmed and fled to Diffa, a statement rejected by the Nigerien government who maintained they were still in control of the town. However, testimony from residents supported Mayor Mamadou's claims that ISWAP regained control. The Nigerien government began flying over Bosso with helicopters, preventing ISWAP from consolidating their position in the town.

== Impact ==
The Nigerien government revised its death toll for the battles on June 5, decreasing the reported number of slain soldiers from 32 to 26, including the two Nigerians. This new toll said 112 soldiers were injured and 55 ISWAP fighters were killed across the three days of fighting. The Small Arms Survey said that 32 Nigerien soldiers were killed and significant amounts of small arms were stolen. Nigerien forces were forced to destroy a Type 92A WZ551 vehicle to prevent it from falling to ISWAP. Residents of Diffa testified that funerals were held for between 30 and 36 slain soldiers on June 5. The battle was the highest death toll for the Nigerien army since the second battle of Karamga the previous April.

Prior to the battle, Bosso had a population of 6,000 and a refugee population of 20,000, excluding the population of surrounding villages. About 50,000 civilians fled Bosso and the surrounding area after the battles, according to UNHCR. The town of Bosso was left as a ghost town with the entire town fleeing, many of them to Toumour, some to Kabelawa, and some to Diffa.
