= Kelakam, Niger =

Kelakam Kélakam
- Location within Niger
- Coordinates: 13°33′22″N 11°44′27″E
- Country: Niger
- Region: Diffa
- Department: Maïné-Soroa

Kelakam is a town in the Diffa Region, Maine-Soroa Department of southeastern Niger.

== Location ==
It lies on the RN1 east–west highway of which runs between Diffa and Niamey, about halfway between the larger towns of Goudoumaria to the west and Maine-Soroa to the southeast. The town lies around 150 km west-northwest from the regional capital of Diffa.

== Agro-pastoral centre ==
Situated in the Sahel region, the area around Kelakam is used for stock raising (cattle, goats, camels) much of which involves seasonal transhumance, and intensive farming of cuvettes—rocky sinkholes which collect water in an otherwise dry land. Kelakam hosts a Saturday market.

Kelakam is one site of ethnic Fula pastoralist cooperatives formed as part of the UNDP "Nguigmi Peace Project". The project is designed to re-integrate former refugees and combatants from long simmering ethnic conflicts between Fula herders, and their Diffa Arab and Daza/Tubu neighbours over pasturage, water, and other land use. Fula pastoralists based around the town raise sheep and goats, and produce cheese and other agricultural products.
