= Battle of Gudumbali =

2018 battle in Nigeria

- Part of Boko Haram insurgency
Date	September 8-9, 2018
Location	Gudumbali, Guzamala LGA, Borno State, Nigeria
Result	ISWAP victory: ISWAP takes over town before retreating
Territorial changes	ISWAP captures Gudumbali briefly, Nigerian forces enter the next day but depart shortly afterward; Guzamala LGA becomes the first fully under ISWAP control

Belligerents
Nigeria; Civilian Joint Task Force	ISWAP

Commanders and leaders
Tukur Buratai	Unknown

Strength
Unknown	50-100

Casualties and losses
32 killed	Unknown
- 8 civilians killed Several thousand displaced

Between September 7 and 8, 2018, militants from ISWAP attacked Nigerian soldiers at Gudumbali, Borno State, Nigeria, killing 32 soldiers. The victory was ISWAP's first territorial gains since they lost all populated settlements in the battle of Malam Fatori in 2015.

== Background ==
Boko Haram emerged in 2009 as a jihadist social and political movement in a failed rebellion in northeast Nigeria. Throughout the following years, Abubakar Shekau unified militant Islamist groups in the region and continued to foment the rebellion against the Nigerian government, conducting terrorist attacks and bombings in cities and communities across the region. On 7 March 2015, the group publicly declared allegiance to the Islamic State and became known as the Islamic State – West Africa Province (ISWAP).

ISWAP by late 2016 was relegated to an insurgency, but in late 2017 starting with the Magumeri ambush began attacking Nigerian army bases in rural areas of Borno State. In June 2018, the group attacked Gajiram and killed 45 Nigerian soldiers and civilians. A few days later, they attacked Balagallaye, Garunda, Jilli, and Zari and killed over 100 more soldiers.

Gudumbali was the site of a 2015 battle where 144 soldiers were killed attempting to recapture the town. In June 2018, Nigerian soldiers recaptured it and held it for a few months. The soldiers, led by Chief of Army Staff Tukur Buratai, erected a cenotaph at the site where the 144 soldiers were killed three years prior.

== Battle ==
On September 7, ISWAP fighters attacked the Nigerian base at Gudumbali as well as the town itself. The soldiers at the base, part of the 82nd Division Task Force Brigade and the 158th Task Force Battalion, had recently gotten reinforcements. The clashes began at 7:50pm local time in the evening, and ended the following morning. The Nigerian soldiers retreated with civilians to Damasak and Gajiram. Some civilians who fled the attacks said that while ISWAP was not targeting them, stray bullets in the streets made escape from the town impossible until the early morning. While they were taking over the town, they shouted "Munkama garinsu gabadaya", Hausa for "We have taken over the town completely." Before retreating, the jihadists looted the military base and stores. The Nigerian military re-entered the town on September 9 without resistance. At the time of the battle, the Nigerian government was attempting to entice displaced residents of Guzamala LGA where Gudumbali is located to return to the town from Maiduguri.

ISWAP published a video on January 5, 2019 of the attacks on Gudumbali and Jilli. Between 50 and 100 fighters are shown in the video, armed with rifles.

On September 9, Nigerian army spokesman Texas Chukwu said that there were no casualties at Gudumbali. However, a local militiaman said eight civilians were killed during the fighting, and Reuters reported that 32 soldiers were killed. Almost all of the civilians in the town fled Gudumbali to government-controlled areas.

== Aftermath ==
In 2021, HumAngle Media reported that after the 2018 battle, no civil authority had returned to Guzamala LGA. Gudumbali and the other towns in the LGA were considered no-go zones for the Nigerian military, and it was the only LGA that Borno governor Babagana Zulum had not visited. Speaker of the Borno House Abdulkarim Lawan, who is from Gudumbali, said that after 2018 he has been unable to return to the town and that the Nigerian government has not made any effort to recapture it.

== See also ==
- Boko Haram insurgency
- Islamic State – West Africa Province
