= 2021 Diffa raid =

2021 battle between Niger and Boko Haram

- Part of Boko Haram insurgency
Date	May 29, 2021
Location	Between Diffa and Bagara, Niger
Result	Nigerien victory

Belligerents
Niger	Boko Haram

Strength
Unknown	15–20 vehicles

Casualties and losses
4 killed, 9 injured	6 killed
- 4 civilians killed, 5 injured

On May 29, 2021, jihadists from Boko Haram based along the Nigerien-Nigerian border launched a raid into the city of Diffa, but were repelled by Nigerien soldiers.

== Background ==
The city of Diffa, capital of Niger's Diffa Region and located along the Niger river that makes up the Niger-Nigerian border, has been attacked several times since the start of the Boko Haram insurgency in 2015. In May 2020, clashes broke out along the Doutchi Bridge in Doutchi, which links Niger to Nigeria. Diffa had a pre-war population of 200,000 people, but since the insurgency began 300,000 refugees have fled to the city.

On May 22, unknown bandits ambushed a Nigerien security post along the RN1 highway between Mainé-Soroa and Diffa, killing one policeman and kidnapping another.

== Raid ==
The attack began between 3pm and 4pm on May 29, with the Boko Haram fighters originating from the village of Bagara south of Diffa. The jihadists' invasion was halted by Nigerien FDS located between Bagara and Diffa, sparking battles. The Boko Haram fighters conducted the attack with fifteen to twenty vehicles. While the attack was repelled by the Nigerien forces, thousands of panicked civilians fled the area in anticipation of more attacks.

Nigerien forces later reported that four FDS soldiers were killed and nine were injured, and that four civilians were killed and five were injured. Nigerien forces reported that at least six militants were killed in the attack, and officials released a photoset of captured vehicles and weaponry.
