= Battle of Malam Fatori (2016) =

- Part of Boko Haram insurgency
Date	September 19-29, 2016
Location	Malam Fatori, Borno State, Nigeria
Result	Chadian-Nigerien victory
Territorial changes	Malam Fatori is liberated by Chad and Niger

Belligerents
Multinational Joint Task Force: Chad; Niger	ISWAP

Casualties and losses
40 killed (per ISWAP); ~9 killed, 20 injured (per Niger)	~50 killed (per Niger)

Between September 19 and 29, 2016, Chadian and Nigerien forces liberated Malam Fatori from ISWAP after the group controlled the town for over a year.

== Background ==
Boko Haram emerged in 2009 as a jihadist social and political movement in a failed rebellion in northeast Nigeria. Throughout the following years, Abubakar Shekau unified militant Islamist groups in the region and continued to foment the rebellion against the Nigerian government, conducting terrorist attacks and bombings in cities and communities across the region. On March 7, 2015, the group publicly declared allegiance to the Islamic State and became known as the Islamic State – West Africa Province (ISWAP).

Malam Fatori is located in northeast Nigeria, along the border with Niger and Lake Chad. Prior to the 2015 battle for the town where ISWAP recaptured it, Malam Fatori had 30,000 residents. After the battle though, almost all of the town's population fled elsewhere. The recapture by ISWAP was the third exchange of control for the town since it was first captured by Boko Haram in 2014, recaptured by Chad in March 2015, and recaptured again by ISWAP in July 2015. Throughout 2015 and 2016, Malam Fatori was used as a base for ISWAP to stage attacks on Niger and Nigeria, including deadly attacks at Bosso.

== Battle ==
In September 2016, allied troops in the Multinational Joint Task Force launched an offensive against ISWAP in northeastern Nigeria, particularly in Malam Fatori. This operation was codenamed Operation Gama Aiki. The offensive was conducted by the Chadian and Nigerien armies. After four days, Nigerian army spokesman Sani Usman announced that the MNJTF had recaptured Malam Fatori on September 20. Usman said that there was fierce fighting for the town, and that the militants had fled to the Niger-Nigeria border.

On September 21, the same day Usman announced the capture of Malam Fatori, the jihadists reorganized and counter-attacked. Fighting continued until September 29 according to Nigerien spokesman Moustapha Ledru, when Nigerien and Chadian troops were fully able to expel ISWAP from the town.

== Impact ==
On September 19, the Islamic State's Amaq News Agency claimed responsibility for the deaths of 40 enemy soldiers in an attack on a convoy near Malam Fatori. Ledru said on September 30 that 123 jihadists had been killed and two taken prisoner in all operations since the beginning of July in the Diffa and Malam Fatori sectors. Ledru also said that 14 Nigerien soldiers were killed and 29 were wounded. These losses also include those from the battle of Toumour between September 12 and 14, where five soldiers were killed and 68 jihadists were killed.
