= Battle of Malam Fatori (2015) =

- Part of Boko Haram insurgency
Date	March 31-April 1, 2015
Location	Malam Fatori, Borno State, Nigeria
Result	Chadian-Nigerien victory

Belligerents
Chad; Niger	Islamic State - West Africa Province

Commanders and leaders
Mohamed Toumba; Seyni Garba; Brahim Seid	Unknown

Casualties and losses
10 killed 15 injured	200+ killed 1 prisoner

Between March 31 and April 1, 2015, Chadian and Nigerien forces recaptured the town of Malam Fatori, Borno State, Nigeria, from the Islamic State – West Africa Province (ISWAP).

== Background ==
Boko Haram emerged in 2009 as a jihadist social and political movement in a failed rebellion in northeast Nigeria. Throughout the following years, Abubakar Shekau unified militant Islamist groups in the region and continued to foment the rebellion against the Nigerian government, conducting terrorist attacks and bombings in cities and communities across the region. On March 7, 2015, the group publicly declared allegiance to the Islamic State and became known as the Islamic State – West Africa Province (ISWAP).

During the 2015 West African offensive, Nigerian, Chadian, and Nigerien forces recaptured large swathes of Borno State that Boko Haram captured in late 2014. Malam Fatori had been captured by Boko Haram in November 2014. The offensive intensified in March, when Chadian and Nigerien forces captured Damasak, Chadian forces captured Dikwa, and Nigerian forces captured Bama and Gwoza. Chadian and Nigerien forces captured Talagam on the way to Malam Fatori. In response, ISWAP fighters launched a failed attack into Bosso, Niger, on March 30, attempting to slow the allied offensive.

== Battle ==
On March 31, Chadian and Nigerien soldiers divided into two columns to attack Malam Fatori. This offensive, which began at Damasak in mid-March and was led by Nigerien colonel Mohamed Toumba, Nigerien general Seyni Garba, and Chadian general Brahim Seid. Almost all of Malam Fatori's pre-war population of 30,000 fled when Boko Haram took over, and when the town was recaptured only a few elderly people remained. The Chadian government claimed to have recaptured Malam Fatori on the night of March 31 with brief ISWAP resistance, which the Nigerien government corroborated. The Nigerien government said ten jihadists were killed in the March 31 skirmish, although RFI said 40 were killed. Much of Malam Fatori was in ruins, as the ISWAP militants burned the town before they fled. The fighters also kidnapped some local women and stripped them completely naked to prevent them from escaping.

On April 1, ISWAP counter-attacked the Chadian and Nigerien forces in Malam Fatori. Ten Chadian soldiers were killed, and about fifteen were injured. However, Chadian and Nigerien troops maintained control of the city and arrests of ISWAP sympathizers began. Most of the fighters in Malam Fatori were young men, some as young as 15.

== Aftermath ==
Along with the Chadian casualties, the Chadian government said that around 150 ISWAP fighters were killed across the two days of fighting. The Nigerien government said that 289 ISWAP fighters were killed and 39 injured across all battles between March 26 and April 1. Col. Mohamed Toumba, the commander of the Nigerien forces, said that an initial toll of 100 fighters killed doubled to over 200 by April 2. Chadian general Brahim Seid said that only one prisoner had been taken.

After the battle, ISWAP held positions seven kilometers south of Malam Fatori. Mines were everywhere around the city and in the forests. Chad said that they were planning on transferring control of the town back to Nigeria.
