= Battle of Gueskerou (2017) =

- Part of Boko Haram insurgency
Date	April 9, 2017
Location	Gueskerou, Diffa Region, Niger
Result	Nigerien victory

Belligerents
Niger	ISWAP

Casualties and losses
15 injured	57 killed
- 2 civilians injured

On April 9, 2017, ISWAP militants attacked Gueskerou, Diffa Region, Niger, in an unsuccessful incursion.

== Background ==
Boko Haram emerged in 2009 as a jihadist social and political movement in a failed rebellion in northeast Nigeria. Throughout the following years, Abubakar Shekau unified militant Islamist groups in the region and continued to foment the rebellion against the Nigerian government, conducting terrorist attacks and bombings in cities and communities across the region. On March 7, 2015, the group publicly declared allegiance to the Islamic State and became known as the Islamic State – West Africa Province (ISWAP). The last major incursion by ISWAP into Niger was at Bosso in 2016.

== Battle ==
According to a witness, ISWAP militants arrived "in large numbers" on motorcycles and by car into Gueskerou on April 9. The militants appeared "well-trained and above all, well-informed" about the positions and movements of the Nigerien Army. According to the Nigerien Ministry of Defense, 57 jihadists were killed in the attack and only 15 soldiers and two civilians injured. One of the slain jihadists was a high-ranking emir according to AFP. The attack was ultimately repelled, with the remaining jihadist fleeing back to Nigeria.
