= Battle of Toumour (2016) =

- Part of Boko Haram insurgency
Date	September 12-14, 2016
Location	Toumour, Diffa Region, Niger
Result	Nigerien-Chadian victory

Belligerents
Niger; Chad	ISWAP

Casualties and losses
5 killed, 8 wounded None	38 killed 2 POWs

Between September 12 and 14, 2016, ISWAP militants attacked Toumour, Diffa Region, Niger.

== Background ==
Boko Haram emerged in 2009 as a jihadist social and political movement in a failed rebellion in northeast Nigeria. Throughout the following years, Abubakar Shekau unified militant Islamist groups in the region and continued to foment the rebellion against the Nigerian government, conducting terrorist attacks and bombings in cities and communities across the region. On March 7, 2015, the group publicly declared allegiance to the Islamic State and became known as the Islamic State – West Africa Province (ISWAP).

In June, ISWAP attacked Bosso, leaving dozens of Nigerien soldiers and ISWAP fighters killed in the seizure of the town. ISWAP was able to seize control of Bosso, its first territorial capture in Niger. Toumour suffered its first incursion on September 2, when ISWAP fighters murdered a Nigerian man before being intercepted by a local self-defense group. The jihadists fired upon the group, killing four, before fleeing into Nigeria.

== Battle ==
On September 12, villagers in Toumour gathered to celebrate Tabaski, but authorities were fearful of an attack. After being informed of a jihadist presence nearby, a Nigerien army patrol was dispatched and discovered the ISWAP fighters at a well eight kilometers north of Toumour. The Nigerien forces called on Chadian reinforcements to aid them in the battle against the jihadist group. Combing operations against ISWAP in and around Toumour ended on September 14.

Nigerien army spokesman Moustapha Ledrou said on September 13 that 30 ISWAP fighters were killed and two taken prisoner. Ledrou also said that five soldiers were killed and six were wounded. On September 16, he released another statement saying 38 jihadists were killed and two soldiers wounded during the combing operations between September 12 and 14.
