= Battle of Damasak =

- Part of Boko Haram insurgency
| Date | March 9–17, 2015 |
| Location | Damasak and surrounding areas, Borno State, Nigeria |
| Result | Chadian-Nigerien victory: Discovery of the Damasak massacre |
| Territorial changes | Boko Haram loses control of Damasak and surrounding areas |

Belligerents
| Niger; Chad | Boko Haram (Note: After March 8, the group was officially named the Islamic State - West Africa Province. However, the group was still called Boko Haram colloquially and by news media.) |

Commanders and leaders
| Toumba Mohamed; Ahmat Youssouf | Unknown |

Strength
| 1,000 soldiers 500 soldiers | Unknown |

Casualties and losses
| Total:' 11-15 killed, 33 injured 10 killed, 20 injured 1-5 killed, 8 injured | 228 killed |
- 50+ civilians killed 506 civilians kidnapped, unknown number of civilians displaced

Between March 9 and 17, 2015, Chadian and Nigerien soldiers recaptured the town of Damasak, located on the border between Nigeria and Niger, from Boko Haram. The bodies of over 400 civilians massacred by Boko Haram after the group's initial capture of the town in November 2014 were discovered when the Chadians and Nigeriens seized the town. Another 500 civilians were kidnapped by Boko Haram during the battle.

== Background ==
Boko Haram emerged in 2009 as a jihadist social and political movement in a failed rebellion in northeast Nigeria. Throughout the following years, Abubakar Shekau unified militant Islamist groups in the region and continued to foment the rebellion against the Nigerian government, conducting terrorist attacks and bombings in cities and communities across the region.

In the fall of 2014, Boko Haram seized many towns in Nigeria's Borno State, often massacreing hundreds of civilians like in Gamboru Ngala and Gwoza. Damasak, a Nigerian town separated from the Nigerien border by the Komadougou Yobe River, had been under Boko Haram control since November 24, 2014. On March 7, 2015, Boko Haram publicly declared allegiance to the Islamic State. (Note: Boko Haram had privately pledged bay'ah, or allegiance, to the Islamic State on February 9, but this was not publicly accepted by Islamic State caliph Abu Bakr al-Baghdadi until March 7. The official name of Boko Haram changed to the Islamic State - West Africa Province.) In response, Chadian and Nigerien forces stationed in Diffa crossed the Doutchi bridge near Diffa into Nigeria, launching an offensive against the militants with 200 vehicles. Other groups of soldiers crossed into Nigeria from Bosso and Diram.

== Battle ==
On March 9, Nigerien and Chadian soldiers began advancing on Damasak. However, the armies were facing stiff resistance in the form of guerrilla attacks and ambushes by Boko Haram in the forests. Progress was slow, and many areas were booby-trapped and mined by Boko Haram.

By March 11, the allied soldiers had reached Damasak, and fighting was ongoing for the city. Chadian colonel Ahmat Youssouf, the commander of the Chadian detachment, said that a first battle was fought in the villages surrounding Damasak before the soldiers reaching the city itself. During the fighting for the city, Boko Haram militants held captive 506 civilians that had remained in the city after its fall in November 2014. About 50 of these civilians were massacred by Boko Haram during the fighting, just before Boko Haram fled the town.

On the morning of March 17, 1,000 Chadian soldiers led by Youssouf and 500 Nigerien soldiers led by Colonel Toumba Mohamed attacked the town of Damasak, forcing Boko Haram to flee. The city was recaptured after seven hours of fighting. The hundreds of civilians held hostage by Boko Haram were brought along with the fleeing militants. Almost all of the town's 15,000 residents had fled during the November 2014 fall of the town and the March 2015 recapture, and RFI reported that only a few elderly people could be seen. About 50 people remained in Damasak after the battle.

== Aftermath ==
According to a Chadian security source on March 9, 200 Boko Haram fighters had been killed. In comparison, ten Chadian soldiers had been killed and around 20 injured. A hospital worker in Diffa said they had 33 injured soldiers, but no nationalities were specified. Reuters reported, citing a Nigerien military source, that five Nigerien soldiers had been killed.

On March 19, Nigerien Army spokesman Moustafa Ledru said that the offensive, labeled Operation Mai Dounama, left 228 Boko Haram militants killed alongside one Nigerien soldier killed and eight wounded. After the battle Chadian soldiers set up camps outside of the town and two Chadian helicopters arrived with supplies.

Massacres

On March 20, a day after entering Damasak, the Chadian and Nigerien soldiers discovered a mass grave north of Damasak containing around 100 bodies, including of women, children, and the elderly. More bodies were discovered in the following days, including in a dry riverbed and under a bridge. At least 400 bodies had been discovered, most of them slaughtered by Boko Haram in January, in and around Damasak after the battle. Many of the bodies had their throats slit and were mummified.

Of the 506 civilians kidnapped by Boko Haram during the battle, at least 300 remained hostage a year later. Some of the children had escaped, but those that did not were being taught in Boko Haram-led madrasas.
