= Second Battle of Karamga =

- Part of Islamist insurgency in Niger
Date	April 25, 2015
Location	Karamga, Lake Chad, Diffa Region, Niger
Result	ISWAP victory: Later forced to retreat

Belligerents
Niger	Islamic State - West Africa Province

Strength
120-150	500-2,000+

Casualties and losses
48-100+ killed 17-32 missing 9 injured	156 killed
- 28 civilians killed

On April 25, 2015, militants from the Islamic State – West Africa Province (ISWAP) attacked the Nigerien island of Karamga for the second time since the start of the year. Dozens of soldiers and civilians were killed in the battle.

== Background ==
Boko Haram emerged in 2009 as a jihadist social and political movement in a failed rebellion in northeast Nigeria. Throughout the following years, Abubakar Shekau unified militant Islamist groups in the region and continued to foment the rebellion against the Nigerian government, conducting terrorist attacks and bombings in cities and communities across the region. On March 7, 2015, the group publicly declared allegiance to the Islamic State and became known as the Islamic State – West Africa Province (ISWAP).

In the first battle of Karamga on February 19, which was the second major incursion by Boko Haram into Nigerien territory, seven Nigerien soldiers were killed and 15 militants were killed. Much of the island's population fled elsewhere after the first attack, but the Nigerien military maintained a base on the island.

== Battle ==
At dawn on April 25, ISWAP militants launched an attack on Karamga. Between several hundred to over 2,000 jihadists took part in the battle, a much larger number than the February incursion. The militants landed on the island on foot and on motorcycles. The Nigerien soldiers at the island, only about 120 to 150 of them, were taken by surprise and overwhelmed. Survivors of the attack said that the death toll was very heavy.

After the soldiers were neutralized, the jihadists began attacking the remaining civilians on the island. The militants burned houses and shot at fleeing civilians, even those who were swimming. The militants remained on the island until Chadian helicopters from Diffa began bombarding it. The heavy bombardment forced the jihadists to retreat, and Nigerien forces then recovered the island.

== Aftermath ==
No official figures were released initially, and French news agencies RFI and AFP said that the death toll was heavy. A Chadian source gave a death toll of 48 killed and 36 missing, while a southeastern Nigerien official gave a toll of 80 killed and 30 missing. Another source in the Nigerien army said 100 were killed and 17 were missing. The Nigerien government reported on April 28 that 46 soldiers were killed, nine were wounded, and 32 were missing. Another 28 civilians and 156 jihadists were killed.
