= Bosso Department =

Bosso
- Department
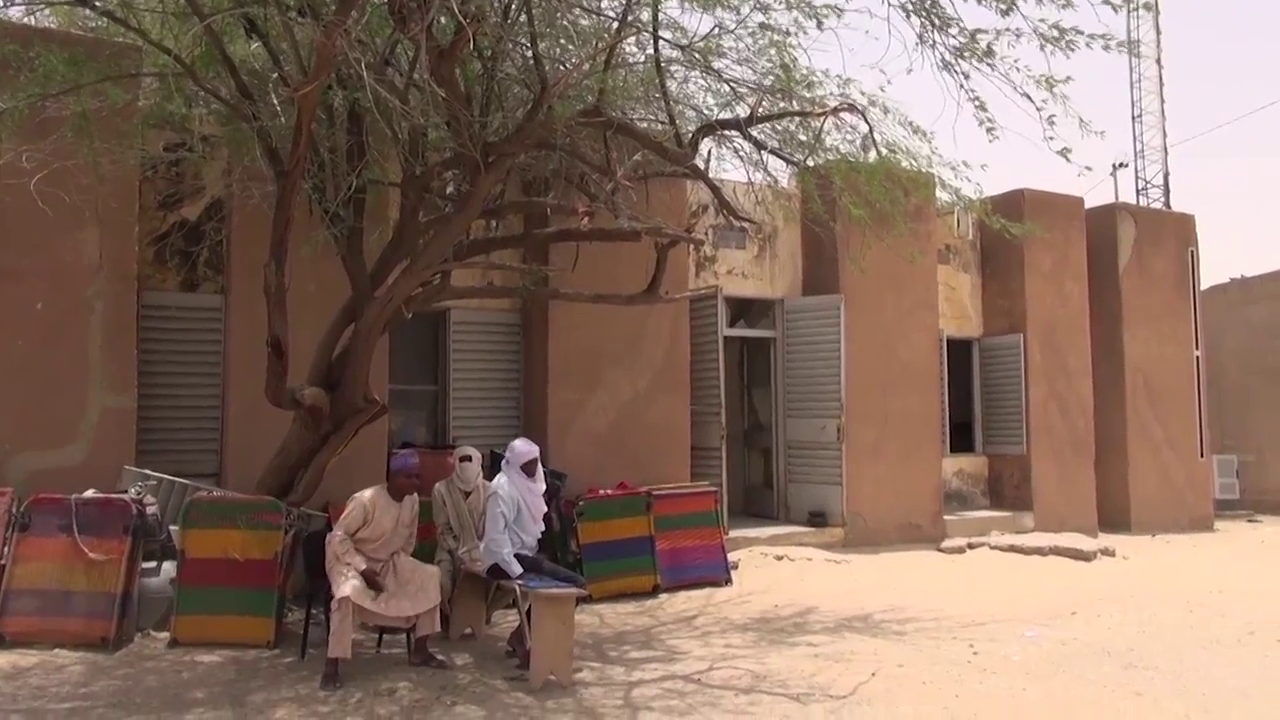
- Bosso
- Interactive map of Bosso
- Country: Niger
- Region: Diffa Region

Area
  - Total: 688 sq mi (1,782 km^{2})

Population (2012)
  - Total: 76,735
  - Density: 111.5/sq mi (43.06/km^{2})
- Time zone: UTC+1 (GMT 1)

Bosso is a department of the Diffa Region in Niger. The department is located in the south-east of the country and borders Nigeria and Chad. Its administrative seat is the city of Bosso. As of 2012, the department had a total population of 32,731 people.

== History ==
The department goes back to the administrative post (poste administratif) of Bosso, which was separated from the Diffa department in 2011 and elevated to the Bosso department.

== Municipalities ==
Bosso Department is divided into two municipalities, listed with population as of 2012 census:

- Bosso (65,022)
- Toumour (11,713)
