= Oumarou Tawaye =

Governor of Tahoua Region
- In office August 2, 2023 – May 27, 2025
- Preceded by: Issa Moussa
- Succeeded by: Souleymane Amadou Moussa

Personal details
- Party: CNSP (2023-present)

Military service
- Branch/service: Nigerien Armed Forces
- Years of service: 1991-present
- Rank: Colonel-Major
- Battles/wars: Tuareg rebellion (1990–1995); Islamist insurgency in Niger

Oumarou Tawaye is a Nigerien soldier and politician currently who served as Governor of Tahoua Region between August 2023 and May 2025.

== Biography ==
Tawaye may be from Badaguichiri, Tahoua Region, Niger. Tawaye commanded a 2,000-strong corps during the 1991 Tuareg rebellion. In 2013, he was the Chief of the National Guard in Niger, and a close confidant of Mahamadou Issoufou. As a soldier and officer, he was trained by the United States alongside Iro Oumarou and Mahamadou Ibrahim Bagadoma, who were also appointed governors of Nigerien regions after the 2023 coup. In 2017, Tawaye was promoted by Issoufou.

Tawaye was appointed Governor of Tahoua Region on August 2, 2023, after the 2023 Nigerien coup d'état. One of his first acts as governor was to meet with local leaders. In May 2024, Nigerien Minister of Water Resources Abdoulaye Maizama visited Tawaye in Tahoua region to inspect new ponds built in a national pond-building campaign. By that same time, Tawaye said that hydrocarbon fraud and security issues (from the Islamic State and JNIM) were major problems in Tahoua. He chaired a security meeting in October 2024 to address persistent insecurity.

On May 27, 2025, Tawaye was dismissed and Abdourahamane Tiani installed Souleymane Amadou Moussa as governor.
