= Battle of Kumche =

- Part of Boko Haram insurgency
Date	24 February 2016
Location	Kumche, Borno State, Nigeria
Result	Cameroonian-Nigerian victory

Belligerents
Multinational Joint Task Force: Cameroon; Nigeria	ISWAP

Strength
1,000	Unknown

Casualties and losses
2 killed Unknown	92 killed
- 850 civilian hostages rescued

On 24 February 2016, Cameroonian forces defeated ISWAP at Kumche, Borno State, Nigeria, killing 92 ISWAP fighters.

== Background ==
Boko Haram emerged in 2009 as a jihadist social and political movement in a failed rebellion in northeast Nigeria. Throughout the following years, Abubakar Shekau unified militant Islamist groups in the region and continued to foment the rebellion against the Nigerian government, conducting terrorist attacks and bombings in cities and communities across the region. On 7 March 2015, the group publicly declared allegiance to the Islamic State and became known as the Islamic State – West Africa Province (ISWAP).

During the 2015 West African offensive, Nigerian, Chadian, and Nigerien forces recaptured large swathes of Borno State that Boko Haram captured in late 2014. The offensive intensified in March, when Chadian and Nigerien forces captured Damasak, Chadian forces captured Dikwa, and Nigerian forces captured Bama and Gwoza. Malam Fatori fell to the allied forces on 1 April. Many jihadists fled into the forests of Borno State to recoup their losses. In response, ISWAP forces began attacking Chadian territory in late 2015. On 11 February 2016, Cameroonian troops entered Nigeria with approval from the Nigerian government to attack ISWAP camps in Ngoshe, taking the area four days later in Operation Arrow Five.

== Battle ==
The next objective for the Cameroonians after Ngoshe was the village of Kumche. Around 1,000 Cameroonian Rapid Intervention Brigade (BIR) soldiers and Nigerian forces assaulted Kumche on 24 February. Within a few hours, Kumche was captured by the allied forces. Three days later on 27 February, the Cameroonian government said that two soldiers were killed in a mine explosion, and 92 jihadists were killed. Another 850 hostages were freed in the liberation of Kumche.

== Aftermath ==
Cameroonian and Nigerian forces continued to clash with ISWAP at Kumche in the months after the battle.
