= Mariama Djibrine =

Nigerien human rights activist (born 1989)

- Born: 27 May 1989 (age 37); N'guigmi, Diffa Region, Niger
- Occupation: Human rights activist
- Organization: Alliance des Démocrates du Sahel
- Known for: Campaigning for democracy in the Sahel

Mariama Djibrine (born 27 May 1989), also known by the pseudonym Mayra, is a Nigerien human rights activist. She is known for her public campaigning for a return to democracy in her native Niger, as well as Mali and Burkina Faso, following military coups in 2023, 2021 and 2022, respectively.

== Biography ==
Djibrine was born on 27 May 1989 in N'guigmi, a city in the Diffa Region of southeastern Niger. As of 2026, she lives in exile outside of Niger, where she has been described a member of the unofficial Nigerien opposition against the military junta, led by Abdourahamane Tiani.

In May 2026, Djibrine founded the Alliance des Démocrates du Sahel (lit. 'Sahel Democrats' Alliance') in Brussels, Belgium. A coalition of Nigerien, Malian and Burkinabé anti-military opposition groups, its membership largely comprises activists living in exile in Europe. The ADS advocates for the return to constitutional rule and civilian government in Niger, Mali and Burkina Faso, bordering countries that are each led by military juntas following coup d'états during the early 2020s. Djibrine has characterised the ADI as standing in complete opposition to the Alliance of Sahel States, a confederation of the three states as an alternative to ECOWAS, including in the defence of civil liberties for people living in the countries. Djibrine serves as the president of the ADS, which she described as stemming from a wish to "not accept fate" and to "not let our countries collapse".

Djibrine is a supporter of Mohamed Bazoum, the former President of Niger who had been detained since the 2023 coup d'état. She publicly called for his release during the launch of the ADS. She is a frequent critic of the military government in Niger, accusing them of "instrumentalising" the justice system to "silence critics", including through the dissolution of the country's judicial union.

Following Djibrine's criticism of the Nigerien military and establishment of the ADI, she was named on the Nigerien government's terrorist database. Previous supports of Bazoum had been named on the database, including Hassoumi Massaoudou, and had subsequently had their Nigerien citizenship revoked.

On 11 June 2026, Tiani, in his role as de facto President of Niger, signed a parliamentary decree provisionally stripping Djibrine of her Nigerian citizenship. The General Secretariat of the Government, as well as military-linked media outlets, stated the decision was made after she had disseminated "information likely to disturb public order, inciting revolt, and colluding with a foreign power".

Djibrine subsequently released a statement on Facebook saying "you can take away nationality, but you can't take away conviction. Regimes come and go, convictions remain". The New York-based human rights organisation Human Rights Watch criticised the decision to strip Djibrine of her citizenship, stating that "nationality should not depend on political loyalty".
