= Goudoumaria =

Town in Niger

- Commune
- Location within Niger
- Coordinates: 13°42′40″N 11°11′25″E
- Country: Niger
- Region: Diffa
- Department: Maïné-Soroa

Area
  - Commune: 7,886 km^{2} (3,045 sq mi)
- Elevation: 351 m (1,152 ft)

Population (2012 census)
  - Commune: 100,559
  - Urban: 4,647
- Time zone: UTC+1 (UTC+1)
  - Summer (DST): UTC+1 (UTC+1)
- Area code: Miskindi

Goudoumaria, Niger (var. Goudomaria, Gudumaria) is a Commune and town in the southeast of the country, in Diffa Region, northwest of Diffa. Goudoumaria is an administrative post in the Maine-Soroa Department, and is approximately 50 km north of the Nigerian border and approximately 50 km east of the small city Soubdou.

As of 2012, the Commune had a population of 100,559.

== Climate ==
Goudoumaria, historically an area of pastoralism and marginal farming, is in the Sahel region, bordering the Sahara. Desertification has led to changes in farming trends and growth of Date palm farming in recent decades.
