= Damasak General Hospital =

Geography
- Location: Damasak, Borno State, Nigeria

Links
- Lists: Hospitals in Nigeria

The General Hospital Damasak is a government established hospital located in Damasak Local Government Area of Borno State, Nigeria. It provides medical and health care services to the community.
