= Kelakam =

Kelakam may refer to:

- Kelakam, India
- Kelakam, Niger
