= Battle of Talagam =

- Part of Boko Haram insurgency
Date	29 March 2015
Location	Talagam, Borno State, Nigeria
Result	Chadian-Nigerien victory
Territorial changes	Talagam captured by coalition forces

Belligerents
Chad; Niger	Islamic State - West Africa Province

Casualties and losses
2 killed 15 injured	54 killed

On 29 March 2015, Chadian and Nigerien forces captured the town of Talagam, Borno State, Nigeria from the Islamic State – West Africa Province, killing 54 militants.

== Background ==
Boko Haram emerged in 2009 as a jihadist social and political movement in a failed rebellion in northeast Nigeria. Throughout the following years, Abubakar Shekau unified militant Islamist groups in the region and continued to foment the rebellion against the Nigerian government, conducting terrorist attacks and bombings in cities and communities across the region. On 7 March 2015, the group publicly declared allegiance to the Islamic State and became known as the Islamic State – West Africa Province (ISWAP).

During the 2015 West African offensive, Nigerian, Chadian, and Nigerien forces recaptured large swathes of Borno State that Boko Haram captured in late 2014. The offensive intensified in March, when Chadian and Nigerien forces captured Damasak, Chadian forces captured Dikwa, and Nigerian forces captured Bama and Gwoza.

== Battle ==
After taking Damasak on 17 March, Nigerien and Chadian troops began advancing on the town of Talagam, on the road to Malam Fatori. Nigerien officials said that they had destroyed a ISWAP base during the battle for the town. Both the Nigerien and Chadian armies said that 54 militants were killed. The Chadian army said two coalition forces were killed and 15 were injured; the Nigerien government said three were injured.

The capture of Talagam was one of several of the Chadian-Nigerien campaign on the way to Malam Fatori, alongside Gachagar and Abadam.

== Aftermath ==
The following day, ISWAP attacked Bosso in Niger for the second time in 2015. The attack was provoked by the Chadian-Nigerien victory at Talagam.
