= Ayuba Stephen Wakawa =

Nigerian politician

Ayuba Stephen Wakawa is a Nigerian politician. He was the representative for the Hawul constituency in the Borno State House of Assembly.
