= Damasak kidnapping =

2015 Nigerian abduction

In March 2015, several children were kidnapped by Boko Haram, apparently during the months-long occupation of the town of Damasak by the group. (Note: This was related to the Damasak massacre.) The Jonathan government was accused of ignoring this incident.

Years later the victims were still unaccounted for.
