= Issoufou Labo =

Nigerien military officer and governor

Governor of Zinder Region
- In office August 1, 2023 – January 9, 2025
- Preceded by: Laouali Amadou Madougou
- Succeeded by: Maman Sani Massalatchi

Personal details
- Party: CNSP (2023-present)
- Occupation: Engineer

Military service
- Rank: Colonel

Issoufou Labo is a Nigerien officer who served as governor of Zinder Region between 2023 and 2025.

== Biography ==
Early renditions of Labo's name prior to being appointed governor in August 2023 show his name as Labo Issoufou. By August 2023, Labo was a colonel in the Nigerien Armed Forces, and had served in the army as a water and forestry engineer. He had participated in American training.

After the 2023 Nigerien coup d'état, Labo was appointed governor of Zinder Region on August 1. He was inaugurated as governor in Zinder on August 8, during a meeting with outgoing governor Laouali Amadou Madougou and other officials in Zinder region. One of the main issues Labo targeted as governor was drug-trafficking, of which Zinder is a common location for smuggling drugs in the Niger-Nigeria-Benin borderlands. Between late 2023 and early 2024, Labo reportedly preached heavily in favor of the CNSP in Zinder. In March 2024, Labo said "Zinder is one of the regions that is at peace, this is due to the CNSP." He organized a traditional Nigerien wrestling tournament in Zinder from March 7 to 9, 2024 for the arrival of junta leader Abdourahamane Tiani.

Labo was dismissed as governor on January 9, 2025, alongside Iro Oumarou of Dosso Region. His successor, Maman Sani Massalatchi, was inaugurated on January 23. While leaving, Labo said he still supported the policies of the CNSP.
