= Seyni =

Seyni is a name. Notable people with the name include:

== Given name ==
- Seyni Garba, Nigerien army general
- Seyni Kountché (1931–1987), Nigerien military officer and president
- Seyni N'Diaye (born 1973), Senegalese football player
- Seyni Oumarou (born 1951), Nigerien politician

== Surname ==
- Aminatou Seyni (born 1996), Nigerien sprinter
