= First Battle of Karamga =

- Part of Boko Haram insurgency
Date	February 19, 2015
Location	Karamga, Lake Chad, Niger
Result	Nigerien victory

Belligerents
Niger; Chad	Boko Haram

Casualties and losses
7 killed, 4 injured, 5 missing None	15 killed
- 1 civilian killed

On February 19, 2015, Boko Haram militants attacked the island of Karamga, in Nigerien territory of Lake Chad, sparking a battle with Nigerien soldiers. The battle was the second Boko Haram attack on Nigerien soil, and two months later Boko Haram attacked Karamga again.

== Background ==
Boko Haram emerged in 2009 as a jihadist social and political movement in a failed rebellion in northeast Nigeria. Throughout the following years, Abubakar Shekau unified militant Islamist groups in the region and continued to foment the rebellion against the Nigerian government, conducting terrorist attacks and bombings in cities and communities across the region.

In February 2015, fighting was ongoing south of Lake Chad between Chadian and Cameroonian troops in Fotokol and Boko Haram militants in Gamboru Ngala. Meanwhile, the Nigerian army was preparing a troop deployment to the Nigeria-Niger border west of Lake Chad. Boko Haram attacked Niger for the first time on February 6 at Bosso, being repulsed by Nigerien and Chadian troops. Around 400 Boko Haram fighters died in the battle.

The island of Karamga, at the time of the attack, was hosting 3,650 displaced people from Abadam, Damasak, Gamboru, and Bosso.

== Battle ==
Around 9pm on February 19, Boko Haram militants attacked Karamga Island in Lake Chad, on the border between Niger, Nigeria, and Chad. The attackers used canoes to land on an island next to Karamga, and infiltrated the village before attacking the Nigerien Army outpost in Karamga. The Nigerian newspaper The Guardian said that the jihadists had Toyota Hiluxes in the attack. The jihadists attempted to go through Karamga to reach Chad, but were intercepted by the Nigeriens. The Chadian Air Force began bombing the jihadists, destroying five canoes.

Seven Nigerien soldiers were killed in the attack, four were wounded, and five were missing. Around 15 militants were killed in the attack, according to the Nigerien Ministry of Defense. One civilian was killed.

== Aftermath ==
In April, Boko Haram attacked Karamga again, killing 28 civilians and dozens of Nigerien soldiers and Boko Haram fighters.
