= Ibra Boulama =

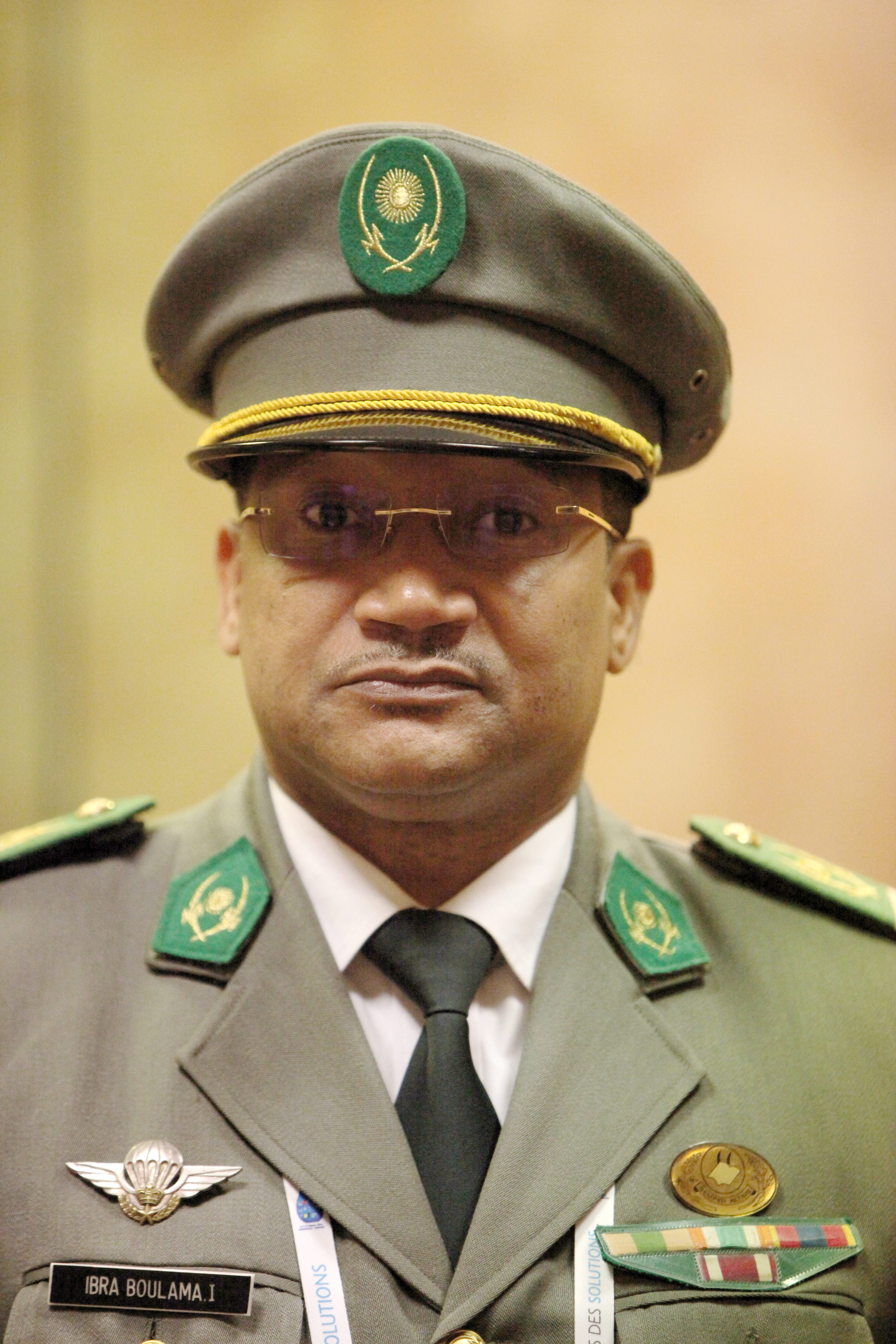
- Boulama in 2012

Governor of Agadez Region
- Incumbent
- Assumed office August 8, 2023
- Preceded by: Magagi Maman Dada

Chief of Staff to the President
- In office May 17, 2016 – January 13, 2018
- Succeeded by: Iro Oumarou

Personal details
- Born: Ibrahim Boulama Issa
- Party: CNSP (2023-present)

Military service
- Rank: Major General

Ibra Boulama Issa is a Nigerien politician and soldier who has served as the governor of Agadez Region since 2023.

== Biography ==
Little is known publicly about where or when Boulama was born.

In 2016, Boulama was promoted from colonel to a brigadier general. He was appointed Chief of Staff to the President on May 17, 2016. In 2016, he was appointed the director of the Nigerien think tank National Centre for Strategic and Security Studies (CNESS). On July 26, 2018, Seidou Magagi Mahamadou replaced Boulama as director of the CNESS. Boulama helped expand the CNESS' research with other international think tanks like the Institute for Security Studies (ISS) and the Konrad Adenauer Foundation. On January 13, 2018, he was demoted to Deputy Chief of Staff of the Army and succeeded by Iro Oumarou.

Following the 2023 Nigerien coup d'état that deposed Mohamed Bazoum, Boulama was appointed Governor of Agadez by the Nigerien junta on August 6. One of Boulama's first acts as governor in September 2023 was to hold a meeting with top political and military officials in Agadez region. In October, he toured mining sites in Arlit. By 2023, he was a brigadier general. He repealed Law 036-2015, which criminalized migrants going north from Agadez into Libya.

In a 2024 interview, Boulama claimed that the security situation in Agadez had improved since the coup in 2023, although most social services in the region were obsolete and unstaffed. In a 2025 interview on the two-year anniversary of the coup, he repeated similar claims about improved security in Agadez and said a large-scale irrigation project had commenced. In 2026, Boulama attempted to address failing water and electricity needs in Agadez region. By May 2026, he was a major general.
