= Abdulkarim Lawan =

Nigerian politician

Speaker of the Borno State House of Assembly
- Incumbent
- Assumed office 9 February 2012
- Preceded by: Goni Ali Modu
- Constituency: Guzamala

Personal details
- Party: All Progressives Congress
- Occupation: Politician

Abdulkarim Lawan is a Nigerian politician. He currently serves as the representative for Guzamala constituency in the Borno State House of Assembly and holds the position of Speaker. He is also the longest-serving speaker in Nigeria's history, having held the role since 2012.
