= Mahamadou Ibrahim Bagadoma =

Governor of Diffa Region
- Incumbent
- Assumed office August 3, 2023
- Preceded by: Smaine Younousse

Commander-in-Chief of the Gendarmerie Nationale
- In office March 31, 2023 – August 2, 2023
- Preceded by: Chekou Kore Lawel
- Succeeded by: Karimou Hima Abdoulaye

Governor of Tillaberi Region
- In office 2010–2011
- Succeeded by: Youssoufa Mamadou Maiga

Personal details
- Born: June 3, 1961 (age 65) Zinder, Niger
- Party: CNSP (since 2023)

Military service
- Rank: Brigadier general
- Battles/wars: Rwandan civil war (1995); Mali War (2014–2017); Haitian gang war (2017–2019); Islamist insurgency in Niger (2022-present)

Mahamadou Ibrahim Bagadoma is a Nigerien politician and gendarme currently serving as the governor of Diffa Region since 2023. Between March and August 2023, he served as commander-in-chief of the Gendarmerie Nationale.

== Biography ==
Bagadoma was born on June 3, 1961, in Zinder, Niger. He completed his primary and secondary studies in Zinder, and later attended the University of Niamey. He joined the Gendarmerie Nationale in 1983. Between 1986 and 1988, he attended the Armed Forces Officers' School in Bouaké, Ivory Coast. He also completed training courses in the United States, Tunisia, and the War College in Paris.

=== Military career ===
Bagadoma served as a gendarme in several UN missions, beginning with UNAMIR in Rwanda in 1995. In 2002, he became the commander of the 3rd Gendarmerie Legion based in Zinder, then deputy commander-in-chief of the entire gendarmerie. His first political stint was as Governor of Tillabéri Region from 2010 to 2011, as a lieutenant colonel. From 2014 to 2017, Bagadoma was a police officer in MINUSMA in Mali. He was then transferred to Haiti, where he served as the deputy police chief in MINUSTAH and MINUJUSTH between 2017 and 2019. From 2019 to 2022, he held top planning positions in the Ministry of Defense and in 2022 was the deputy secretary general in the MoD.

A few days after being promoted to brigadier general, Bagadoma was appointed commander-in-chief of the Gendarmerie Nationale on March 31, 2023, succeeding Chekou Kore Lawel. After the 2023 Nigerien coup d'état in July, Bagadoma was appointed Governor of Diffa Region on August 3, being replaced as commander of the gendarmerie by Karimou Hima Abdoulaye.

=== Gubernatorial career ===
When Bagadoma first arrived to his post in Diffa, he met with outgoing governor Smaine Younousse and local civil society and political officials. Early on in his post in 2023, Bagadoma established disaster preparedness and response mechanisms in Diffa Region, which were crucial in assisting 30,000 people during heavy flooding in 2025. In January 2024, he spearheaded a new program to increase agricultural productivity, similar to Iro Oumarou in Dosso. By July 2025, this program was seeing success.

As governor of Diffa, Bagadoma has coordinated with governors and regional leaders in Chad, Nigeria, and Cameroon against the omnipresent threat of Boko Haram and ISWAP, despite the Nigerien government's withdrawal from the Multinational Joint Task Force. However, Bagadoma accused the Nigerian government of interfering in Niger, saying in 2025 "there can only be cooperation and coordination when Nigerian interference and sabotage against his counntry stopped." He even accused Nigeria of harboring French troops to attack Niger, a claim oft-repeated by Nigerian junta authorities.

=== Personal life ===
Bagadoma is married and has six children.
