= Chetimari =

- Commune and village
- Location in Niger
- Coordinates: 13°12′23″N 12°25′16″E
- Country: Niger
- Region: Diffa Region
- Department: Diffa Department

Area
  - Total: 955 sq mi (2,474 km^{2})
- Elevation: 925 ft (282 m)

Population (2012 census)
  - Total: 65,449
  - Density: 68.52/sq mi (26.45/km^{2})
- Time zone: UTC+1 (WAT)

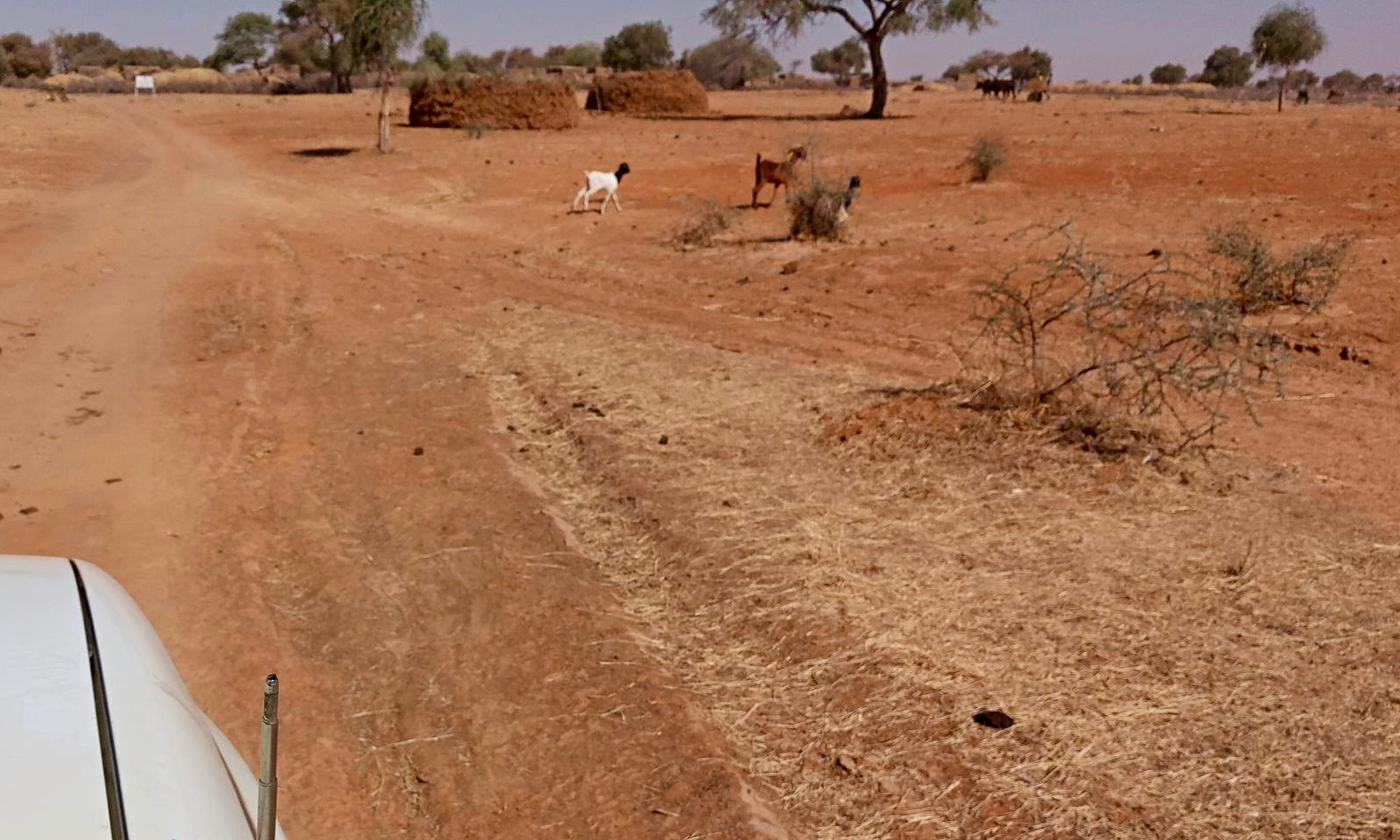
Animals along the road in Chetimari

Chetimari is a large village and rural commune in Niger, located along National Highway 1, several kilometres north of the Nigerian border. As of 2011, the commune had a population of 65,449.
