= N'guigmi =

N'guigmi Nguigmi, Ngigmi
- City
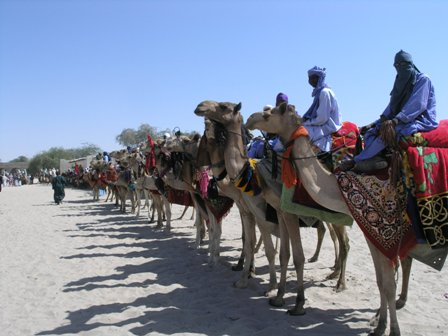
- Camel riders line up outside the residence of the traditional chief of Nguigmi

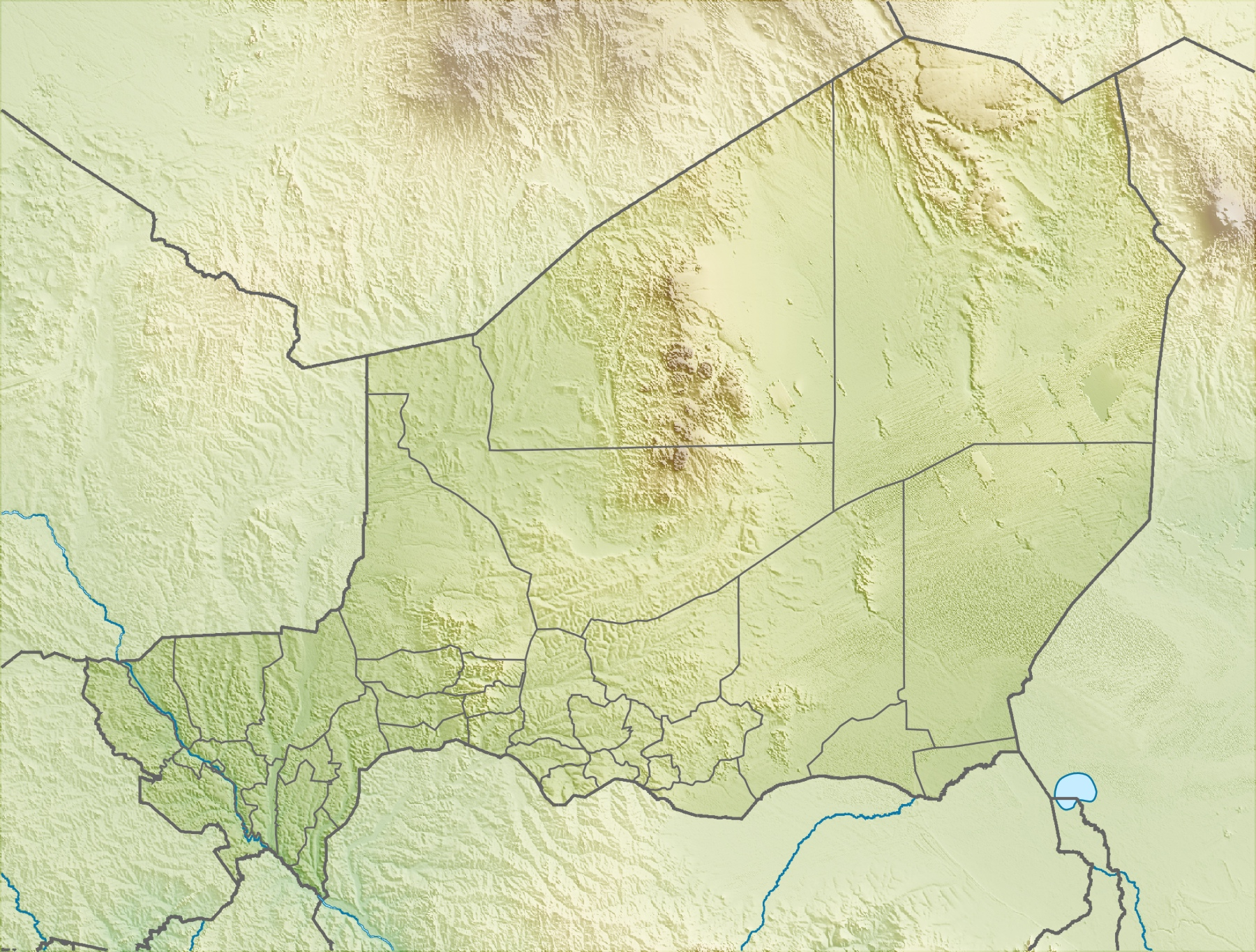
- Location in Niger
- Coordinates: 14°15′10″N 13°06′39″E
- Country: Niger
- Region: Diffa Region
- Department: N'guigmi Department
- Commune: Nguigmi

Area
  - Total: 3,134 km^{2} (1,210 sq mi)
- Elevation: 297 m (974 ft)

Population (2012 census)
  - Total: 47,198
  - Density: 15.06/km^{2} (39.01/sq mi)
- Time zone: UTC+01:00 (WAT)

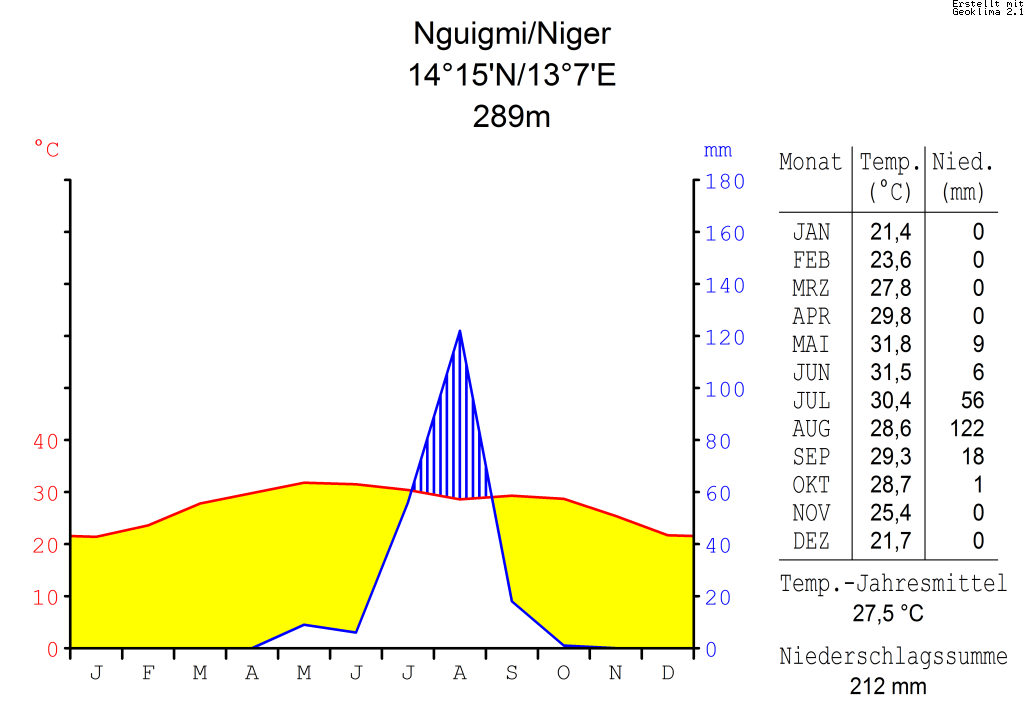
Metric temperature & rainfall diagram for N'guigmi (in German). Shows average daytime high of 27.5 degrees Celsius, total yearly rainfall average of 212 millimetres.

N'guigmi is a city and commune of 40,000 in the easternmost part of Niger, very near to Lake Chad – lying on its shore until the lake retreated. It is a crossroads for the traditional camel caravans of the Tuareg and for traders plying North and South across the Sahara.

== Overview ==
N'guigmi is a military centre for the region, a centre for the salt trade from Kaourar and is the last stop on the road to Chad. It is "the end of the road" and marks the end of the paved section of the Nigerien Route Nationale 1, although the sections past Diffa are notorious for their poor condition. Two unpaved highways or caravan routes connect to N'guigmi from the north, providing the main road route between Chad and Niger, and one of two land routes to the Kaourar Oasis town of Bilma.

The town lies at the mouth of the Dilia Bosso, an ancient river valley and seasonal wash that runs from the Termit Massif over 200 km to the northwest to what was the shore of Lake Chad as recently as the mid 20th century. The town was then a centre of Kanuri fishing communities. By the 2000s, even during the rainy season, the nearest access to water was at the village of Doro (a Beri-beri name for "Fishing port") 45 km southwest of N'guigmi. During the Sahel drought of the mid-1970s the shore was 85 km away from N'guigmi in Chad.

The town is the seat of the Department of N'guigmi, one of three in Diffa Region, which includes the entire north of the Region. N'guigmi is home to a large settlement of Kanuri people, as well as settled members of the traditionally pastoral Wodaabe-Fulani and Daza/Toubou ethnic groups.

== Climate ==
Climate data for N'Guigmi (1961–1990)
Month	Jan	Feb	Mar	Apr	May	Jun	Jul	Aug	Sep	Oct	Nov	Dec	Year
Mean maximum °C (°F)	34.0 (93.2)	38.0 (100.4)	41.3 (106.3)	43.8 (110.8)	43.8 (110.8)	43.7 (110.7)	41.7 (107.1)	39.6 (103.3)	40.6 (105.1)	40.3 (104.5)	37.6 (99.7)	34.6 (94.3)	43.8 (110.8)
Mean daily maximum °C (°F)	28.7 (83.7)	32.0 (89.6)	36.0 (96.8)	39.7 (103.5)	40.7 (105.3)	40.0 (104.0)	37.2 (99.0)	35.3 (95.5)	37.3 (99.1)	37.4 (99.3)	33.3 (91.9)	30.0 (86.0)	35.6 (96.1)
Daily mean °C (°F)	20.7 (69.3)	23.5 (74.3)	27.7 (81.9)	31.3 (88.3)	32.7 (90.9)	32.6 (90.7)	30.9 (87.6)	29.6 (85.3)	30.4 (86.7)	29.4 (84.9)	25.3 (77.5)	21.8 (71.2)	28.0 (82.4)
Mean daily minimum °C (°F)	12.8 (55.0)	15.1 (59.2)	19.4 (66.9)	22.9 (73.2)	24.5 (76.1)	25.0 (77.0)	24.6 (76.3)	23.7 (74.7)	23.5 (74.3)	21.5 (70.7)	17.2 (63.0)	13.6 (56.5)	20.3 (68.5)
Mean minimum °C (°F)	8.3 (46.9)	10.1 (50.2)	13.7 (56.7)	17.2 (63.0)	19.9 (67.8)	20.7 (69.3)	20.1 (68.2)	20.1 (68.2)	20.1 (68.2)	17.0 (62.6)	12.6 (54.7)	9.2 (48.6)	8.3 (46.9)
Average precipitation mm (inches)	0.0 (0.0)	0.0 (0.0)	0.1 (0.00)	0.6 (0.02)	4.9 (0.19)	10.9 (0.43)	55.3 (2.18)	100.3 (3.95)	14.8 (0.58)	0.6 (0.02)	0.0 (0.0)	0.0 (0.0)	187.5 (7.38)
Mean monthly sunshine hours	285.2	271.6	279.0	273.0	300.7	285.0	269.7	254.2	261.0	297.6	294.0	294.5	3,358
Mean daily sunshine hours	9.2	9.7	9.0	9.1	9.7	9.5	8.7	8.2	8.7	9.6	9.8	9.5	9.2
Source: NOAA

== Notable residents ==
- Mariama Djibrine, activist.
