= N'guigmi Department =

Coordinates: 14°14′58″N 13°06′33″E

N'guigmi
- Department
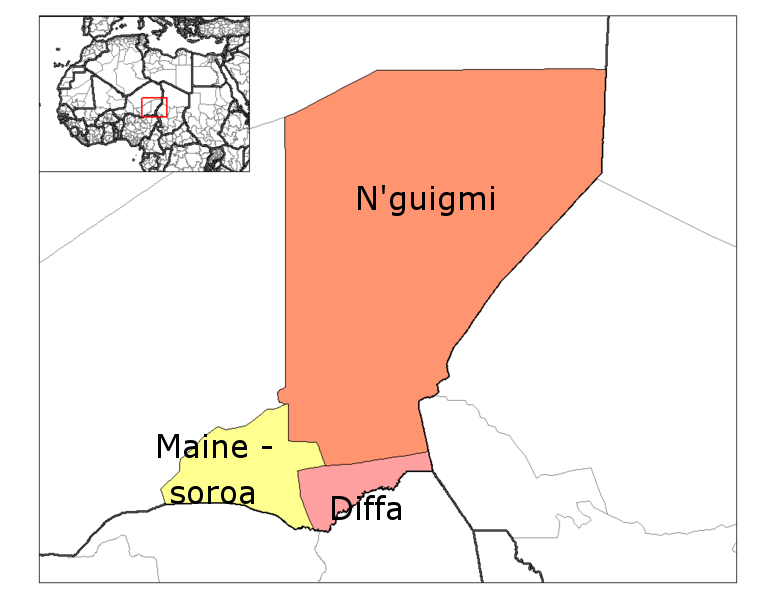
- N'guigmi Department location in the region
- Country: Niger
- Region: Diffa Region

Population
  - Total: 77,748
- Time zone: UTC+1 (GMT 1)

N'guigmi is a department of the Diffa Region in Niger. Its capital lies at the city of N'guigmi. As of 2011, the department had a total population of 77,748 people.
