= Iro Oumarou =

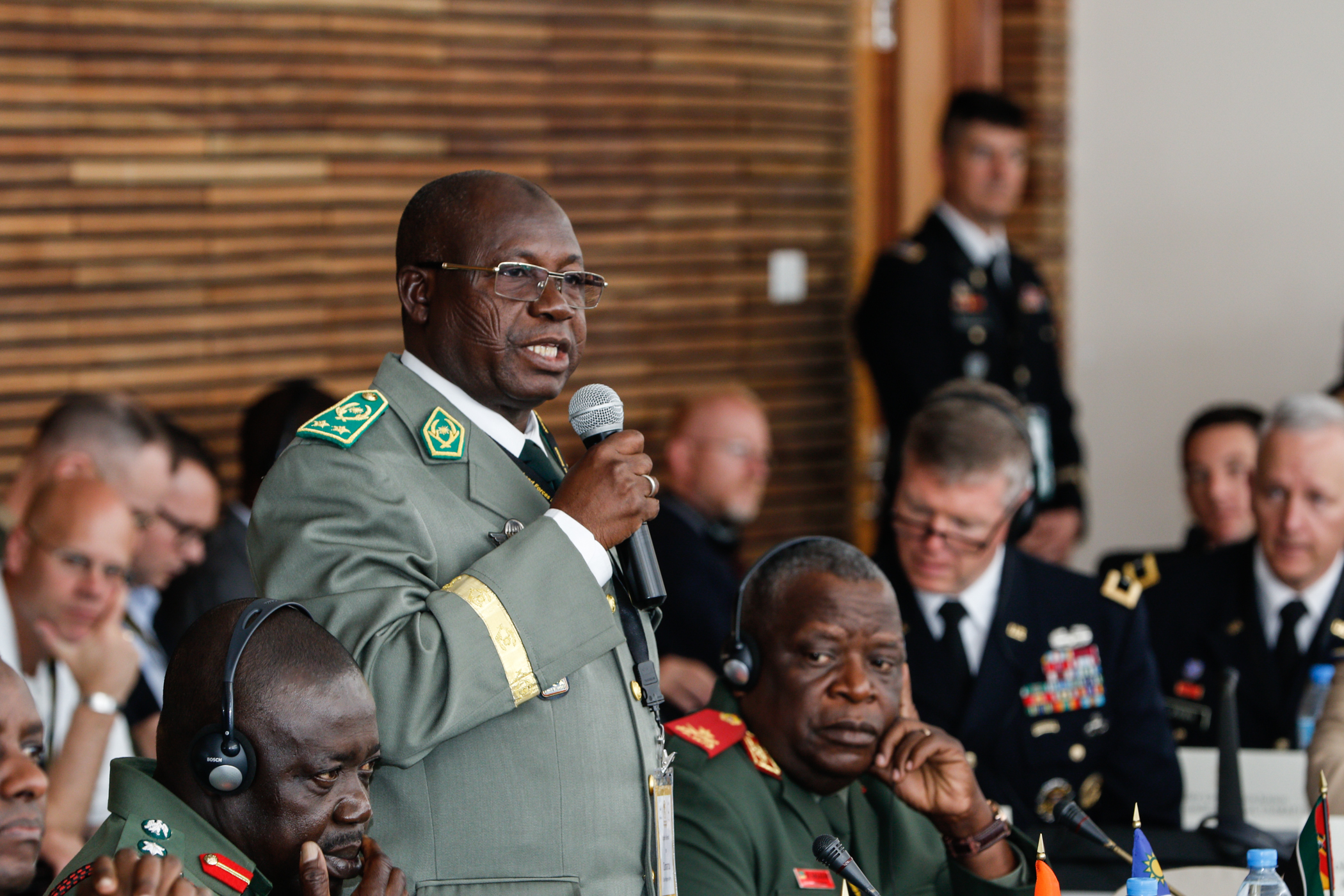
- Oumarou in Tanzania, 2016

Governor of Dosso Region
- In office August 2, 2023 – January 19, 2025
- Preceded by: Elhadj Albachir Aboubacar
- Succeeded by: Bana Alhassane

Chief of Staff of the Nigerien Army
- In office December 22, 2014 – January 13, 2018

Chief of Staff to the President
- In office January 13, 2018 – August 2, 2023
- Preceded by: Ibra Boulama

Personal details
- Party: National Council for the Safeguard of the Homeland

Military service
- Branch/service: Nigerien Armed Forces
- Rank: Brigadier General

Iro Oumarou is a Nigerien soldier and brigadier general who served as the governor of Dosso Region from 2023 to 2025. Oumarou is part of the National Council for the Safeguard of the Homeland, which took power in the 2023 Nigerien coup d'état. He served as Chief of Staff of the Nigerien Army from 2018 to 2023.

== Biography ==
In 2010, Oumarou said at an event in Washington, D.C. with the G8 that Niger wanted more intelligence gathering aid, military training, and specialized equipment to eradicate Al-Qaeda in the Islamic Maghreb. Throughout his military career, Oumarou has been trained by the United States.

Oumarou first served as Deputy Chief of Staff of the Nigerien Army after the 2010 Nigerien coup d'état by Salou Djibo that ousted Mamadou Tandja. Prior to the coup, he was an officer in the Nigerien Armed Forces, after the coup he was appointed colonel. In 2016, he was commander of the Nigerien Army's ground forces. He commanded Tillabéri Region's defense zone. On January 13, 2018, Oumarou was appointed Chief of Staff of the President by President Mahamadou Issoufou, succeeding Ibra Boulama.

Following the 2023 Nigerien coup d'état, Oumarou was appointed Governor of Dosso Region by the putschists. Other top U.S.-trained officials, like Oumarou Tawaye, Labo Issoufou, and Issoufou Mamane all received gubernatorial positions. Oumarou first arrived in Dosso on August 11, 2023, in the village of Deytagui, where he was met by outgoing governor Elhadj Abachir Aboubacar and mayor of Dosso Abdou Madougou. The second government session for Dosso Region began in September 2023, chaired by Oumarou.

In April 2024, Oumarou was part of a UN-backed initiative to support digital human rights activists. In September 2024, Oumarou chaired a meeting in Dosso Region to kickstart a peace and security initiative and alleviate tensions between farmers and pastoralists. In an interview with the newspaper Le Sahel, Oumarou confirmed that Dosso Region had seen an uptick in militant activity and smuggling from Nigeria and Burkina Faso. An agricultural campaign embarked on by Oumarou in the region failed due to unusually heavy rains which caused flooding.

On January 19, 2025, Oumarou was dismissed as governor and replaced by Colonel-Major Bana Alhassane. He met with Alhassane in the village of Deytagui, where his predecessor handed off the governorship to him just over a year prior. Local NGOs and politicians attennded the event.

In April 2026, Oumarou spoke to the graduating class of the EFOFAN military academy alongside Salifou Modi.
