= Issoufou Mamane =

Governor of Maradi Region
- Incumbent
- Assumed office August 1, 2023
- Preceded by: Chaibou Aboubacar

Personal details
- Party: CNSP (since 2023)

Issoufou Mamane is a Nigerien politician currently serving as the governor of Maradi Region since 2023.

== Biography ==
Prior to the 2023 Nigerien coup d'état, Mamane was Police Commissioner of Maradi Region. He was appointed governor by the new Nigerian junta CNSP on August 1, and was inaugurated on August 9. He replaced outgoing governor Chaibou Aboubacar at a ceremony involving local sultans and leaders. Mamane praised the CNSP at a meeting with local security forces on August 29. In 2024, Mamane embarked on a campaign to end child marriage in the region, with 65% of women in Niger being married before 18. In 2025, Mamane said that the biggest threats while he had been governor were cross-border attacks from armed gangs along the Niger-Nigeria border and drug trafficking from these same networks. However, he said that Maradi was doing "relatively well" compared to other regions. According to him, his biggest achievement as governor was implementing a large-scale irrigation program.
