= Diffa Department =

Coordinates: 13°18′55″N 12°36′40″E

Diffa
- Department
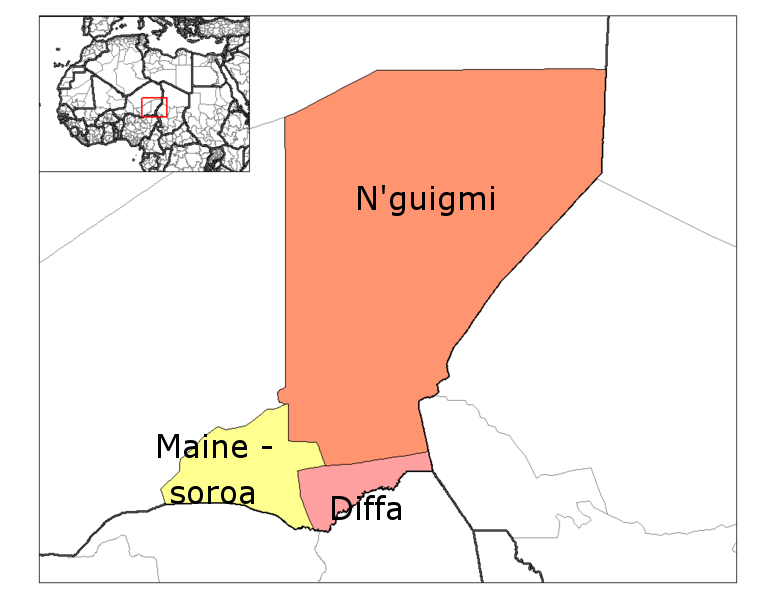
- Diffa Department location in the region
- Country: Niger
- Region: Diffa Region

Area
  - Total: 2,071 sq mi (5,365 km^{2})

Population (2012)
  - Total: 159,722
- Time zone: UTC+1 (GMT 1)

Diffa is a department of the Diffa Region in the extreme southeast of Niger. It is bordered by Chad to the east. Its capital lies at the city of Diffa. As of 2012, the department had a population of 209,249 people.

== Communes ==
- Chetimari
- Diffa
- Gueskerou
