= Gueskerou =

- Commune and village
- Location in Niger
- Coordinates: 13°31′43″N 12°50′35″E
- Country: Niger
- Region: Diffa Region
- Department: Diffa Department

Area
  - Total: 979 sq mi (2,535 km^{2})

Population (2012 census)
  - Total: 37,836
  - Density: 38.66/sq mi (14.93/km^{2})
- Time zone: UTC+1 (WAT)

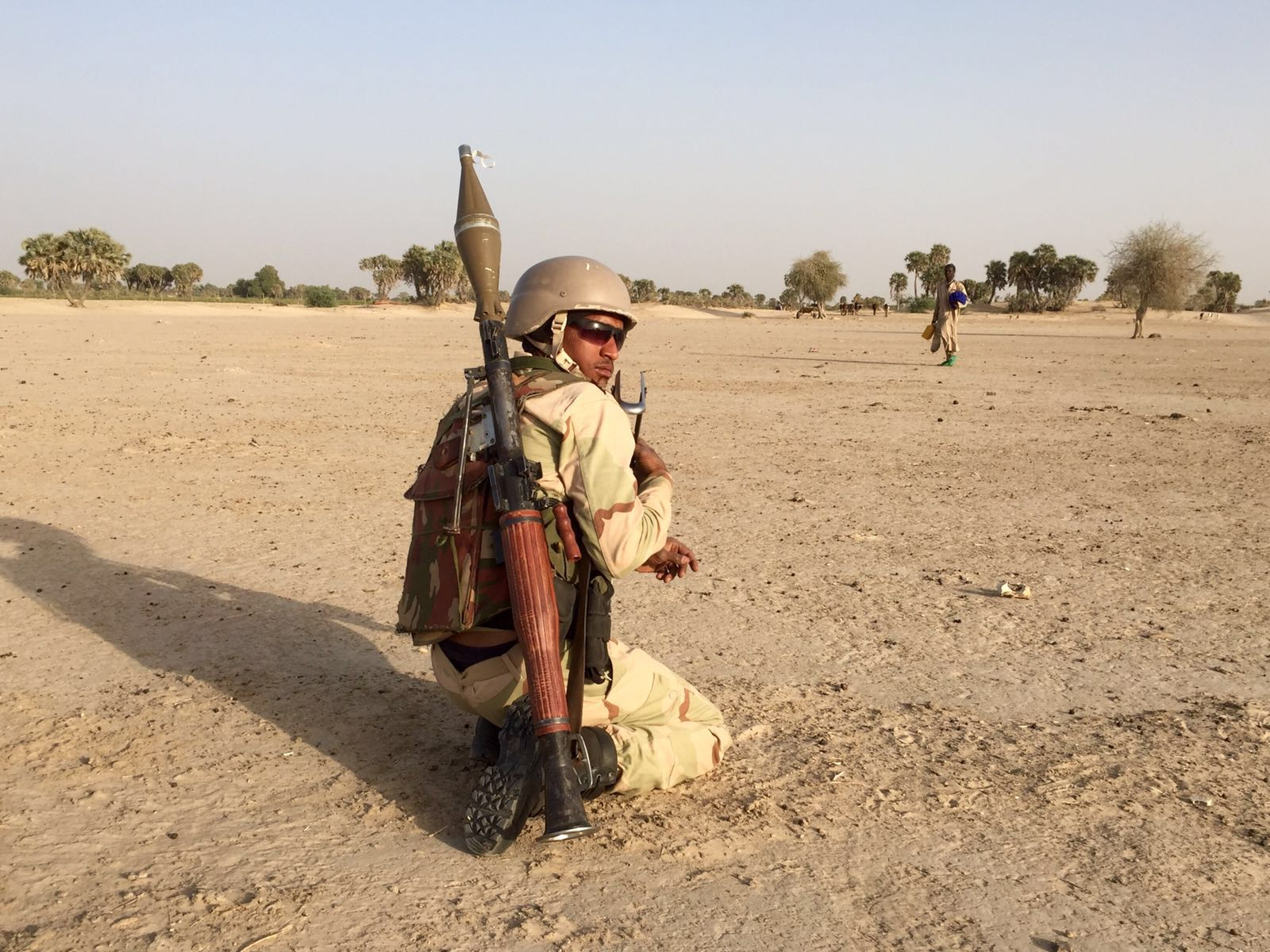

Gueskerou is a village and commune in southeastern Niger. As of 2012, the commune's population was 37,836 people.
