= Damasak massacre =

Series of massacres and executions in Damask, Nigeria

- Part of the Boko Haram insurgency
- Location: 13.1082°N 12.5093°E; Damasak, Nigeria
- Date: November 24, 2014– March 17, 2015
- Attack type: Massacre
- Deaths: 400
- Perpetrator: Boko Haram

The Damasak massacre was a series of massacres and mass execution committed by Boko Haram in the city of Damasak, Nigeria.

== Attack ==
On 24 November 2014, Boko Haram invaded and captured the city of Damasak, Nigeria in retaliation for civilians joining self-defense groups. The inhabitants of the city fled the advancing Boko haram jihadists. About 3,000 civilians left the city and fled to neighboring Niger. They crossed the Yobe River bordering the two countries on the boat, many civilians died attempting to swim across the Yobe river. Boko Haram started hunting down people fleeing the city and killing them, by the end of the attack estimated 50 people had been killed.

== Occupation ==
Boko haram occupied the town for four months, during that four months Boko haram committed several mass executions in and around the city of Damasak. Seventy to one hundred people were killed, with some being beheaded under a concrete bridge leading out of the city. Hundreds more were killed in the dried-up river bank and other parts of the town. By the end of the occupation on 17 March 2015, 400 civilians had been executed by Boko haram.

== Liberation ==
On 17 March 2015, the Nigerien and Chadian armies launch an operation to recapture the city of Damasak. Over 2,000 Nigerian and Chadian soldiers attacked the city and recaptured it. the battle left multiple Boko haram vehicles destroyed and 228 Boko haram fighters dead.
