= Seyni Garba =

Nigerien army general (born 1953)

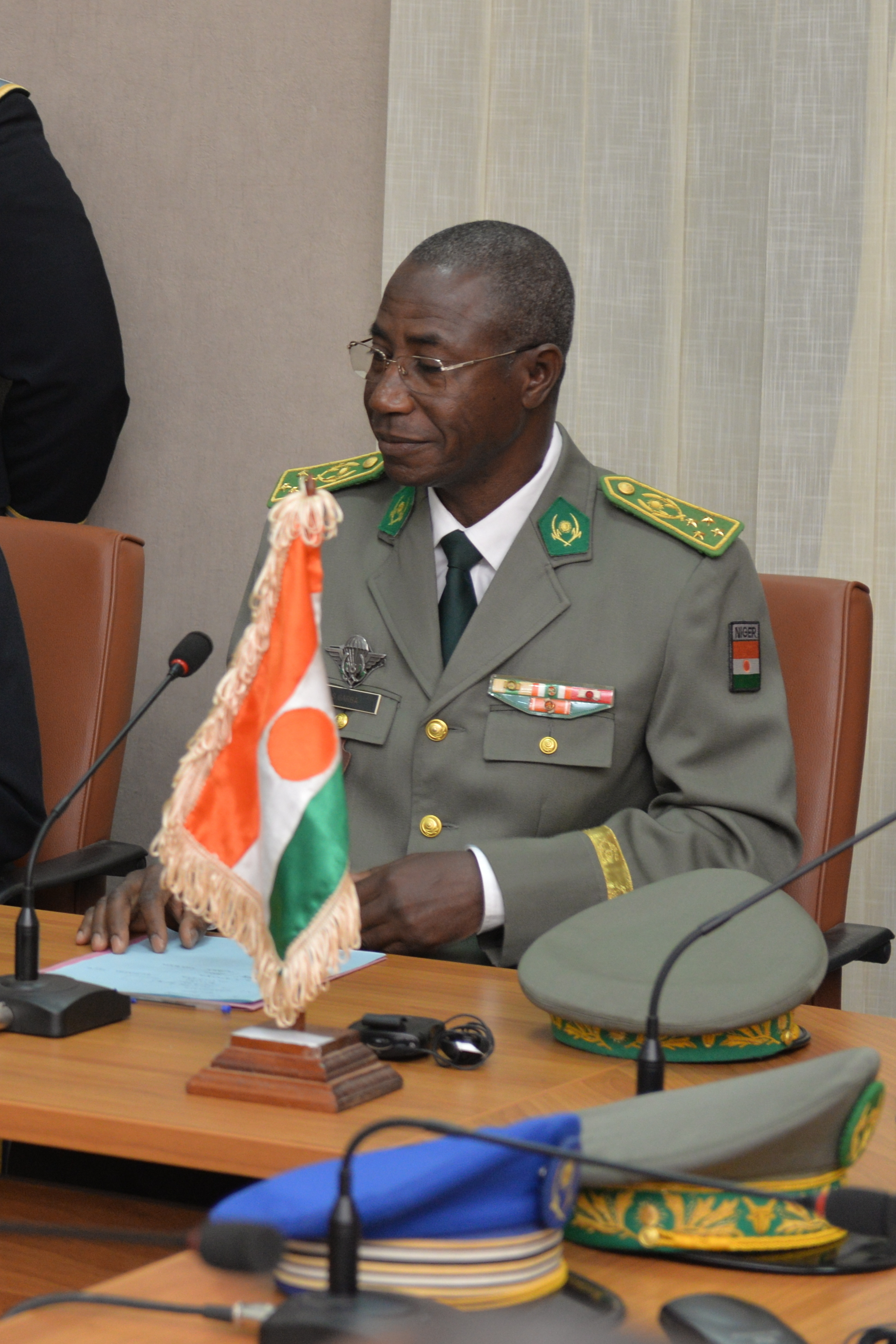
- Seyni Garba in 2017
- Born: January 1, 1953 (age 73); Garankedey, Dosso Region, Niger
- Education: Korombé High School
- Children: 5
- Military career
- Allegiance: Niger
- Branch: Army
- Rank: General

Major General Seyni Garba (born 1 January 1953, in Garankedey, Dosso Region, Niger) is a Nigerien army general. He completed his primary and secondary education at Dosso and at the Korombé High School in Niamey between 1966 and 1974, before attending the Abdou Moumouni University in Niamey, Maths-Physics section in 1974. He is the joint chief of staff of the Niger Armed Forces since 2011, where he leads the fight against Boko Haram. He is married and has five children.
