= Toumour =

- Commune and village
- Location in Niger
- Coordinates: 13°40′N 13°08′E
- Country: Niger
- Region: Diffa
- Department: Bosso

Area
  - Total: 27.08 sq mi (70.13 km^{2})

Population (2012 census)
  - Total: 11,713
  - Density: 432.6/sq mi (167.0/km^{2})
- Time zone: UTC+1 (WAT)

Toumour is a village and rural commune in Niger located near the Niger–Nigeria border. As of 2012, the commune had a total population of 11,713 people.

On September 4, 2016, clashes near the village killed at least 30 Boko Haram militants and five soldiers. The armed forces said Boko Haram attacked their military post on March 15, 2020, which they responded to by repelling the attack, killing 50 insurgents. Boko Haram claimed responsibility for the December 12, 2020 massacre of 27 people in Toumour. About 60% of the village was burned, and more killings before Christmas were threatened. The terrorists are said to have crossed Lake Chad by swimming.
