= Mainé-Soroa Department =

Coordinates: 13°12′41″N 12°01′26″E

Mainé-Soroa
- Department
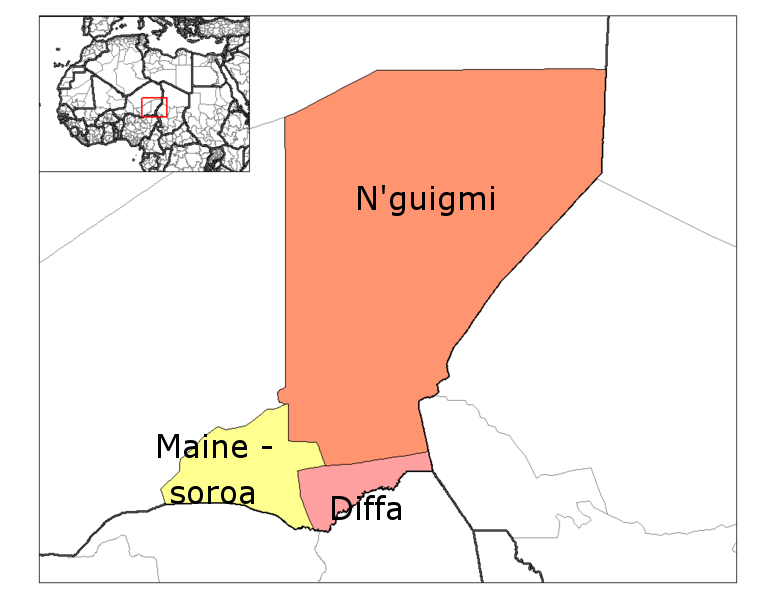
- Mainé-Soroa Department location in the region
- Country: Niger
- Region: Diffa Region

Area
  - Total: 2,909 sq mi (7,534 km^{2})

Population (2012 census)
  - Total: 131,664
  - Density: 45.26/sq mi (17.48/km^{2})
- Time zone: UTC+1 (GMT 1)

Mainé-Soroa is a department of the Diffa Region in Niger. Its capital lies at the city of Mainé-Soroa.

The department's population is largely made up of ethnic Kanouris and Fula, both cultures with longstanding pastoral semi-nomadic traditions. As of 2012, the department had a total population of 131,664 people.

== Communes ==
- Foulatari
- Mainé-Soroa
- N'Guelbély
