= Borno State House of Assembly =

Legislative arm of the government of Borno State of Nigeria

The Borno State House of Assembly is the legislative arm of the government of Borno State of Nigeria. It is a unicameral legislature with 28 legislators elected from 27 local government areas (state constituencies). Local government areas with considerably larger populations are delineated into two constituencies to give equal representation. This brings the number of state constituencies in Borno State to 28. The fundamental functions of the Assembly are to enact new laws, amend or repeal existing laws and oversight of the executive. Members of the assembly are elected for a term of four years concurrent with federal legislators (Senate and House of Representatives) and the state governor. The state assembly convenes three times a week (Tuesdays, Wednesdays and Thursdays) for plenary sessions in the assembly complex within the state capital, Maiduguri.

The current speaker of the 10th Borno State House of Assembly is Abdulkarim Lawan.
