= Mainé-Soroa =

Maïné-Soroa
- Location within Niger
- Coordinates: 13°31′04″N 12°01′36″E
- Country: Niger
- Region: Diffa Region
- Department: Maïné-Soroa

Area
  - City: 3,443 km^{2} (1,329 sq mi)
- Elevation: 287 m (942 ft)

Population (2012 census)
  - City: 78,735
  - Urban: 13,136

Mainé-Soroa (Maine-Soroa, Maïné-Soroa) is a town in southeastern Niger, the capital of the Mainé-Soroa Department, and is in turn part of Diffa Region. The town's population was 78,735 at the 2012 census.

== Economy ==
Situated in an agropastoral zone, most of Mainé-Soroa's population survive by farming and stockraising. As much of the Sahel region Niger, Mainé-Soroa farmers work under the threat of desertification.

The town is also known as the birthplace of the former President of Niger, Tanja Mamadou.

== Transport ==
=== Airport ===
The town has an airport, international code DRZM, with an unpaved 3900 ft/1189m runway.

=== Climate ===
Climate data for Mainé-Soroa (1961–1990)
Month	Jan	Feb	Mar	Apr	May	Jun	Jul	Aug	Sep	Oct	Nov	Dec	Year
Mean maximum °C (°F)	35.3 (95.5)	38.4 (101.1)	42.2 (108.0)	43.9 (111.0)	43.6 (110.5)	42.9 (109.2)	39.8 (103.6)	37.2 (99.0)	39.8 (103.6)	40.3 (104.5)	37.9 (100.2)	35.9 (96.6)	43.9 (111.0)
Mean daily maximum °C (°F)	29.9 (85.8)	33.2 (91.8)	37.3 (99.1)	40.7 (105.3)	41.1 (106.0)	39.1 (102.4)	35.1 (95.2)	33.4 (92.1)	36.0 (96.8)	37.8 (100.0)	34.3 (93.7)	31.1 (88.0)	35.8 (96.4)
Daily mean °C (°F)	21.4 (70.5)	24.4 (75.9)	28.6 (83.5)	32.3 (90.1)	33.3 (91.9)	32.2 (90.0)	29.4 (84.9)	28.0 (82.4)	29.4 (84.9)	29.6 (85.3)	25.7 (78.3)	22.4 (72.3)	28.1 (82.6)
Mean daily minimum °C (°F)	12.8 (55.0)	15.4 (59.7)	19.8 (67.6)	23.9 (75.0)	25.5 (77.9)	25.2 (77.4)	23.6 (74.5)	22.5 (72.5)	22.7 (72.9)	21.4 (70.5)	17.1 (62.8)	13.6 (56.5)	20.3 (68.5)
Mean minimum °C (°F)	8.8 (47.8)	10.8 (51.4)	14.4 (57.9)	18.5 (65.3)	21.6 (70.9)	20.4 (68.7)	19.9 (67.8)	19.7 (67.5)	20.0 (68.0)	18.3 (64.9)	12.8 (55.0)	9.4 (48.9)	8.8 (47.8)
Average precipitation mm (inches)	0.0 (0.0)	0.0 (0.0)	0.1 (0.00)	1.1 (0.04)	7.4 (0.29)	28.6 (1.13)	101.2 (3.98)	149.4 (5.88)	46.8 (1.84)	8.1 (0.32)	0.0 (0.0)	0.0 (0.0)	342.6 (13.49)
Mean monthly sunshine hours	282.1	260.4	272.8	267.0	291.4	273.0	257.3	238.7	255.0	288.3	288.0	282.1	3,248.5
Mean daily sunshine hours	9.2	9.5	8.8	8.9	9.4	9.2	8.1	7.7	8.3	9.3	9.7	9.4	9.0
Source: NOAA
