= Diffa =

- Urban Commune
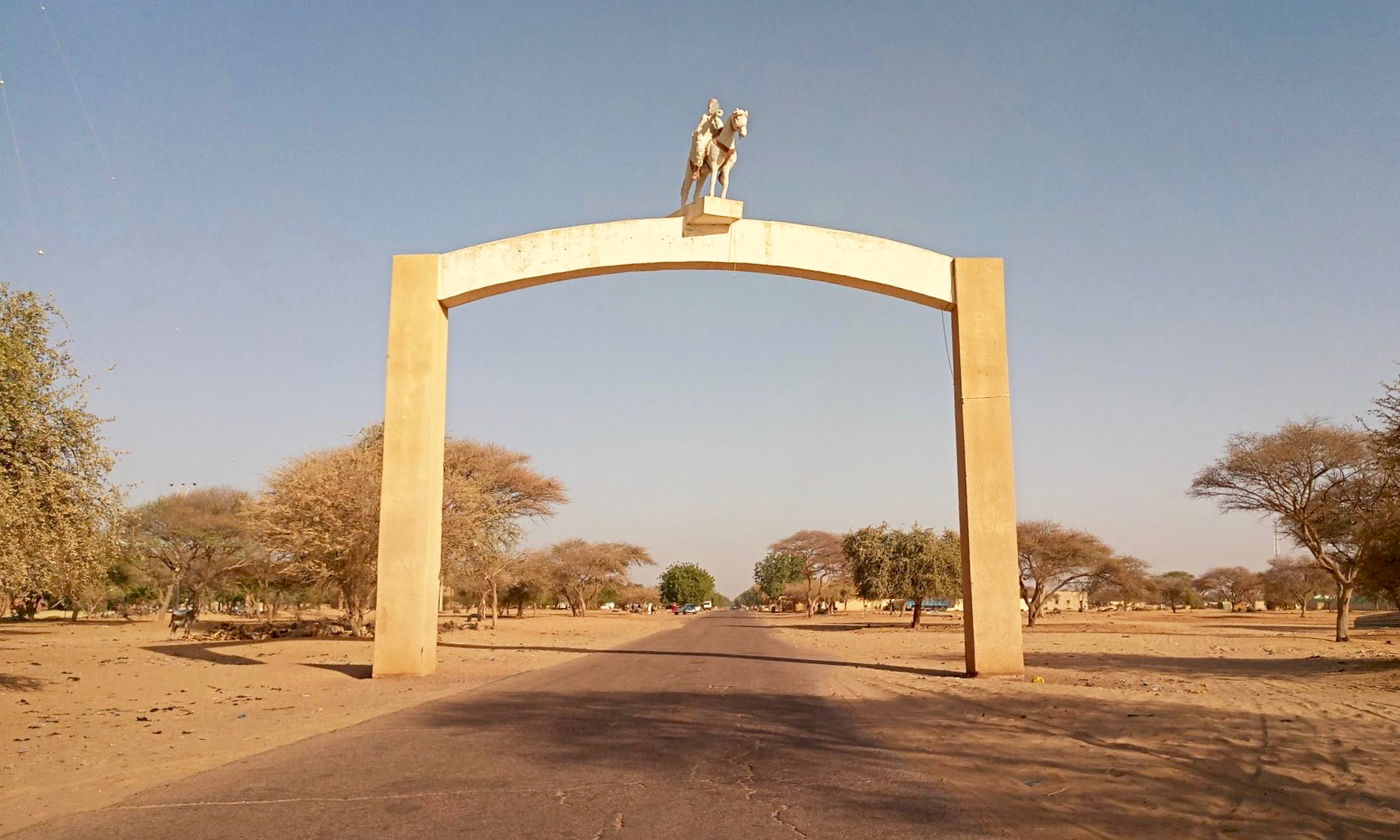

- Location in Niger
- Coordinates: 13°18′53″N 12°37′4″E
- Country: Niger
- Region: Diffa Region
- Department: Diffa Department
- Urban Commune: Diffa

Area
  - Urban Commune: 137.2 sq mi (355.4 km^{2})
- Elevation: 935 ft (285 m)

Population (2012 census)
  - Urban Commune: 56,437
  - Density: 411.3/sq mi (158.8/km^{2})
  - Urban: 39,960
- Time zone: UTC+1 (WAT)

Diffa is a city and urban commune in the extreme southeast of Niger, near the border with Nigeria. It is the administrative seat of both Diffa Region, and the smaller Diffa Department. As of 2012, the commune had a total population of 56,437 people.

== Health and social action ==
Since the late 1990s, the Campaner Foundation, founded by social activist Josep Campaner, has run noma prevention, diagnosis and care programmes in Diffa, alongside educational and shelter initiatives for vulnerable minors. These activities are delivered through shelters in Diffa and Niamey and an outpatient centre in Diffa, with complementary education projects in the capital. Support from RIU Hotels & Resorts, led by Carmen Riu, has included funding for local operations and specific fundraising campaigns. Noma is a rapidly progressive gangrenous disease that mainly affects children living in extreme poverty; in December 2023, the World Health Organization officially recognised noma as a neglected tropical disease.

== History ==
In 2002, it was the centre of the first military uprising in the country since President Tandja Mamadou instituted civilian rule. The uprising led to a government crackdown against the civilian press.

=== Nigerian refugees ===
In recent years, refugees from Nigeria fleeing violence from Boko Haram have settled in Diffa and surrounding area.

== Geography ==
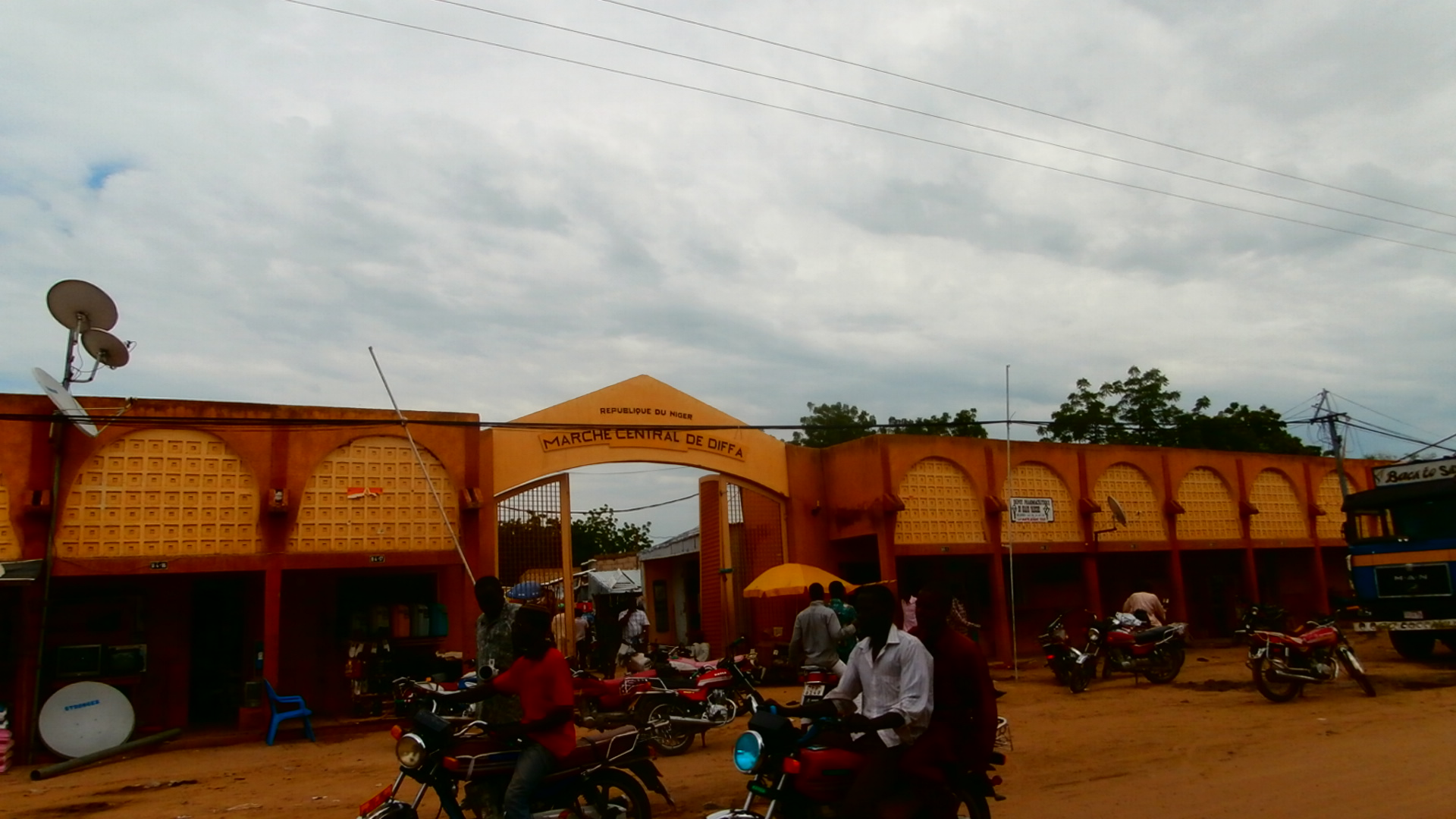
The Grand Marché

Diffa is situated on the north bank of the Komadougou Yobe river; the river's seasonal floodplain lies immediately to the south and east. Much of the riverbank is lined with gardens and small allotments which grow the town's well-known red peppers. The town is bisected in an arc by the Route Nationale 1 road; the eastern part of town is centred on the Grand Marché, which also acts as the transport hub for the city.

=== Climate ===
Diffa has a hot climate with a wet and dry season. On 7 September 1978, Diffa recorded a temperature of 49.5 °C (121.1 °F), which is the highest temperature to have ever been recorded in Niger.

== Architecture ==
=== Sports buildings ===
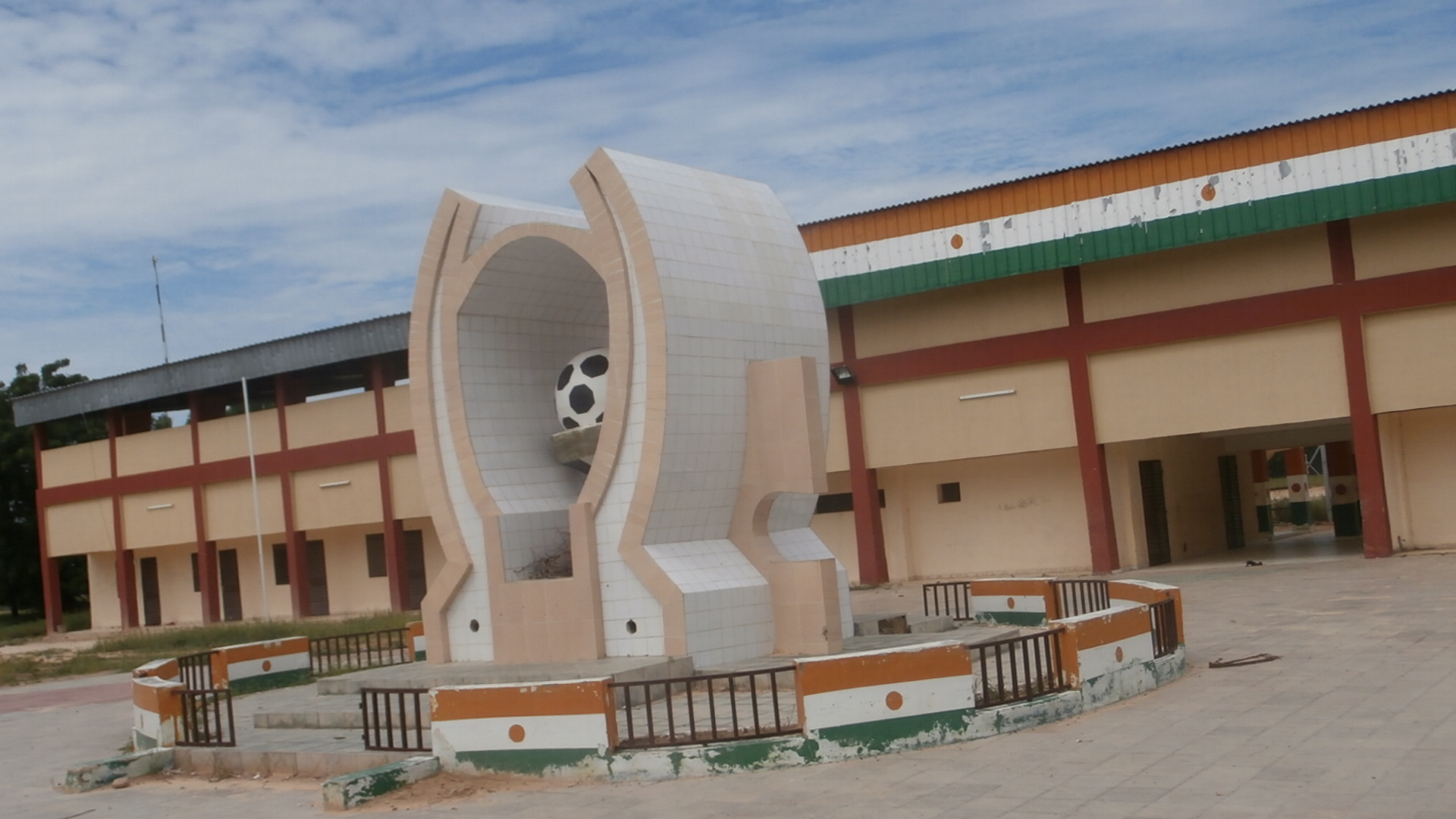
Stade de Diffa

A traditional wrestling arena is located to the northeast of the Grand Marché. Diffa Stadium can be found west of the RN1.

=== Religious buildings ===
The town contains several mosques, most notably the Grande Mosquée de Diffa on the RN1.

== Transport ==
Diffa marks the eastern end of the paved section of Route Nationale 1, the main east-west highway across Niger, although the section between Zinder and Diffa is only partially paved in places. RN1 continues north to N'guigmi more than 100 km. Maïné-Soroa, the other major town of the Region, lies less than 100 km to the west of Diffa. The border with Nigeria, at the Nigerian town of Duji, is 5.5 km to the south of Diffa. Diffa Airport lies to the north of the town.

== Gallery ==
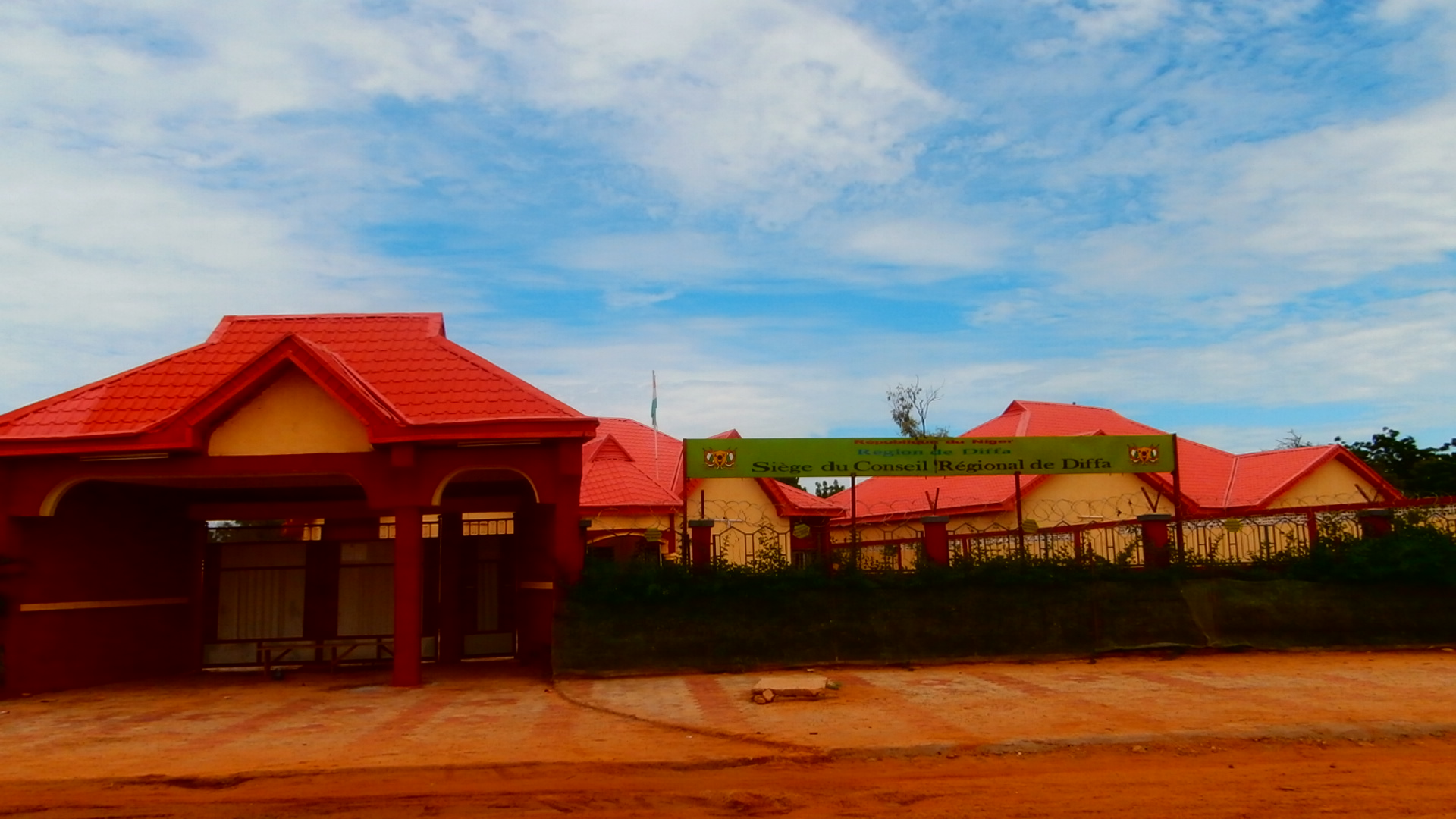
Headquarters of the Regional council

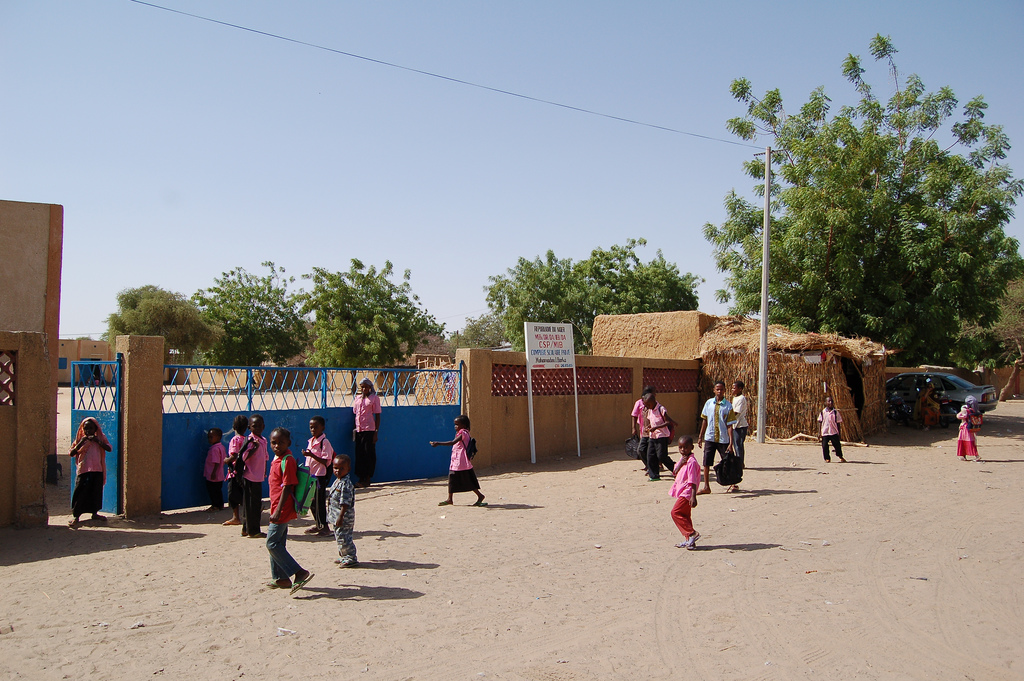
A school in Diffa

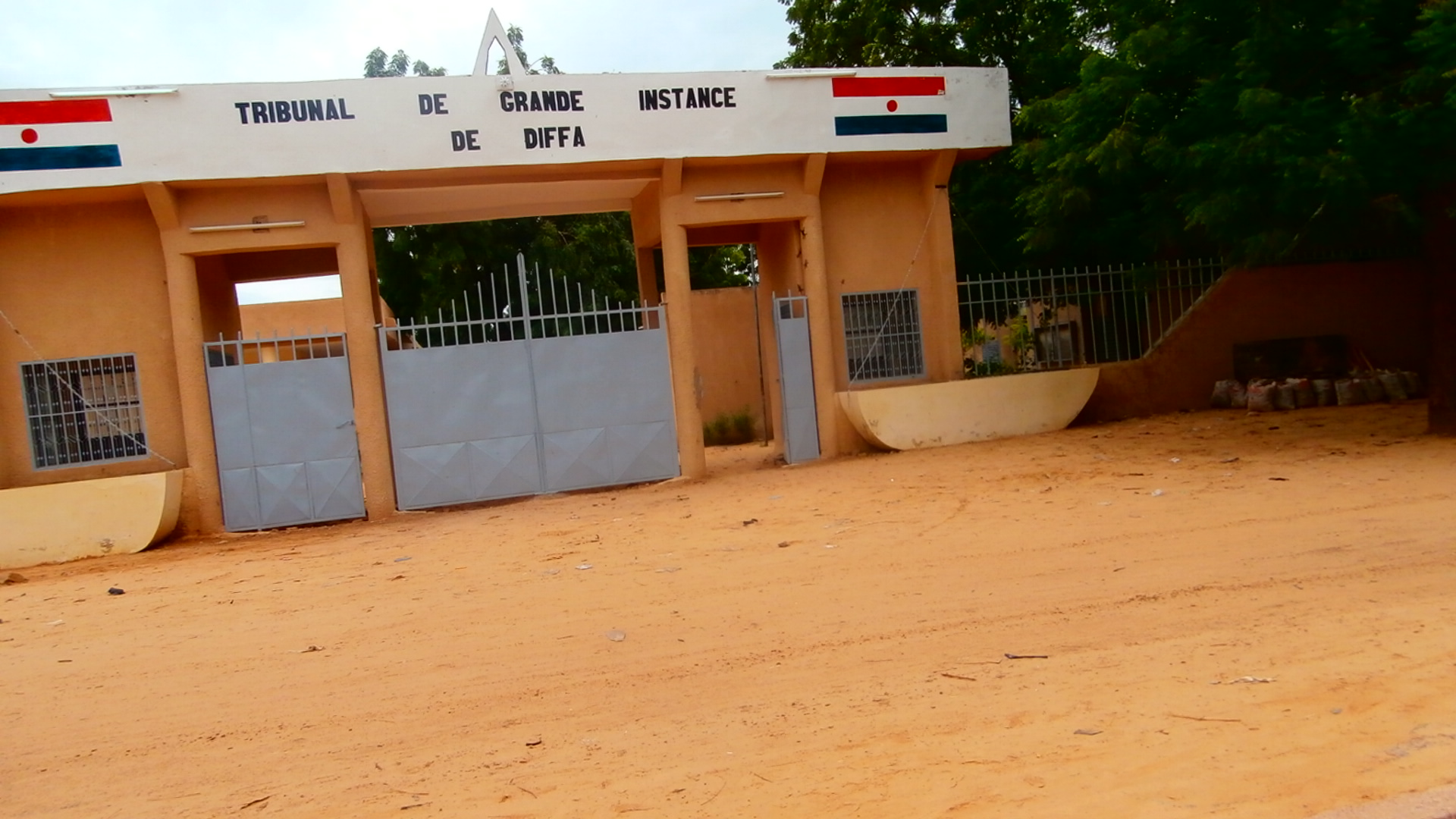
The Palais de Justice
