= Diffa Region =

Region of Niger

Diffa
- Region
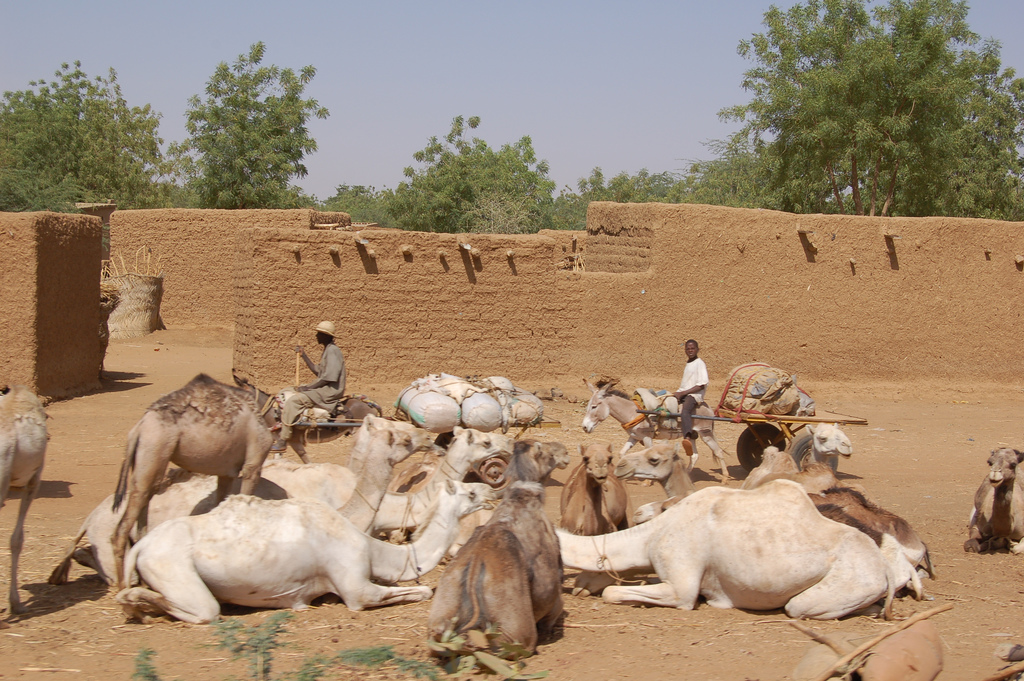
- Boys driving mule carts in Diffa Region

- Location within Niger
- Coordinates: 14°N 13°E
- Country: Niger
- Capital: Diffa

Government
  - Governor: Mahamadou Ibrahim Bagadoma

Area
  - Total: 156,906 km^{2} (60,582 sq mi)

Population (2020 estimate)
  - Total: 762,700
  - Density: 4.861/km^{2} (12.59/sq mi)
- Time zone: UTC+1 (West Africa Time)
- HDI (2021): 0.386 low · 5th of 7

Diffa is one of the seven regions of Niger, and is located in the southeast of the country. The capital of the region is Diffa.

== Geography ==
Diffa Region is situated in the extreme southeast of Niger between 10° 30’ and 15° 35’ longitude East and 13° 04’ and 18° 00’ latitude North. It covers 156 906 km², and it borders Agadez Region to the north, Chad to the east, Nigeria to the south, and Zinder Region to the west. The landscape is primarily Sahelian in the south, merging into the Sahara desert in the north of the region. In the far southeast can be found Niger's portion of Lake Chad; formerly extending as far west as N'guigmi, the lake has shrunk drastically in recent decades. In the southeast, the Komadougou Yobe river forms part of the border with Nigeria.

=== Settlements ===
Diffa is the regional capital. Other major settlements include Bosso, Chetimari, Dungass, Gueskerou, Goudoumaria, Kablewa, Mainé-Soroa, N'Gourti, N'Guelbély, N'guigmi and Toumour.

== Administrative subdivisions ==
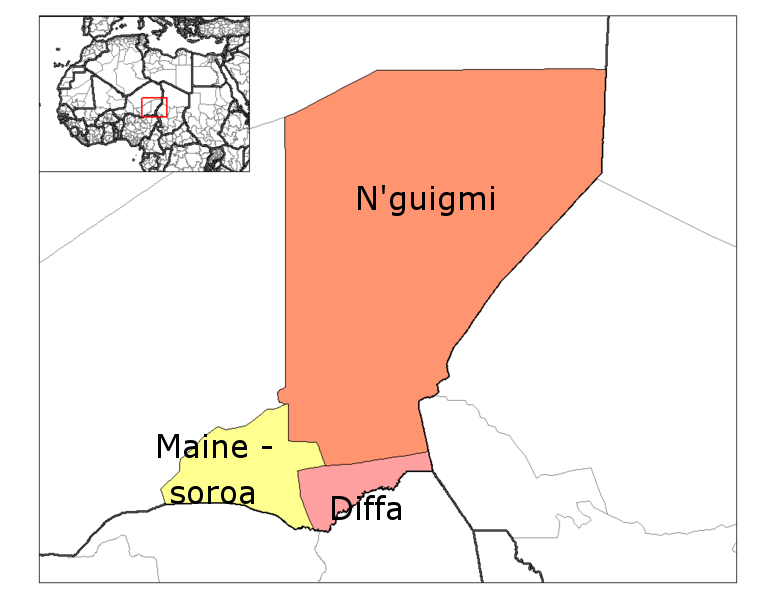
Departments of Diffa (Old borders)

Diffa Region is divided into six Departments:

- Bosso Department
- Diffa Department
- Goudoumaria Department
- Maine-soroa Department
- N'Gourti Department
- N'guigmi Department

The Region also includes three Urban Communes, a number of Rural Communes, four Cantons, and over twenty Groupments (administrative councils of nomadic communities). The Urban Communes are Diffa, Maïné-Soroa, N'guigmi; while the Rural Communes include Bosso, Chétimari, Goudoumaria, N'Gourti, Kabléwa, Nguel beyli, and Gueskérou.

== Demographics ==
The main ethnolinguistic groups in the region are Arabs, Fula, Hausa, Kanuri, Buduma, and Toubou.

Historical population
| Year | Pop. | ±% |
|---|---|---|
| 1977 | 167,382 | — |
| 1985 | 189,091 | +13.0% |
| 2001 | 346,595 | +83.3% |
| 2012 | 593,821 | +71.3% |

=== Refugees ===
Refugees from Nigeria fleeing violence from Boko Haram are living with local populations in the Diffa Region. As of June 11, 2014, the International Rescue Committee (IRC) estimated that as many as 1,000 refugees a week were crossing the border into Diffa region; four out of five were women and girls. By October 2015 the number of Nigerian refugees in the region had risen to at least 150,000. After a lull in the fighting in 2017-18, violence increased in 2019, further worsening an already fragile security situation.

== Economy ==
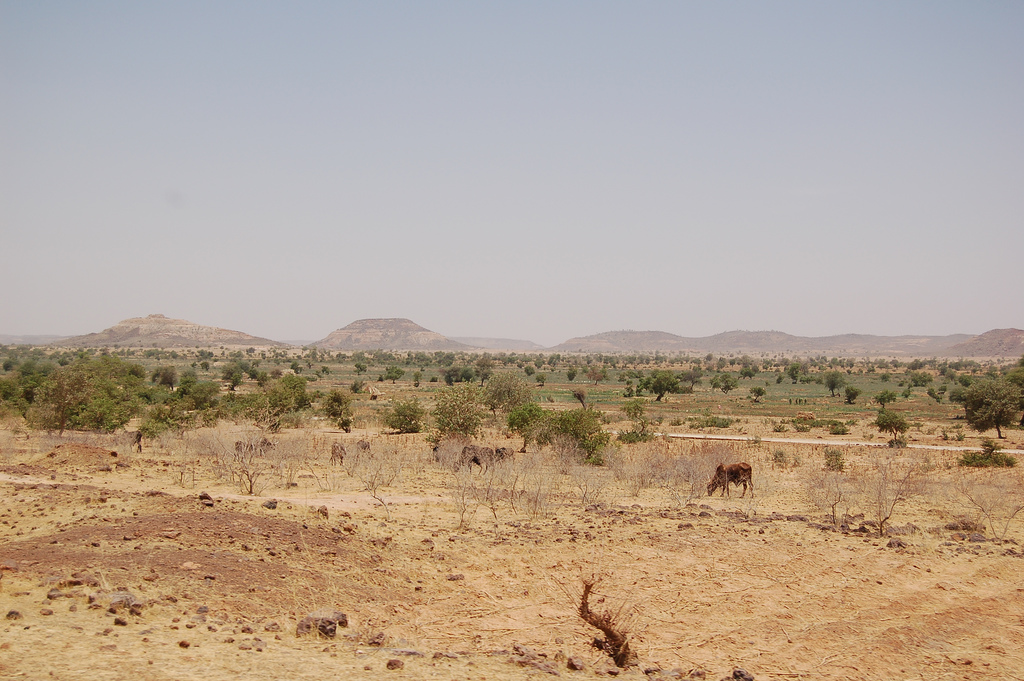
Landscape of rural Diffa Region, Niger, traveling on the main highway from Diffa to Niamey. (2006)

The economy of Diffa Region is primarily agricultural, primarily based upon livestock, while some of these are pastoralism and farming. The major crop, grown both for subsistence and sale, is millet, especially the drought-tolerant varieties. One third of arable land is devoted to farming: almost 105,000 hectares farmed of the 299,500 hectares of arable land. Areas of the east and south also grow rice and maize. Irrigation in the valleys around Maïné-Soroa make this possible, as does the edge of Lake Chad (3,000 km² in the far east) and the seasonal Komadougou Yobe river valley in the south. This river valley forms around 150 km of the border with Nigeria. Despite this, the Diffa Region is among the most unproductive agricultural areas in Niger, and all of West Africa, making it especially vulnerable to drought and famine.

== See also ==
- Regions of Niger
- Departments of Niger
- Communes of Niger
- 2010 Sahel famine
