= Bosso, Niger =

Bosso
- Commune and village
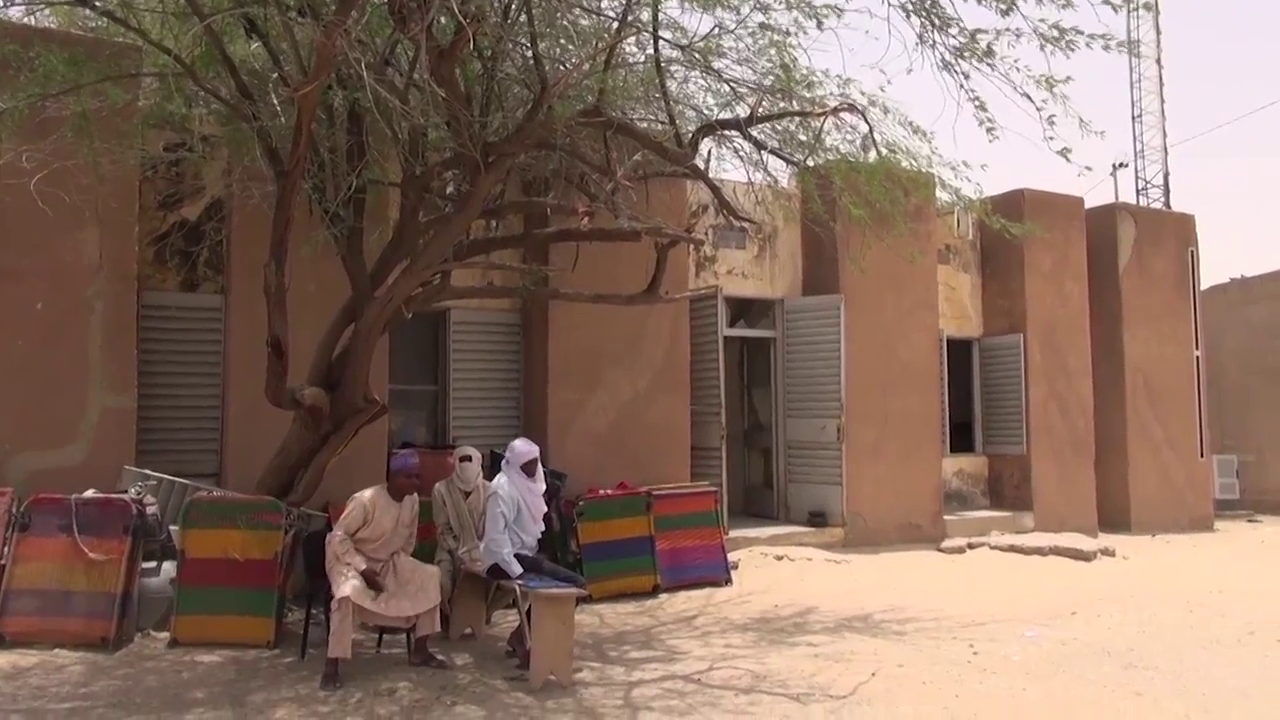
- Bosso

- Location in Niger
- Coordinates: 13.6969°N 13.3103°E
- Country: Niger
- Region: Diffa Region
- Department: Diffa Department
- Elevation: 909 ft (277 m)

Population (2012)
  - Total: 65.022
- Time zone: UTC+1 (WAT)

Bosso is a village and rural commune in the southeastern part of Niger. As of 2011, the commune had a total population of 52,177 people. It lies on the Nigerian border.

In June 2013, between 5,000 and 10,000 refugees arrived here, fleeing fighting between Boko Haram and the Nigerian Armed Forces in Borno State of Nigeria. Most blamed the military for the excessive violence and human rights violations.

== Climate ==
Köppen-Geiger climate classification system classifies its climate as hot desert (BWh).

Climate data for Bosso, Niger
Month	Jan	Feb	Mar	Apr	May	Jun	Jul	Aug	Sep	Oct	Nov	Dec	Year
Mean daily maximum °C (°F)	29.4 (84.9)	32.4 (90.3)	36.2 (97.2)	38.8 (101.8)	39.5 (103.1)	38.2 (100.8)	35 (95)	33.1 (91.6)	35.1 (95.2)	36.5 (97.7)	33.4 (92.1)	30.1 (86.2)	34.8 (94.7)
Daily mean °C (°F)	21 (70)	23.5 (74.3)	27.6 (81.7)	30.5 (86.9)	31.8 (89.2)	31.3 (88.3)	29.3 (84.7)	27.8 (82.0)	28.8 (83.8)	28.6 (83.5)	25 (77)	21.6 (70.9)	27.2 (81.0)
Mean daily minimum °C (°F)	12.7 (54.9)	14.7 (58.5)	19.1 (66.4)	22.3 (72.1)	24.2 (75.6)	24.4 (75.9)	23.7 (74.7)	22.6 (72.7)	22.6 (72.7)	20.8 (69.4)	16.6 (61.9)	13.1 (55.6)	19.7 (67.5)
Average precipitation mm (inches)	0 (0)	0 (0)	0 (0)	1 (0.0)	6 (0.2)	15 (0.6)	70 (2.8)	119 (4.7)	30 (1.2)	4 (0.2)	0 (0)	0 (0)	245 (9.7)
Source: Climate-Data.org (altitude: 287m)
