= Damasak =

- Town
- Location in Nigeria
- Coordinates: 13°6′18″N 12°30′24″E
- Country: Nigeria
- State: Borno State
- Local Government Area: Mobbar
- Control: Islamic State

Damasak is the head town of the Mobbar Local Government Area, in the northeastern Nigerian state of Borno. It is located near the confluence of the Yobe River and Komadugu Gana River, adjoining the border with Niger.

Two primary roads reach Damasak. One heads south to Gubio and Maiduguri, the capital of Borno State, and the other heads east towards Kukawa and Baga.

In recent years, advancing desertification in northern Nigeria has affected Damasak.

== History ==
According to legend, the town was founded by Kamkama Modu, a Karde from Bagirmi.

Damasak was a stronghold of the Sao civilisation in the 16th century and was surrounded by thick high trapezoidal walls. It was conquered by Idris Alooma after a siege in the 1570s or 1580s, as recorded by Ibn Furtu (who refers to the Sao as the "Sao-Gafata").

The current location of Damasak is probably not its original location. Historian Graham Connah visited the area in 1965 and a group of local men reported that the present site of Damasak is about 1 km west of its prior location (where mounds can be found), and which they reported was abandoned in the first half of the 1800s but had been occupied for approximately 100 years.

German explorer Heinrich Barth (1821-1865) reported in the 1850s that Damasak (spelled as Dammasak) could still be identified from a basin of the river named after it, but that it was currently called "Fatoghana". He also reports that Edris, the King of Bornu from 1353 to 1376, died at Damasak according to some accounts.

In March 2015, at least 70 dead bodies were found outside the town. They were discovered soon after the town had been retaken from Boko Haram. On 24 March 2015, residents said that Boko Haram had kidnapped more than 400 women and children from the town as they fled from coalition forces earlier in the month.
