= Abuja attack =

Abuja attack may refer to:

- Abuja bus crash riots
- Miss World riots
- October 2010 Abuja bombings
- December 2010 Abuja bombing
- May 2011 Nigeria bombings
- 2011 Abuja police headquarters bombing
- 2011 Abuja United Nations bombing
- Abuja DSS attack
- April 2014 Nyanya bombing
- May 2014 Nyanya bombing
- June 2014 Kaduna and Abuja attacks
  - Wuse bombing
