= Nigeria–United States relations =

- Nigeria: United States

Diplomatic mission
- Nigerian Embassy, Washington D.C.: Embassy of the United States, Abuja

Envoy
- Ambassador Uzoma Emenike: Ambassador; Vacant

Bilateral relations between the Federal Republic of Nigeria and the United States of America were formally inaugurated when Nigeria attained its independence from Britain in 1960. In the 21st century, they have entailed an important, if occasionally uneasy, alliance, following a more chequered diplomatic past. Nigeria has traditionally been among the United States's most important partners in Africa, and together the countries' populations account for more than half a billion people.

Although Nigeria entered its independence with a broadly, though informally, pro-Western and anti-Soviet orientation, its early relations with the United States were significantly strained by the U.S. government's official neutral stance during the Nigerian Civil War and its refusal to send weapons to the Nigerian military government led by Yakubu Gowon, the U.S. government authorizing sending humanitarian aid to Biafra during the Biafran airlift, and by Cold War dynamics elsewhere in Africa. Under the administration of American President Gerald Ford, tensions were piqued by the countries' support for opposing sides in the Angolan Civil War, and by the United States's ongoing cordiality with the apartheid government in South Africa, which remained a sticking point throughout the 1980s. Relations improved considerably in the mid-1970s, both because of the foreign policy initiatives of Jimmy Carter's administration and because of the increased importance of Nigerian oil for the United States in the aftermath of the 1973 oil crisis. Carter's visit to Lagos in 1978 was the first ever state visit of a U.S. president to Sub-Saharan Africa.

In the 1980s, ongoing trade and investment links were accompanied by simmering diplomatic tensions over the Nigerian government's failure to curb cross-border crime and drug trafficking, and over increased reports of human rights abuses inside Nigeria. Although the United States had rarely objected to Nigerian military rule in the past, its tolerance expired under the regime of General Sani Abacha, who took power during a 1993 military coup d'état. For the next five years, Nigeria faced escalating sanctions and the near dissolution of diplomatic relations. However, following the death of Abacha, the U.S. was quick to welcome Nigeria's return to democracy in 1999. Under Nigerian President Olusegun Obasanjo, trade and aid links intensified, and the relationship between the countries regained its erstwhile warmth. Bilateral relations are increasingly centred around military, security, and counterterrorism cooperation in West Africa, particularly multilateral initiatives in the Gulf of Guinea and on ISIS and Boko Haram. During the course of these initiatives, tensions and mistrust between the United States military and Nigerian military have sometimes spilled over into diplomatic discord.

Emerging from an earlier tradition of bilateral oil diplomacy, both countries have diversified their oil trades over the last decade, but the United States remains a major market for Nigerian exports, almost entirely in crude oil. The United States is also the primary foreign investor in Nigeria and a significant source of foreign aid. Over a million Nigerians and Nigerian Americans live, study, and work in the United States, while over 25,000 Americans live and work in Nigeria. There are many Nigerian Diaspora organizations in the United States that help the political and economic empowerment of the people of Nigerian descent outside of Nigeria. Complementing these formal economic links are a large volume of family remittances from the United States's large Nigerian American population. Yet Nigeria's oil resources and importance for regional stability have tended to counteract any strong dependence on the United States, reducing the latter's leverage and necessitating a relationship built on mutual respect and pragmatic mutual advantage.

== History ==
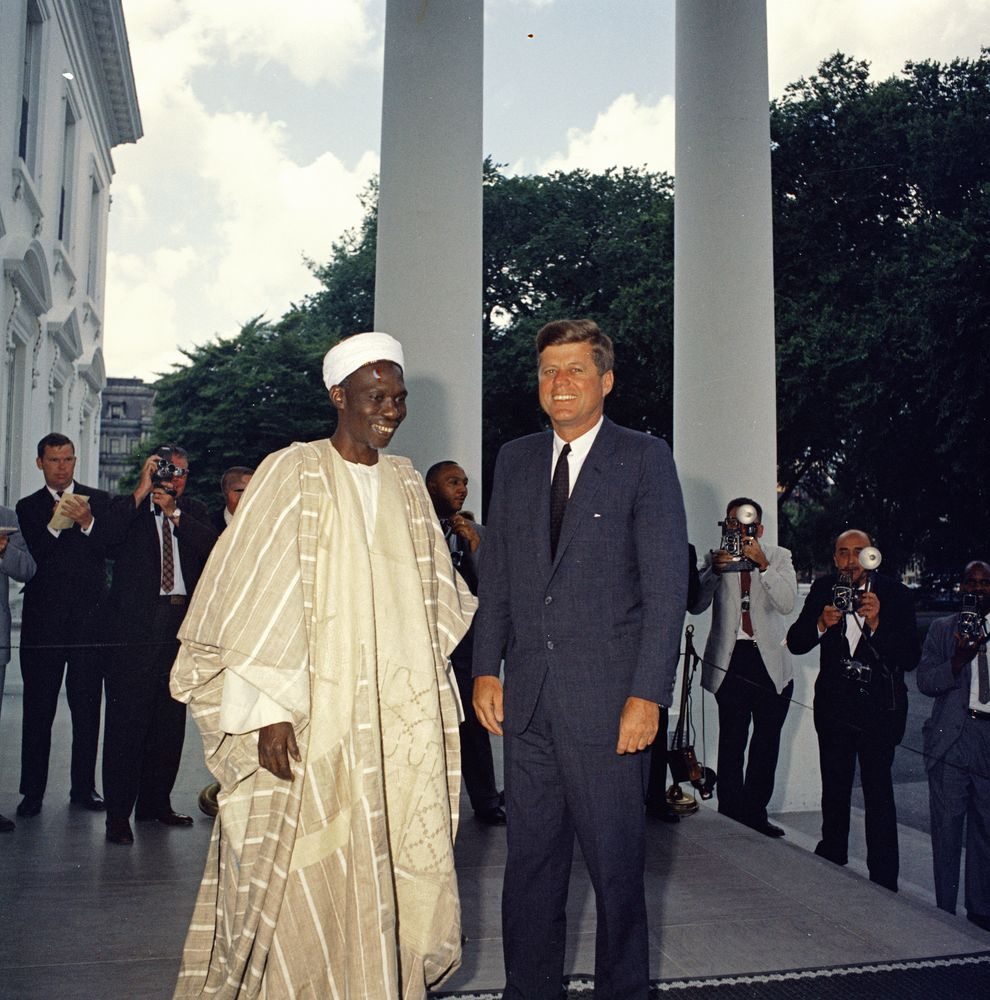
Nigeria's first and only Prime Minister, Sir Abubakar Tafawa Balewa, at the White House with U.S. President John F. Kennedy in 1961, shortly after Nigerian independence.

=== 1960–1966: Early diplomatic relations ===
Formal diplomatic relations were established with the opening of the American Embassy in Lagos and of the Nigerian Embassy in Washington, both on 1 October 1960, the same day which Nigeria acquired its independence from British rule. American president Dwight D. Eisenhower was represented at the independence ceremonies by Nelson Rockefeller, the Governor of New York. In his message to the new government on 2 October, Eisenhower promised Nigeria American support, but also warned about possible threats from outside its borders – understood as a veiled reference to the Soviet Union, and therefore a harbinger of the Cold War dynamics that were to shape Nigeria–U.S. relations in this early period. Upon Nigeria's admission to the United Nations (UN) later in 1960, Prime Minister Abubakar Tafawa Balewa announced that, as a matter of policy, Nigeria would remain neutral of the Cold War power blocs, and would not sacrifice its independence to East–West rivalries. However, although the civilian administration of the Nigerian First Republic was formally non-aligned, it was also "openly, though not slavishly, pro-West". This was partly a matter of diplomatic and economic orientation, as a result of Nigeria's continued closeness with Britain, but it also involved ideological affinities. As Balewa reflected in a 1961 speech to Nigerian parliamentarians, "We admire the American way of life, and we respect the people of the United States for their love of freedom".

Apart from containing the spread of Soviet communism, another of the U.S.'s early objectives in Nigeria was to strengthen bilateral economic ties. It had demonstrated its interest in Nigeria's economic development prior to 1960, providing development assistance through Britain and, by 1958, committing $700,000 to fund ten projects in Nigeria, mostly in agriculture. Shortly after Nigerian independence, a five-man special economic mission was sent to study Nigeria's development plan and inquire into possible areas of economic cooperation. At the mission's recommendation, the U.S. committed to provide $225 million in development assistance over five years, beginning in 1962 with $25 million in loans and grants.

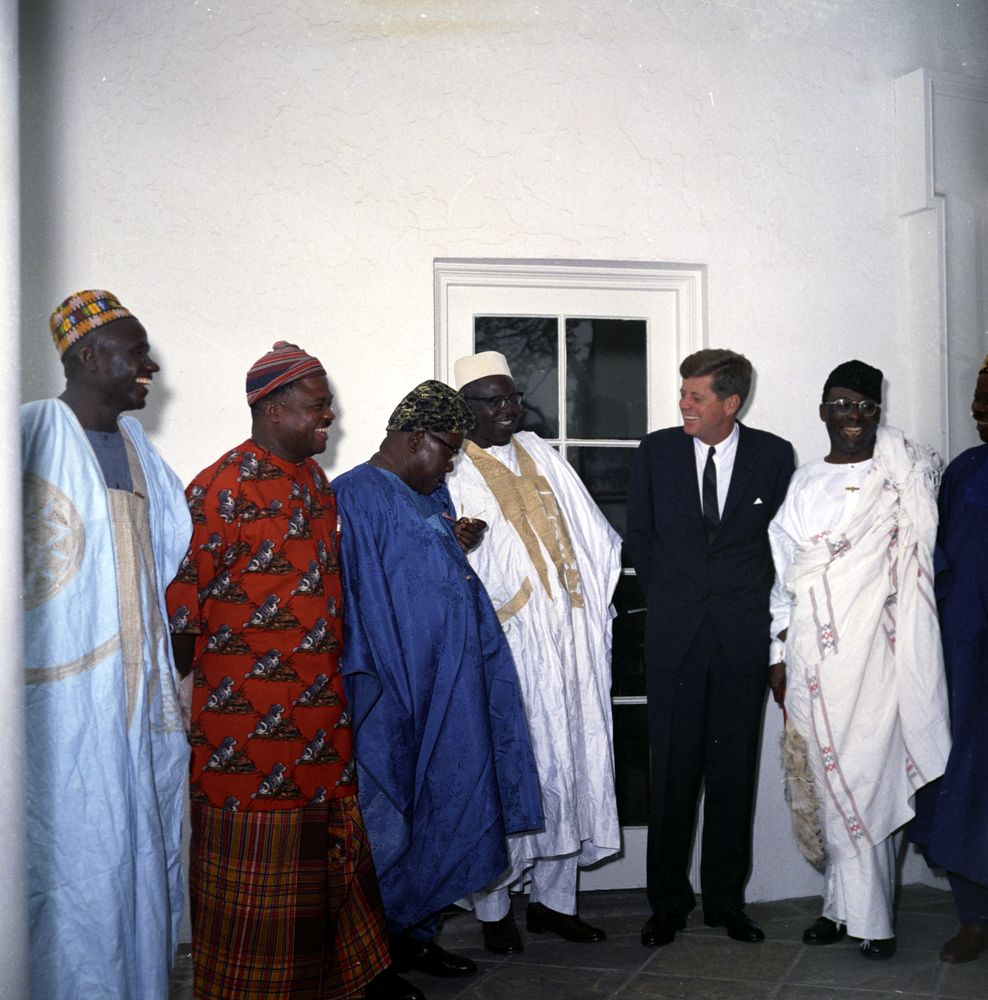
President Kennedy at the White House with a delegation of Nigerian parliamentarians, June 1962.

In 1964, a U.S. State Department policy document explained, "The primary interest of the U.S. in Nigeria is to see it grow and prosper, within the Free World, as a leader and good example for other African countries." However, this programme was disrupted in 1966, when a military coup and counter-coup in Nigeria overturned its relative political stability. In the chaos of the aftermath, the U.S. Peace Corps was expelled en masse from Nigeria.

=== 1967–1970: Nigerian Civil War ===
In July 1967, civil war broke out in Nigeria, fuelled by the attempted secession of Biafra. The U.S. quickly assumed "a dubious neutral posture", though both the Biafran secessionists and General Yakubu Gowon's federal military government sought U.S. military and diplomatic support. Four days after the outbreak of hostilities, the U.S. announced that it would not sell or supply arms to either side, "in order not to deepen the conflict". Traditionally deferent to the role of the former colonial powers in Africa, and thoroughly entangled in Vietnam, President Lyndon B. Johnson considered the war a "British affair" from which American interests were largely insulated. Although this policy enraged Nigerian officials, the Nigerian federal government made a conciliatory statement, reaffirming its non-aligned stance in the Cold War and expressing that the U.S. and Britain "still remain[ed] Nigeria's first choice for the purchases of arms for many reasons" – though also warning that it expected "its friends, particularly in the West" not to obstruct its war effort. Without American support, the federal government requested, and received, Soviet military assistance. However, the U.S. did not view this alliance as particularly threatening to its own interests – partly because Soviet participation was neutralised by Britain's participation, and partly because Nigerian elites had demonstrated a resilient conservatism: in Oye Ogunbadejo's summation, "General Gowon was hardly a Bolshevik". This estimation proved correct: even at the height of Soviet assistance, and although Nigeria continued to maintain aid and trade links with the Soviet Union after the end of the war, Nigerian leaders were never greatly enraptured by Soviet ideology.

When U.S. President Richard Nixon entered office in 1969, he supported direct intervention in Nigeria to support the Biafran cause. This support waned, however – possibly because Henry Kissinger and other State Department officials vociferously supported the federal government, and possibly, as in Kissinger's recollection, because British Prime Minister Harold Wilson swayed Nixon's views. Nevertheless, even without a direct intervention, the U.S. failed in its attempts to maintain a "low profile". At the exhortation of a powerful pro-Biafran lobby in Washington, the U.S. provided significant relief, estimated at more than $9 million, to address the humanitarian crisis that had arisen from the prolonged blockade of Biafra. Simultaneously, in an attempt to appease the federal government, it declared its political support for the federalists and for the "One Nigeria" concept: Joseph Palmer II, the Assistant Secretary of State for African Affairs and formerly the first U.S. ambassador to Nigeria, said in a statement that the U.S. hoped to see a "united and indivisible" Nigeria. However, the federal military government was offended by U.S. support for Biafra, which had been unavoidably political in its indirect recognition of the Biafran government's authority. It also resented the U.S. for permitting – and even, some Nigerian officials suspected, conniving – the pro-Biafran propaganda campaign in the West. The Secretary of State acknowledged in a 1971 report that the arms embargo and Biafran relief efforts had "seriously strained" Nigeria–U.S. relations.

=== 1970–1977: Disagreement over Southern Africa ===
When Biafra collapsed in January 1970, Nixon was among the first world leaders to congratulate the federal military government on its victory. His Secretary of State, William Rogers, visited Nigeria on 19 to 20 February, and delivered a personal letter from Nixon expressing admiration of Gowon's leadership. However, when Gowon visited the U.S. for five days in 1973, he did not meet with Nixon. More generally, U.S.–Nigeria relations remained "decidedly cool" for most of the 1970s, and included a period of "estrangement" under the administration of U.S. President Gerald Ford (1974–1977). This was due not only to the resentment left over from the Nigerian Civil War, but also to increasingly vigorous disagreements between the countries about the proper approach to conflicts in Southern African countries under white minority rule.

Although the U.S. did not perceive Nigeria itself as vulnerable to the spread of communism, its containment policy elsewhere in Africa led to tensions in the 1970s, especially as the Soviet and Cuban presence increased in Southern Africa, the new frontier of African decolonisation. Nigeria's opposition to apartheid and white minority rule was "consistent, fervent and active". There were several strong reasons for this: Nigeria's resistance to South African hegemony and the South African strategy of seeking to establish clientele administrations in the so-called frontline states; its genuine ideological commitment to the total liberation of Africa from colonisation and white majority rule; and its belief that African liberation should be achieved with deference to the sovereignty of African states, implying emphasis on the Organisation for African Unity (OAU) framework and on the states' autonomy to invite assistance from any allies of the liberation movement, including the Soviet Union and Cuba. Nigeria's support for the Angolans in the Angolan War of Independence, and then for the Movimento Popular da Libertação de Angola (MPLA) in the Angolan Civil War, invoked this same mixture of motivations.

Nigeria's general position on Southern Africa and Angola had always been clear but, under General Murtala Muhammed – who came to power in a 1975 coup – Nigeria launched a diplomatic offensive in support of MPLA, leading to the recognition of the latter's government by most member states of the OAU. Additionally, Nigeria provided aid to liberation movements, both through the OAU and as direct bilateral military and economic aid, valued at an estimated $5 million annually in the mid-1970s. This aid included weapons supplies and the use of Nigerian military aircraft, and by 1977 the government had announced its willingness to send Nigerian troops to support the liberation of Southern Africa, even at the risk of incurring nuclear retaliation from South Africa. In Angola – as in other cases in the 20th century – this posture put Nigeria at odds with the U.S., due to the latter's containment policy, closeness with the former colonial powers, and links with the apartheid government in South Africa. In January 1976, Ford wrote a letter to Muhammed in which he promised to encourage South Africa to end its intervention in the Angolan Civil War, but only if Muhammad told MPLA to request the departure of Soviet and Cuban troops. "We cannot... stand idly by if the Soviet and Cuban intervention persists," Ford concluded. He reportedly wrote similar letters to other African heads of state, pressuring them not to support or recognise MPLA and suggesting that the independence of South West Africa (South African-ruled Namibia) would be conditional on the withdrawal of Cuba from Angola. Muhammed responded with vitriol, in an official statement describing the letter as "an insult to the African leaders". The Nigerian press and public were similarly outraged: the Daily Times ran the story under the headline "Shut Up", while the front page of the Nigerian Herald announced, "To Hell With America".

Public opinion in Nigeria had already turned against the U.S. by then, especially due to its imports of chromite from white-ruled Rhodesia under the Byrd Amendment, which sidestepped the sanctions imposed on Rhodesia. And in February 1975, for example, the Nigerian army – equipped with tanks – had forcibly removed the U.S. Agency for International Development from its Lagos Island offices. However, the month after Ford's letter, in February 1976, tensions were further heightened when Muhammed was assassinated in an attempted coup in which the Nigerian government suspected the involvement of the U.S. Central Intelligence Agency. Anti-American demonstrations by students followed in Lagos and elsewhere in Nigeria: protestors burned American flags, attacked U.S. diplomatic outposts, and demanded the nationalization of U.S. Gulf Oil. This led to "a virtual breakdown of diplomatic relations" between the two countries. On two occasions in 1976, the federal military government refused Secretary of State Kissinger permission to visit Lagos, and the New York Times reported suspicions that it had similarly pressured Ghana to cancel Kissinger's planned visit to Accra. In October 1976, Nigeria rejected the Anglo–American proposal for a Rhodesian settlement, and, in March 1977, the New York Times correspondent for West Africa, John Darnton, was arrested in Lagos and then expelled from Nigeria, amid continued official and public paranoia about American spies.

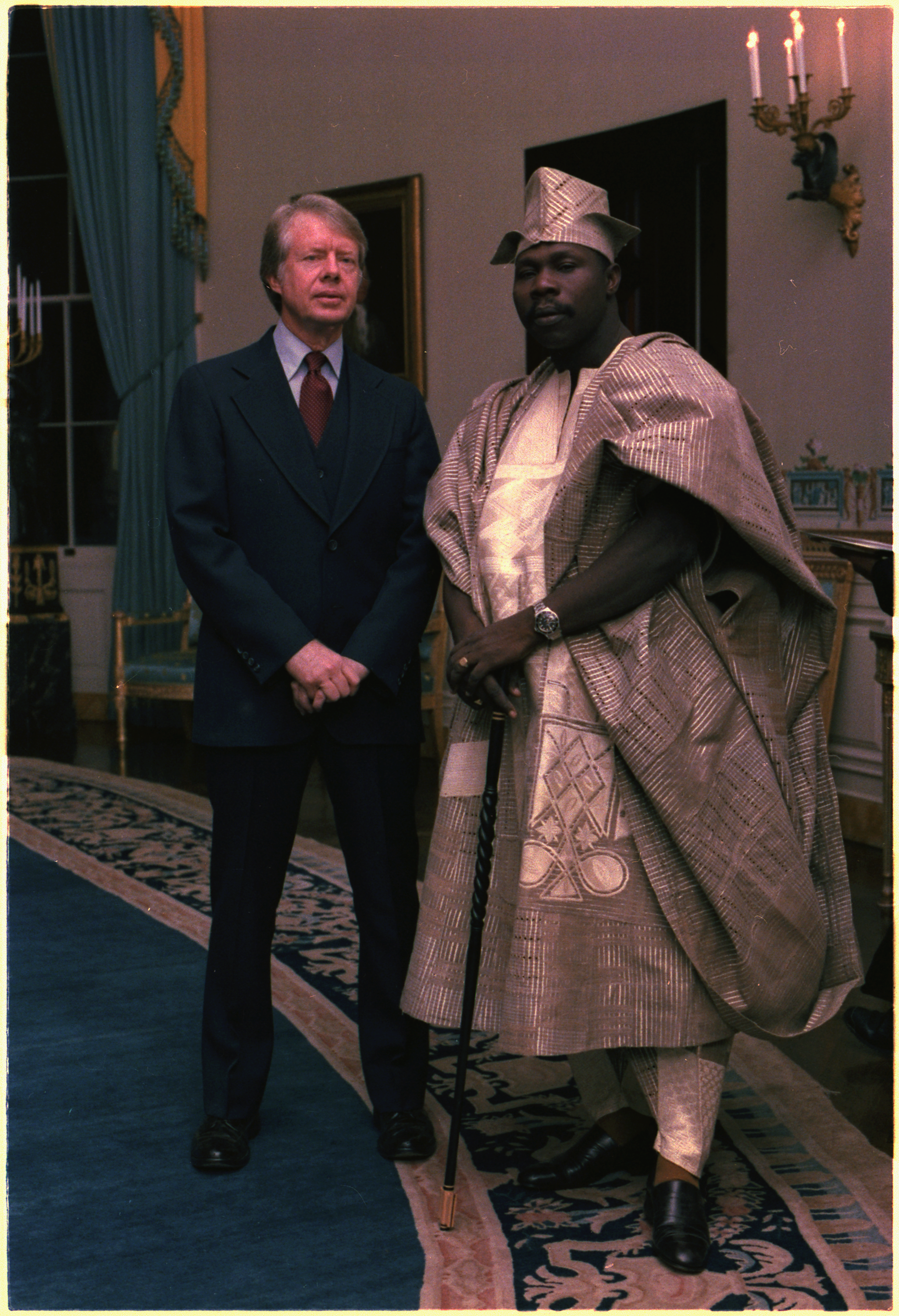
U.S. President Jimmy Carter with Nigerian head of state Lieutenant General Olusegun Obasanjo in the White House, October 1977.

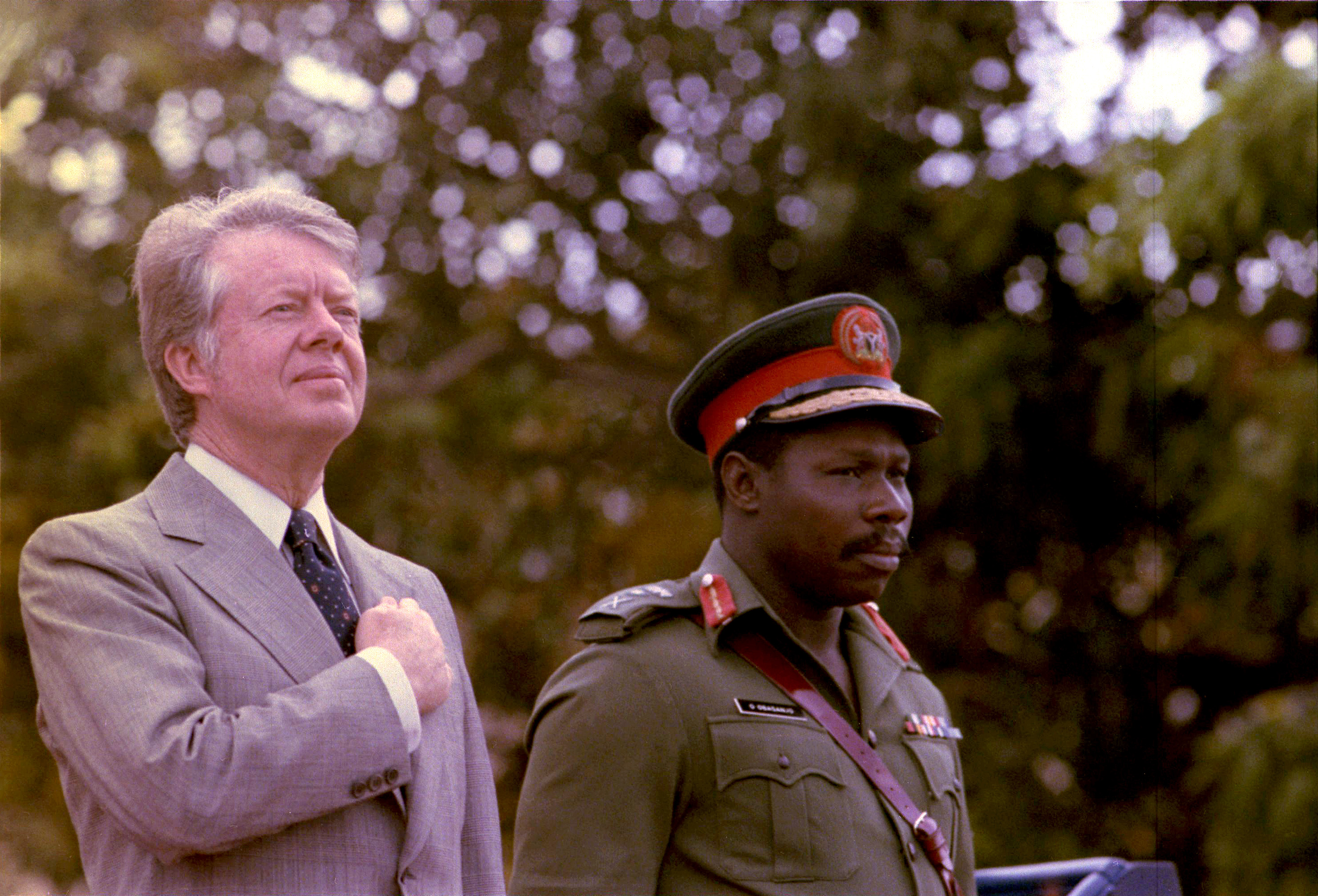
President Carter and General Obasanjo in Lagos, April 1978. "I come from a great nation to visit a great nation," Carter told his Nigerian audience.

=== 1977–1981: Rapprochement under Carter ===
Nigeria–U.S. relations improved considerably from 1977, largely because of the election of Jimmy Carter as U.S. president. Carter's foreign policy on Africa has been characterised as differing significantly from that of his predecessors – not only in its emphasis on Africa, but also in its resistance to the Cold War realpolitik of the Kissinger era, which, in the words of Cyrus Vance, Carter's Secretary of State, treated Africa "as a testing ground of East–West competition". Instead, Carter sought to project the U.S.'s liberal image abroad, emphasising principles of global justice and human rights; he also publicly denounced apartheid, and criticised the Ford administration's strategy in the Angolan Civil War. Additionally, Carter appointed as U.S. ambassador to the United Nations a young black Congressman, Andrew Young, who had pre-existing personal friendships with both Lieutenant General Olusegun Obasanjo, the Nigerian head of state, and Brigadier Joe Garba, the Nigerian Commissioner for External Affairs. More generally, the U.S., and its ambassador to Nigeria, Donald B. Easum, emphasised the U.S.'s intention to consult Nigeria closely on its foreign policy elsewhere in Africa. The effect of both changes was "an opportunity for a fresh start" in Nigeria–U.S. relations. Moreover, circumstances might have led Nigerian leaders to reconsider their hardline foreign policy stance: both the deterioration of the Nigerian economy, and the poor progress of Southern African liberation movements, made diplomatic rapprochement with the U.S. an appealing and even necessary course. Carter's determination to curb dependence on foreign oil imports, combined with a damaging fall in Nigerian oil earnings due to a global supply glut, also made it important to shore up Nigeria's economic ties to the U.S. (And, indeed, in 1977, more than 80% of Nigerian oil exports went to the U.S.)

Bilateral diplomatic relations rapidly improved, and the heads of state exchanged official visits. Obasanjo visited Washington in October 1977, and Carter visited Lagos in March to April 1978. Obasanjo's state visit was the first of a Nigerian leader to the U.S. since independence, while Carter's was the first ever state visit of a U.S. leader to a Sub-Saharan African country. The product of these visits was the Nigerian–U.S. Manpower Training Agreement, under which thousands of Nigerians would receive technical training in the U.S.; and agreements to set up four joint working groups, on investment and trade, technology, agriculture, and rural development and education. Over the next two years, official trade delegations travelled frequently between the countries for high-level consultations. Also in 1977, the Nigerian government signed two large contracts with American firms for the planning of its new capital in Abuja, a notable departure from the tradition of Nigerian–British cooperation on such matters. Military assistance also increased: whereas U.S. sales of military equipment to Nigeria had amounted to only about $12.6 million between 1950 and 1976, in 1977 the U.S. approved $45.5 million in such sales. Finally, Carter and Obasanjo quickly reached a partial resolution of their countries' disagreements over Southern Africa. In September 1977, Obasanjo publicly and strongly endorsed the new Anglo–American proposals for a settlement in Rhodesia, and lobbied for them in a meeting in Lusaka with the heads of the frontline states. This followed meetings with Young and the U.S. government about the details of the proposal, and, thereafter, Nigeria was closely consulted on developments – after negotiations collapsed in January 1978, U.S. and other Western representatives flew to Lagos for consultation with the Nigerian government.

When Nigeria returned to a democratic system under the Second Republic, diplomatic relations remained amicable. Indeed, Nigeria's democratic constitution of 1979 was loosely modelled on the U.S. federal presidential system, and sixteen Members of the Nigerian National Assembly visited the U.S. Congress to study how the system operated under the demographic complexities of ethnicity and religion which the U.S. and Nigeria had in common. Vice President Walter Mondale visited Nigeria in July 1980 as part of an African tour, and he emphasised the U.S.'s desire to strengthen its economic links with Nigeria. Nigerian President Shehu Shagari visited the U.S. in October 1980.

However, domestic Nigerian opinion on closer Nigeria–U.S. cooperation was mixed. Some domestic constituencies, including parts of the press, resented the development and opposed the government's support for the Anglo-American plan in Rhodesia. At the official level, Southern Africa remained a sticking point. The Carter administration's application of its Africa policy sometimes appeared "erratic" to Nigerian officials, fermenting doubt about the sincerity of the U.S.'s commitments to justice and independence in Southern Africa. Its relative serenity about communist expansion did not eliminate the U.S. propensity – in the eyes of the Nigerians – for "overreaction". During Carter's Lagos visit, Obasanjo "politely declined" Carter's invitation to issue a joint condemnation of Soviet and Cuban involvement in Africa. Nigeria was not supportive of the U.S.'s involvement in Shaba II or, later, in the Horn of Africa, and its relationship with South Africa was particularly unpopular. In October 1977, for example, though the U.S. supported a six-month arms embargo on South Africa at the UN Security Council, it also joined Britain and France in vetoing the Afro-Asian draft resolution which called for mandatory economic and military sanctions. During Carter's visit to Lagos in April 1978, Obasanjo was openly critical of the U.S. and the West for their lukewarm stance on apartheid and their continued collaboration with Pretoria on military and economic matters. Such tensions worsened under Carter's successor, Ronald Reagan, whose government undertook "constructive engagement" with Pretoria and vetoed Security Council resolutions on sanctions. A consistent supporter of sanctions against South Africa, Nigeria welcomed the U.S. Congress's defiance of Reagan's veto in passing the 1986 Comprehensive Anti-Apartheid Act.

=== 1981–1993: Uneasy entente ===
In the 1980s, as the domestic economy deteriorated, Nigeria became a hub for cross-border drug trafficking and financial fraud, especially so-called 419 scams. Though not a major narcotics producer, it was a major shipment point on the international narcotics circuit, particularly for opiates and cocaine transported to North America and Europe – by the mid-1990s, U.S. drug enforcement authorities estimated that Nigerian networks transported more than half of all heroin available in the U.S. This provided both an impetus for closer bilateral cooperation and a source of tensions. In 1987, the countries signed a mutual law enforcement agreement, followed by a special memorandum of understanding on narcotics control. Nigerian law enforcement also received U.S. counternarcotics training. However, the U.S. also grew increasing frustrated with what it perceived as the Nigerian government's "permissive attitude towards corruption and lawlessness".

In 1985, Nigeria's General Ibrahim Babangida assumed power in a coup and promised better bilateral relations, pointing to his own military training in the U.S. In fact, under Babangida's administration, there was growing concern in the U.S. about human rights abuses perpetrated by the military government. In December 1989, the U.S. government wrote off $80.5 million in Nigerian debt, although Babangida's planned visit to the U.S. the next month was cancelled.

=== 1993–1998: Isolation of the Abacha regime ===
==== Diplomatic response ====
From the late 1980s, as Nigeria planned for its return to civilian rule under the anticipated Third Republic, the U.S. supported these efforts, both financially – by supporting World Bank loans – and diplomatically. The U.S. was a natural partner for Nigeria in planning this transition, both because Nigeria's last democratic constitution had been modelled on its own, and because U.S. President Bill Clinton entered office in 1993 intending to undertake a policy of active engagement in Africa, and one which, in the post-Cold War international environment, would promote good governance and democracy. In June 1993, however, democratic elections were held in Nigeria and then promptly annulled by General Babangida. The U.S. State Department criticised the annulment as "outrageous", and additionally expressed concern about "the continuing repression of the press and democratic forces" amid the political instability that followed. While warning that it would take further steps if the military did not hand over to civilian rule, the U.S. implemented several preliminary measures to "register its concern and displeasure", including the cancellation of $11 million in budgetary assistance to the Nigerian Ministry of Health; the termination of all other development assistance, except humanitarian aid channelled through non-governmental organizations; and the termination of all bilateral military assistance and training, except for counter-narcotics-related training. The U.S. security assistance officer was withdrawn from Nigeria, while the U.S. defence attaché suspended his travel to Nigeria, and the Nigerian military attaché was requested to leave Washington. Finally, the government instituted case-by-case review, "with a presumption of denial", for all new license applications for commercial defence exports to Nigeria.

The presumptive winner of the June election, Moshood Abiola, meanwhile travelled to the U.S. and to Britain to obtain foreign support for his presidency. In November 1993, however, General Sani Abacha was installed as head of state in a bloodless coup. The following month, President Clinton issued a proclamation under the Immigration and Nationality Act, restricting entry into the U.S. for "Nigerians who formulate, implement, or benefit from policies which hinder Nigeria’s transition to democracy" and for those individuals' immediate families. In early 1994, Nigeria was additionally de-certified under the U.S. Foreign Assistance Act for failing to control drug trafficking inside its borders, with severe implications for the foreign assistance that it could receive. Further sanctions were implemented in subsequent months and years, especially in response to reports of escalating political repression and human rights abuses inside Nigeria. The U.S. government denounced the death penalty handed down to former head of state Obasanjo, and to others, for allegedly plotting a coup attempt. It issued what diplomat George E. Moose called "a strongly worded statement" urging clemency, and Clinton reportedly telephoned Abacha personally to warn him against carrying out the executions. Following the summary execution of Ken Saro-Wiwa and the rest of the Ogoni Nine in November 1995, sanctions and travel restrictions were strengthened, including restrictions on the movements of Nigerian diplomats and officials visiting the U.S. The U.S. also recalled its ambassador to Nigeria. Bipartisan bills authorising further sanctions were introduced in both the Senate and the House of Representatives, but did not receive a vote.

By early 1996, Nigeria's relations with the West were at "an all-time low". This was despite the efforts of Donald McHenry, a diplomat widely respected in Nigeria, who had been appointed Clinton's special envoy in 1994 and who had made repeated visits to Nigeria to engage with Abacha through backchannels. The incumbent U.S. ambassador to Nigeria, Walter Carrington, was a vocal critic of Abacha's regime, and became "virtually persona non grata" in Nigeria. However, despite its continuous application of "a tenuous mixture of quiet diplomacy and limited sanctions", commentators have observed that the U.S. appeared reluctant to sever or jeopardise irreparably its relations with Nigeria, particularly relations of economic and security cooperation. Although a freeze on Nigerian government assets had been considered, the proposal was thwarted when Nigeria threatened to reciprocate by suspending or forfeiting American assets in Nigeria. Perhaps most importantly, U.S. sanctions did not extend to the Nigerian oil sector. On one view, this was because the U.S. had calculated that there was insufficient political support – particularly in Europe – for a multilateral oil embargo, and that a unilateral embargo would be ineffectual. On another view, the U.S. maintained the oil trade to protect its national and commercial interests. American oil companies and others with large investments in Nigeria reportedly opposed harsher sanctions, especially the prospect of an oil embargo.

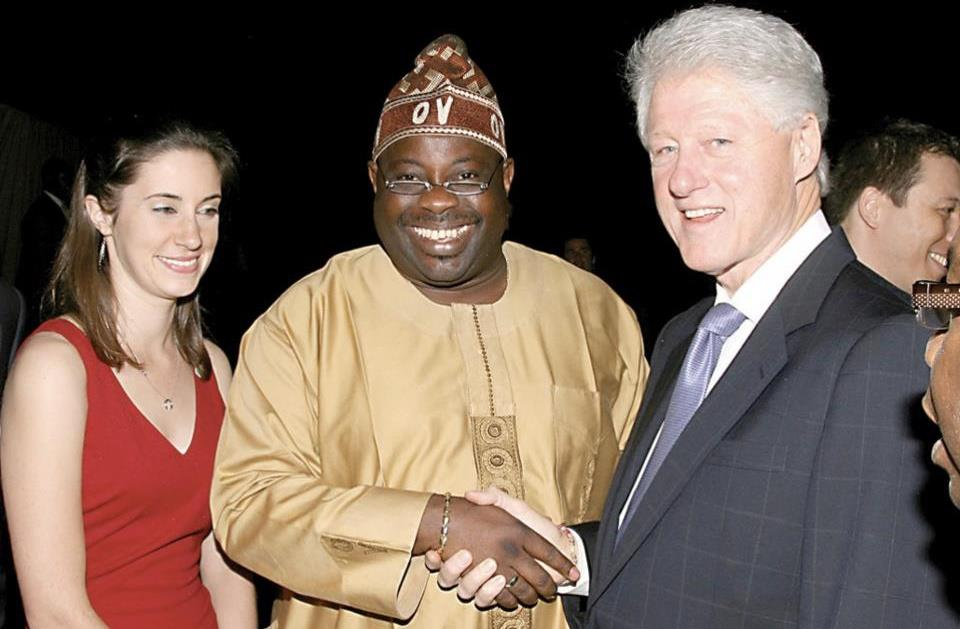
Former U.S. President Bill Clinton in 2008 with Dele Momodu, an activist who campaigned for Nigerian democratisation during Clinton's administration.

==== Public response ====
Public support for Abacha's international isolation emanated from a "small but vocal" collection of activists, who, between 1993 and 1999, led a sustained and high-profile campaign for Nigerian democratisation, both from inside Nigeria and from exile. The National Democratic Coalition (Nadeco), a Nigerian opposition group, was particularly active in the U.S., where several of its leaders were in exile. The U.S. received such groups with "succor and welcome". In July 1997, the Nigerian police announced their intention to question U.S. diplomats in relation to a series of bombings inside Nigeria in which Nadeco had been implicated. Other active groups included Amnesty International, Human Rights Watch, TransAfrica, a subset of the Congressional Black Caucus, and various other Nigerian-American organisations, who undertook forms of "confrontation politics", including having celebrities endorse their cause and demonstrating outside the Nigerian Embassy. In 1997, activists successfully lobbied the New York City Council to name a Second Avenue street corner, outside the Nigerian consulate, after Kudirat Abiola, a pro-democracy activist whose assassination was attributed to Abacha's regime. (Two weeks later, Abacha retaliated by renaming the street of the American consulate in Lagos after Louis Farrakhan, a virulent critic of the U.S. government.) Moreover, American politicians who supported Abacha, like Senator Carol Moseley Braun, risked harsh public censure.

=== 1998–2000s: Support for Nigerian democratization ===
After Abacha's abrupt death in June 1998, Nigeria–U.S. relations normalised quickly. Abacha's successor, General Abdulsalami Abubakar, relaxed domestic political restrictions and elaborated his commitment to democratisation. The U.S. opened diplomatic engagements with Abubakar and the military government, and also consulted with presidential hopeful Abiola, though the latter collapsed and died during a meeting with State Department officials. It also lifted the restrictions on Nigerian travel, aid, trade, and military cooperation. Shortly after Nigeria held democratic elections in February 1999, Clinton's Press Secretary announced that Nigeria would be re-certified under the Foreign Assistance Act. This was not because Nigeria had made strides in drug control, but because of the U.S.'s "vital national interests", given that, "Nigeria’s importance to regional stability, and potential as an example of political and economic reform in Africa, lends a unique significance to the transition now underway". Later in 1999, the U.S. relaxed an order which, since it was instituted in 1993, had banned all flights between the U.S. and Lagos's Murtala Muhammed International Airport because of lax security standards at the latter.

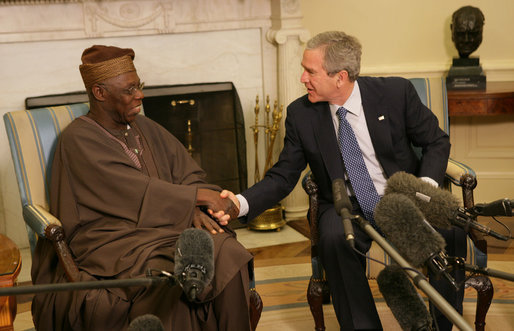
Nigerian President Obasanjo with U.S. President George W. Bush in the Oval Office, March 2006.

When Obasanjo took office in May that year, his inauguration was attended by a U.S. delegation. President Clinton visited Nigeria shortly afterwards – the first visit by an American president since Carter's in 1979, when, coincidentally, Obasanjo had also been the head of the state, though then not democratically elected. A personal relationship between Obasanjo and Clinton led to warmer bilateral relations, and the trend continued under Clinton's successor, George W. Bush, from 2001 – Obasanjo was the first African leader received by Bush at the White House, and he made further visits thereafter. Indeed, Obasanjo visited the U.S. nine times between 1999 and 2006. A key issue in bilateral relations during Bush and Obasanjo's first terms was Nigeria's desire for a so-called "democracy dividend", in the form of aid and debt cancellation or reduction. In 2001, asked by the Los Angeles Times how the U.S. could support Nigerian democratisation, Obasanjo observed:

"We adopted democracy not just for the intrinsic value of democracy, but because our people believe that democracy can enhance their quality of life... They expect, rightly, a democracy dividend. If that doesn't come, they will feel disenchanted. The United States can help us with that."

Obasanjo consistently lobbied for debt cancellation in meetings with the U.S. government, and the matter at times became "contentious". Clinton had not been "receptive" of this proposal, and the U.S. under Bush remained determined not to grant debt relief without a credible Nigerian commitment to macroeconomic reforms. During Obasanjo's second term, from 2003, he accelerated domestic policy reform and anti-corruption efforts, and thereby secured the agreement of the Paris Club to the cancellation of a significant amount of debt. However, observers have noted that the American democracy dividend to Nigeria was otherwise "sparse and uneven" in the first few years after the 1999 elections. U.S. foreign assistance to Nigeria surged between 1998 and 2001, from less than $7 million to $109 million, but it dwindled again in subsequent years, and in 2004 was estimated at $65 million. Aid packages were also increasingly dominated by humanitarian relief, with only token allocations to political and economic reforms, including governance, agriculture, and democracy.

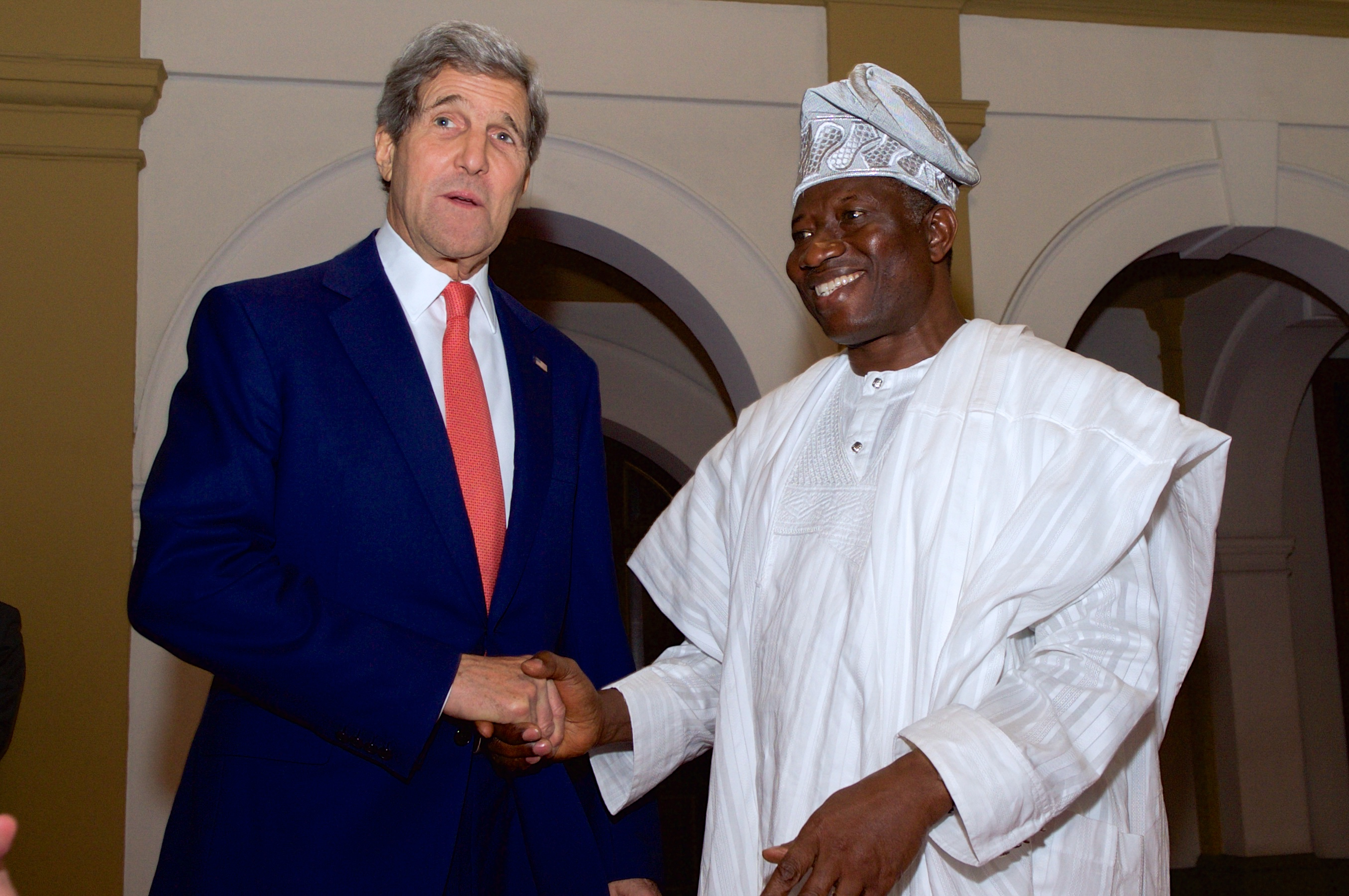
U.S. Secretary of State John Kerry with Nigerian President Goodluck Jonathan in Lagos, January 2015. Kerry met with Jonathan to obtain his commitment to a peaceful election.

Furthermore, closer Nigerian–U.S. ties met a mixed reception inside Nigeria. As they had during the Carter administration, critics questioned the sincerity of the U.S.'s support for human rights and democracy in Africa, suspecting that it was a cover for more cynical national interests and arguing that Nigeria had become a Western client state, no longer distinguished by its pursuit of an African-led and anti-imperialist foreign policy. Nonetheless, in later years, the U.S. remained willing to commit symbolic and political support to the maintenance of democratic civilian rule in Nigeria. Since the election of Muhammadu Buhari as Nigerian president in 2015, this has included high-level support for Buhari's domestic anti-corruption efforts – corruption was one item on the agenda at Buhari's meeting at the White House with U.S. President Barack Obama in July 2015. Buhari has lobbied the U.S. government to repatriate the proceeds of corruption by Nigerian public officials, and in April 2016 Ibrahim Magu, the chairman of the Economic and Financial Crimes Commission, visited Washington to lodge a request with the U.S. government for further technical assistance, training, and intelligence sharing.

There can't be any solutions to the problem of Africa unless there is direct involvement of the Nigerian government.

— U.S. Ambassador
Andrew Young

=== 1998–present: Closer ties ===
==== Security cooperation ====
President Clinton and his National Security Advisor, Anthony Lake, were particularly focused on conflict resolution in Africa, and were aware of Nigeria's important regional security influence. Nigeria had long been the central player in African peacekeeping missions, and it had taken a leadership role in – as well as provided most of the forces for – the ECOMOG missions which were decisive in Liberia and in Sierra Leone in the 1990s. After Obasanjo was elected, the U.S. made a concerted effort to equip Nigeria to continue playing this role: the U.S. Department of Defense initiated a training programme in peacekeeping operations for five Nigerian battalions, and in 2000 the U.S. provided Nigeria with over $10 million in military assistance and over $30 million in arms sales. One key element of Nigeria–U.S. military cooperation has been in addressing insurgency and crime in the Gulf of Guinea. This has important implications for American oil interests: in 2003, for example, conflict in the Niger Delta forced American oil company Chevron to suspend most of its on-land production in Nigeria.

Another key element has been counter-terrorism efforts. After the September 11, 2001 terrorist attacks, the U.S. increased its anti-terrorism efforts and its military presence in Africa, inaugurating closer security cooperation with Nigeria. According to some reports, Nigeria's support for the U.S. global war on terror – especially after the U.S. invaded Afghanistan – was unpopular with parts of its domestic population, a large proportion of which is Muslim; and violent religious clashes broke out at protests held in Nigeria against U.S. strikes in Afghanistan. Some resistance also emanated from inside the Nigerian military, whose senior officers reportedly preferred to work closely with Britain. Victor Malu claimed that Obasanjo had fired him as Chief of Army Staff because of his vocal and strident opposition to military cooperation with the U.S.

U.S. president Barack Obama and Nigerian president Muhammadu Buhari update the press following a bilateral meeting in Washington in September 2016.

==== Leahy Law restrictions ====
Since the early 2010s, counter-terrorism cooperation has focused on cooperation against the Nigerian-grown Boko Haram insurgency in West Africa, especially in the aftermath of the 2014 Chibok schoolgirls kidnapping. Under U.S. President Obama, this cooperation was limited by allegations of human rights abuses by the Nigerian military, including against civilians, which triggered the Leahy Law and therefore limited U.S. arms sales to Nigeria. This caused tensions with Nigeria. The Nigerian government and ambassador to the U.S. openly criticised the U.S.'s decision, in mid-2014, to block the sale of American-made Cobra attack helicopters to Nigeria from Israel due to concerns about human rights abuses – the Nigerian ambassador accused Washington of obstructing counterterrorist efforts. In turn, U.S. officials openly criticised the integrity and capacity of the Nigerian military during House and Senate hearings, and U.S. diplomat Johnnie Carson acknowledged in late 2014 that, "Tensions in the U.S.–Nigeria relationship are probably at their highest level in the past decade. There is a high degree of frustration on both sides." By August 2015, it was reported that the U.S. was moving towards removing Nigeria's restrictions under the Leahy Law.

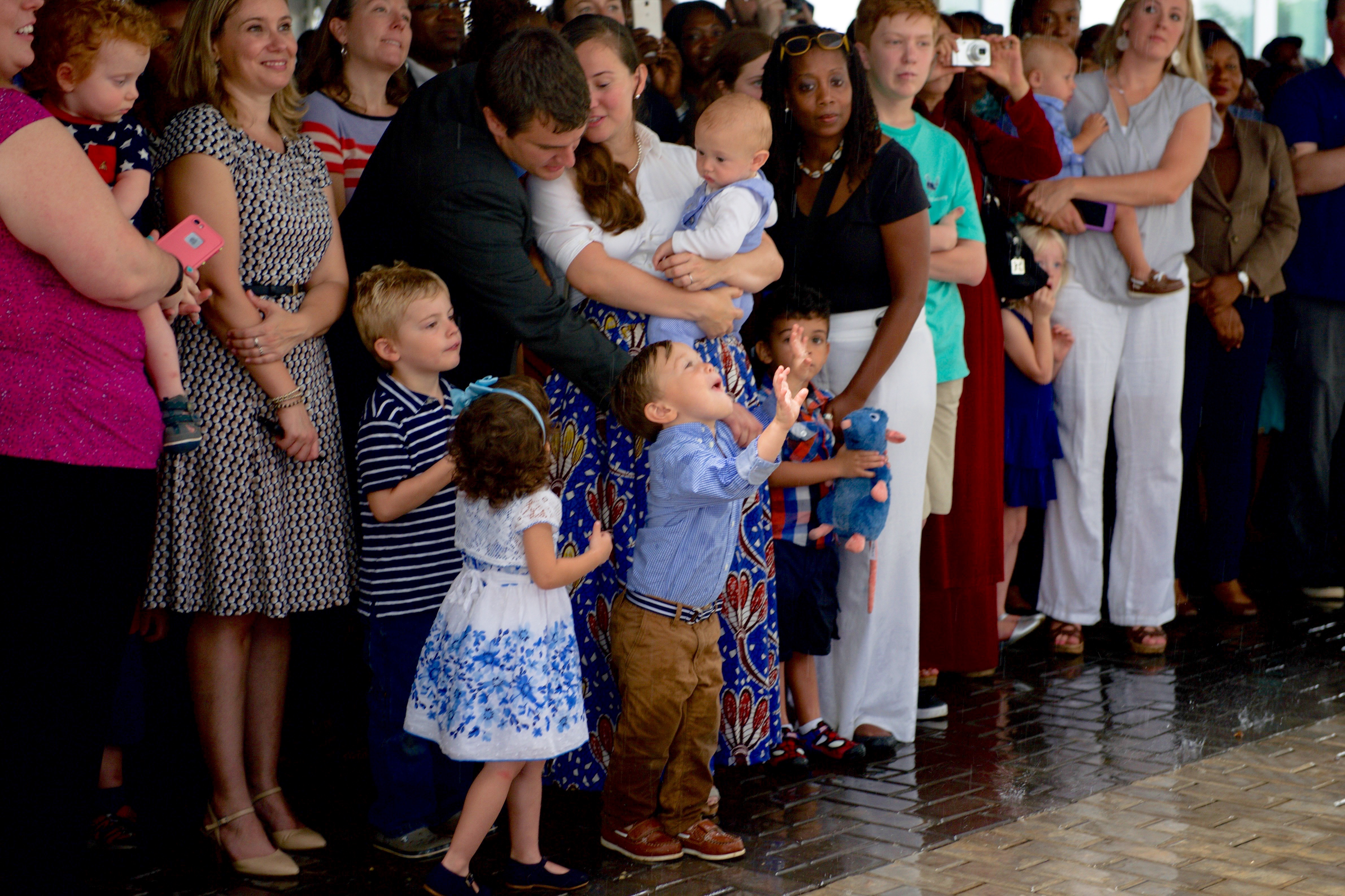
People at the U.S. Embassy in Abuja, Nigeria.

==== Travel ban and religious freedom watch list ====
On December 18, 2019, the U.S. Department of State added Nigeria to its Special Watch List of governments that have engaged in or tolerated "severe violations of religious freedom". It was removed from the list in November 2021, days before Secretary of State Antony Blinken arrived in Nigeria as part of his tour of Africa. Nigeria's removal was contrary to the recommendation of the U.S. Commission on International Religious Freedom, which said it was "appalled" by the decision.

In January 2020, only weeks after the Special Watch List announcement, it was announced that Nigeria was one of several countries being added to U.S. President Donald Trump's travel ban under Executive Order 13780. Trump highlighted security concerns, including that Nigeria "presents a high risk, relative to other countries in the world, of terrorist travel to the United States", but sources told the New York Times that his administration was concerned about Nigerians who illegally overstayed their visas. This was reminiscent of Trump's remarks at a meeting in June 2017, in which he had reportedly said that Nigerians would never "go back to their huts" after visiting the U.S. Nigeria's foreign minister, Geoffrey Onyeama, said that his government had been "somewhat blindsided" by the announcement – the U.S. had issued more than 7,920 immigrant visa to Nigerians in the 2018 fiscal year, the second-most of any African country – but that it was working to address the U.S.'s security concerns.

==== 2023 Nigerian presidential election ====
The 2023 Nigerian presidential election held in February 2023 has been seen as "the most wide-open since the country returned to democracy in 1999". U.S. President Joe Biden asked for Nigeria to hold elections peacefully, saying all candidates and parties have to respect the results which were informed by "the country's electoral commission". In a 1 March statement, the State Department congratulated Tinubu but urged INEC to improve processes before the state elections on 11 March.

==== Attack on U.S. Embassy staff ====
On May 16, 2023, two U.S. consulate members were killed after gunmen targeted a convoy of U.S. Embassy staffers in southeast Nigeria

==== Second Trump administration ====
In mid July 2025, Nigerian Foreign Minister Yusuf Tuggar criticized the second Trump administration for using tariffs and visas to exert pressure on Nigeria and other African states to accept third-country foreign deportees who had been deported from the US. In response, the United States Mission in Nigeria said that US visa policy changes were not result of any nation's stance on third-country origins but were motivated by a desire to safeguard US immigration systems.

Between late October and early November 2025, Trump threatened military action against Nigeria in response to the alleged genocide against Christians in Nigeria. Citing the violent killings of Christians and violations of religious freedom in Nigeria, Trump has ordered the United States Department of War to prepare for military action against Islamist militant groups in Nigeria. According to reports, Nigeria has long been the target of terrorist attacks by the extremist group Boko Haram, attacks that occur mostly in northern Nigeria, where the majority is Muslim. Also, according to reports from human rights groups, there is no evidence that only Christians are subject to violent attacks, and both religious groups, Muslims and Christians, face insecurity. Nigerian President Bola Tinubu rejected Trump's accusation and emphasized the Nigerian government's efforts to protect its citizens regardless of religion. The administration subsequently initiated a series of airstrikes against Islamic State-linked targets in the region in relation to the allegations.

== Economic relations ==
A notable feature of U.S.–Nigerian relations has been the stability of bilateral economic cooperation, which has largely proved resilient against diplomatic and political ruptures. The coldest eras of diplomatic relations – notably the mid-1970s and mid-1990s – carried surprisingly little damage for economic relations, and, indeed, American investment in Nigeria expanded in some sectors under General Abacha. One explanation is that the relationship lacks deep ideological or historical sources of tension, allowing the countries to repair disagreements quickly or to maintain lower-level cooperation during periods of high-level diplomatic estrangement. Both countries have therefore prioritised pragmatic concerns in their relations, especially since 1975. For the U.S., as the Department of State reported to the Senate Foreign Relations Committee in 1995, key among these pragmatic concerns is Nigeria's large consumer market and "vast natural resources and economic potential". In particular, Nigeria has been a reliable source of petroleum for the U.S. Indeed, academic Peter Lewis lamented in 2006 that, "the centrality of trade and investment in the petroleum sector is an unavoidable fact that eclipses other considerations in U.S. policy, and therefore constrains the repertoire of policy approaches".

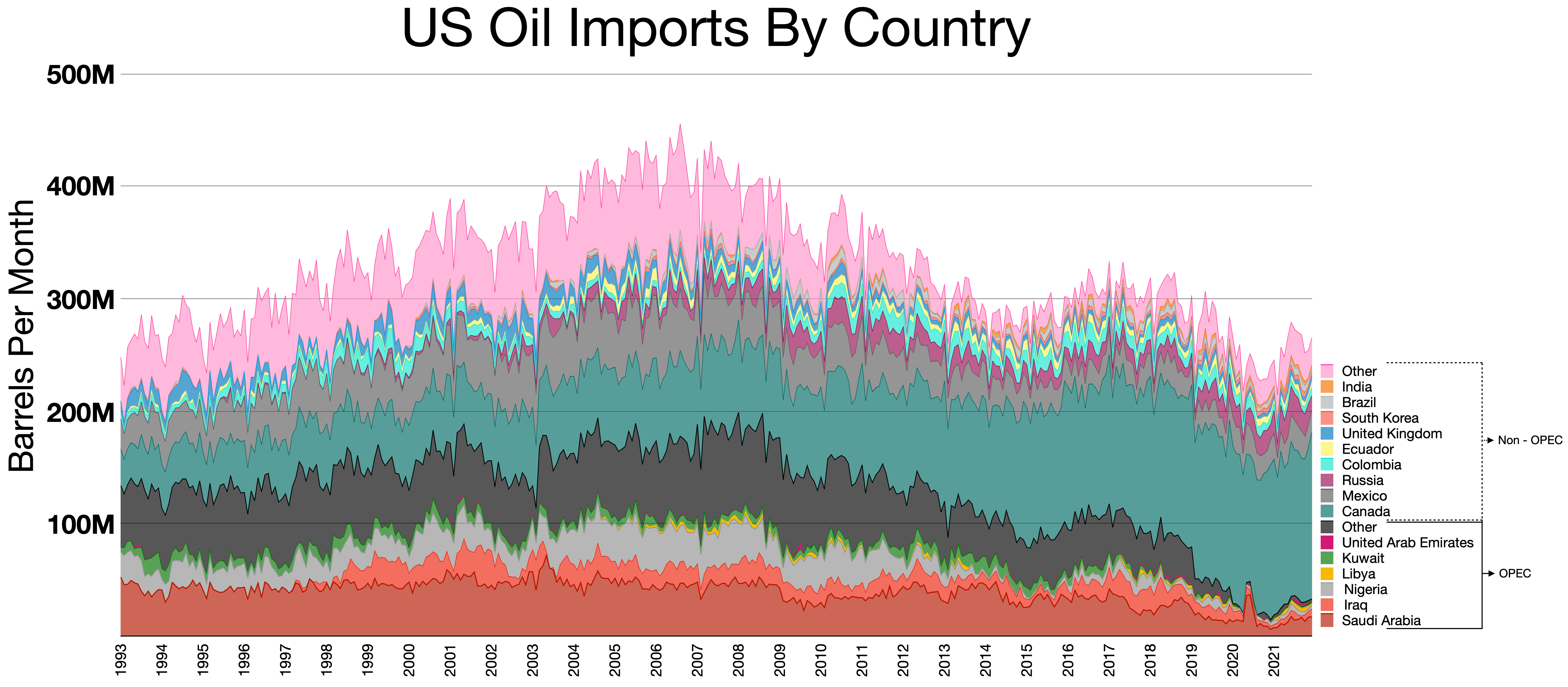
Graph of U.S. oil suppliers by volume, with Nigeria shown in grey.

=== Oil and gas ===
Commentators have considered Nigeria–U.S. relations as paradigmatic of so-called oil diplomacy: petroleum is often noted as the U.S.'s primary interest in the relationship, with the U.S. a major consumer of oil and Nigeria its main African producer. American multinationals, alongside other Western companies, have traditionally dominated oil production in the Niger Delta – in 2003, ChevronTexaco and ExxonMobil Corp together accounted for close to half of production. The U.S. has also had interests in Nigerian natural gas since at least 1973, when the American Guadalupe Gas Products Corporation concluded a natural gas exploitation agreement with the federal government, split 60–40 in the latter's favour. In 1977, American companies received permission to build a liquified natural gas plant in Nigeria, with a daily production capacity of two billion cubic feet of gas.

Moreover, Nigeria became an increasingly important oil supplier to the U.S. in the 1970s, given volatility in the Middle East and especially the 1973 Arab oil boycott. Nigeria declined to participate in the boycott, despite its membership in the Organization of the Petroleum Exporting Countries (OPEC). By 1980, Nigeria was the U.S.'s second-largest oil supplier, after Saudi Arabia: in that year, at least 46% of Nigerian oil exports went to the U.S., accounting for about 12% of U.S. oil imports. Nigeria's increased importance to the U.S.'s energy supply lent it improved status in American foreign policy from the mid-1970s. In the aftermath of September 11, when the U.S. again acquired an urgent interest in shifting away from Middle Eastern oil suppliers, the Bush administration declared Nigeria's oil resources to be of "strategic interest", and reportedly joined major oil multinationals in lobbying Nigeria to withdraw from OPEC.

However, both countries have diversified their trade in oil over the last decade. In 2020, Nigeria supplied the U.S. with over 24 million barrels of crude oil, about 1.1% of U.S. oil imports and about 4.8% of Nigerian oil exports. The table below shows how U.S. dependence on Nigerian oil has decreased since 1993:

U.S. crude oil imports from Nigeria, 1993–2021
Year	1993	1995	2000	2005	2010	2015	2019	2020	2021
Million barrels	263.5	226.5	320.1	393.0	358.9	19.9	68.1	24.4	39.4
Share of total	10.6%	8.6%	9.6%	10.6%	10.7%	0.7%	2.7%	1.1%	1.8%

=== Trade ===
In the early years after Nigerian independence in 1960, the U.S. share of Nigerian trade and investment was minor, dwarfed by that of Britain. By 1974, Britain remained Nigeria's main trading partner, but the U.S. was one of its top three markets for both imports and exports; and the following year, fuelled largely by the roaring trade in oil, the U.S. overtook Britain as Nigeria's single largest export market. The oil trade also resulted in impressive trade deficits for the U.S.: over $6.1 billion in 1977, and at least $9 billion in 1980. From the late 1970s, the U.S. undertook to offset the deficit by increasing its exports to Nigeria's sizeable market, but these efforts were severely hindered by economic restructuring in Nigeria, necessitated in the aftermath of an economic crisis. Particularly unpopular was the ban on wheat imports which Nigeria implemented between 1986 and 1993. The U.S., formerly Nigeria's main source of wheat imports, was persistent in protesting the ban throughout its lifespan, regarding it as unfair trade practice and threatening retaliatory measures.

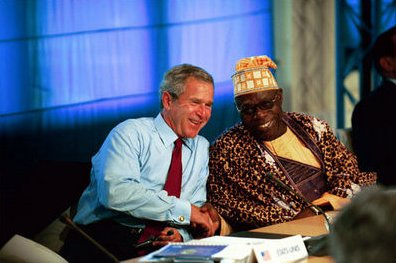
President Bush and President Obasanjo during a G8 Summit working session in Evian, France, 2003.

Shortly after Nigerian democratization, in 2000, Nigeria and the U.S. signed a Trade and Investment Framework Agreement, and Nigeria is eligible for preferential trade benefits under the Africa Growth and Opportunity Act, which was legislated in the same year. In 2019, the U.S. was the third largest market for Nigerian exports, behind China and India, at an annual value of $4.7 billion (9.9% of total Nigerian exports). As in the 20th century, Nigerian exports to the U.S. are dominated by fuel exports, which accounted for almost 97% of exports to the U.S. in 2019. In the same year, Nigerian imports in goods from the U.S. were worth $3.2 billion, making Nigeria the U.S.'s second largest export destination in Sub-Saharan Africa, and resulting in a historically modest U.S. trade deficit of $1.4 billion. Indeed, given a $1.7 billion surplus in trade in services, the U.S. had an overall trade surplus with Nigeria.

=== Investment ===
The U.S. has historically been an important source of foreign direct investment in Nigeria. During the twentieth century, U.S. investments in Nigeria were substantial and heavily concentrated in the oil sector. In 1972, American foreign investment amounted to about £250 million, more than one-third of total foreign investment in Nigeria and one-third of total American private investment in all developing African countries. This increased to $1 billion in 1974 and about $1.5 billion in 1977. Over the same period, Nigeria pursued with increasing vigour its indigenization policy, which aimed to reduce the domination of its economy by foreign-owned companies. The policy was inaugurated in 1972 under Gowon and significantly extended as the decade progressed. In 1976, the government announced mandatory Nigerian equity quotas (ranging between 40% and 100%) applying to all companies operating in Nigeria. The policy significantly reduced U.S. investment in Nigeria, and some American companies already operating in Nigeria, notably Citibank, pulled out of the country rather than comply with the quota. Others acquiesced: for example, Chase Manhattan, the First National Bank of Chicago, and the Bank of America each sold 60% of their local shares to the Nigerian Central Bank, which thus acquired a controlling stake on their local boards. The policy was applied particularly stringently to American banks, because the federal government resented that they operated as commercial banks but under merchant licenses.

Yet U.S. investment in Nigeria remained significant throughout the 1980s. Despite the political tensions of 1989 to 1995, Nigeria remained by far the most profitable host for U.S. foreign investment in Sub-Saharan Africa over that period, accounting for 71.4% of the U.S.'s total Sub-Saharan African profits. U.S. investment had increased to $3.9 billion by 1995, still largely concentrated in oil. Following the inauguration of the Fourth Republic in 1999, Nigeria expressed an interest in expanding and diversifying its sources of U.S. capital, but progress was slow – which the U.S. attributed to the absence of a conducive environment for investment in Nigeria.

In 2019, the stock of U.S. foreign direct investment in Nigeria was worth $5.5 billion, a 21.5% increase from the previous year. Nigerian foreign direct investment in the U.S. amounted to $105 million. According to the U.S. International Trade Administration, the U.S. was Nigeria's largest foreign investor as of 2021, with foreign direct investment concentrated in the oil, mining, and wholesale trade sectors.

=== Foreign aid ===
Nigeria is a major destination for U.S. foreign aid – in 2021, Nigeria was estimated to have been in the top ten recipients by volume. Between 2012 and 2021, the U.S.'s annual aid obligations in Nigeria ranged between $624 million and, in 2020, $1.11 billion. Aid is commonly dispersed in the humanitarian sector, the peace and security sector, and the health sector – in the latter case, especially under the President's Emergency Plan for AIDS Relief, which designates Nigeria as one of fifteen priority recipients.

In December 2025, Nigeria signed an agreement with the United States over health care assistance. The United States agreed to provide $2.1 billion in aid over the next five years, including $200 million for Christian health care centers. In return, Nigeria must invest $3 billion into its own health care system in this same time period. This deal was part of a larger effort by the Trump administration to procure bilateral aid agreements that differ from the multilateral approach taken by the World Health Organization and differ from traditional USAID delivery methods. The United States has signed similar deals with 16 other African countries as of March 2026.

== Cultural and diplomatic relations ==
=== Nigerian diaspora in the U.S. ===
Nigeria is distinguished from other African nations by the extent of its population's ties to the U.S. In addition to the large number of African Americans who trace their ancestry back to Nigeria, significant links of "culture and community" arise from the large Nigerian American community in the U.S., which is known for being politically and culturally active. In 2000, the U.S. Census recorded 87,000 Nigerian-born residents, whose U.S-born children amounted to a further 100,000 or 200,000 residents – although this was regarded as an under-estimate. A study conducted around that time estimated that Nigerians sent more than $1.3 billion annually to Nigeria in family remittances, a figure that dwarfed the flow of official foreign aid. It has also long been established practice – especially prominent during the 1970s and 1980s – for large numbers of Nigerians to seek higher education in the U.S., and sometimes to stay there afterwards. In the early 2000s, this led to concern about a Nigeria-to-U.S. "brain drain".

=== Nigerian public opinion ===
Recent polls show that Nigeria is a consistently pro-American country. In 2019, the last year in which the Pew Research Center conducted its global attitudes polling, 62% of Nigerians had favourable views of the U.S., with 23% expressing a negative view. Though this constituted a significant decrease in favourability from 81% in 2010, the first year in which the poll was taken. In 2018, 69% of Nigerians believed that the U.S. respected its people's freedoms, about the same as in 2013. During Obama's presidency, Pew Research found that 84% of Nigerians in 2010 had confidence in Obama to do the right thing in world affairs, decreasing to 53% between 2013 and 2014, rising to 73% in 2015, and decreasing to 63% at the end of his presidency.

After Trump's election in the United States, a 2017 BBC World Service poll found that positive views of the U.S. increased among Nigerians from 59% (2014) to 68% rather than sharing the same decline found in many other countries, making Nigeria the country with the highest positive views of the U.S. out of any country polled. Throughout his presidency, Pew Research found that 58-59% of Nigerians maintained confidence in Trump to do the right thing in world affairs, the fourth highest percentage globally after Israel, the Philippines, and Kenya. The Washington Post and The Guardian have reported a significant Nigerian public admiration towards Trump, particularly among southern Christians and Biafran secessionists. Biafran secessionist group Indigenous People of Biafra (IPOB) held a parade in support of Donald Trump in January 2017. In November 2020, IPOB leader Nnamdi Kanu accepted an invitation to attend a Trump rally in Iowa as a special VIP guest.

In a 2020 Gallup poll, 56% of Nigerians approved of U.S. leadership – higher than European approval of U.S. leadership, which was measured at 24%.

=== Diplomatic missions ===
At the end of March 2022, construction began on a new consulate general campus in Lagos, which is expected to be completed in 2027 and will be the largest U.S. consulate in the world. Academic Peter Lewis has lamented the closure of U.S. facilities in other parts of the country, arguing that it has reduced the U.S.'s capacity for intelligence and representation.

The U.S.–Nigeria Bilateral Commission was established in 2010 and meets regularly. The U.S. and Nigeria are both members of the United Nations, the International Monetary Fund, the World Bank, and the World Trade Organization, among others. Nigeria is also an observer to the Organization of American States.

In 2020, a large group of protesters gathered outside the residence of the Nigeria ambassador in Maryland. This was due to an incident of the Nigerian police firing protests against the controversial police task force SARS.

== Resident diplomatic missions ==
of Nigeria in the United States

- Washington, D.C. (Embassy)
- Atlanta (Consulate-General)
- New York City (Consulate-General)

of the United States in Nigeria

- Abuja (Embassy)
- Lagos (Consulate-General)

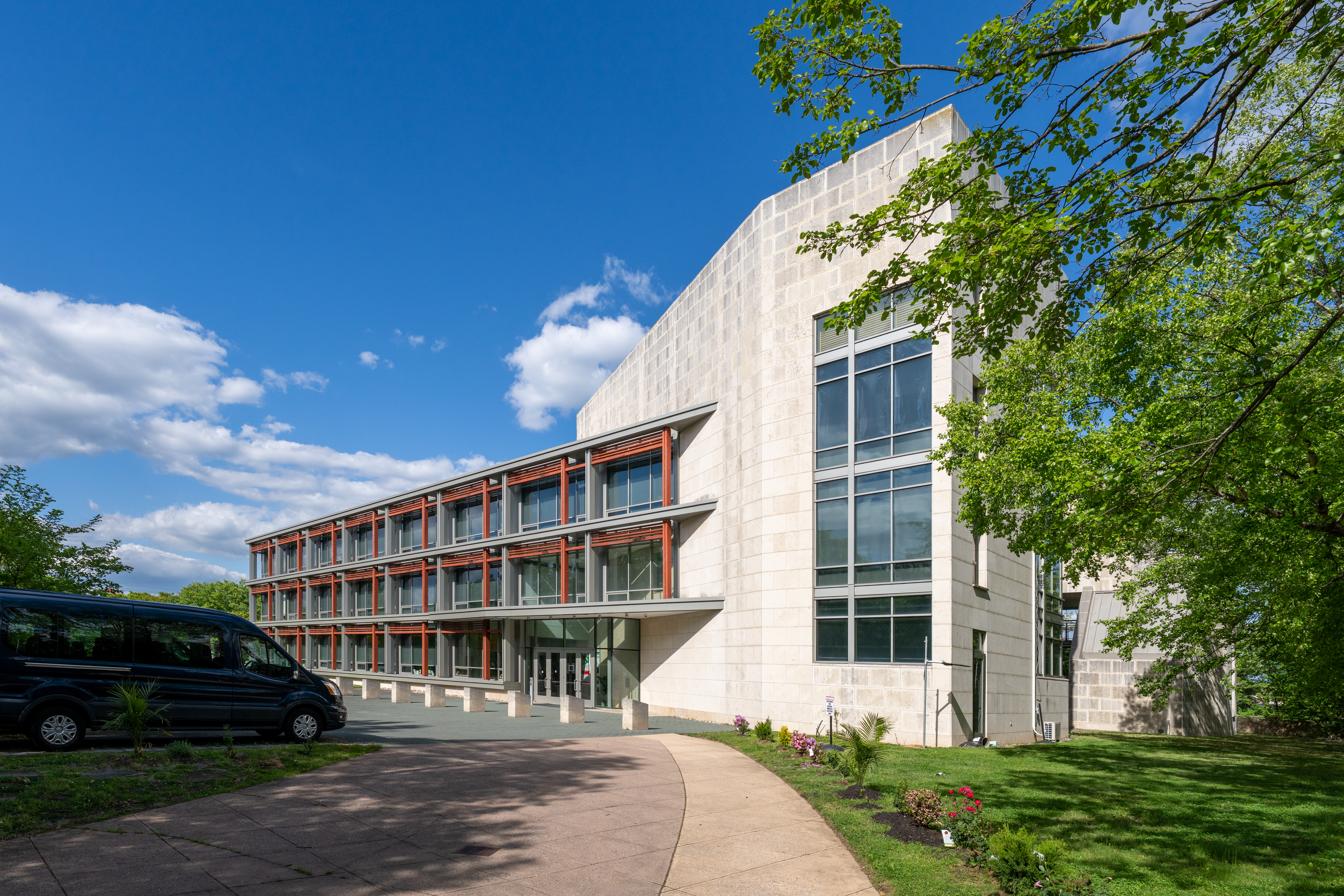
Embassy of Nigeria in Washington, D.C.

== Military cooperation ==
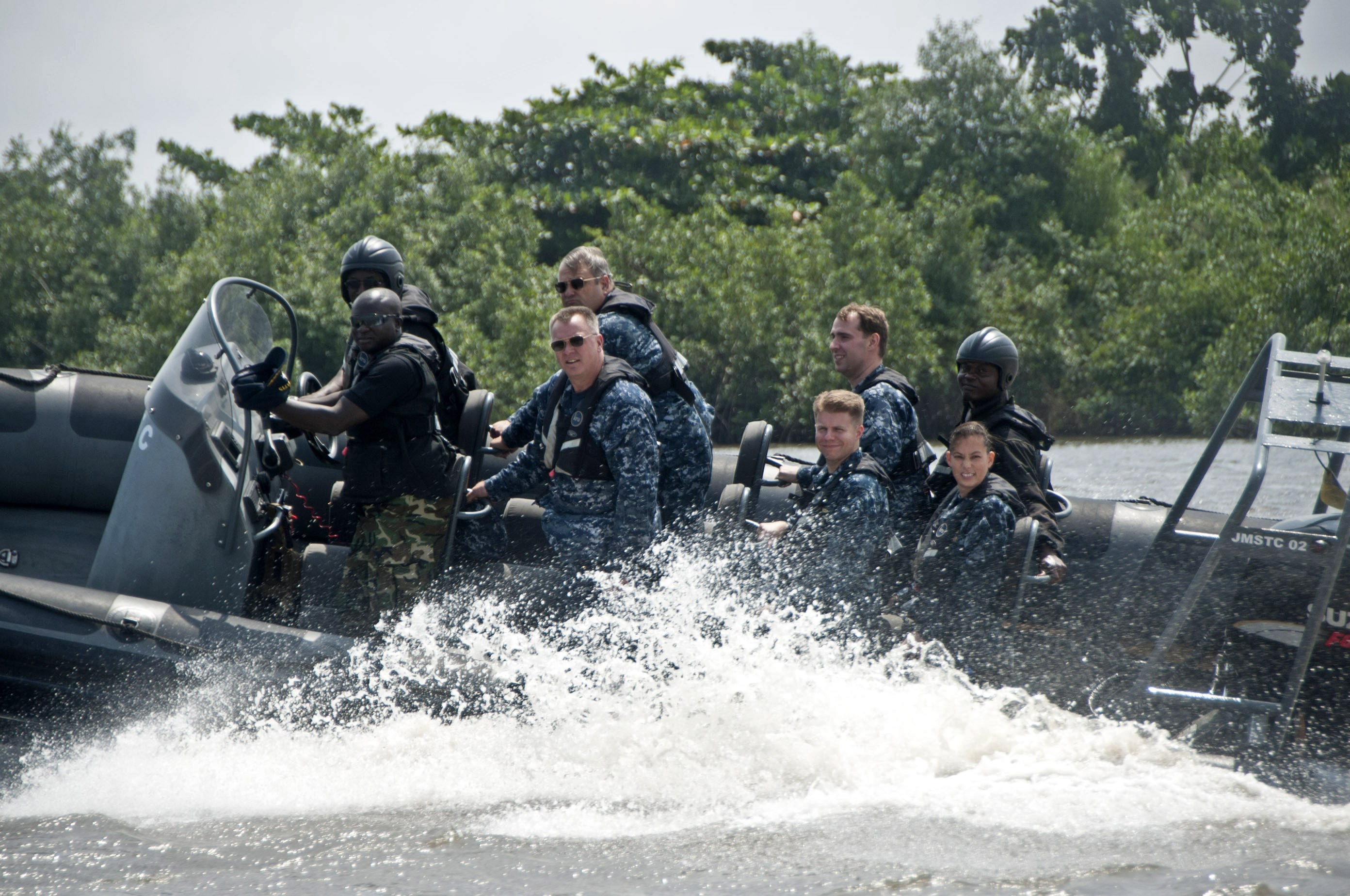
U.S. Navy personnel ride along on a Nigerian boat as part of an Africa Partnership Station exercise, 2011.

Nigerian–U.S. military cooperation under George W. Bush's administration was centred on the Africa Center for Strategic Studies and the Africa Crisis Response Initiative. In 2007, Bush's administration established the Africa Partnership Station, which has been a hub for cooperation against piracy, drug trafficking, oil theft, and border fraud in the Gulf of Guinea. Currently, Nigeria is a member of the Global Coalition to Defeat ISIS (D-ISIS), and the U.S. and Nigeria co-hosted a virtual D-ISIS conference in October 2020. It also receives U.S. military support as a member of the Africa Military Education Program and as a member since 2005 of the Trans-Sahara Counterterrorism Partnership; and in 2020 it bought over $1.2 million in defense equipment from the U.S. In addition, a member of the U.S. Army Corps of Engineers has been stationed permanently at the Kainji Airbase in Nigeria, to oversee key U.S. Africa Command projects there.

Collaborations between the California National Guard and the Federal Government in Nigeria have included trainings to combat Boko Haram and trainings for programs like the Agro Rangers and those related to disaster relief.

=== Chibok schoolgirls kidnapping ===
In the international outrage that followed the Chibok schoolgirls kidnapping in northern Nigeria in April 2014, Obama committed on 6 May that the U.S. was "going to do everything we can to provide assistance" to Nigeria. The U.S. sent an interdisciplinary team to assist the Nigerian military, initially comprising 38 members, including two Federal Bureau of Investigation hostage specialists and several military intelligence analysts. 80 American troops were deployed shortly afterwards. In the early stages of the mission, the U.S. team acquired commercial satellite imagery and flew crewed intelligence, surveillance and reconnaissance flights over Nigeria.

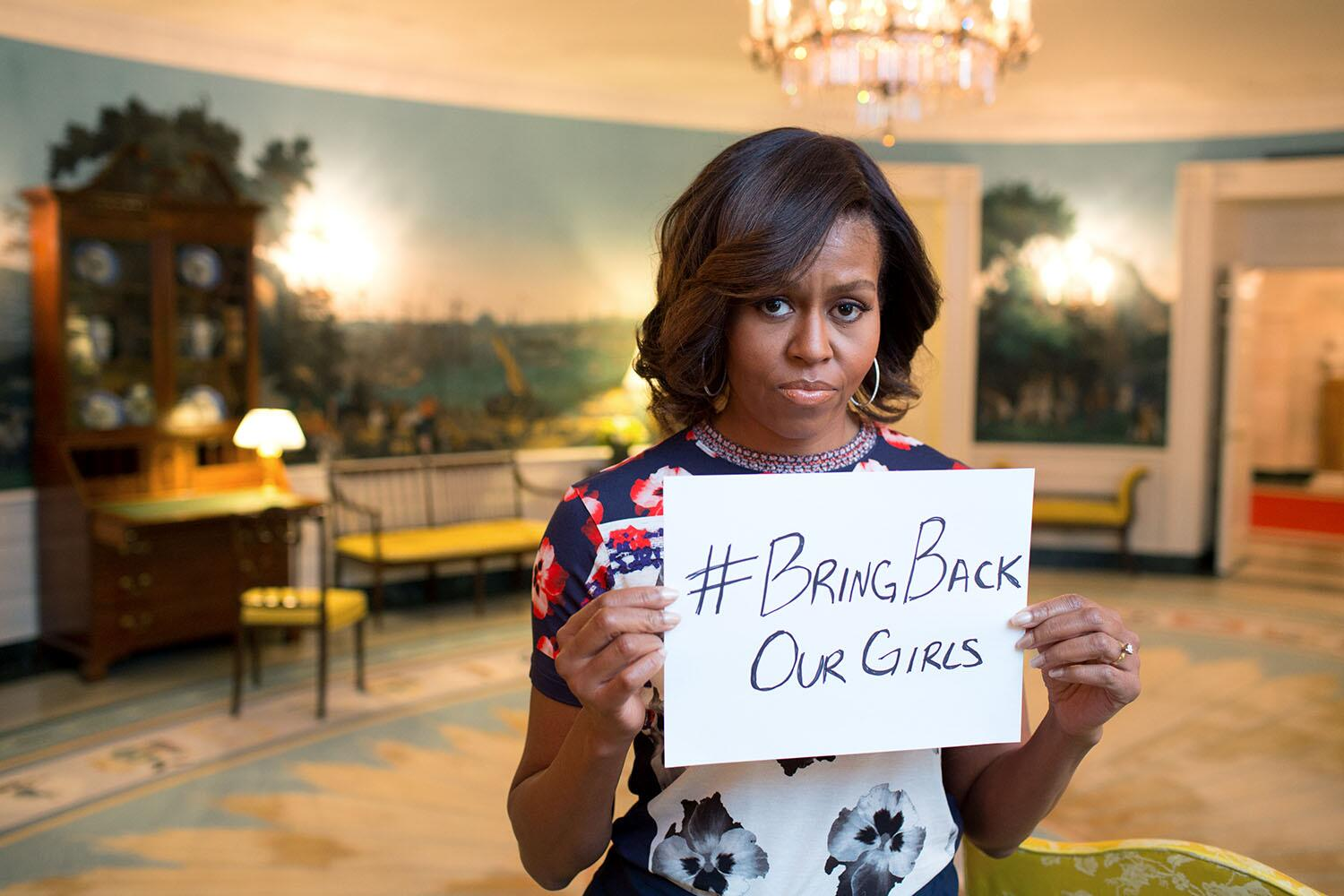
On Twitter in May 2014, U.S. First Lady Michelle Obama joined the viral drive to "bring back our girls" after the Chibok kidnapping.

However, U.S. officials complained that Nigeria had responded too slowly in accepting and implementing the U.S.'s offer of assistance, and it was later reported that there had been tensions between the U.S. team and Nigerian officials. Among the sources of these tensions, in the early months of the mission, was the U.S.'s refusal to share its raw intelligence with the Nigerian military, due to concerns about corruption in, and a possible Boko Haram infiltration of, Nigerian units. Foreign Policy reported that U.S. personnel were also concerned that the intelligence would be used for a crackdown on Nigerian civilians, given what a U.S. officer referred to as the Nigerian military's propensity for "heavy-handed" and "imprecise" operations. Although limited multilateral intelligence-sharing protocols were agreed to, the Pentagon later complained that Nigeria failed to follow up on important leads resulting from U.S. intelligence. As of 2021 the mission to rescue the kidnapped girls had not succeeded.

=== Military action against Boko Haram and the Islamic State ===
The first U.S. congressional hearing on Boko Haram was held in November 2011, in the aftermath of the Abuja UN bombing and the Abuja police headquarters bombing, and at the urging of Congressman Pat Meehan and Congresswoman Jackie Speier. The Obama administration classified the group as a terrorist organisation in 2013. However, tensions which surfaced during the mission to rescue the Chibok schoolgirls continued to hamper cooperation between the U.S. and Nigerian militaries. The New York Times reported "a breakdown in trust" between them, largely due to continued U.S. concerns about corruption, disloyalty, and human rights abuses by Nigerian personnel, which led the U.S. Department of Defense to cooperate more closely with officials in neighbouring countries – Chad, Cameroon, and Niger – while bypassing consultation with the Nigerians. Offended by the continued U.S. refusal to share raw intelligence, in December 2014 Nigeria cancelled the last stage of an initiative under which U.S. personnel trained Nigerian troops in counterinsurgency. In late 2015, the U.S. deployed troops to Cameroon to support the fight against Boko Haram on the Nigeria–Cameroon border.

In December 2025, in cooperation with the Nigerian government and army, the United States targeted ISIS militants in Sokoto State, northwestern Nigeria over rising violence perpetrated by Islamic militants associated with ISWAP and Lakurawa. The strikes occurred after "credible intelligence and careful operational planning" and led to multiple militant casualties being reported by US authorities.

Following a Nigerian request for training assistance, technical support and intelligence-sharing, the United States dispatched 100 soldiers in mid-February 2026 to train Nigerian forces to combat Islamic militants and other armed groups.

== Public opinion ==
In a 2023 Pew Research Center survey, 74% of Nigerians had positive views of the United States, with 20% expressing a negative view. According to a 2026 Pew Research Center survey, 65% of Nigerians had a favorable view of the United States, while 31% had a negative view.

== State visits ==
The following is a list of visits by Nigerian heads of state to the U.S. and visits by U.S. heads of state to Nigeria.

Visits by Nigerian and U.S. heads of state, 1960–2021
Head of state	Country	Year	Dates	Description
Prime Minister Abubakar Tafawa Balewa	Nigeria	1960	October 8	Met with President Dwight D. Eisenhower during a visit to the UN General Assembly.
Prime Minister Abubakar Tafawa Balewa	Nigeria	1961	July 25–28	Official visit.
Lieutenant General Olusegun Obasanjo	Nigeria	1977	October 10–13	State visit with President Jimmy Carter.
President Jimmy Carter	U.S.	1978	March 31–April 3	Met with head of state Olusegun Obasanjo.
President Shehu Shagari	Nigeria	1980	October 3–8	Official visit.
President-elect Olusegun Obasanjo	Nigeria	1999	March 30	Met with President Bill Clinton during a private visit.
President Olusegun Obasanjo	Nigeria	1999	October 27–30	Official working visit.
President Bill Clinton	U.S.	2000	August 26–28	Met with President Olusegun Obasanjo and addressed the National Assembly.
President Olusegun Obasanjo	Nigeria	2001	May 10–12	Working visit.
President Olusegun Obasanjo	Nigeria	2001	November 2	Met with President George W. Bush during a private visit.
President Olusegun Obasanjo	Nigeria	2002	June 20	Met with President George W. Bush during a private visit.
President George W. Bush	U.S.	2003	July 11–2	Met with President Olusegun Obasanjo.
President Olusegun Obasanjo	Nigeria	2004	June 10–11	Met with President George W. Bush during the G8 Economic Summit; attended the funeral of former President Ronald Reagan.
President Olusegun Obasanjo	Nigeria	2004	December 2–3	Working visit.
President Olusegun Obasanjo	Nigeria	2005	May 5	Working visit.
President Olusegun Obasanjo	Nigeria	2006	March 28–29	Working visit.
President Umaru Musa Yar'Adua	Nigeria	2007	December 12–15	Working visit.
Acting President Goodluck Jonathan	Nigeria	2010	April 11–13	Attended the Nuclear Security Summit.
President Goodluck Jonathan	Nigeria	2011	June 8	Working visit.
President Goodluck Jonathan	Nigeria	2013	September 23	Met with President Barack Obama at the UN General Assembly.
President Goodluck Jonathan	Nigeria	2014	August 5–6	Attended the U.S.–Africa Leaders Summit.
President Muhammadu Buhari	Nigeria	2015	July 20–21	Official working visit.
President Muhammadu Buhari	Nigeria	2016	March 31–April 1	Attended the Nuclear Security Summit.
President Muhammadu Buhari	Nigeria	2018	April 29–May 1	Official working visit.

== See also ==
- Foreign relations of Nigeria
- Foreign relations of the United States
- List of United States ambassadors to Nigeria

== Bibliography ==
=== Academic ===
- Adebanwi, Wade (2012). "Glocal Naming and Shaming: Toponymic (Inter) National Relations on Lagos and New York's Streets". African Affairs. 111 (445): 640–661. doi:10.1093/afraf/ads055. JSTOR 23357173.
- Aka, Philip C. (2002). "The Dividend of Democracy: Analyzing U.S. Support for Nigerian Democratization". Boston College Third World Law Journal. 22 (2): 225–280.
- Akpuru-Aja, Aja (2003). "The State and the Military: Perspectives on Nigeria–USA Military Cooperation". Strategic Analysis. 27 (2): 250–262. doi:10.1080/09700160308450086. S2CID 153539617.
- Aluko, Olajide (1979). "Nigeria, the United States and Southern Africa". African Affairs. 78 (310): 91–102. doi:10.1093/oxfordjournals.afraf.a097083. JSTOR 721376.
- Ayam, John A. (2008). "The Development of Nigeria–U.S. Relations". Journal of Third World Studies. 25 (2): 117–132. JSTOR 45194482.
- Booker, Salih; Minter, William (2003). "The U.S. and Nigeria: Thinking Beyond Oil". Great Decisions. Foreign Policy Association. pp. 43–54. JSTOR 43682259.
- Campbell, Ian (1994). "Nigeria: The Election That Never Was". Democratization. 1 (2): 309–322. doi:10.1080/13510349408403394.
- Fainberg, Anthony (2009). "The Terrorist Threat to Inbound U.S. Passenger Flights: Inadequate Government Response". Homeland Security Affairs. 5 (5).
- Hoffman, Adonis (1996). "Nigeria: The Policy Conundrum". Foreign Policy. No. 101. pp. 146–158. JSTOR 1149414.
- Lewis, Peter (2006). "The Dysfunctional State of Nigeria" (PDF). In Birdsall, Nancy; Vaishnav, Milan; Ayres, Robert L. (eds.). Short of the Goal: U.S. Policy and Poorly Performing States. Center for Global Development. pp. 83–116. ISBN 978-1-933286-05-1.
- Noer, Thomas J. (1993). "International Credibility and Political Survival: The Ford Administration's Intervention in Angola". Presidential Studies Quarterly. 23 (4): 771–785. ISSN 0360-4918. JSTOR 27551153.
- Nwachuku, Levi A. (1998). "The United States and Nigeria – 1960 to 1987: Anatomy of a Pragmatic Relationship". Journal of Black Studies. 28 (5): 575–593. doi:10.1177/002193479802800504. JSTOR 2784795. S2CID 145508814.
- Obot, Isidore S (2004). "Assessing Nigeria's Drug Control Policy, 1994–2000". International Journal of Drug Policy. 15 (1): 17–26. doi:10.1016/S0955-3959(03)00110-5.
- Ogunbadejo, Oye (1976). "Nigeria and the Great Powers: The Impact of the Civil War on Nigerian Foreign Relations". African Affairs. 75 (298): 14–32. doi:10.1093/oxfordjournals.afraf.a096696. JSTOR 721864.
- Ogunbadejo, Oye (1979). "A New Turn in U.S.–Nigerian Relations". The World Today. 35 (3): 117–126. ISSN 0043-9134. JSTOR 40395104.
- Page, Matthew T. (2016-07-01). Improving U.S. Anticorruption Policy in Nigeria (Report). Council on Foreign Relations.
- Solomon, Hussein (2013). "The African State and the Failure of US Counterterrorism Initiatives in Africa: The Cases of Nigeria and Mali". South African Journal of International Affairs. 20 (3): 427–445. doi:10.1080/10220461.2013.841804. S2CID 154088523.
- Veney, Cassandra Rachel (2019). "The Role of the United States in Nigeria's Conflicts – the Niger Delta and Northeastern Nigeria". Africa Insight. 49 (3): 116–129. hdl:10520/EJC-1d522a5820.

=== News ===
- "A Letter by Ford Angers Nigerians". The New York Times. 1976-01-08. ISSN 0362-4331.
- "Kissinger Offers U.S. Help in Rhodesia Negotiations". The New York Times. 1976-04-29. ISSN 0362-4331.
- "Nigeria May Ask U.S. Ambassador About Bombings". The New York Times. 1997-07-17. ISSN 0362-4331.
- "Chibok Schoolgirls: U.S. Will Not Share Military Intelligence with Nigeria – Officials". Premium Times Nigeria. 2014-05-14.
- "US places Nigeria on watch-list of countries that violate religious freedom". Vanguard News. 2019-12-21.
- Ahmad, Romoke W (2014-05-08). "Nigeria: Chibok – U.S. Envoy Meets Security Operatives, Drone Action Likely". Daily Trust. AllAfrica.
- Akinwotu, Emmanuel (2020-10-31). "'He just says it as it is': why many Nigerians support Donald Trump". The Guardian.
- Cooper, Helene (2015-01-24). "Rifts Between U.S. and Nigeria Impeding Fight Against Boko Haram". The New York Times. ISSN 0362-4331.
- Crawford, Jamie (2015-10-14). "US Deploys Troops to Africa". CNN.
- Darnton, John (1976-05-01). "U.S. Opening to Africa Finds Nigerian Doors Shut". The New York Times. ISSN 0362-4331.
- Darnton, John (1976-02-18). "Nigerians Storm British and U.S. Offices". The New York Times. ISSN 0362-4331.
- Darnton, John (1976-10-30). "Nigeria's 'Indigenization' Policy Under Fire". The New York Times. ISSN 0362-4331.
- Darnton, John (1977-03-14). "Nigeria Arrests, Then Expels The Times's West Africa Correspondent". The New York Times. ISSN 0362-4331.
- "Sharp Drop in World Views of US, UK: Global Poll". GlobeScan. 2017-07-04.
- Gordon, Michael R. (2015-01-25). "Kerry Meets With Nigerian Leaders to Encourage Peaceful Election". The New York Times. ISSN 0362-4331.
- Hartman, Carl (1995-11-11). "U.S. Recalls Ambassador After Nigeria Executes Nine Activists". Associated Press.
- Jakes, Lara (2020-02-05). "Nigeria 'Blindsided' by Trump Travel Ban, Its Top Diplomat Says". The New York Times. ISSN 0362-4331.
- Kanno-Youngs, Zolan (2020-01-31). "Trump Administration Adds Six Countries to Travel Ban". The New York Times. ISSN 0362-4331.
- Kaufman, Michael T. (1978-03-31). "Carter Trip to Nigeria Culminates Long Effort to Improve Relations". The New York Times. ISSN 0362-4331.
- Kokim, Desmond (2015-08-04). "Arms Trade: US to Remove Nigeria from Leahy Law Restriction". The Africa Report.
- Lewis, Simon (2021-11-18). "U.S. removes Nigeria from religious freedom list ahead of Blinken visit". Reuters.
- Lippman, Thomas W. (1995-07-20). "Secret U.S. Diplomacy Fails to Nudge Nigeria". The Washington Post.
- Lubold, Gordon (2014-05-19). "U.S., Nigeria Agree to Share Intelligence to Find Schoolgirls". Foreign Policy.
- McConville, Kieran (2022-02-07). "Foreign Aid by Country: Who is Getting the Most — and How Much?". Concern Worldwide.
- Miller, Zeke K. (2014-05-21). "U.S. Deploys Troops in Search for Kidnapped Nigerian Girls". Time.
- Opeyemi, Stanley (2015-02-05). "Nigeria Calls for a Re-think of the Leahy law". The Hill.
- Ottaway, David B. (1978-04-01). "Carter Arrives in Nigeria on State Visit". The Washington Post.
- Parkinson, Joe; Henshaw, Drew (2021-04-03). "When America Couldn't Bring Back Our Girls". The Atlantic.
- Schmitt, Eric (2015-01-01). "With Schoolgirls Taken by Boko Haram Still Missing, U.S.-Nigeria Ties Falter". The New York Times. ISSN 0362-4331.
- Shear, Michael D.; Davis, Julie Hirschfeld (2017-12-23). "Stoking Fears, Trump Defied Bureaucracy to Advance Immigration Agenda". The New York Times. ISSN 0362-4331.
- Sherwood, Harriet (2014-05-14). "Boko Haram Abduction: US and UK Step Up Military Effort to Find Girls". The Guardian.
- Stewart, Phil (2014-05-19). "U.S. Reaches Agreement with Nigeria on Intelligence Sharing". Reuters.
- Weller, Robert (1985-10-08). "Nigerian leader says he may reject IMF loan". AP News.
- Zengerle, Patricia (2014-05-15). "U.S. Criticizes Nigeria Over Kidnapping Response". Reuters.

=== Official ===
- Barraza, Alfredo (2021-03-02). "USACE Establishes Permanent Presence in Africa to Support Key Missions". U.S. Army.
- Carter, Jimmy (1978-04-01). "Remarks at the National Arts Theatre, Lagos". The American Presidency Project.
- Hudson, David (2014-05-07). "U.S. to Help Nigeria in the Search for Kidnapped Girls". The Obama White House.
- Kassebaum, Nancy Landon (1995). "S.1419 Nigeria Democracy Act". United States Congress.
- Moose, George E. (1995-07-31). "Assessment of U.S.–Nigeria Relations". United States Department of State Dispatch. 6 (31): 603–606.
- "Diplomatic Missions in the US". Nigerian Consulate, Atlanta U.S.A. 2022.
- Office of the Historian (2022a). "Nigeria: A Guide to the United States' History of Recognition, Diplomatic, and Consular Relations, by Country, since 1776". United States Department of State.
- Office of the Historian (2022b). "Nigeria: Visits by Foreign Leaders". United States Department of State.
- Office of the Historian (2022c). "Jimmy Carter: Travels of the President". United States Department of State.
- Office of the Historian (2022d). "William J. Clinton: Travels of the President". United States Department of State.
- Office of the Historian (2022e). "George W. Bush: Travels of the President". United States Department of State.
- "Annual Statistical Bulletin". OPEC. 2021.
- Payne, Donald M. (1995). "H.R.2697 Nigeria Democracy Act". United States Congress.
- Pew Research Center (March 2022). "Nigeria Global Indicators Database". Global Attitudes Project.
- Trump, Donald J. (2020-01-31). "Proclamation on Improving Enhanced Vetting Capabilities and Processes for Detecting Attempted Entry". The White House. Archived from the original on 2020-03-01.
- "World Population Dashboard". United Nations Population Fund. 2022.
- "U.S., Nigeria Celebrate Historic Groundbreaking of New U.S. Consulate General in Lagos". U.S. Embassy and Consulate in Nigeria. 2022-03-31.
- "U.S. Department of State to Host the 2020 U.S.–Nigeria Binational Commission Meeting". United States Department of State. 2020-01-31.
- "U.S. Security Cooperation with Nigeria". United States Department of State. 2022-04-14.
- "U.S. Crude Oil Imports". United States Energy Information Administration. 2022-05-31.
- United States Government (2022). "Nigeria". United States Foreign Assistance.
- United States International Trade Administration (2021-10-13). "Nigeria Country Commercial Guide". United States Department of Commerce.
- United States Trade Representative. "Nigeria". Executive Office of the President.
- * White House Press Secretary (2015-07-20). "Remarks by President Obama and President Buhari of Nigeria Before Bilateral Meeting". The Obama White House.
- World Bank (2022). "Nigeria Trade". WITS Data.
