= 2011 Abuja bombing =

- 2011 Abuja bombing may refer to:
- 2011 Abuja police headquarters bombing
- 2011 Abuja United Nations bombing
