= 2010 Abuja attacks =

2010 Abuja attacks may refer to:

- October 2010 Abuja bombings
- December 2010 Abuja bombing
