= Embassy of the United States, Abuja =

Diplomatic mission of the United States to Nigeria

- Address: 1075 Diplomatic Drive, Central District Area, Abuja
- Coordinates: 9.040812°N 7.477562°E
- Opened: October 1, 1960 (original chancery in Lagos); September 15, 2000 (current chancery in Abuja)
- Renovated: January 2012 – October 2014
- Ambassador: Vacant
- Chargé d'affaires: Keith Heffern
- Website: ng.usembassy.gov

The Embassy of the United States in Abuja is the diplomatic mission of the United States in the Federal Republic of Nigeria. It is located at 1075 Diplomatic Drive in Abuja, the capital of Nigeria.

The current envoy is Richard M. Mills Jr., serving as ambassador to Nigeria since July 25, 2024, having been confirmed by the U.S. Senate on May 2, 2024.

== History ==
=== Establishment of relations ===
The United States and Nigeria established bilateral relations on October 1, 1960, the day that Nigeria gained its independence from the United Kingdom. On that day, Nigeria opened its embassy in Washington, D.C., the U.S. capital, and the United States opened its embassy in Lagos.

== Chancery building ==
The original chancery in Lagos was in use from 1960 until 2000, when the embassy was transferred to the current building in Abuja, alongside the embassies of other countries. The current chancery building in Abuja was opened on September 15, 2000.
