= Embassy of Nigeria, Washington, D.C. =

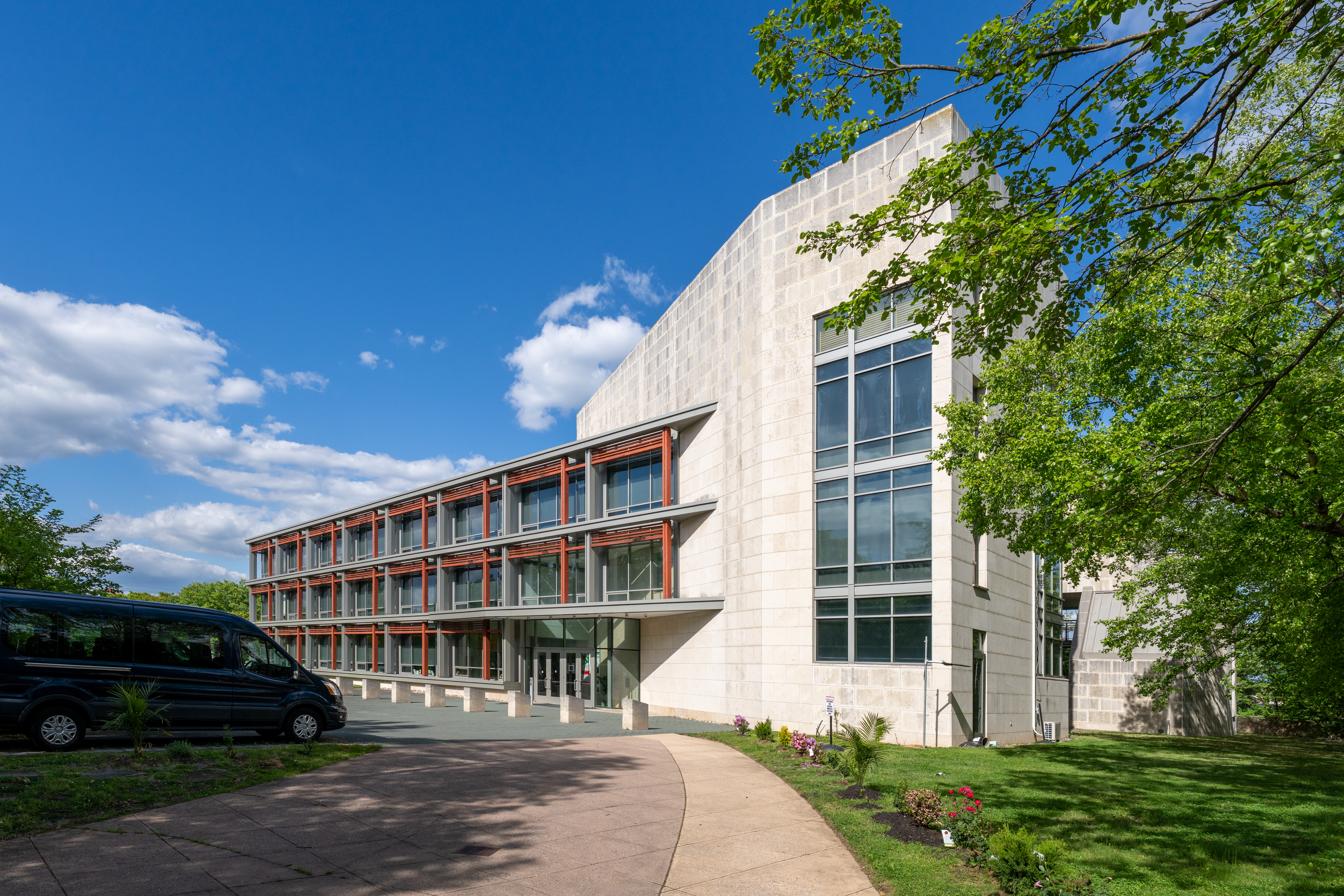
- Location: Washington, D.C.
- Address: 3519 International Drive, N.W.
- Coordinates: 38°56′38.9″N 77°4′5.5″W
- Ambassador: Uzoma Emenike

The Embassy of Nigeria in Washington, D.C. is the diplomatic mission of the Federal Republic of Nigeria to the United States.

Its chancery is located on a crest of a hill at 3519 International Court NW, in the Cleveland Park neighborhood of Washington, DC.

The Ambassador is Uzoma Emenike.

== Chancery ==
The architects, led by Robert Sponseller of Shalom Baranes Associates, designed the building to represent life in a Nigerian village. It features individual buildings build concentrically around a central courtyard, beneath a common roof.

Along with the embassies of the People's Republic of China and Malaysia, it is one of the largest buildings in the International Drive diplomatic district, with around 100,000 square feet (9,300 m^{2}) of space.

Work had begun on a new chancery in the late 1980s, but political instability in Nigeria delayed serious work for nearly a decade. Approved by the National Capital Planning Commission on March 4, 1999, construction was completed in early 2002. It was officially commissioned on May 5, 2003 by Nigerian Vice President Atiku Abubakar.

The Washington chapter of the American Institute of Architects awarded the chancery a 2002 award for excellence in architecture, and it was featured on the cover of the Winter 2003 issue of their magazine, Architecture DC.

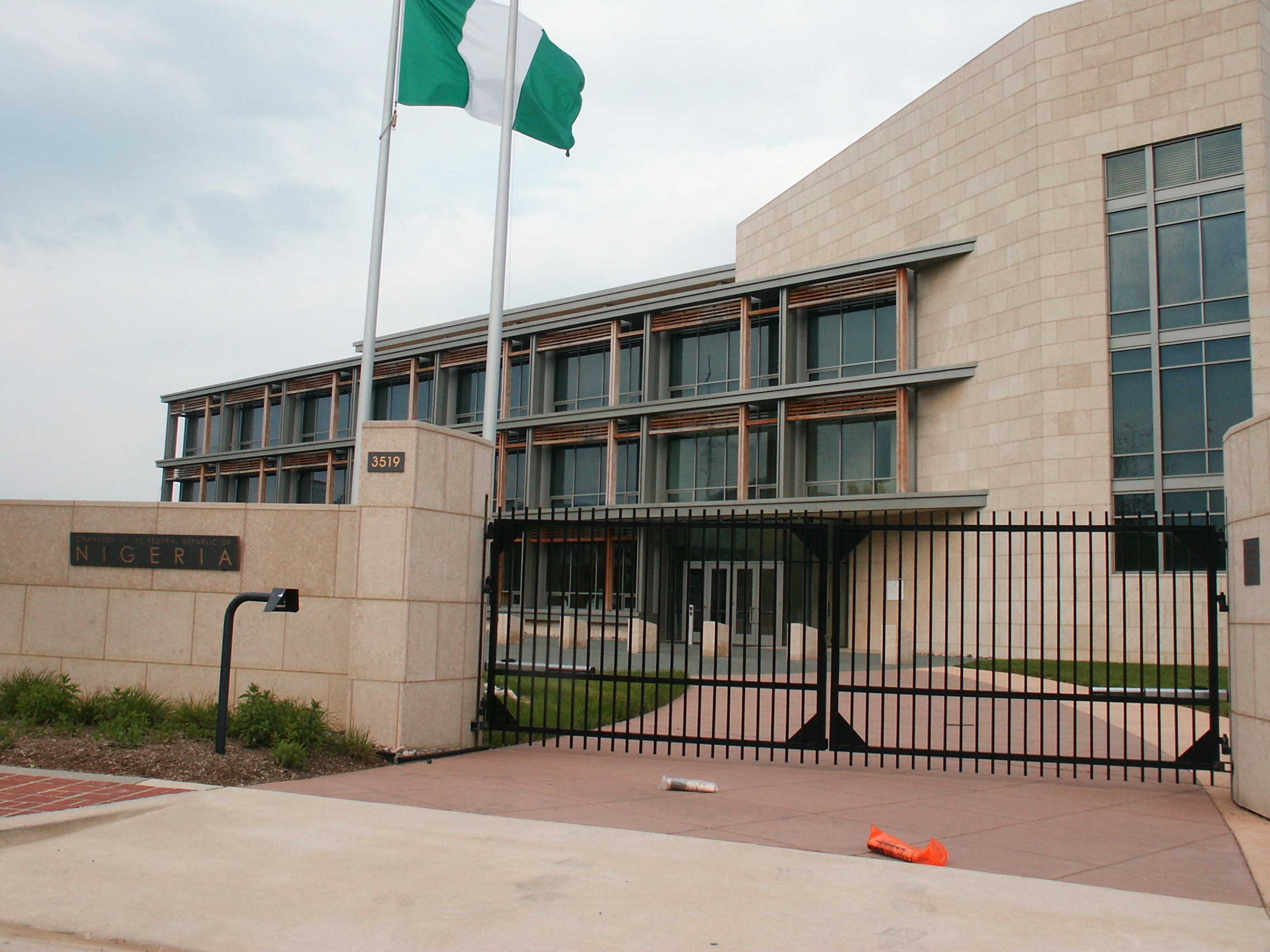

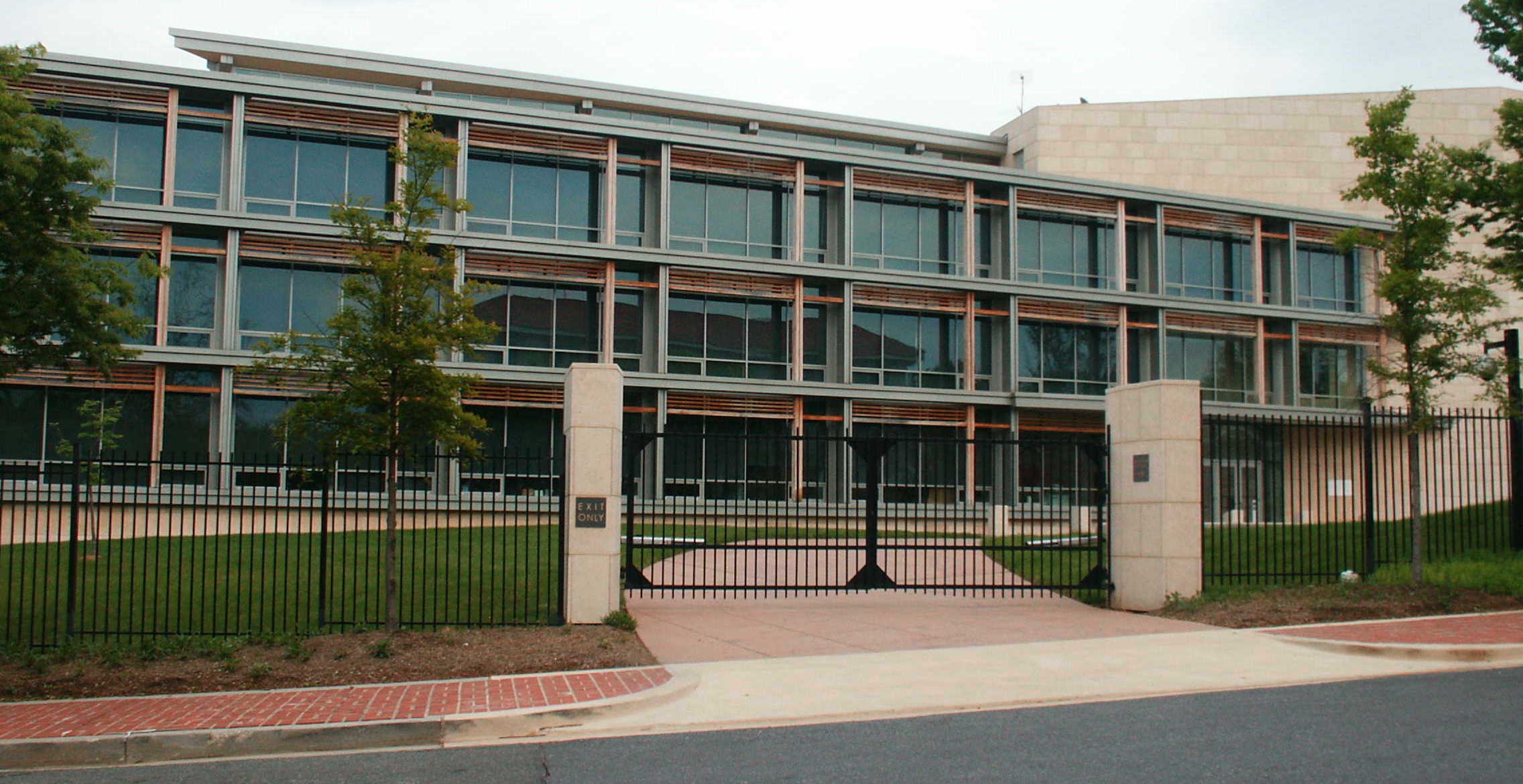

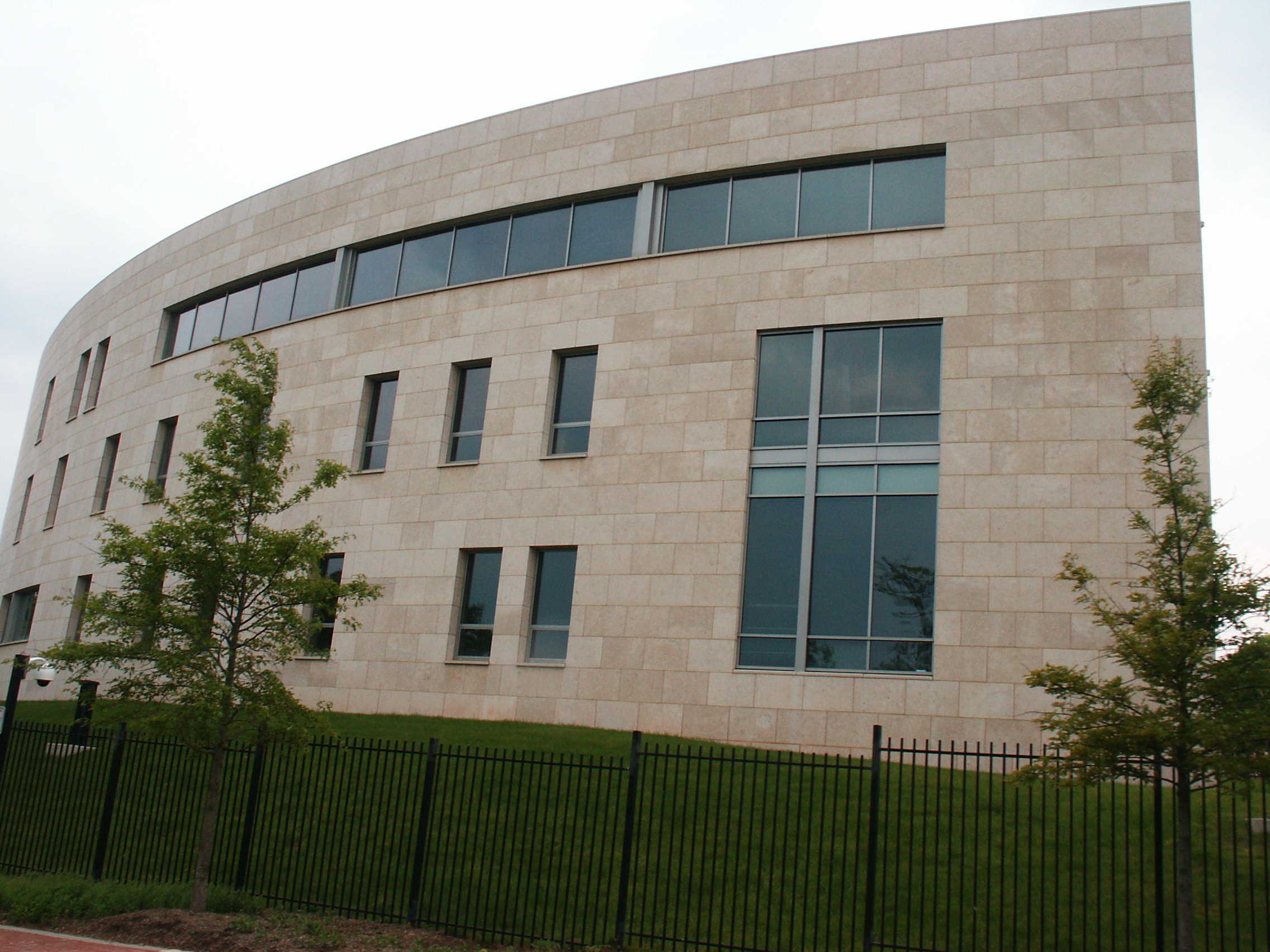

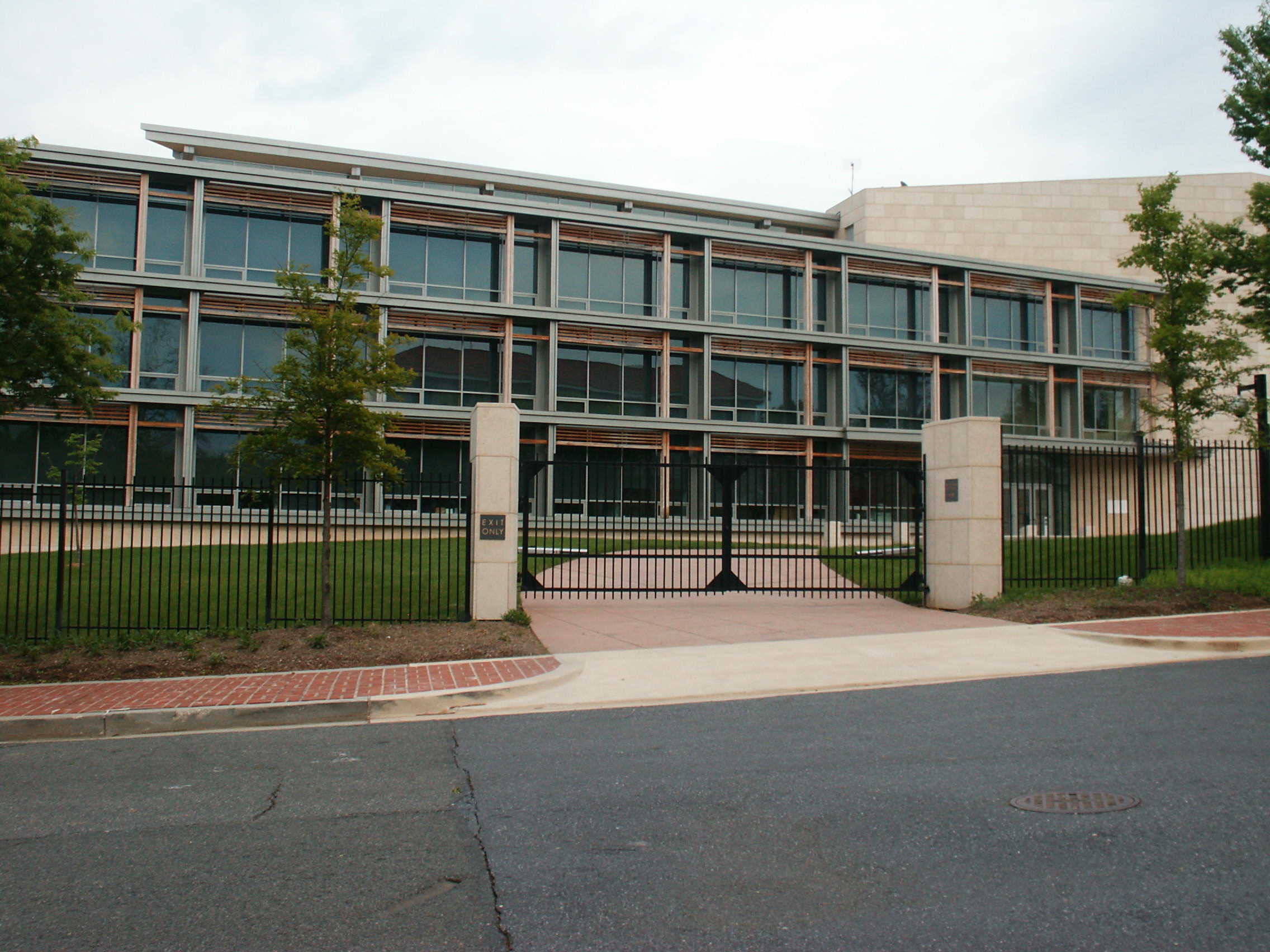

== Events ==
In 2011, there was a protest there about Biafra.
