= Abuja DSS attack =

2014 terrorist incident in Nigeria

Abuja DSS Attack
- Part of the Boko Haram insurgency
- Location: Abuja, FCT, Nigeria
- Date: 31 March 2014
- Target: Department of State Security, Abuja
- Attack type: Prison escape
- Deaths: 21
- Injuries: 2
- Perpetrator: Boko Haram
- No. of participants: Unknown
- Defender: 0

The Abuja DSS attack was a coordinated terrorist attack by the Islamic group Boko Haram on the Department of State Security, Abuja on 31 March 2014 in a bid to escape from detention. This resulted in the death of 21 insurgents who attempted to escape leaving 2 security personnel severely injured.

== Incident ==
The incident occurred on Sunday 31 March 2014 in the morning, when one of the service suspect handler went to the detention to serve their breakfast. In a bid to return to his office, he was disarmed by one of the insurgents who hit him on the head with his handcuff in an attempt to escape. This incessant action drew the attention of the armed guards who shot in the air to stop them. This effort was futile until the Special Threats Assault and Tactics Team (STATT) of the DSS came in to suppress the uprising. Twenty-one prisoners were killed by the personnel and two government officials were seriously injured.

== Reactions ==
After the attack, there was a controversy over the death of the 21 prisoners who died in the process of the attack, because some innocent prisoners might have been killed by the soldiers who labeled them as Boko haram. This assumption was based on the New York Times publications of the Amnesty International report that alleges malicious killing of about 600 unarmed, rearrested escapees who had been earlier freed when Boko haram attacked the Giwa military barracks in Maiduguri. The Amnesty International report was based on an eye-witness account of the Nigerian soldiers' killing of the innocent rearrested prisoners that was freed by Boko haram during the Giwa military barracks attack. The eye-witness said: "The former detainees were in a classroom. They started screaming 'we are not Boko Haram. We are detainees!’ My neighbours and I saw the soldiers take the men to a place called 'no man's land,’ behind the University of Maiduguri. We watched as the soldiers opened fire killing all 56. They were killed in front of us. All of them", according to the New York Times.

== See also ==
- List of prison breaks in Nigeria
- Nigeria prison break
