= Wuse bombing =

Terrorism in Nigeria

- Part of the Boko Haram insurgency
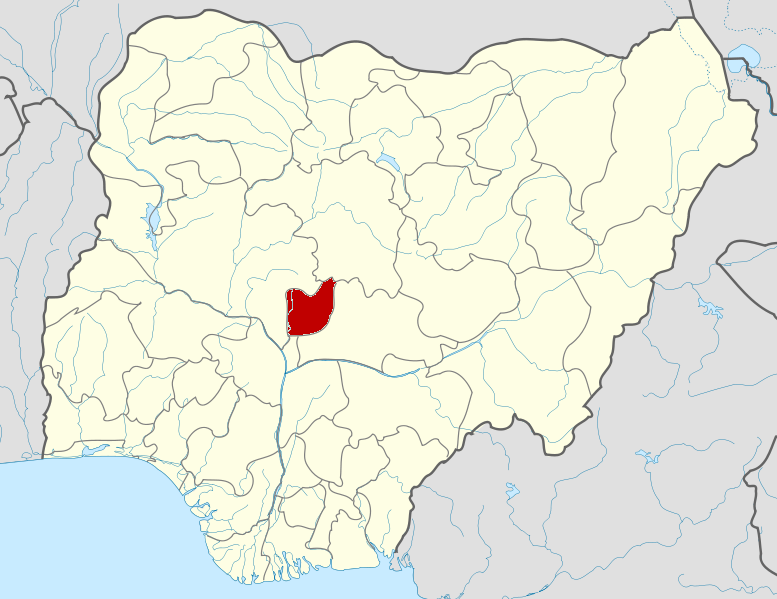
- Location: Abuja, Federal Capital Territory
- Date: 25 June 2014
- Target: Emab plaza
- Attack type: Bombing
- Deaths: 21
- Injuries: 17
- Perpetrator: Boko Haram

The Wuse bombing was a terrorist attack on the Emab plaza in Wuse, a district of Abuja, the Federal Capital Territory (FCT) of Nigeria.

== Incident ==
The incident was reported to have occurred on 25 June 2014. The attack was launched by members of Boko Haram, an Islamic sect in northeastern Nigeria. Explosives were used in the attack, leaving 21 people dead and 17 seriously injured. The twin car bombing incident was said to have occurred around 4pm at a shopping mall. According to the police report, about 40 vehicles were destroyed by this incident.

== See also ==
- Lake Chad attack
