= Uzoma Emenike =

Nigerian diplomat

Nigerian Ambassador to United States
- Incumbent
- Assumed office January 2021

Nigerian Ambassador to Ireland
- In office 2017 – January 2021

Personal details
- Born: Abia State, Nigeria

Uzoma Ikechi Emenike // (born in Abia State, Nigeria) is a Nigerian politician, writer and diplomat. She serves as the current Nigerian Ambassador to the United States of America since appointment and official designation in 2021. She is the first female Nigerian Ambassador to United States since a diplomatic relationship was established between both countries.

== Education ==
Emenike attended University of Maiduguri where she studied sociology and anthropology then later graduated with a BSc in sociology and anthropology. Subsequently, she also attended University of Reading where she obtained a law degree in the UK. After her bachelor's degree she furthered her education and read international law and diplomacy at the University of Lagos where she graduated with a master's degree in the same field. She also obtained a master's degree in International Management from University of Reading.

Emenike also has a doctorate degree from the University of Reading.

Her secondary education was at Holy Rosary Secondary School Umuahia in Abia State (1981 to 1985). She retains strong links with not only the School but also the Old Girls Association (Holy Rosary Secondary School Old Girls Association - OGA Worldwide www.horosco.org) She takes a keen and active interest in the OGA's current Legacy Project Campaign to support quality education for girls.

== Career ==
Uzoma Emenike started her career in foreign affairs in 1992 working with the Nigerian Ministry of Foreign Affairs. She worked in the Protocol and Africa Department in the foreign ministry. In 1992, she was transferred to the Nigerian Embassy in Abidjan, Ivory Coast where she served for six years. In 1998, after her return from Ivory Coast she was designated to different departments in the Ministry of Foreign Affairs where she represented Nigeria in bilateral and multilateral missions abroad.

In 2002, Emenike left the Foreign service for the private sector and started working as a management consultant. In 2016, President Buhari submitted her name to the senate for confirmation and screening as non-career ambassador. On 30 August 2017 she arrived in Ireland to resume duty as Nigerian Ambassador to Ireland following her confirmation from the Senate of Nigeria. She was the Nigerian Ambassador to Ireland until her reassignment as Nigerian Ambassador to United States in 2021.

== Books ==
- Africa: The Centre-piece of Nigeria's Foreign Policy
