= 2011 Abuja United Nations bombing =

Casualties of the 2011 Abuja United Nations' bombing

Coordinates: 9.0500°N 7.5000°E

- Part of the Boko Haram insurgency
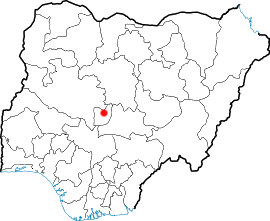
- Location: Abuja, FCT, Nigeria
- Date: 26 August 2011; 11:00 WAT (UTC+01:00)
- Target: United Nations compound
- Attack type: Suicide bombing
- Deaths: 21
- Injuries: 73

A car bomb exploded on 26 August 2011 in the Nigerian capital Abuja's UN building, killing at least 21 and wounding 60. A spokesperson from the Sunni Islamist group Boko Haram later claimed responsibility.

At about 11:00 WAT in the diplomatic zone in the centre of the city the car bomb vehicle broke through two security barriers. Then its driver detonated the bomb after crashing it into the UN reception area. The bomb caused devastation to the building's lower floors. The building is said to be the headquarters for about 400 UN employees but it is not clear how many were inside the building at the time of the attack.

A wing of the building collapsed and the ground floor of the building was badly damaged. Emergency services were quickly on the scene removing dead bodies from the building and rushing the wounded to hospital. Cranes were brought to the blast site to move the mass of rubble and ensure that no-one is trapped there.

The blast killed at least 21 people and injured 73. The Minister of State for Foreign Affairs, Viola Onwuliri, said: "This is not an attack on Nigeria but on the global community. An attack on the world." UN Secretary-General Ban Ki-moon described the attack as an 'assault on those who devote themselves to helping others' The attack was the first suicide bombing in Nigeria to attack an international organisation.

In September 2011 the Nigerian Department of State Security alleged that Mamman Nur was the mastermind behind the attack and offered a ₦26 million (US$160,000) bounty. Also four men appeared in an Abuja magistrates' court charged with organising the bombing, and were remanded in custody to a federal high court hearing.

== See also ==
- October 2010 Abuja bombings
- December 2010 Abuja bombing
- 2011 Abuja police headquarters bombing
