= December 2010 Abuja bombing =

Terrorism in Nigeria

2010 Abuja bombing
- Location: 9.002°N 7.449°E; Abuja, Nigeria
- Date: 31 December 2010
- Attack type: Bombing
- Weapon: bomb
- Deaths: 4
- Injuries: 26
- Perpetrator: Boko Haram

The December 2010 Abuja bombing was a bomb attack on a barracks on the outskirts of Abuja, Nigeria, on 31 December 2010. Four people were killed, including a pregnant woman, and 26 were injured; according to defence minister Adetokunbo Kayode, all of the dead were civilians, as were most of the injured. The attack was the second in Abuja in three months, and was the first near a barracks in the country since its return to democracy in 1999.
