= 2011 Abuja police headquarters bombing =

Terrorist incident in Nigeria

- Location: 9.028203°N 7.498046°E; Abuja, FCT, Nigeria
- Date: 16 June 2011
- Target: Hafiz Ringim
- Attack type: Suicide car bombing
- Weapon: Car bomb
- Deaths: 2 to 6 (including the perpetrator)
- Perpetrator: Boko Haram

The first suicide bombing in Nigeria's history occurred on 16 June 2011, when a suicide bomber drove a car bomb onto the premises of the Louis Edet House in Abuja, the headquarters of the Nigeria Police Force. He may have been trying to kill Inspector-General of Police Hafiz Ringim, whose convoy he followed into the compound, but he was stopped by security before he could do so.

It was confirmed that the bomber and a traffic policeman were killed, although authorities said there may have been up to six casualties.

The Sunni Islamist group Boko Haram claimed the explosion.

== See also ==
- 2011 Abuja United Nations bombing
