= Rebuild Lagos Trust Fund =

Not-for-profit organisation

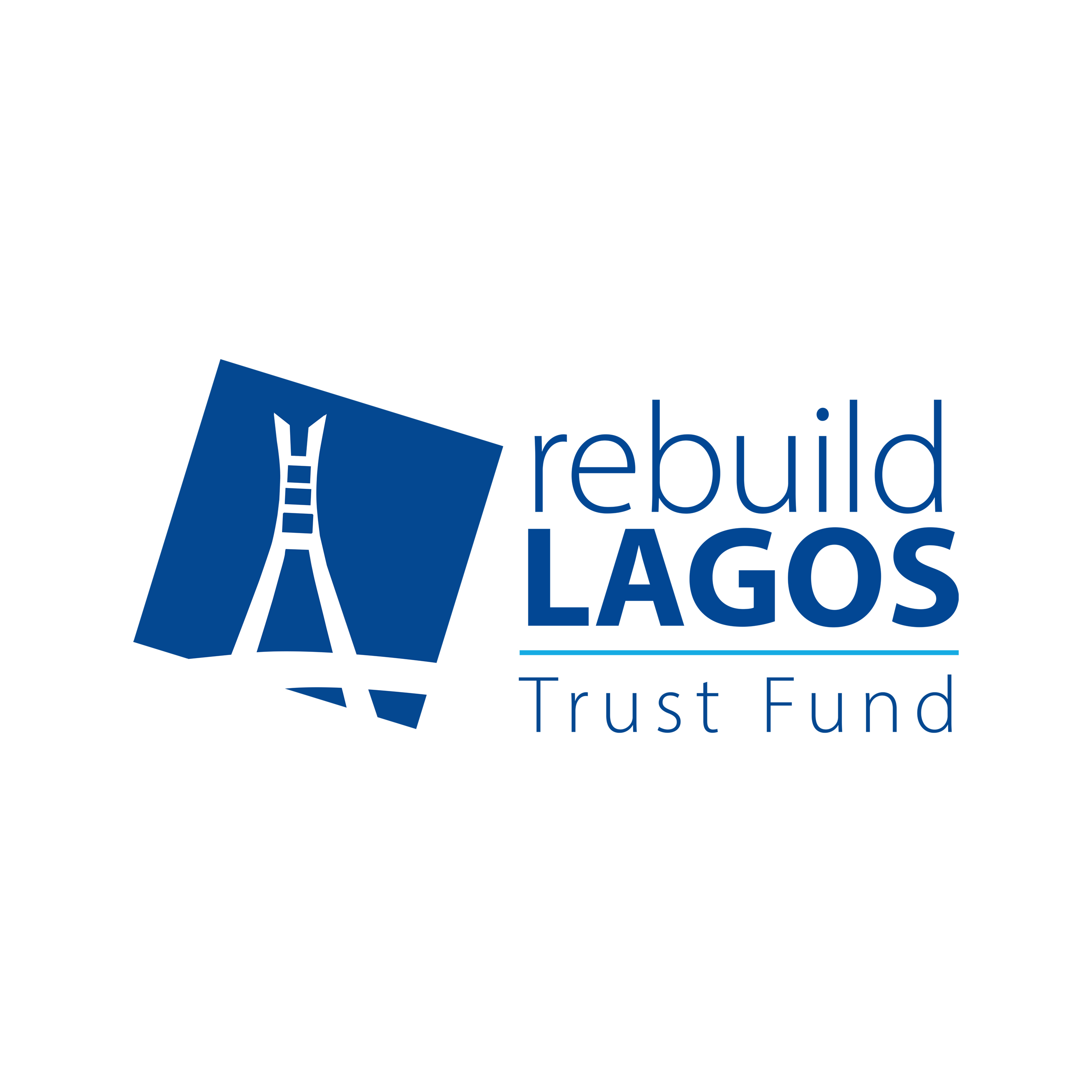
Rebuild Lagos Trust Fund official logo

Rebuild Lagos Trust Fund (also referred to as RLTF or The Fund) is a not-for-profit public-private partnership incorporated on 26 April 2021 as a company limited by guarantee tasked to rebuild, restore or preserve Lagos State public facilities marred by degradation, vandalization and damage through natural or human causes. At initiation, the organization was assigned a portfolio of six public assets (historical and contemporary) at different stages of defacement or degeneration. The structural integrity of the historical buildings however, were either adversely or mildly affected. The six pioneer projects of RLTF were, Iga idunganran Primary Healthcare Centre (PHC); High Court, Igbosere; City Hall Lagos; Fire Service Station, Ikotun Igodun; Lagos State DNA & Forensic Center and Oyingbo Bus Terminal.

== Timeline ==
=== 2020 ===
In the aftermath of the #EndSARS protest in Lagos State resulting in the destruction of public infrastructure and business losses for private entities, the then governor of Lagos State, signed an executive order establishing the Lagos State Rebuilding Trust Fund Committee on 4 November 2020. . While there are no clear data available to measure the extent of damage done to public and private assets nor the financial implications - the government of Lagos State at the time, claimed the decision to establish the committee was in good faith as part of the critical initiatives identified to repair the fault lines of trust between the citizens and government of Lagos state, especially among vulnerable groups not the least the elderly and people living with disabilities.

Faced with culling the huge amount of funds required to rehabilitate, reconstruct or preserve damaged public assets, the governor, Babajide Sanwo-Olu inaugurated an eight-member Board of Trustees. They are Yemi Cardoso (board chairman), Bola Adesola, Olujimi Hotonu (who currently serves as the Fund's chief executive officer), Olugbenga Agboola, Sam Egube, Konyin Ajayi, Mohammed Yahaya and Abubakar Suleiman.

=== 2021 ===
The Rebuilding Trust Fund Committee's principal mandate was scoped to phased and multisector infrastructure project plans coupled with fostering engagement built on faith in and long-term support from the public. Hence, the governance and organizational structures of The Fund required a change With autonomy, transparency, accountability and integrity serving as the guard rails of project planning and implementation. To fulfil its mandate, grow partnerships and collaborations, assure continuity, mitigate project risks and ensure sustainability of its programs and initiatives.

More so, to explore and access funding through partnerships, institutions and other legitimate channels beyond the take-off grant from the government of Lagos State, the decision was reached to register and incorporate The Fund as "Rebuild Lagos Trust Fund LTD/GTE" on 26 April 2021. A non-profit organization to advise the state government on the most critical assets to prioritize for rehabilitation, reconstruction or renovation; and to design and implement global standard operating and funding model for its operations. RLTF was also charged with the responsibilities of developing and implementing a prioritization framework to guide all rebuilding effort to deliver positive and maximum social, environmental and economic benefits for the people of Lagos State; and making the detail costs and progress of the rebuilding of destroyed assets available to the public.

== Projects ==
=== Iga Idungaran Primary Healthcare Centre ===
In November 2021, Rebuild Lagos Trust fund announced the community-level upgrade project - Iga Idungaran Primary Healthcare Centre (PHC) as its pioneer project. Originally built by Zenith Bank in 2011 on Adeniji Adele Road, situated in Ward B1 axis housed within the Lagos Island central local government area - the PHC is a government-run healthcare facility that serves the Iga Idungaran community and neighbouring Wards B2, C1, C2 and C3 . The locality dates back to the 15th century with a rich history and tourist attraction of several ancient and modern sites including the official residence of the Oba of Lagos.

The community health center was prior to its rehabilitation a failing entity lacking health-integrated services in the wake of the October 2020 unrest. Of its six projects, RLTF took up the PHC first because community residents were placed at a grave disadvantage in terms of accessible healthcare that is available 24/7.

Before the commencement of upgrades to the facility, on 12 October 2021, the RLTF Medical Advisory Committee (MAC) met with the Medical Officer of Health to first address the challenges posed to the staff, patient flow matrix and mitigating security gaps at Iga Idunganran PHC before its vandalization for proper dimensioning of project requirements. After an impact assessment by The Fund's MAC and interactions with the end-users in the community and stakeholders, a case was made to recommission the facility with total land area of 1,075.29sqm serving the growing population in the Lagos Island community and an average of 45,000 non-community residents per year and 123 persons per day.

Project implementation period was capped at 42 weeks, and renovations kicked off on 10 February 2022 after MAC consultations and the approval of the board of the Rebuild Lagos Trust Fund. By June 2022, Civil and MEP works were 100% complete. However, significant progress was recorded on the project through funding interventions and donations from Lagos State government and Zenith Bank Plc. A development that facilitated tier III medical upgrades of the health facility with optimized process flow. Some of the major upgrades to the PHC include. - the introduction of a standard ENT Clinic, Dental Clinic and Eye Clinic; a fully equipped medical laboratory; air-conditioned and additional bed spaces in the lying-in room; first stage labour/delivery room; extended female & male wards; automated water treatment plant for the entire facility and a buster pump; a scan room; technologically advanced washrooms; telemedicine/conference room for training; internet connectivity; networking infrastructure, alarm systems, security access controls/server room and 24/7 CCTV surveillance To alleviate the healthcare challenges of especially the vulnerable and disadvantaged in the Iga Idungaran community, the PHC resumed operations in March 2023 ahead of the official ceremony to commemorate project completion which occurred near the health facility grounds on 26 May 2023.

=== High Court of Lagos State, Igbosere ===
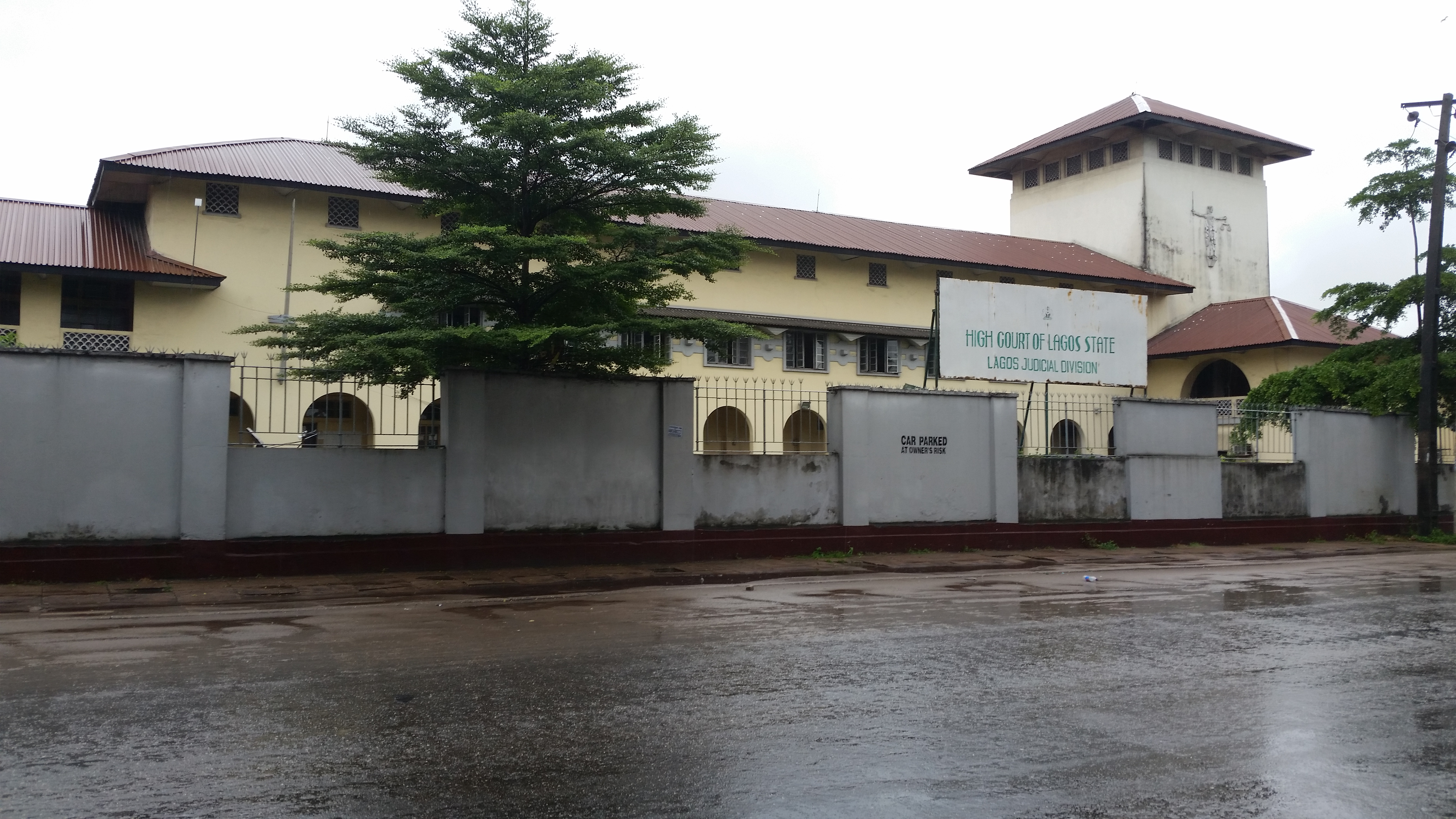
High Court of Lagos State, Igbosere building before the fire incident of October 2020.

The High Court of Lagos State, is the oldest colonial-era judicial building in Nigeria. It was one of the major historical buildings impacted by severe damages during the End Sars protests of 2020. The trauma to the colonial building is largely due to fire which razed an extensive area of the court and affected the structural integrity of its buildings. The High Court of Lagos State covers a total area of 18,545.44m² - located in Igbosere, a district in the Lagos Island local government area with the coordinates N 6° 26' 58.5492", E 3° 24' 10.7136. Prior to The Fund's restorative and reconstruction works, the court relocated to Osborne Foreshore Phase 2, Ikoyi and operates out of other locations across the state as a temporary measure. In February 2022, Rebuild Lagos Trust Fund announced the commencing of reconstruction of the High Court of Lagos State, Igbosere. with a project lifecycle of 72 weeks. The preservation of the court's legacies and traditions began with restorative work and storage of the court's artifacts, exterior wall structures and external fixtures for reuse. With a completed contract awarding exercise and mobilization of contractors in October 2022, the old colonial structure was demolished. In December 2022, The Fund announced at a groundbreaking ceremony that the High Court, Igbosere project will be executed in two phases. Phase one will be the restoration of the colonial building to maintain the exterior with major interior redesign and reconstruction. The phase two will be the development of a multi-story edifice with features and facilities of a modern court complex. To resolve the space constraints of the old court's overstretched building; address case delays and multiple adjournments, and to facilitate improvement in the performance of the justice system through digital technology enabled court administration.

RLTF, in May 2023 on an official site tour of the court's project site gave updates on the extent of the redevelopment exercise. Announcing the basement level and foundation works as part of the restoration of the old colonial building (Phase 1), at 75%.completion. Also announced was the demolition works on the old Babalakin building behind the old colonial structure before the piling works scheduled for the phase two construction of the new court multi-storey structure.
