= Killing of Pelumi Onifade =

Nigerian reporter killed during #EndSARS Protests

Pelumi Emmanuel Onifade (born 2000) was a Nigerian reporter who was extrajudicially killed in Lagos in October 2020 while covering the #EndSARS Protests. While on assignment, he was arrested. His body was found at a morgue several days later and has not been returned to his family. The circumstances of his death remain unclear. The Committee to Protect Journalists has called for Nigerian authorities to investigate the circumstances of his death.

== Background ==
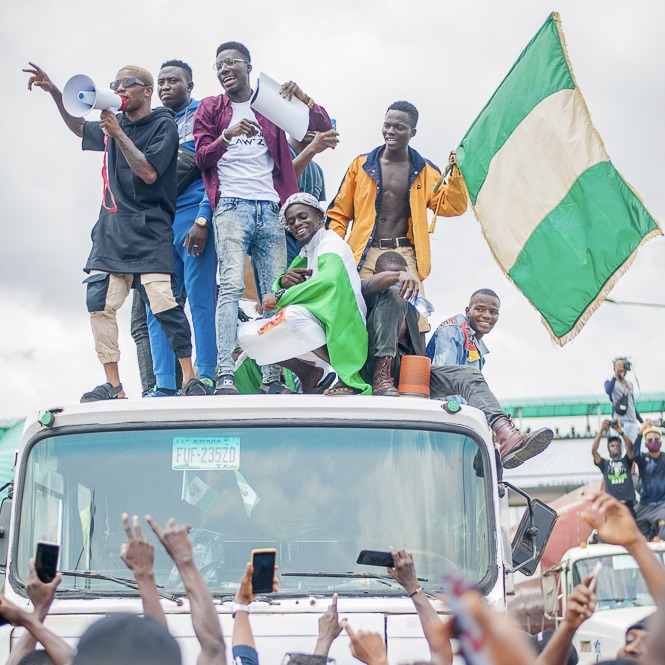
Protesters at the #EndSARS protest in Lagos, Nigeria in 2020.

At the time of his death, Onifade was a sophomore student of history at Tai Solarin University of Education. He was interning as a reporter with Gboah TV, a Lagos-based online news channel.

On 24 October 2020, Onifade travelled to Abule Egba in Lagos State to cover the #ENDSARS protest for Gboah TV. While on assignment, he filmed a report reportedly showing the President of the Yoruba Youth Forum, Olusegun Abiodun Bolarinwa, shooting into a crowd of protesters. From there, he had gone to cover an attempted break-in at a government facility in Agege. He was later arrested.

Onifade was last seen alive later that day in police custody at Ikeja. It was at this point that he was reportedly hit by a bullet and carried away in a police van. His body was found six days later at a mortuary in Ikorodu, Lagos. The circumstances that led to Onifade's death were kept away from his family and from the public, and his body was not released to his family for burial.

The injustice of Onifade's death sparked sustained calls for investigation and justice advanced by media rights organisations such as the Committee to Protect Journalists, the International Press Institute, the Media Foundation for West Africa and the Media Rights Agenda.

On October 17, 2024, four years after his death, a coroner's inquest was commenced at a Nigerian Federal High Court in Lagos on the orders of the court to determine the actual cause of Onifade's death. After almost 6 years passed since he was murdered, the investigating magistrate overseeing the coroner’s inquiry disclosed on June 25, 2026 that she had received the autopsy report confirming that an unidentified human body deposited at the mortuary of Ikorodu General Hospital was indeed that of the slain young reporter. This came after the court on June 5, 2026 ordered the Lagos State University Teaching Hospital and the Lagos State DNA and Forensic Centre to submit its forensic reports on the unidentified cadaver tagged No. 1385 within 21 days.

== See also ==
- Disappearance of Azory Gwanda
