= 2020 Lekki shooting =

Massacre in Nigeria

2020 Lekki Massacre (shooting)
- Part of End SARS
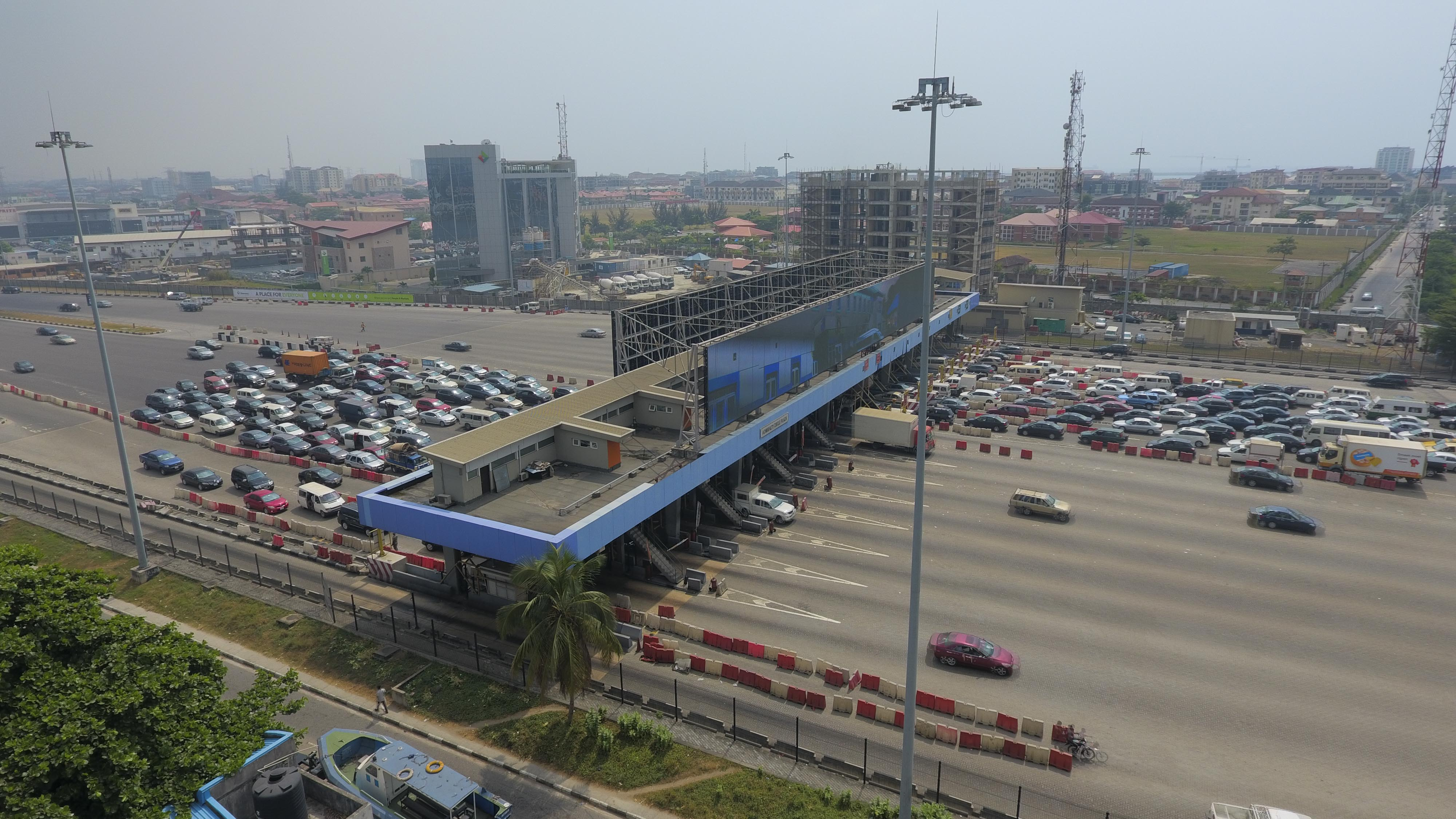
- The Lekki toll gate, protesters were concentrated on the road in front of the gate pictured
- Location: 06°26′10″N 03°26′51″E; Lekki, Lagos State, Nigeria
- Date: 20 October 2020; 12 : 00 p.m.
- Target: Civilians (End SARS protesters)
- Attack type: shooting
- Deaths: At least 12
- Injuries: Unknown
- Perpetrator: Nigerian Army

On the night of 20 October 2020, at about 6:50 p.m., members of the Nigerian Army opened fire on unarmed End SARS protesters at the Lekki toll gate (Admiralty Circle Plaza) in Lagos State, Nigeria. Amnesty International stated that at least 12 protesters were killed during the shooting. A day after the incident, on 21 October, the governor of Lagos State, Babajide Sanwo-olu, denied reports of any loss of lives, but later admitted in an interview with a CNN journalist that "only two persons were killed".

The Nigerian Army initially denied involvement in the shooting, but later stated that it had deployed soldiers to the toll gate on the orders of the governor of Lagos State. A month after the shooting, following a CNN documentary on the shooting, the Nigerian Army admitted to the Lagos Judiciary panel of inquiry into the shooting that it had deployed its personnel to the toll gate with both live and blank bullets.

== Background ==
=== Previous Nigerian Army crackdowns ===
The Nigerian Army has been known to open fire and kill unarmed civilians in previous incidents, most notably was the 2015 Zaria massacre and 2018 attack on Shiite Muslims who were protesting against the jailing of a cleric in which 45 Nigerians were killed. Three sons of Sheikh El-Zakzaky were killed alongside about 30 other followers of the Sheikh on July 25, 2014. Since the country's return to civilian rule in 1999, soldiers have killed unarmed civilians in several incidents including: Odi, Zaki Biam, Baga, Zaria, and Abonema. The incident at the Lekki tollgate on October 20, 2020, however runs contrary to the above examples as the testimonies documented in the leaked report of the Judicial panel of inquiry and the subsequent white paper released by the Lagos State government's committee to review the aforementioned report do not support the narrative that a massacre indeed occurred at the Lekki tollgate. Although the panel members relied almost exclusively on testimony provided by an alleged eyewitness to arrive at a conclusion, the expert testimonies by the pathologist and two forensic teams engaged by the panel and the Lagos State government did not however support the summary of the 309-page report.

=== End SARS ===
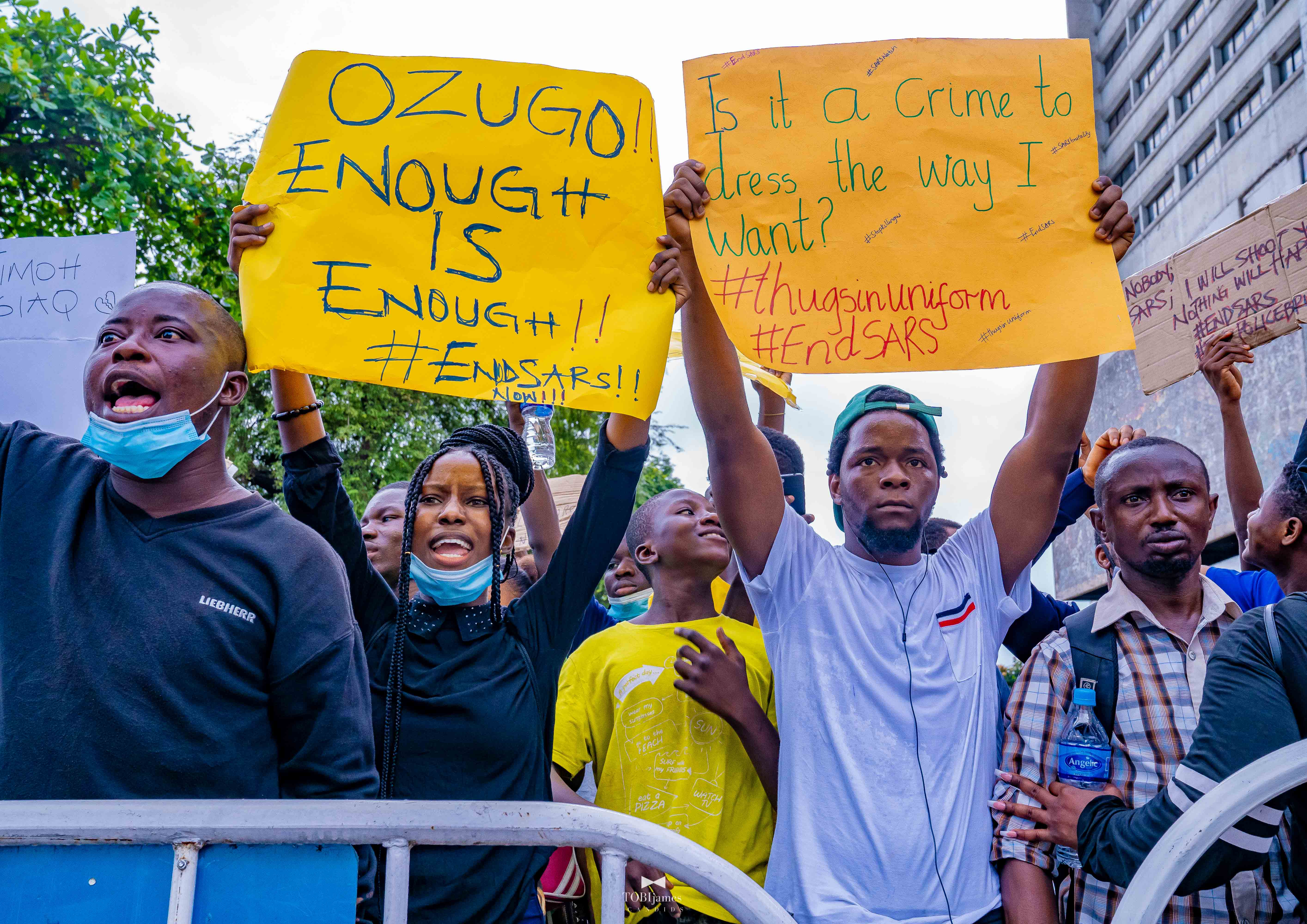
Protesters hold up their placards in front of the Lagos State House

End SARS is a decentralised social movement and series of mass protests against police brutality in Nigeria. The slogan calls for the disbanding of the Special Anti-Robbery Squad (SARS).

In 2016, a human rights activist, Segun Awosanya popularly known as Segalink started EndSARS campaign on social media prompting police authority to announce reform of the police unit but nothing was achieved at the time. In 2018, Nigerian rapper Michael Ugochukwu Stephens, known by his stage name Ruggedman, joined the campaign to end police brutality releasing a single titled, "Is Police Your Friend?"

The protests became more popular in 2017 on Twitter using the hashtag #EndSARS to demand the Nigerian government disband and reform the police unit.

Within a few days of renewed protests, some claimed victory when, on Sunday, 11 October 2020, the Nigerian Police Force announced it would be dissolving SARS. However, many noted similar promises had been made in recent years, and that the government planned to reassign and review SARS officers to medical centers rather than remove them entirely. The Lekki toll gate shooting promptly ended the protest movement.

== Attack ==
On the night of 20 October 2020, Nigerian Armed Forces shot at unarmed protesters at the Lekki toll gate (officially Admiralty Circle Plaza) in Lagos, Nigeria.

According to Amnesty International, shortly before the shooting, CCTV cameras were allegedly removed from the toll gate. The Lagos State Government subsequently said these were laser cameras and not CCTV cameras as earlier publicized on social media. Also, the electricity supplying lights to the toll gate was cut and the advertisement billboards, which are owned and maintained by Loatsad Media, were turned off. Loatsad Media stated, "On Tuesday [20 October] when the curfew was announced we heeded the governor's warnings and didn't want our staff in any danger, hence by 3 pm, our staff had been ordered to leave the site and the board was switched off based on the governor's curfew request." MTN and Airtel experienced outages during the protests. MTN Nigeria apologized later that night for the loss of coverage at the time of the shooting. On 21 October, the Association of Licensed Telecommunications Operators of Nigeria (ALTON), released a statement explaining that network downtime experienced during the massacre was a result of damages to fiber cables across major routes in the city resulting in congestion and poor network services. Following a message spread on social media that protesters would be safe if they sang the national anthem and waved the Nigerian flag. Protesters sat down with locked arms singing the Nigerian anthem and waving the Nigerian flag in respite. Twenty armed military personnel approached and from video of the event shows them raising their voices in song as they are shot at by the armed soldiers.

A popular Nigerian DJ, DJ Switch, live-streamed the event on Instagram during and in the aftermath of the shooting. In the video, they attempted to remove a bullet from the leg of a man who was shot, tying a Nigerian flag around his leg. Though many other eyewitness videos and footages surfaced in the aftermath of the shooting, the livestream would prove to be decisive evidence of the shooting. In a video made on 23 October, she clarified that she witnessed the shooting of seven people at the time she was live-streaming on Instagram. She said that armed soldiers and police officers shot at her and other peaceful #EndSARS protesters at the Lekki toll gate on the night of 20 October and that among them were officers of the disbanded SARS unit. She also said that the number of the dead increased to fifteen, but that she did not get a chance to record further, as her phone battery had died. She further said at least 15 people were killed in the shootings and that she and other survivors took the victims' bodies to the soldiers who took them away. She has since left the country for Canada following threats to her life.

Lagos-based risk advisory, SBM Intelligence estimated, based on witnesses and emergency services, that at least forty-six people were killed around Nigeria on Tuesday, 20 October according. In the hours after the shooting, People's Gazette, a local newspaper, reported that the army had tried to give nine bodies to the police to help them bury. The police rejected the bodies.

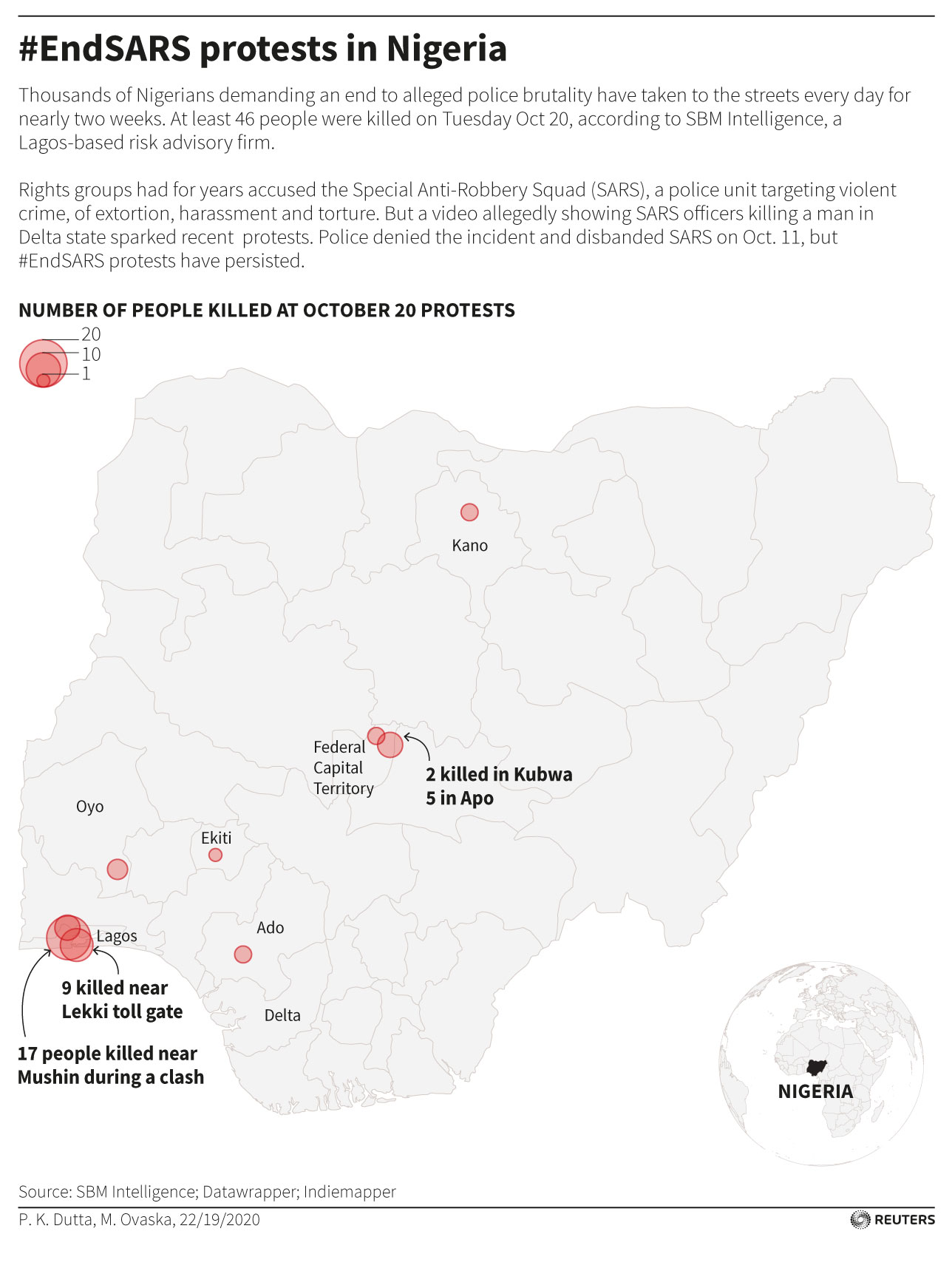
Reuters graphic of deaths in Nigeria on October 20, 2020.

In an independent analysis of the attack, The Wall Street Journal investigated various clips from social media and concluded that indeed the massacre took place in Lekki. A detailed report by Nigerian newspaper, Premium Times, established the events that led to the massacre, an attempted cover-up, and abandonment of victims by the Lagos State Government.

== Casualties ==
In a report on 21 October, Amnesty International stated that at least 12 protesters were killed in what the organization described as "extrajudicial executions". A former marketer with Etisalat Telecommunications Company (now 9Mobile) was reported to be one of the casualties. Denying this, Lagos State Governor, Babajide Sanwo-Olu, claimed that no one was killed at Lekki and later posted on Twitter that one person died at the hospital as a result of blunt force trauma to the head, and that the connection to the protest was under investigation. The Nigerian military denied responsibility for the shooting, tweeting that media reports were "fake news".

According to witnesses, the military did not allow ambulances to provide aid and removed corpses from the scene of the shooting.

In testimony during April and May 2021 before the Lagos State Judicial Panel, a witness stated that by her reckoning based in part on video evidence at least 10 people died in the shooting. According to Premium Times reporting, they could count five bodies from the videos with many additional injuries.

On 23 July 2023, Lagos State Governor Babajide Sanwo-Olu approved of the mass burial of 103 protesters who lost their lives during the EndSars incident.

== Aftermath ==
On the day of the shooting, on 20 October 2020, the government imposed a city-wide round-the-clock curfew in Lagos which was to start at 4 p.m. which had only been announced earlier that day around 1 p.m. via social media. Protesters defied the curfew although it was later extended till 9 p.m. by the Lagos State Governor, staging several demonstrations, and gunfire could be heard throughout the city. Several fires burned throughout Lagos after the shooting. A few hours after the massacre, the Lagos State Governor visited the injured victims in hospitals in Lagos. In a statement on Twitter, he attributed the massacre to "forces beyond our direct control."

The following days after the Lekki massacre witnessed a lot of violence by hoodlums not associated with the #EndSars protest. The looting of shops, burning and destruction of properties of private individuals and government in some parts of Lagos began late in the night of the massacre and spilled into the following morning until military personnel were deployed to the streets of Lagos to restore calm and order.

== Reactions ==
In a statement made on 22 October 2020, the President of Nigeria Muhammadu Buhari called for calm and said he would promote police reforms; however, he did not issue a statement or acknowledge the massacre at the Lekki toll gate.

U.S. presidential candidate Joe Biden called on the Nigerian government to cease the "violent crackdown on protesters". Former U.S. Secretary of State Hillary Clinton tweeted that Nigerian authorities should "stop killing young #EndSARS protesters".

United Nations High Commissioner for Human Rights Michelle Bachelet stated that "There is little doubt that this was a case of excessive use of force, resulting in unlawful killings with live ammunition, by Nigerian armed forces". U.N. Secretary-General António Guterres said that Nigerians' right "to protest peacefully needs to be guaranteed" and that "police brutality needs to stop, and those responsible for acts of such dramatic violence are made accountable".

The violence was strongly condemned by the chairman of the African Union Commission. UK Foreign Secretary Dominic Raab expressed deep concern and alarm at the reports of civilian deaths, calling for an end to the violence.

Nigerian international footballer Odion Ighalo said he was ashamed of the Nigerian government. Members of Nigeria women's national football team, including Ngozi Okobi-Okeoghene, condemned the massacre.

In solidarity and to pay his respect to the "fallen heroes", Nigerian musician Burna Boy released a song titled 20:10:20, marking the day of the Lekki massacre.

On 21 November 2020, 34 days after the incident, the Nigerian Army admitted after weeks of denial that its servicemen deployed in military vehicles. It also said the soldiers were given live and blank rounds of ammunition, but stopped short of clarifying who gave the order. This statement comes after weeks of denial by the Nigerian Army that its servicemen were never deployed at the Lekki Toll Gate on the night of the masscre.

At least six protesters were beaten and 13 others were arrested at the bridge site on 13 February 2021.

== Judicial Panel of Inquiry ==
On 26 October, the Lagos State government constituted a Judicial Panel of Inquiry to investigate happenings during the EndSARS protests and to establish who shot protesters, who were affected, how much compensation victims should get, and who should be prosecuted. The eight-member panel is headed by Doris Okuwobi, a retired justice. The members of the panel were Retired Deputy Inspector General of Police Fredrick Taiwo Lakanu a lawyer, Mr. Ebun-Olu Adegboruwa SAN and Ms. Patience Patrick Udoh both practicing lawyers in Lagos were appointed as representatives of Civil Society. Segun Awosanya (Segalink) one of the initiators of the EndSARS campaign was appointed to the panel representing human rights activists. Mr. Lucas Koyejo was appointed as the representative of the National Human Rights Commission and Mrs. Toyin Odunsanya, now a Judge of the High Court of Lagos, was appointed by Lagos State Government from the Directorate of Citizens Right, Lagos State Ministry of Justice Rinu Oduala and Majekodunmi Temitope are representatives of the youth.

Following a call for submission of petitions against police brutality by the panel, several victims sent in damning reports of torture, killings, and other human rights abuses by the police.

During a visit to the scene of the Lekki Toll Gate massacre, the panel found spent bullet shells. The panel was denied access to a military hospital suspected of holding bodies of the victims for over 30 minutes but when the panel eventually gained access into the facility it was found purportedly under renovation and empty.

On 30 November 2020, The Nigerian Army admitted that its soldiers were armed with live ammunition when they opened fire on protesters at the demonstration in Lagos. Brigadier Ahmed Taiwo, Commander of the 81 Military Intelligence Brigade while giving a testimony to the Judicial Panel equally alleged that The Nigerian Army was called upon to intervene by the Governor of Lagos State, Babajide Sanwo-Olu. Taiwo added that Sanwo-Olu called the Chief of Army Staff and the General Officer Commanding (GOC) 81 Division, claiming that the Police had been "overrun".

The report of the forensic analysis conducted by Sentinel Forensics employed by the panel to examine the evidence submitted by the Nigerian Army, bullet casings discovered by the panel at the scene, and tape of the CCTV at the toll gate showed that the police and the army officers continued firing at protesters even as they were running away. The panel eventually found that nine people were killed.

The Nigerian government rejected the report, with Lai Mohammed attributing media reactions to the shooting as "the triumph of fake news and the intimidation of a silent majority by a vociferous lynch mob".

== CNN documentary ==
On 18 November, a month after the incident, CNN aired a six-minute documentary on the shooting, the independent investigation showed geolocated photographs of victims and eyewitness accounts, as well as the families of victims, alongside verified trended videos of the shooting using timestamps and data from video files. CNN said that Nigerian authorities refused to comment when they were contacted for clarifications. The documentary also revealed that in collaboration with the Balkan Investigative Reporting Network, CNN was able to establish that several of the bullet casings from the Lekki Toll Gate, originated from Serbia from where Nigeria had imported bullets every year between 2005 and 2016. The documentary has given rise to another wave of outrage, this time mostly towards the Nigerian authorities' changing narrative in the face of naked evidence. In its response, the Nigerian Army insists that its members were 'professional in their conduct' and did not breach rules of engagement. Nigeria's Minister of Information, Lai Mohammed, accused CNN of 'irresponsible journalism' and described the documentary of the product of fake news and disinformation.

On 24 November, as part of its investigations into the shooting, CNN obtained and released CCTV footages from government surveillance cameras overlooking the toll gate presented to the Lagos Judiciary panel of inquiry investigating police brutality, the abuses of the disbanded SARS and the toll gate shooting. The CCTV footage and other footages from the scene at the time showed soldiers shooting at protesters from both ends of the Toll Gate. Corroborating a previous testimony given by the Lekki Concession Company to the panel, the footage stopped at about 8 pm because the CCTV had been tampered with, ostensibly to provide cover for the shooting. Though yet to provide any counter evidence, Nigerian authorities continue to deny that soldiers shot at protesters.

== DJ Switch ==
On 9 November 2020, 20 days after the massacre, the disc jockey DJ Switch who gained nationwide fame for her live-stream of the shooting, was granted right of asylum in Canada after multiple threats on her life, with her close friend Salami Eric Adomokhar, reportedly missing. Protests have continued accordingly, as the Nigerian state has maintained a pattern of violent repression, including the killing of demonstrators. Unconfirmed reports say that she narrated her ordeal before the Sub-committee on International Human Rights of the Standing Committee on Foreign Affairs and International Development of the Canadian Parliament.

== 2021 End SARS memorial protest ==
In the aftermath of End SARS protest, End SARS activists announced that there would be a memorial to mark the Lekki Shootings. On 19 October 2021, Mr Macaroni and Falz announced that a protest would be carried out in vehicles, with respect to the message by the Lagos state Police force which prohibited any form of protest. Protests took place mostly in Lagos, Abuja, and Port Harcourt, among others.

== 2024 ECOWAS court ruling ==
On 10 July 2024, the ECOWAS Court of Justice ruled that the Nigerian government was guilty of human rights abuses for their actions during the #EndSARS protest at Lekki tollgate in October 2020. The court found that the government violated several international human rights standards, including the African Charter on Human and Peoples' Rights, and ordered the government to pay ₦10 million in compensation to each victim named in the suit.
