= OpNigeria =

Hackers

- Formation: c. 2016
- Founder: Anonymous
- Type: Virtual community
- Region served: Global
- Members: LiteMods, WhiteRabbitGang, YounesAnonymous, NigeriaOp, LorianSynaro, YourAnonNews, HackDown2

Operation Nigeria or by the abbreviation OpNigeria is a group created by members of Anonymous. The members that took part in the EndSars movement were LiteMods, WhiteRabbitGang, YounesAnonymous, NigeriaOp, LorianSynaro, YourAnonNews and HackDown2. The members include numerous hackers or hacking groups who in 2020 supported the EndSARS movement that is going on in Nigeria. The group has hacked multiple Nigerian government websites and banks as well.
