= End SARS =

Decentralized social movement against police brutality in Nigeria (2020)

- End police brutality Part of Gen Z protests
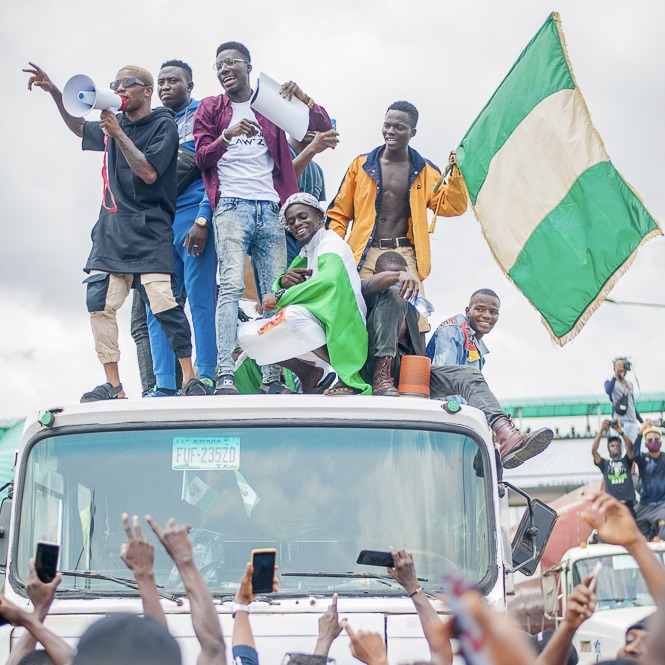
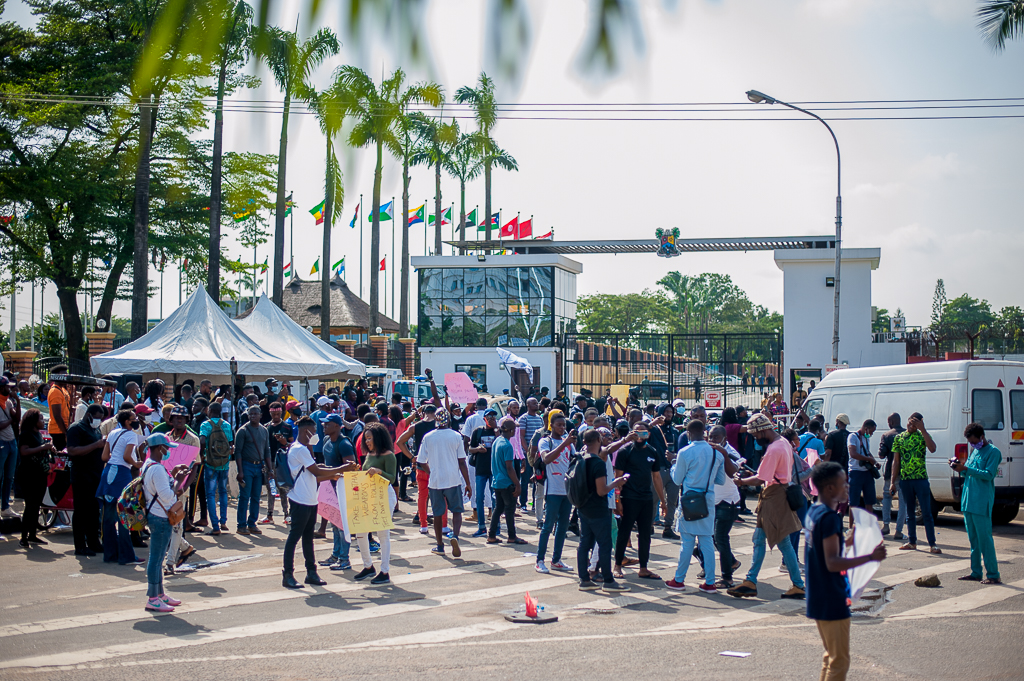
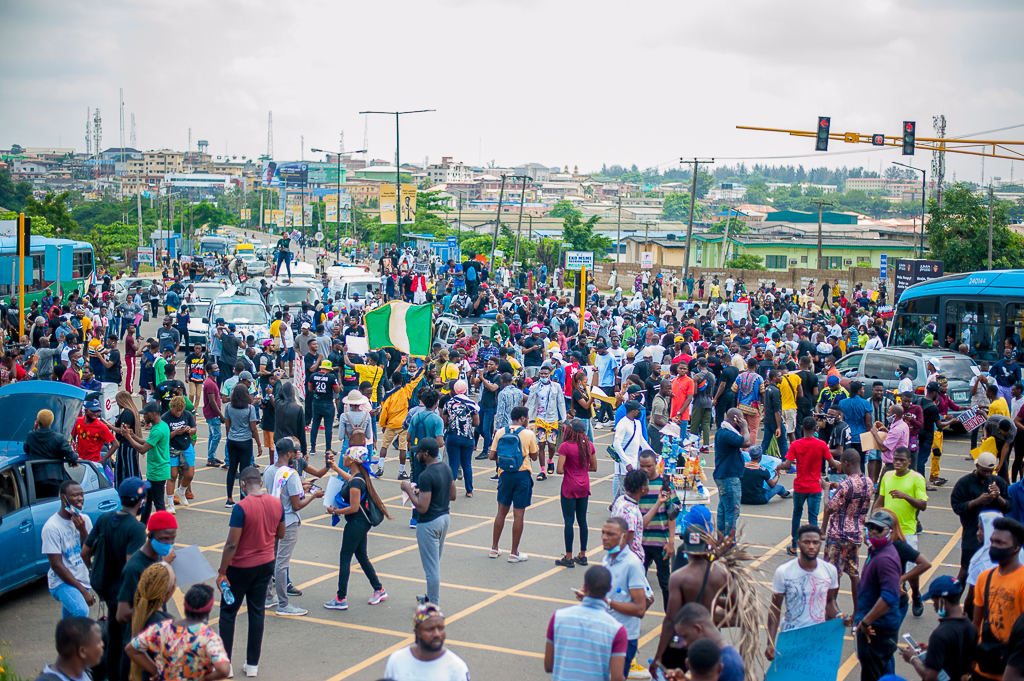
- Date: 3 October 2020 - 20 October 2021
- Location: International, largely in Nigeria
- Caused by: Killings, assaults, and harassment by SARS officials in Nigeria lack of freedom of expression 2020 Lekki shooting
- Methods: Mass mobilization Protest, demonstrations, online activism, civil disobedience, marches
- Status: Concluded: SARS unit dissolved on 11 October 2020; Government response to protests on 20 October 2020 leads to several deaths.

Parties
Protesters (no centralised leadership)	Government of Nigeria; Nigerian Armed Forces; Nigerian Army; Nigerian Police Force; SARS; Pro-government counterprotesters

Casualties
- Deaths: 69 total (51 civilians (including journalist Pelumi Onifade), 11 policemen, 7 soldiers)

End SARS, widely written as EndSARS or #EndSARS, was a decentralised social movement and series of mass protests against police brutality in Nigeria that mainly occurred in October of 2020. The movement's slogan called for the disbandment of the Special Anti-Robbery Squad (SARS), a notorious unit of the Nigerian Police known for its long record of abuse against Nigerian citizens. The protests originated from a Twitter campaign in 2017, using the hashtag #EndSARS to demand the unit's disbandment by the Nigerian government. The movement experienced a resurgence in October 2020 following further revelations of the unit's abuses, leading to mass demonstrations across major cities in Nigeria, and widespread outrage on social media platforms. The hashtag #EndSARS accumulated over 28 million tweets on Twitter alone. Solidarity protests and demonstrations by Nigerians in the diaspora and sympathizers occurred in many major cities around the world. Notably, the movement was predominantly led by young Nigerians and expanded to include demands for good governance and accountability, amidst unprecedented hardship in the country.

Within a few days of protests, on 11 October 2020, the Nigerian Police Force announced the dissolution of the unit with immediate effect. The move was widely perceived as a triumph for the demonstrators. However, it was noted in many quarters that similar announcements had been made in recent years to placate the public without the unit actually being disbanded, and that the government had merely planned to reassign and review SARS officers to medical centres rather than disband the unit entirely. Protests continued accordingly, and the Nigerian government maintained a pattern of violent repression, including the killing of demonstrators. International demonstrations in solidarity with those in the country occurred, and the movement also grew increasingly critical of Muhammadu Buhari's government response to the protests.

SARS officers were alleged to profile young Nigerians, mostly males, based on fashion choices, tattoos and hairstyles. They were also known to set up illegal road blocks, conduct unwarranted checks and searches, make arrests and detain without warrant or trial, rape women, and extort young male Nigerians for driving exotic vehicles and using laptops and iPhones. Nigerians shared stories and video evidence of how SARS officers engaged in kidnapping, murder, theft, rape, torture, unlawful arrests, humiliation, unlawful detention, extrajudicial killings and extortion of Nigerian citizens. A large number of the victims of the abuses of SARS were young male Nigerians.

The End SARS protest movement was ultimately suppressed by the Nigerian military, leading to the death of several non-violent protesters at Lekki tollgate, Lagos.

The 2020 stage of the protests saw huge and dominant Generation Z participation, and in later years was labelled as part of the Gen Z protests wave (due to END SARS' demographics and methodology) that took place around the world in the following 5 years.

== Background ==
The Special Anti-Robbery Squad (SARS) was a unit of the Nigeria Police Force under the State Criminal Investigation and Intelligence Department (SCIID). It was founded in late 1992 as one of the 14 units in the Force Criminal Investigation and Intelligence Department, which was established to detain, investigate, and prosecute people involved in crimes like armed robbery, kidnapping, and other violent crimes. The squad was created as a masked police unit to perform undercover operations against violent crimes like armed robbery, car snatching, kidnapping, cattle rustling, and the bearing and use of illegal firearms.

SARS had been accused of several human rights violations, illegal "stop and searches", illegal arrests and detentions, extrajudicial killings, sexual harassment of women and brutalising of young male Nigerians. The human rights abuses were documented in trending videos on social media.

In 2017, Nigerian activists, youth and celebrities across the nation took to the streets in a peaceful protest to spread awareness of SARS brutality and extortions and to demand its disbanding. The protests also moved to social media using the hashtag #EndSARS.

A 2016 report by Amnesty International, indicted SARS maintaining that the squad was responsible for human rights abuses, cruelty, degrading treatment of Nigerians in their custody, and other widespread torture. Some of the human rights abuses by SARS include the shooting of their detainees in the leg, mock executions and threats of execution, hanging and physical assault. A 2020 publication by the organisation documented 82 cases of abuses and extra judicial killings by SARS between January 2017 and May 2020.

== Initial protests and reactions ==
Amnesty International accused the SARS officials of regularly detaining young male Nigerians illegally and extorting money from their relatives. In 2018, Nigerian rapper Michael Ugochukwu Stephens professionally known Ruggedman joined the campaign to end police brutality by releasing a single titled, Is Police Your Friend? In 2017, a petition signed by 10,195 people was submitted to Nigeria's National Assembly calling for a total disbandment of SARS. A few Senators backed the call for total disbandment of the unit. Consideration was given to reforming the force, rather than full disbandment due to the number of cases falling.

The campaigners moved from social media using the #EndSARS hashtag to an organized, peaceful protests in Abuja, Lagos, Ibadan, Osun, Benin, Ughelli, Warri, Ilorin, Ogbomosho, Owerri, Jos, Kaduna, Calabar and other Nigerian cities and states, threatening to continue if the government refused to disband the force.

Not only were there campaigners in Nigeria utilising the hashtag and having protests, but they were also done in London and some parts of America recognizing this situation as a global event.

In response to the campaign, then-Nigeria Police Force Public Relations Officer Jimoh Moshood accused the campaigners of being "criminals". Despite this, the then Inspector General of Nigeria Police Force Ibrahim K. Idris ordered the reform and reorganisation of SARS.

== October 2020 second wave ==
On Saturday 3 October 2020, a video showing a SARS police officer shooting a young Nigerian at Ughelli, Southern Delta State trended on the Internet. It was alleged that the police officers took away the young man's vehicle – a Lexus SUV. The trending video caused public outcry on social media, especially on Twitter, with the #EndSARS hashtag trending.

Just as #EndSARS began to trend on Twitter, on Monday 5 October 2020, another report surfaced of SARS officers killing a 20-year-old up-and-coming musician named Daniel Chibuike, popularly called 'Sleek' in his neighbourhood. According to eyewitnesses, Sleek was sitting in front of a hotel with a friend when some SARS officers approached them, prompting them to flee. The officers chased after the pair, shouting "thief", before shooting Sleek as they ran through a supermarket. His friend was then arrested.

On Thursday 8 October 2020, nationwide protests on #EndSARS started after weeks of outrage and anger with videos and pictures showing police brutality, harassment and extortion in Nigeria. The protests were led predominantly by young Nigerians in different cities alongside many activists and celebrities. Nigeria Police Force disrupted the protests in some cities, throwing teargas, using water cannons and shooting at unarmed peaceful protesters as seen in Abuja and Osun. This led to the death of Jimoh Isiaq in Ogbomoso, Oyo State. By Wednesday, 14 October 2020, the End SARS protests were still on-going with young people in different parts of Nigeria intensifying their calls for reforms and accountability in police operations. On October 20 the Nigerian Army murdered protesters at the Lekki tollgate. The government and army deny these allegations till date.

=== Five demands ===
On Sunday, 11 October 2020, the protestors made a list of five demands to be met by the Federal Government of Nigeria. The demands which were signed by a group called 'A Nigerian Youth' demanded for the immediate release of all arrested during the protests as well as justice and compensation for all who died through police brutality in Nigeria. They also demanded that an independent body be set up within 10 days to investigate and prosecute all reports of police misconduct. The protestors also asked for the psychological evaluation and retraining of SARS operatives before they are deployed to any other police unit. Lastly, they asked for adequate increase in the salaries for officers of the Nigerian police.

=== Nigerian Government response ===
In response to the public outcry on police brutality, the Inspector-General of the Nigeria Police banned the FSARS, Special Tactical Squad (STS), Intelligence Response Team (IRT), Anti-Cultism Squad and other tactical units from mounting of roadblocks, checkpoints, stop-and-search and other routine and patrols. Similar bans had been announced multiple times over the previous four years, causing citizens of Nigeria to question whether the bans would actually be upheld. There were further reports of SARS officers involved in killings across the country. As this was the fourth time that the Nigerian government had announced a similar ban on SARS activity, protesters insisted that the notorious police unit be entirely disbanded and wide-ranging reform of the force to follow.

On 19 October 2020, President Muhammadu Buhari reacted to the continuation of the movement by warning young Nigerians of anarchists that were allegedly attempting to hijack the protests and stated that the federal government "would not tolerate anarchy in the country".

=== Central bank freezes account of protesters ===
On Tuesday, 20 October 2020, the Central Bank of Nigeria and its governor, Godwin Emefiele, obtained an exparte motion to freeze the accounts of notable participants in the End SARS protest. In an exclusive report by Peoples Gazette, court documents showed that the Central Bank of Nigeria failed to give any justification for the freezing order. Twenty protesters with banking with Access Bank plc, Fidelity Bank Nigeria, First Bank of Nigeria, Guaranty Trust Bank, United Bank for Africa and Zenith Bank had all accounts linked to them placed under "post no debit".

== Timeline of events ==
=== 8 October ===
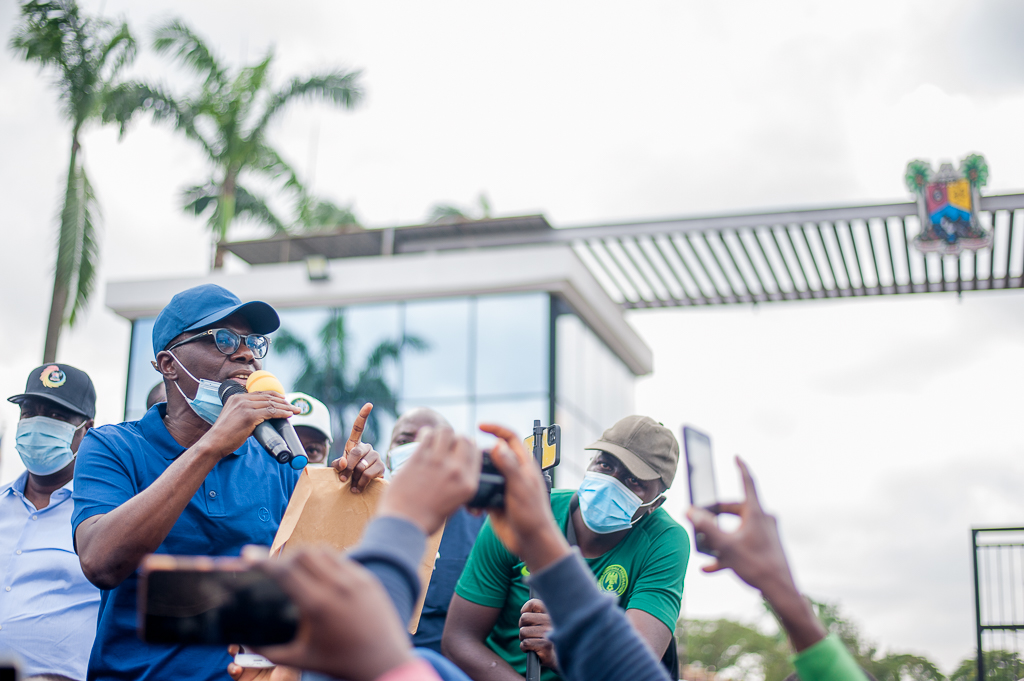
Lagos State governor Babajide Sanwo-Olu, addressing protesters gathered at Alausa, Lagos

Nigerian youths protested on EndSARS at the Lagos State Governor's House on Thursday 8 October and slept at the gate of the government house till Friday 9 October 2020 when the deputy governor addressed the protesters. Among the Lagos State EndSARS Protesters were celebrities Falz, Runtown, Don Jazzy, Olu Jacobs, Eedris Abdulkareem and a host of others including several comedians and other media personalities.

=== 9 October ===
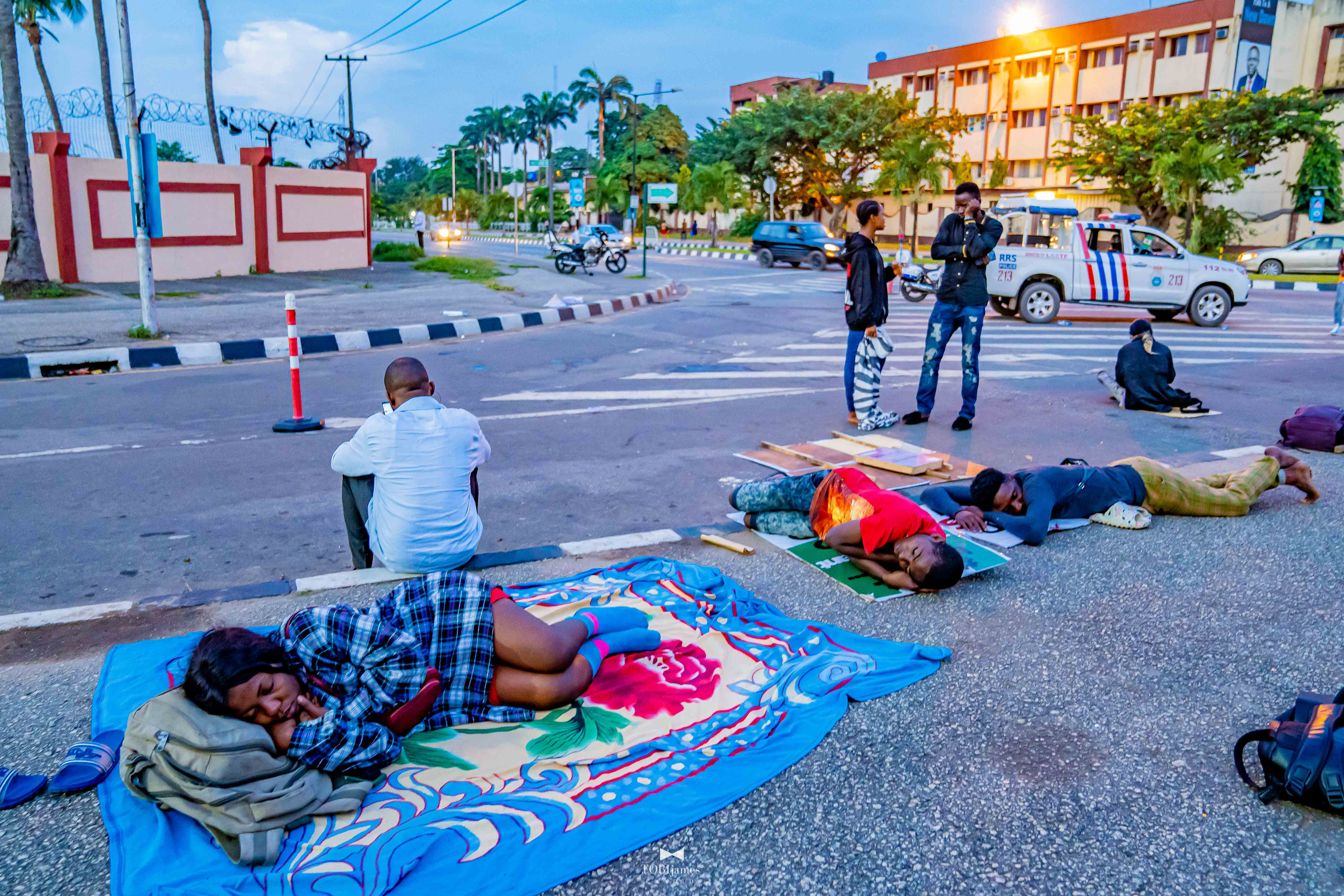
Resting protesters in Lagos, Nigeria

On Friday, 9 October 2020, the deputy governor of Lagos State, Femi Hamzat addressed the protesters and acknowledged that police officers do not have the right to trample on the rights of law-abiding citizens based on their appearance or on items in their possession. He condemned police brutality and promised that the Lagos government will take action necessary to end it. The deputy governor also stated that four years previously, he had been harassed by SARS police who were not in uniform.

The Lagos State House of Assembly held an emergency parliamentary sitting to deliberate the petition of the EndSARS protesters. The parliamentarians made a seven-point resolution, as follows: Nigeria's Senate and House of Assembly should probe FSARS, the Police Commissioner should protect protesters, molestation of youths should be stopped, institution of public inquiry on the extrajudicial killings by Senate President and the House of Representatives Speaker, proscription of SARS and its replacement by a new unit with a clear code of conduct, and sanction of illegalities.

Nigerian youths protested on EndSARS, at the headquarters of Nigeria Police Force in Federal Capital Territory, Abuja and vow to camp at headquarters till Inspector-General of Police, Mohammed Adamu, addresses them.

=== 10 October ===
While the protest continued on Saturday 10 October 2020, the Nigerian police started dispersing the youths with tear gas and water. The co-convener of Bring Back Our Girls, Aisha Yesufu, Rinu Oduala, popularly called @SavvyRinu on Twitter, and other protesters were reportedly manhandled by the Nigerian police.

The EndSARS protest in Ogbomosho, Oyo State turned violent as Nigerian police were alleged to have injured seven protesters and shot dead a young man known as Jimoh Isiaka during the protest, Traditional Rulers used the Nigerian Police to forcefully send back protesters. Jimoh Isiaka was taken to Bowen University Teaching Hospital for medical care and later died at the hospital. In response to the death of the protesters, the commissioner of police of Oyo State, Nwachukwu Enwonwu, denied the allegation that the police killed the protester. He said that the police used tear gas to prevent protesters from attacking and entering the police station. The governor of Oyo State, Seyi Makinde sent a condolence message on the demise of the protester and promised to investigate the incident.

=== 11 October ===
On Sunday, 11 October 2020, Nigeria's former Inspector-General of Police, Mohammed Adamu announced the "dissolution" of SARS. Many Nigerians within the movement criticised the announcement, however, pointing out that similar promises had been made in earlier years and that the government's plan was to reassign SARS officers to other police departments rather than eliminate them from the force entirely. The protests continue despite the "dissolution" as many do not believe the pronouncement.

David Adeleke, a popular musician known as Davido joined a group of #EndSARS protesters in Abuja to call for the end police brutality and the notorious police unit in the city. The police started dispersing the protesters with tear gas, live bullets and water cannons.

Three more protestors were shot dead in Ogbomoso, Oyo State, following a killing the day before.

=== 12 October ===
On Monday, 12 October 2020, the Governor of Lagos State Babajide Sanwo-Olu and the Minister of Police Affairs, Maigari Dingyadi, urged protestors to believe that SARS has been disbanded. On Monday, 12 October 2020 the Rivers State Governor, Nyesom Wike announced that the End SARS protests are disallowed in Rivers State. He banned all forms of protests in Rivers State. On Monday, 12 October 2020, the Governor of Oyo State, Seyi Makinde barred Police from engaging with the protestors in order to avert further casualties from the pandemic.

A bystander watching the protest was shot dead by members of the Nigeria Police Force in Surulere while leaving 4 injured and they also arrested and detained peaceful Protesters. The protests in Lagos at Lekki-Epe Expressway toll gate, Murtala Mohammed International airport toll gate, Alausa, Ikorodu Road and Yaba caused heavy traffic gridlock and crippled businesses as young people continued to demand #EndSARS #SARSMustEnd.

Protests continued in Abuja as young people continued to march against police harassment, brutality and extortion. They blocked the Berger roundabout to draw attention to their demands. Earlier on in the day, the protestors had been challenged by Pro-SARS sympathizers who were marching in support of the Inspector General of Police Mohammed Adamu and the Nigerian President Muhammed Buhari under the aegis of Citizens Action for Good Governance.

Protesters in Oyo State with placards calling for the disbandment of SARS, an end to police brutality extortion and extrajudicial killing demonstrated in front of University of Ibadan and Iwo Road in Ibadan. The protests locked down Iwo Road making vehicular movement to be at a standstill.

=== 13 October ===
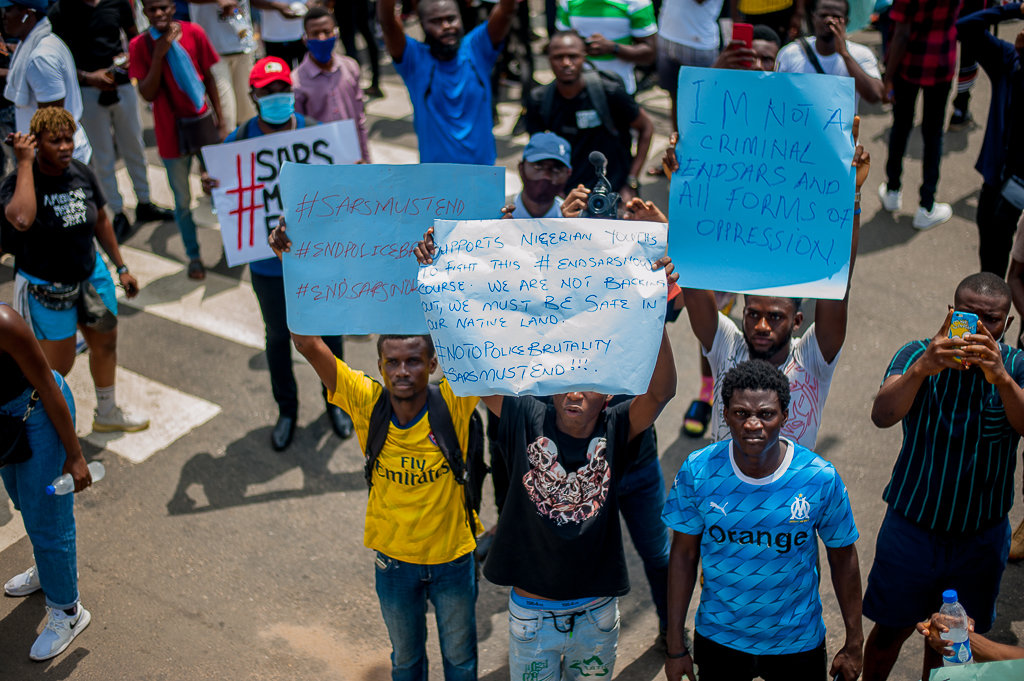
EndSARS protesters in Lagos

On Tuesday, 13 October 2020, Ifeanyi Okowa the Governor of Delta State said that the #EndSARS protest is a result of failed leadership. The governor also announced the constitution of a five-member Police Complaints Committee with two representatives from youth organisations. The governor had earlier appealed to the police to desist from harassing the protesters as people were free to express grievances in a democratic dispensation. On Tuesday, 13 October 2020, the Public Relations Officer of the Nigerian Police Force, Frank Mba, announced the setting up of a Special Weapon and Tactics Team (SWAT) to replace SARS. The new outfit, which was expected to take off within the next 7 days, was to undergo psychological and medical evaluation to determine their fitness.

The protest was taken to the National Assembly. Moving from Banex junction Abuja, protesters peacefully marched to the junction leading to the National Assembly around 2 p.m. where they were stopped by soldiers who violently resisted their movement and injured some protesters in the process. ARISE TV news crew who were recording the fracas at the entry of the National Assembly were attacked. Ferdinard Duruoha was one of the crew members who were assaulted while Francis Ogbonna a cameraman with the same news outfit was attacked the previous day while covering the announcement of dissolution of SARS by the Inspector General of Police.

The Governor of Lagos State promised to set up a two hundred million naira (N200M) fund for residents of the State who have been victims of police brutality. He met with President Muhammadu Buhari to present the demands of the protesters in Lagos State. A video surfaced from this meeting showing the president chuckle as the governor talked about his state's compensation fund for victims. The president's actions met a lot of negative criticisms from Nigerians.

According to a press release signed by spokesman of the president, Femi Adesina the Nigerian Government had agreed to the five demands of the End SARS protestors. The agreement was reached at a meeting organised by the Office of the Inspector General of Police and National Human Rights Commission (NHRC) was attended by stakeholders which include officials of Ministry of Police Affairs and Police Service Commission, representatives of Civil Society organisations and activists from the entertainment industry and #EndSARS movement.

The leader of the Indigenous People Of Biafra, Nnamdi Kanu urged the protesters not to give up. He advised the protesters to resist being compromised in their demands.

The protests continued in Lagos. Young people carrying placards denouncing SARS and appealing for an end to police harassment, extortion and brutality blocked the Lagos-Ibadan expressway.

=== 14 October ===
On Wednesday, 14 October 2020, protesters in Lagos were attacked with cutlasses, sticks and charms. In Abuja, protesters were attacked by people with cutlasses and cudgels at Berger roundabout. Cars were destroyed and some of the protestors were injured.

=== 15 October ===
On Thursday, 15 October 2020, the prohibition of demonstrations in the Federal Capital Territory Security Committee was announced. The decision was taken at a meeting which held on Wednesday, 14 October 2020 and which was chaired by FCT Minister, Malam Muhammad Bello. The announcement recognised the rights of citizens to gather and demonstrate however, it went on to point out that the EndSARS protests were unruly, caused discomfort to people, violated COVID-19 protocols and should be discontinued, as Government had met the demands of the protesters. Nigerians thought this absurd since there had been elections in Ondo and Edo along with massive rallies in preceding weeks. Buhari's daughter had also had her wedding ceremony. At the peak of the pandemic, Abba Kyari, late chief of staff to the president of Nigeria, was buried without adherence to COVID-19 guidelines.

People conveyed by Lagos state buses attacked protesters near the state secretariat in Alausa.

=== 16 October ===
On Friday, 16 October 2020, the hacktivist group, Anonymous hacked the Twitter account of the National Broadcasting Commission and posted a message which stated "We #Anonymous will continue supporting Nigerians" in a support for the ongoing protests.

Thousands of protesters gathered at the Admiralty Way Plaza toll gate, Lekki and at the Lagos State Government Secretariat, Alausa, Ikeja to hold a candlelight session for the various victims of SARS/police killings.

A day after the FCTA banned protests across the Federal Capital Territory amidst fear of a second wave of the COVID-19 outbreak due to the protests, youths protesting against police brutality and abuses moved their protest from City gate to Airport road where they obstructed both incoming and outgoing commuters thereby causing a gridlock leaving thousands stranded.

=== 20 October – The Lekki Toll Gate Shooting ===
Following violent escalations which included attacks by agitators against both protesters and police, the governor of Lagos State, Babajide Sanwo-Olu, declared a state-wide 24-hour curfew effective 4:00 PM WAT on 20 October. During this time, images of some persons alleged to be working with the Lagos State Government and the Lekki Concession Company removing cameras (later confirmed by the Lagos State Government to be laser cameras and not CCTV cameras as earlier publicized on social media) at the toll gate circulated on End SARS on X and street lights at the toll gate vicinity were turned off. A few hours later, it was reported that armed men of the Nigerian Army arrived at the scene of the protest and opened fire on peaceful and unarmed protesters, thereby resulting in a disputed number of deaths. A clip of the shooting videoed by a brave Nigerian youth, DJ Switch, trended on the Internet showing how live round of bullets were being shot at innocent protesters who crouched on the ground, holding hands together and singing the Nigerian National Anthem. There were also reports that at least 50 other people were injured. However, the Lagos State government later reported that the shooting resulted in up to 25 injured, and only 2 dead. Despite the fact that the curfew was extended till 9:00 PM, soldiers of the Nigerian Army started shooting before 7:00 PM.

In November 2020, the National Economic Council (NEC) announced that each state and the Federal Capital Territory (FCT), Abuja, should establish a judicial panel of inquiry to investigate cases of police brutality against protesters and compensate the victims as well as human rights violations. The Judicial Panel of Inquiry and Restitution for Victims of the Special Anti-Robbery Squad (SARS) released a report on November 15, 2021, sharing their findings.

=== 21 October ===
Following the killings on 20 October, video evidence showed that more shootings were still being carried out by the Nigerian Army and the Nigerian Police on the unarmed protesters. Some people also attacked and burnt buildings, vehicles, TV stations and raided the Oba of Lagos' palace. The governor of Lagos had said that there were no casualties from the incident of the previous day but later tweeted that there had been reports of one casualty which negated the report sent in by various Twitter and Instagram users who had live recordings of the killings. While the protesters gathered again at the Lekki toll gate where the shooting took place on Tuesday 20 October, they were forced out by police. While the protesters defied the curfew imposed by the Lagos state Governor, hoodlums burnt about 30 government buses at a bus station. Also burnt was Television Continental Station (TVC), which is linked to a former governor of the state, Bola Ahmed Tinubu, who is the current President of Nigeria.

About seven people were reportedly killed within 24 hours since soldiers opened fire at protesters in Lagos. Authorities did not deny carrying out a crackdown, but refused to claim the deaths as of 21 October 2020. Brutality by the police forces made the protesters more angry intensifying the scale of the protests.

=== 22 October ===
On Thursday, 22 October, it was reported that armed men began shooting at protesters in Oyigbo, Port Harcourt. The attackers allegedly broke into homes, killing people inside, and then torching down properties.

=== 24 October ===
On 24 October, reporter Pelumi Onifade was last seen alive while detained in police custody. At the time, he was covering the #EndSARS protests for Gboah TV. His body would later be found at a mortuary several days later under unclear circumstances.

== February 2021 protest against the reopening of Lekki toll gate ==
After the Nigerian government announced that activities at the Lekki toll gate would restart, Nigerians not satisfied with the decision to restart activities at a symbolic site where reportedly unarmed citizens died during the End SARS protest called for a fresh protest to start at 7am on 13 February 2021. On 13 February 2021 security agencies were at the site, reportedly armed, and awaiting the protesters. It was reported that a Nigerian internet comedian named Mr Macaroni and others who came to observe the peaceful protest were arrested.

== 2021 End SARS Memorial protest ==
In October 2021, Minister of Police Affairs Mohammed Maigari Dingyadi reported to Deutsche Welle that police brutality had been "reduced to the barest minimum" since the End SARS protests. In the same segment, activist Victoria Ibezim-Ohaeri commented that civil rights continued to backslide after the protests and that citizens had a "cautiousness to resist the current political trajectory."

After the aftermath of End SARS protest, End SARS Activists announced that there would be a memorial to mark the Lekki Shootings. On 19 October 2021, Mr Macaroni and Falz announced that the protest will be carried out by cars in accordance with the message by the Lagos State Police force which prohibited any form of protest. The protest took place mostly in Lagos, Abuja, Port Harcourt among others.

== Nigerian protests by state ==
=== Delta State ===
On Saturday, 10 October 2020, the #EndSARS protest started from the Ekiugbo section of Ughelli, Delta State, went through the Ughelli Market, Ughelli Area Command and Isoko Road. The protests led to traffic gridlocks at the Ughelli–Patani section of the East–West Road. However, at Otovwodo Junction, fracas ensued as the peaceful protest assumed took another turn when hoodlums, motorcycle rider and others joined the youths. A police officer, Corporal Etaga Stanley of 'A' Division, Ughelli was disarmed, killed and his weapon and ammunition taken.

On Wednesday, 14 October 2020, young people in Effurun and Warri, Delta State joined in the protests.

=== Anambra State ===
On Saturday, 10 October 2020, hundreds of young people gathered at Ekwueme Square, Awka in the morning hours and peacefully marched past the Eke Awka market, and through the major streets of the town with placards. SARS Awkuzu which is well known for human rights abuses is located in Anambra State. The protests continued in Onitsha, the commercial nerve centre of Anambra State on Monday, 12 October, with protesters demanding that SARS be completely disbanded.

Protests continued in Awka on Wednesday, 14 October 2020 with protesters demanding for a total reform of the Nigerian Police Force.

On Friday, 16 October 2020, #EndSARS protesters including popular musicians and Anambra indigenes Phyno, Flavour, KCee, MasterKraft, marched from Awka, the state capital to Awkuzu town, where the dreaded SARS unit is situated, calling for the total shutdown of the office. The peaceful protesters were shot at by the officers of the supposedly dissolved SARS.

=== Abia State ===
A similar protest was held simultaneously in Umuahia, capital of Abia State, by other youths in the state. They visited the police headquarters on Bende Road and Abịa State House of Assembly as well as the Abia Government House.

In Aba, the state's commercial nerve centre, youths took to the streets protesting police brutality on citizens.

In a statement on his Twitter handle, the governor said: "I have taken note of the peaceful protests tagged #EndSARS and wish to assure Abịa youth and the general public that we will take up their concerns and ensure that your voices are heard at the right quarters."

=== Kwara State ===
On Thursday 8 October 2020 the campaigners against the excesses of the Special Anti-Robbery Squad (SARS), the police squad known for its human rights abuses and extrajudicial killings marched peacefully through some streets of Ilorin, Kwara state capital, demanding outright ban of operations of SARS by the Nigeria Police. On 12 October 2020, protesters surrounded the Kwara State government house where on behalf of Governor AbdulRahman AbdulRazaq, the deputy governor, Kayode Alabi, assured that their complaints have been heard.

=== Osun State ===
On Monday, 12 October 2020, protesters in Osogbo, Osun State took to the streets of the capital town to protest against SARS with placards demanding that the squad be disbanded. The protests which took off from Olaiya junction and moved to the State House of Assembly caused traffic disruptions at the gate of government house, Osogbo as the protesters demanded that the Governor address them.

=== Rivers State ===
Aggrieved Nigerians in Port Harcourt, Rivers State, on Tuesday 13 2020, took to the streets of Port Harcourt, Rivers state capital, to protest against police brutality in defiance to the directive of the State Governor Ezenwo Nyesom Wike who had earlier issued a statement to the general public that all forms of protests have been banned throughout the State. The state governor, having observed this defiance by the protesters, joined them in solidarity, citing how Rivers State citizens had suffered so much police brutality carried out by members of SARS.

=== Ogun State ===
Fifteen #EndSARS protestors were arrested in Ogun State. While others were released, three of the protesters; Adeniji Sodiq, Mutairu Faruq and Olatoye Joseph, who were arrested at the palace of the king of Owu on Friday, 9 October 2020 were charged for murder by the police. After review of all evidence and as recommended by the Ogun State Attorney General, the Governor, Dapo Abiodun gave orders for their release as the charges against the protesters were withdrawn. At Akute/Ajuwon/Agbole axis, Ogun State, Femi Kuti an Afrobeat musician, the son of late music icon Fela Kuti joined the protests and helped to stop many protesters from being arrested

=== Enugu State ===
On Tuesday, 13 October 2020, hundreds of protesters from different parts of Enugu State with placards denouncing and asking for the end to SARS, police brutality, extortion and harassment converged and moved from Okpara Square, Enugu to the Criminal Investigation Department where they submitted the five demands of the EndSARS protests. They were joined by musicians, Chinedu Izuchukwu Okoli known as Flavour, Chibuzor Nelson Azubuike, popularly known as Phyno and Zoro, a rapper. The protestors were later joined by the deputy governor of the State, Lolo Cecilia Ezeilo.

=== Ebonyi State ===
On Tuesday, 13 October 2020, hundreds of protesters in Abakiliki, capital of Ebonyi State took to the streets with placards demanding an end to police brutality and the prosecution of guilty officers.

=== Edo State ===
The #EndSARS protest in Benin City turned violent on Friday, 16 October 2020 as the protesters that gathered at the Edo State House of Assembly got attacked with stones and bullets by suspected thugs who claimed that the protesters disturbed their daily businesses. Two protesters were killed and many were injured in the attack.

The protesters, in retaliation, took the fight back to where the thugs converged at the museum ground in King's Square (Ring Road) where they engaged in a brawl. The activities of the protesters left the Ring Road deserted due to fear of possible escalation of violence as motorists sought for alternative routes to their destination.

The Edo State governor, Godwin Obaseki, condemned the attack on the #EndSARS protesters in Benin City by unidentified hoodlums. He stated that a thorough investigation would be effected immediately to bring the culprits to justice. In a statement, the governor commissioned the Edo State police command to come out fully and provide appropriate security to the protesters, as they were exercising their rights as concerned citizens of Nigeria.

According to him, "I have just learnt that hoodlums have attacked #EndSARS protesters, who have conducted themselves peacefully in Benin City. I extend condolences to the victims of the attacks, including those who lost their lives and others who were injured by the thugs. It is disheartening that anyone would attack a peaceful assembly of young people who are expressing genuine concerns over police brutality and intimidation in their own country. I hereby call on the Edo State Police Command to get out on the streets and provide adequate security for the protesters and ensure that no one is harassed in the course of exercising their rights."

On 19 October 2020, news broke that "hoodlums" had stormed the correctional center in Edo state to free jailed inmates as part of the End SARS movement demands.

=== Plateau State ===
Jos, the capital of Plateau State saw youths in their number storm the city centre demanding the disbandment of the newly created Special Weapons and Tactics (SWAT) police unit by the Inspector General of Police (IG), Mohammed Adamu.

The protesters called on President Muhammadu Buhari and the Police Service Commission (PSC) to overhaul the entire Nigerian Police Force.

Displaying placards with various inscriptions such as #EndSARS; #EndSWAT; "We don't want SWAT"; "There's no difference between SWAT and SARS"; "We want complete and total overhaul of all security apparatus in the country", the youths stormed the Plateau State House of Assembly, The Plateau State Government House and other major streets in the city, calling on the state and federal government and the Nigerian Police Force to take action over the spate of extrajudicial killings by the operatives of the Nigerian Police. Placing it in context of the state, they called on the government to look into the general issues of insecurity in Plateau State among other neighbouring states.

==== 20 October ====
On Tuesday 20 October 2020, while protest was going on, thugs hauled the Jos city biggest market, Terminus, where they burned cars, hauled shops and attacked unarmed #EndSARS protesters.

=== Imo State ===
In Imo State, the protests started within the same date as other major states in Nigeria. It became more of destruction of police stations and violent protests after its peaceful beginning. Police stations were burnt in Orlu, Orji and Nworieubi. Soldiers were also killed too, but those reports were few. The violence escalated to an extent that it became dangerous to come out on the streets.

== Voluntary donations ==
The #EndSARS protests were sustained by voluntary donations made by Nigerian citizens and the international community. There were voluntary donations of food items, water, and professional services by lawyers and doctors for protesters. Donations also came from local tech start-ups whose young male workers were constantly harassed by SARS and profiled as internet fraudsters because of laptops usually found in their possession.

== International protests ==
International demonstrations were organised by the Nigerian diaspora in Europe, the Americas, Oceania, and elsewhere in Africa. Many Nigerian and Nigerian diaspora celebrities gave supportive statements on social media and took part in protests, while demonstrators pledged to continue until the demands were met.

=== Canada ===
On Monday, 12 October 2020, Nigerians living in the Waterloo Region of Ontario organised a peaceful demonstration in support of the #EndSARS movement. The group gathered in the Waterloo Public Square chanting "What do we want? End SARS!"

=== Germany ===
On Friday, 23 October, Nigerians and German sympathizers organized a demonstration of several hundred participants in support of the #EndSARS movement in Stuttgart.

=== Hungary ===
On Wednesday, 22 October 2020, Nigerians, friends of Nigeria and Social Justice flooded the streets of Budapest in support of the #EndSARS protest in Nigeria. The Association of Nigerians in Hungary was led by Frederick Odorige, the president, Precious Amaewhule, the public relations officer, Felix Yellowee the financial secretary, Favour Opara, Fafore Adebowale and others. Protesters met in front of the Hungarian parliament by 10 a.m. and marched under police escort to the Office of the European Union where they submitted a letter requesting EU visa travel ban on some Nigerian politicians and heads of the Police and Army responsible for the killing of peaceful protesters and attack on the rights of the Nigerian people who demanded an end to police brutality.

They later moved from there to the Nigerian embassy where they were received by Ambassador Eniola Ajayi. Odorige addressed the protesters and the embassy staff on the embarrassment of Nigerians in diaspora due to the actions of the Nigerian government back home and the senseless killing of armless and law-abiding protesters by the Nigerian Army and Police. The protesters openly called for the resignation of President Muhammadu Buhari and the sack of the inspector general of police, Mohammed Adamu and the chief of Army Staff, Tukur Yusuf Buratai. A letter was presented to the ambassador, who also addressed the protesters.

=== Ireland ===
==== Dublin ====
On Sunday, 11 October 2020, Nigerians in Dublin gathered in front of the Nigerian Embassy to show solidarity with the #EndSARS protests in Nigeria. They denounced police brutality and SARS.

=== United Kingdom ===
==== London ====
On Sunday 11 October 2020, Ayodeji Ibrahim Balogun, a popular Nigerian singer known as Wizkid, Dr Dipo Awojide and many other Nigerians led a protest in support of the EndSARS protest at the Nigeria High Commission, Thai Square, London. It has been reported that Wizkid has called out the Nigerian president Muhammadu Buhari on Twitter over his silence on scrapping the notorious police unit.

==== Manchester ====
On Saturday 17 October 2020, Nigerians and other supporters organised a peaceful demonstration in Moston, Manchester, UK, in support of the #EndSARS movement.

=== United States ===
==== New York ====
On Sunday, 11 October 2020, young Nigerians in New York converged at the Nigerian Consulate General in Midtown to protest against SARS. They shared their experiences with SARS while in Nigeria and asked that the outfit be totally disbanded so that young people can move freely without being profiled as criminals because of their dressing, accent or the type of vehicle they use.

==== Michigan ====
On Sunday, 18 October 2020, Nigerians and other supporters organised a peaceful demonstration at Southfield in support of the #EndSARS movement.

==== Ohio ====
On Sunday, 25 October 2020, Nigerians in Diaspora and other supporters organised a peaceful demonstration at Ohio State House, Columbus in support of the #EndSARS movement.

=== South Africa ===
Protest ensued in Pretoria, South Africa on the 21st of October 2020 in solidarity with the protests that were going on in Nigeria and other parts of the world against the oppressive treatment of the Special Anti-Robbery Squad (SARS). Hundreds of Nigerian Nationals in black t-shirts and colors of the Nigerian flag, demonstrated towards the Nigerian Embassy condemning the brutality of SARS and the corrupt leadership in Nigeria. According to one of the protesters, "There has been a lot of unlawful killings in Nigeria and brutality from the police and army. Now the youth has woken up and we're saying they should stop killing us,"

Also in Cape Town, protesters came together in front of the parliament building to express how they felt about the dysfunctionality of the Nigerian government as the police force appointed to protect the citizens were the same set of people killing them and extorting from them for no just cause.

== Role of the internet ==
The 2020 EndSARS protest was largely effective due to the use of digital technology, particularly the internet. Nigerian youths tagged the 'soro soke' generation started the protest from Twitter before taking it to the streets. 'Soro soke' is a Yoruba phrase which means 'speak louder'. It was used on social media and offline to encourage people to speak up in protest.

On 9 October 2020, the #EndSARS hashtag trended globally on social media. A report analysis showed that the online protest was responsible for 48 million mentions and Tweets from 5 million unique authors on Twitter between 5 October and 14 October 2020. The EndSARS protests, which started on 8 October 2020, continued in major cities across the country and attracted international mainstream media attention. It brought to the consciousness of the global world, the injustice meted out on the Nigerian youth by SARS officers and kept the Nigerian government on their toes in a never-seen before manner.

The campaign has witnessed reactions on social media from international celebrities such as Cardi B, Beyonce, Chimamanda Ngozi Adichie, Rihanna, Trey Songz, Big Sean, Jidenna, John Boyega, Kanye West, Drake, Diddy, Lewis Hamilton, among others, including footballers, Marcus Rashford, Odion Ighalo, and Mesut Ozil. The EndSARS protest was endorsed by Jack Dorsey, the C.E.O of Twitter with a unique emoji, and he promoted donations for the protest using Bitcoin With the news that SARS had been disbanded, Nigerians took the news with a grain of salt and carried on with pressing their demands for total disengagement of the unit and wide-ranging reform of the force. The hashtag on social media changed from #EndSARS to #SARSMustEnd! With the announcement of a new unit, Special Weapons and Tactics Team (SWAT), by the Nigerian Police to replace SARS, the hashtag for the protests quickly changed to #EndSWAT on Twitter. EndSWAT also trended.

On Thursday, 15 October 2020, Google Africa made a statement on its Twitter handle in support of the End SARS protests condemning police intimidation, oppression, and brutality while urging the government to speedily intervene and resolve the crisis.

Although the protest was cut short untimely on 20 October 2020 due to the Lekki Toll Gate Shooting, it lasted that long due to the internet. Mobilization of protesters, communication, and real-time updates took place via social media. Equally, funds to keep the protest going were raised on the internet. The Central Bank of Nigeria (CBN) initially ordered banks to freeze about 20 accounts linked to the protest fundraising, but cryptocurrency soon became an option. With the help of the Feminists Coalition, which was at the forefront of fundraising for the protest, about N87.4 million was raised. They disbursed funds for mental health support, security on protest grounds, medical emergency response, and relief for victims of SARS brutality and families of victims of extrajudicial killings.

EndSARS Legal aid led by Modupe Odele created a network of over 400 volunteer lawyers across Nigeria, representing illegally detained protesters. Nigerians and certain brands donated food, drinks, nose masks, and sometimes raincoats after calls were made on social media. The EndSARS Online Radio provided entertainment when needed and communication for youth protesting from remote places. Protesters were also connected to safe spaces to hide when there is chaos via the internet. And this is not forgetting that petitions played a huge role in getting the attention of international bodies, and they were signed on the internet.

== Celebrity actions ==
Many celebrities and Black Lives Matter activists wrote letters directed to President Buhari demanding justice for and the humane treatment of Nigerian people during the protests. Buhari was also urged to free jailed protestors. A letter organised by the Black Lives Matter co-founder Opal Tometi was signed by celebrities Alicia Keys, Donald Glover, Mark Ruffalo, and Kerry Washington, activist Greta Thunberg, as well as writers Reni Eddo-Lodge, Naomi Klein, and Afua Hirsch.

== Aftermath ==
"The Special Anti-Robbery Squad (SARS) of the Nigeria Police Force was dissolved with immediate effect", a statement from the office of the president, Muhammadu Buhari. The Lagos State Government through the office of the governor, Babajide Sanwolu denied any involvement or alleged massacre at the Lekki toll gate. However, the Nigerian Army, claimed to be invited by the Lagos State Government, but never shoot at protesters or using live ammunitions. The Lagos State Government on 19 October 2020 set up a four-man Judiciary Panel Committee led by Lagos State Attorney-General and Commissioner for Justice, Moyosore Onigbanjo (SAN). Other members of the committee are; Commissioner for Youths and Social Development, Segun Dawodu; Special Adviser, Works and Infrastructure, Aramide Adeyoye and permanent secretary, Cabinet Office, Tolani Oshodi. The committee was to look into the activities of SARS, the panel was also saddled with the investigation of the shootings that took place on 20 October 2020, at the Lekki Tollgate. The Panel presented a white paper on the 15th of November, 2021. Although, some prominent Nigerians like Femi Falana (SAN) and Festus Keyamo (SAN) challenged the constitutional legality of the panel. Sanwo-Olu signed an executive order for the establishment of Rebuild Lagos Trust Fund to aid in repairing facilities that were destroyed during the protest.

== See also ==
- End Bad Governance protests
- Occupy Nigeria
- 2018–2019 Nigerian protests
