= List of Nigerian human rights activists =

There are several human right activists in Nigeria.

This is a list of notable Nigerian human rights activists.

Name
Adeola Austin Oyinlade
Aminu Kano
Ayo Fasanmi
Ayodele Awojobi
Bamidele Aturu
Beko Ransome-Kuti
Bisi Adeleye-Fayemi
Dele Giwa
Emmanuel N. Onwubiko
Fela Kuti
Festus Keyamo
Funmilayo Ransome-Kuti
Femi Falana
Gani Fawehinmi
Kenneth Uwadi
Kiki Mordi
Ola Oni
Olikoye Ransome-Kuti
Olisa Agbakoba
Omoyele Sowore
Sonny Okosun
Segun Awosanya
Stephen Chukwumah
Abiola Akiyode-Afolabi
Priscilla Achapka
Toyin Ajao
Obioma Chukwuike
