= Admiralty Circle Plaza =

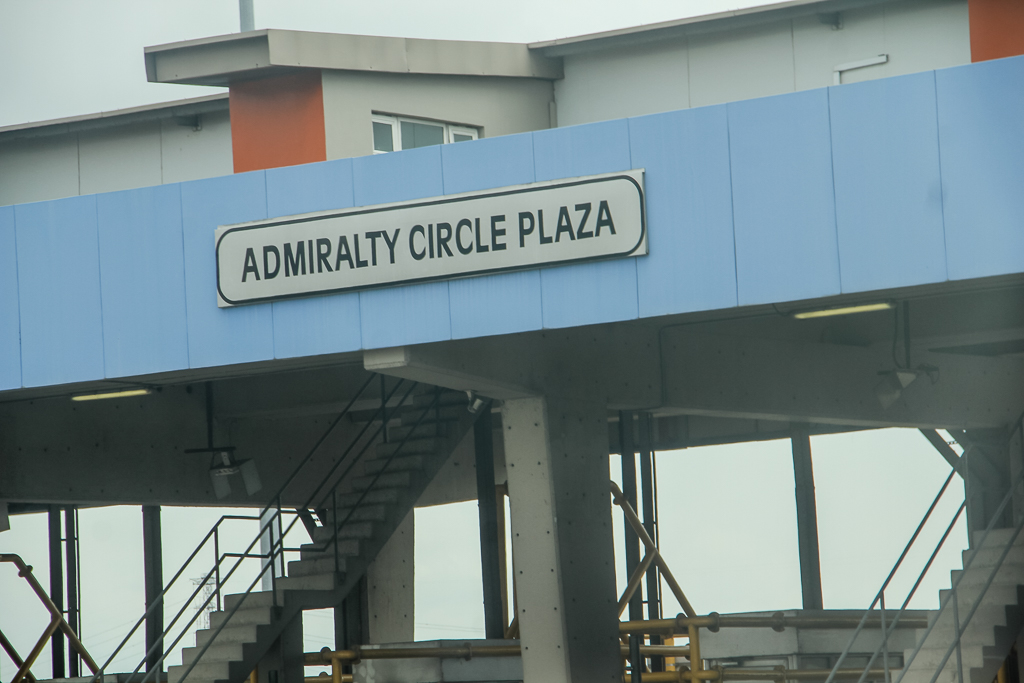
- Location: Lekki, Lagos State, Nigeria
- Opened: 3 January 2011; 15 years ago
- Developer: Messrs Lekki Concession Company Limited LCC
- Owner: Public Private Partnership

The Admiralty Circle Plaza, commonly known as the Lekki toll gate, is located in the Eti-Osa Local Government Area of Lagos State in Nigeria. It was established to collect tolls along the 49 km road expansion on Lekki–Eti-Osa Expressway. It is a Public Private Partnership (PPP) agreement between Lagos State's government and Messrs Ikeja Concession Company Limited LCC. The activity commenced at the plaza on 5 January 2011.

It was the site of the Lekki toll gate massacre during the End SARS movement. Following the protests, the toll gate remains inoperational as of 2024.

== The issues on Admiralty Circle Plaza ==
There was a disagreement between the residents of the 3 LGAs where the axis of the Admiralty Circle Toll Plaza was located. They declared that they would not agree to pay the tolls on that road.

They also complained that no alternative routes were provided while the construction of the toll plazas were going on. But this was refuted by the MD of Lekki Concession Company Limited (LCC), Mr Opuiyo Oforiokuma who stated that a by-pass was created for the motorists to cut off the expressway into Yesufu Abiodun Oniru Road down to City of David Church and to the Market, then connect back to the expressway.

However, the then Governor of Lagos State, Babatunde Fashola stopped the collection of tolls on the road on December 29, 2010, when the residents kept complaining. But the collection was approved again on November 14, 2011 by the Governor when the State House of Assembly presented its 2012 budget.

The toll was reviewed on February 1, 2018. The residents of the Eti-Osa Development Forum protest against the new tariff. The motorists who did not want to pay the new tariff were advised to sign up for the electronic tags (e-Tag). Those who signed up were given a 10% discount, which was liable to increase up to a 50% discount depending on how many times the motorists used the road.

== The reviewed tariff at the Admiralty Circle Toll Plaza ==
The owners of Saloon cars were rated:

From N120 at the Admiralty toll gate to pay N200

From N250 at the Ikoyi Link Bridge toll gate to pay N300

Buses:

From N80 to pay N100

SUVs:

From N150 at Admiralty toll gate to pay N250 and

From N300 at the Link Bridge to pay N400.
