= SOLID Nepal =

Non-profit organization in Nepal

Society for Local Integrated Development Nepal (SOLID Nepal) is a nongovernmental, apolitical and nonprofit organization, established in 1997, that works to address certain complications like sexual and reproductive health problems, non-communicable diseases and other issues like crosscuts.

SOLID Nepal works to generate evidences, and promotes healthy behaviour of the people through research studies, media & publications, advocacy, awareness & sensitization of issues, trainings and social mobilization by and with concerned stakeholders.

== Expertise ==
=== Research ===
Organizationally structured with research experts, SOLID Nepal has generated evidences through researches in health and development focused areas.

- An Operational Research (OR) on “Barriers to Effective Policy Implementation and Management of Human Resources for Health in Nepal” was successfully carried out following six different areas of HRH 2011.
- National level WHO STEP wise Non-Communicable Disease Risk Factors survey 2007/08 carried out in 15 districts of Nepal with the technical and financial support from South East Asia Regional Office, World Health Organization and planned by Ministry of Health and Population of Nepal.
- An Operational Research (OR) on “Barriers to Effective Policy Implementation and Management of Human Resources for Health in Nepal” was successfully carried out following six different areas of HRH 2011. Report 4,

- Young Peoples' Opinion on the Provision and Practices of Safe Abortion in Kathmandu Valley, Nepal

=== Publication ===
Since the beginning, SOLID Nepal has published ‘Youvan’, a bimonthly health magazine and was extended to the online version with the domain ‘www.youvanhealth.com’.

Other publication includes and guiding and teaching manuals on different issues related to Sexual & Reproductive Health, Non-communicable disease, Life skills-based education, Gender based violence and Youth friendly Health Services. Also, SOLID Nepal has published advocacy kits contenting issues related to child marriage for government stakeholders, community population, media personnel and others stakeholders. Apart from this, SOLID Nepal has published a book on Ayurveda ‘Ayurveda Science-2nd Edition’.

=== Training ===
SOLID Nepal has been empowering individuals of different age groups from national to grassroots levels through intensive trainings to make them competent enough to utilize the learning to contribute for the development of the neighbourhood, community, society and the nation.

To achieve this, SOLID Nepal has developed and produced training manuals on Adolescent Sexual & Reproductive Health and Right (ASRHR) for Peer Educators, Life Skill Based education on ASRHR for teachers and conducted trainings and refreshers' trainings in districts across the country to convey good understanding. Also, SOLID Nepal has been provided trainings to research enthusiasts about research methodologies.

- Training on Advocacy and HRH issues to 30 selected CSOs (5 CSOs from each development region and 5 CSOs from national CSOs)
- Training on Peer Education, 2010-2011
- Refresher's training on Peer Education, 2011-2012
- Training on Youth Friendly Health Services, 2010-2011
- Refresher's Training on Youth Friendly Health Services, 2011-2012

=== Workshops and seminars ===
Since the establishment, SOLID Nepal has conducted national representing workshops and seminars with the records of participation from government agencies, international and national aid agencies, like-minded organizations, media, and civil society organizations.

SOLID Nepal has conducted workshops on sensitizing different stakeholders towards the issues such as sexual and reproductive health of young people, armed conflict and women's SRH and Rights in Nepal, HIV/AIDS, and Prevention of Mother to Child Transmission (PMTCT) of HIV. SOLID Nepal also has conducted workshop on Research Methodologies, non-formal education.

- Workshop with Journalists to Review and Enhance their Involvement in Policy Review, Implementation and Monitoring 2013
- Media Sensitization Workshop 2010 and 2011
- National Advocacy Workshop for Improving Sexual and Reproductive Health of Young People by Increasing the Age at Marriage in Nepal 2009, 2010 and 2011

== Projects ==
HRH Assessment and Development of HRH Profile for the Public and the Private Health Sectors Workforce 2012, supported by World Health Organization, NHSSP (Nepal Health Sector Support Programme) and implemented by SOLID Nepal.

Improving Sexual and Reproductive Health of Young People by Increasing the Age at Marriage in India, Nepal and Bangladesh.

Gender Transformative Approaches for Improving Sexual and Reproductive Health of Young People In Nepal.

Support to Health Workforce Through Civil Society Engagement.

== See also ==
- Primary Health Care and Resource Centre
