= Aisha Yesufu =

Nigerian activist (born 1973)

Aisha Somtochukwu Yesufu
- Aisha Yesufu at Beyond the Ballot Summit (2026)
- Born: 12 December 1973 (age 52); Kano State, Nigeria
- Education: Bayero University Kano
- Occupations: Businesswoman; Activist
- Known for: #BringBackOurGirls, End SARS
- Spouse: Aliu Osigwe Yesufu
- Children: 2
- Awards: BBC's 100 Women in 2020 . Top 100 Most Influential Africans by New African magazine.

Aisha Somtochukwu Yesufu (born 12 December 1973), is a Nigerian political activist and businesswoman. She is the co-founder of #BringBackOurGirls movement, which brought attention to the abduction of over 200 girls from a secondary school in Chibok, Nigeria on the 14 April 2014, by the terrorist group Boko Haram. She has also been prominently involved in the End SARS movement against police brutality in Nigeria.

== Early life and education ==
Aisha Somtochukwu Yesufu was born and raised in Kano State, from Agbede in Edo State. She experienced the difficulties of being a girl in a heavily patriarchal environment. By the time she was eleven years old, she had no female friends, as they had all either married or died in childbirth. And by the time she was married at 24, most of her remaining friends were nearing grandmother status. She says her love of books helped her during childhood, reading made her realize "there was a world beyond the ghetto that I was growing up in … and I wanted that life". She applied to the Nigerian Defence Academy in 1991, but was rejected because of her gender (she was a woman). In 1992, she was initially admitted to Usmanu Danfodiyo University, however, after the school closed she enrolled at Ahmadu Bello University to study medicine. Yesufu later left Ahmadu Bello University as well, after the school was shut down following the killing of a professor in 1994. She ultimately completed her education at Bayero University Kano, from which she graduated with a degree in microbiology.

== Activism ==
Njideka Agbo wrote of Yesufu in The Guardian in 2019, "Often maligned for her stance on national issues in Nigeria by pro-government voices, she is not a run-of-the-mill activist. Her penchant for naming names has earned her truckloads of enemies, and perhaps, admirers".

=== #BringBackOurGirls ===
After the terrorist group, Boko Haram abducted 276 schoolgirls in 2014, Yesufu and Oby Ezekwesili co-founded the #BringBackOurGirls movement to push for their rescue. Yesufu was among the women protesters who marched on the Nigerian National Assembly, in the nation's capital, Abuja, on 30 April 2014.

=== End SARS ===
Yesufu has been a prominent member of the End SARS movement, which began in 2017 and draws attention to police brutality in Nigeria and draws its name from a controversial police unit in the Nigeria Police Force called the Special Anti-Robbery Squad (SARS). A photograph of her wearing hijab at an End SARS protest became an iconic symbol of the movement. Yesufu has said of the End SARS protests, "I will not be an irresponsible parent and leave this fight for my children. I am ready to sacrifice my life for my children to live. I brought them to this world, and I need to fix the world I put them in."

== Awards ==
Yesufu was among BBC's 100 Women in 2020. Yesufu was included in a list of the Top 100 Most Influential Africans by New African magazine in 2020. In 2023, Reputation Poll International (RPI) named Yesufu as one of the 14 Nigerians who made the list of '100 most reputable Africans'. She was also included in the list of the 50 Most Impactful Voices to mark 2023 International Women's Day. Additionally, Yesufu has won the Martin Luther King Award.

== Personal life ==
Yesufu married her husband, Aliu Osigwe Yesufu, in 1998. They have two children, Amir and Alliyah.
