= Segalink =

Nigerian realtor

- Born: Adesegun Olusegun Omotayo Awosanya
- Education: University of Lagos
- Occupations: Realtor, Human Rights Activist, Business & Strategic Consultant
- Known for: Founder/President, Social Intervention Advocacy Foundation (SIAF)
- Spouse: Odezi Faith Awosanya
- Website: segalink.com

Segun Awosanya, known as Segalink, is a Nigerian realtor, human rights activist, business consultant, and Apple developer since 1999.

Awosanya was one of the early organisers (advocates) of the campaign against police brutality in Nigeria using social media as a tool, while engaging authorities across arms of government with #EndSARS #ReformPoliceNG advocacy, which yielded results when the Buhari-led government of Nigeria announced a total overhaul of the department of Special Anti-Robbery Squad, popularly known as SARS.

== Career ==
Awosanya is the founder and president of the Social Intervention Advocacy Foundation (SIAF). He is also the founder and executive director of ALIENSMEDIA (a futuristic brand regarding identity media, technology, and brand strategy consultancy). He has continued to freely educate and enlighten the public through Twitter, with successful direct intervention in bridging institutional gaps between the people and government institutions.

Awosanya consults for several firms, governments, and non-governmental organizations in Nigeria on technology, business strategy, strategic communication, real estate investments and wealth management, personal development, crisis and perception management, soft skills, and media matters.

Awosanya facilitated and influenced the Nigerian socio-political space from 2014 till date through various advocacies. The most popular among them is #EndSARS, which focuses on the reformation of the criminal justice system via legislative reforms and a scrap of the rogue arm of the police (SARS) that is currently threatening the sovereignty of the country and the general sanctity of our society.

In the aftermath of the #EndSARS protest in Nigeria, Awosanya was listed as a member of the Lagos State Judiciary Panel of Inquiry by the Lagos State Governor Babajide Sanwo-Olu on police brutality in Lagos State.
