= Disappearance of Azory Gwanda =

2017 missing person case in Tanzania

Azory Gwanda
- Born: ca. 1975; Kibiti, Rufiji District, Pwani Region, Tanzania
- Disappeared: November 21, 2017; Kibiti, Rufiji District, Pwani Region, Tanzania
- Status: Missing for 8 years, 8 months and 15 days
- Occupation: Print/Internet journalist
- Employer(s): Mwananchi Communication Ltd, Mwananchi and The Citizen
- Spouse: Anna Pinoni
- Mother: Eva Mpulumba

The disappearance of Azory Gwanda (born ca. 1975 – disappeared November 21, 2017) is about a Tanzanian journalist for Mwananchi Communications Ltd in Dar es Salaam, Tanzania, who mysteriously disappeared in late 2017 from his home near Kibiti, Rufiji District, Pwani Region, Tanzania.

== Personal ==
Azory Gwanda was 45 at the time of his disappearance. Gwanda had lived on a farm near Kibiti, Tanzania, with his wife Anna Pinoni. His mother, Eva Mpulumba from the Msimba Village in Kigoma Region, lived with the rest of his family, but has been the only relative to be interviewed regarding Gwanda's disappearance.

== Career ==
While working at Mwananchi Communication Ltd as a journalist, Gwanda wrote a series of articles on a string of murders of local government officials and police officers by unidentified assailants on motorcycles. Gwanda was the first journalist to extensively cover these attacks. He wrote for Mwananchi Communications and its publications Mwananchi and The Citizen. He worked from the Kibiti Trading Centre, where he was last seen with unknown men.

== Disappearance ==
Azory Gwanda worked for Mwananchi Communication Ltd in Kibiti, Rufiji District, Pwani Region, Tanzania; shown here in relation to the capital city Dodoma.

Gwanda has not been heard from since his disappearance in November 2017. He was last seen by his wife Ana Pinoni on their farm outside of Kibiti in a Toyota Land Cruiser with unknown men, claiming he was leaving on emergency business while also requesting that she hand over the keys to the house. After Gwanda's departure with the men, Pinoni returned to find the house ransacked, indicating it had been thoroughly searched. Previously, Gwanda had been approached by the strange men at his place of work. They had told him they wanted to speak with him and forced him into the car. Two hours later, Gwanda and the men arrived at his house in Kibiti. Initially, Gwanda's partner was not concerned about his sudden departure, but when he failed to return home or answer calls for two days she went to the local authorities. Mwananchi Communication Limited said it had no information as to where Gwanda had been taken, or why. Although there are small bits of information collected that illustrate the events leading up to the disappearance, no clear evidence has been gathered that may reveal where he is located.

== Aftermath and reactions ==
While little is known about Gwanda's captors, it is assumed that they were tied to the people responsible for the string of murders he was reporting on. This particular criminal case had been ongoing for two years with nearly forty other people being murdered before Gwanda's disappearance. Gwanda's extensive coverage of these attacks may have made him a target. Gwanda was a key asset in understanding the intentions and overall information regarding the murders and as a result of his disappearance, unreported information has been lost.

Gwanda's disappearance has concerned many organizations dedicated to promoting the rights of journalists around the world. Not even a month after the recorded incident, MISA Tanzania released a statement voicing their frustration with the lack of information surrounding Gwanda's condition, and calling attacks on journalists to be "...an attack on press freedom [that] must be condemned". Theophil Makunga, the chairman for the Tanzanian Editors Forum, asserted that "evil intentions" were present in the sudden disappearance of Gwanda. Mwigulu Nchemba, the Home Affairs minister in Tanzania, promised to speak with the heads of the police department about Gwanda. IFEX, another institution devoted to free expression, is concerned that Gwanda's disappearance "may discourage" the work of other journalists pursuing similar investigations. The news company that Gwanda had worked for, Mwananchi Communication Limited, also requested that these types of organizations, as well as the Tanzanian government, intensify the search for information.

In September 2018 Gwanda received the Daudi Mwangosi Award for courage in journalism from the Union of Tanzania Press Club.

In November 2018 two representatives of the Committee to Protect Journalists were detained in Tanzania while studying threats to journalists in the country, including Gwanda's disappearance.

In 2019, Amnesty International reported that Gwanda had been killed.

== See also ==
- Human rights in Tanzania
- List of people who disappeared mysteriously (2000–present)
- Killing of Pelumi Onifade
