= Soro Soke =

Nigerian political slogan coined in 2020

- Origin: Nigerian slang
- Context: Nigerian youth and popular culture
- Coined by: EndSARS protesters
- Meaning: To speak up, especially fearless and boldly

Soro Soke is a political slogan and Internet meme that was used by EndSARS protests. Soro Soke is a Yoruba word meaning speak up.

== History ==
The slogan was first used during the EndSARS protest.

== In popular culture ==
In 2022, Sọ̀rọ̀sókè: an #EndSARS anthology was edited by Jumoke Verissimo and James Yeku, and Soro Soke: The Young Disruptors Of An African MegaCity was authored by Trish Lorenz and published by Cambridge University Press, which sparked criticism when the author claimed to have invented the word Soro Soke.
