= State Criminal Investigation and Intelligence Department =

Investigation Unit in Nigeria Police Force

- Abbreviation: "SCIID"

Jurisdictional structure
- Operations jurisdiction: Nigeria
- Governing body: Nigeria Police Force

Operational structure
- Agency executive: Bolaji Salami

State Criminal Investigation and Intelligence Department (SCIID) is a Nigerian government domestic criminal and intelligence unit of the Nigerian Police Force responsible for investigating crimes and intelligence reports. It is the primary investigating sector of the Nigeria Police Force.

The SCIID is led by Deputy Commissioner of Police Bolaji Salami.

== Overview ==
The SCIID carries out inquiries into diverse range of criminal offences in Nigeria. The police unit is authorized and empowered to carryout investigations, make arrest and prosecute criminals to the full extent of the Law of Nigeria. The unit serves to investigate and prosecute complex crimes in the country. On 9 July 2019, the unit launched its first tech-based interrogation facility. The facility was set up by The Rule of Law and Anti-Corruption (RoLAC), a programme by the European Union.

== Structure ==
They are a total of 8 active sections in the SCIID;

- Administration
- Anti-Fraud Section
- The Central Criminal Registry (CCR)
- Special Anti-Robbery Squad (SARS)
- Special Inquiry Bureau
- Special Fraud Unit (SFU)
- Anti- Kidnapping/ Anti-Cultist
- SIB
