= Emmanuel Onwubiko =

Nigerian journalist

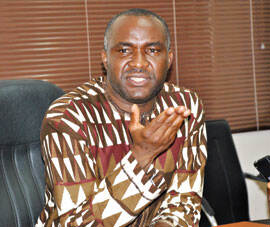
- Born: Emmanuel Nnadozie De Santacruz Onwubiko; Kafanchan, Kaduna, Nigeria
- Occupations: Human rights activist, social media expert, writer

Emmanuel Nnadozie De Santacruz Onwubiko is a Nigerian journalist of over two decades, he worked for seven years as a sole senior Court/judicial reporter in the nation's capital for The Guardian (Nigeria).

He has maintained a consistent weekly column " Rightswatch" in Leadership, a national newspaper based in Abuja. He is a philosopher by professional training; he is a Nigerian Human rights activist, a blogger and a writer. He was a former Federal Commissioner of Nigeria's National Human Rights Commission, an appointment made by the then President Olusegun Obasanjo, and presently he heads the Human Rights Writers' Association of Nigeria (HURIWA). Onwubiko is a publisher, editor-in-chief of Icons of Human Rights monthly newsletter and executive director of ParadiseFound media company limited. Chairman of Epikaya Communications Limited. Board of trustees member of the US-funded NGO called Heartland Alliance Nigeria and board of trustees member of the Association of African Writers on Human and People's Rights. He is also a member of the National Think Tank of the Nigerian Catholic Secretariat in Abuja since 2012.

Onwubiko's undeniable adroitness in advocacy made him to be appointed by the President of Nigeria, Goodluck Jonathan, as a member of the Presidential Committee on Dialogue and Peace in Northern Nigeria (PCCDR). He was given several awards for meritorious achievements.

== Background ==
Onwubiko was born in Kafanchan, Kaduna State. He attended the Teachers College. His tertiary education was at the Catholic Claretian Institute of Philosophy, Maryland, Nekede, Owerri (affiliated to Pontificia Università Urbaniana Rome), where he studied philosophy. He also attended Nigeria Institute of Journalism.

== Career ==
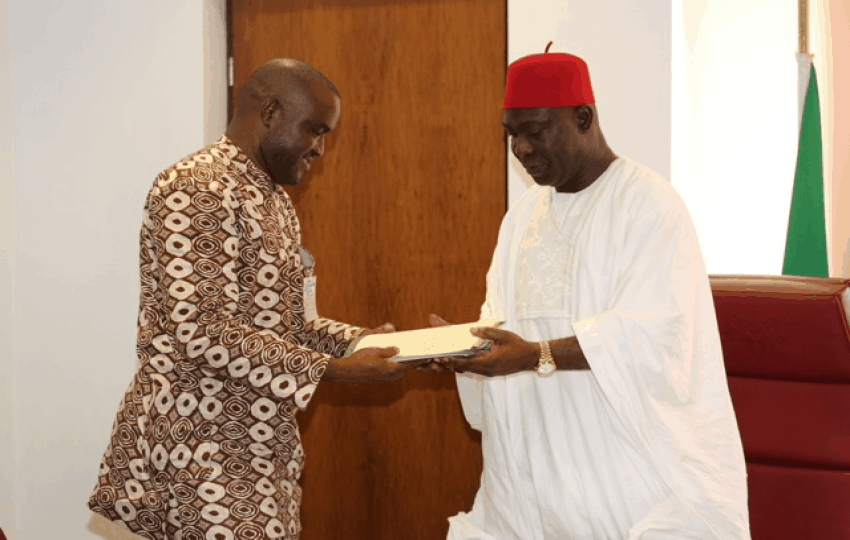
The Guardian and erstwhile Federal Commissioner of the Nigerian National Human Rights Commission [NHRC] Comrade Emmanuel Onwubiko advocacy visit to the Deputy Senate President Senator Ike Ekweremadu

Onwubiko has been speaking on varying national and international issues. He has authored a book titled Politics and Litigation in Contemporary Nigeria, volume one and complete volume, 2003–2005. And he has also authored another new book titled Who Cares About Human Rights?

== Activism ==
After the Governor of Borno State, Alhaji Kashim Shettima, suggested that the armed Islamic insurgents would extend their terror attacks to the southern regions if they were not contained in the northeast, Onwubiko and his group called for the probing of the Governor. This triggered a harsh response by another Northern Civil Organisation group, who accused Onwubiko for giving the terror attack by Islamic Boko Haram a tribal connotation. Onwubiko and his group in their rebuttal insisted that though it has no empirical evidence to link the Borno State governor to the attempted terrorists incursions into the South-East even though it advised politicians to be typically clever and surreptitious with their public statements so as not to provide psychological motivation or instigation for would-be terrorists."

Onwubiko and his group HURIWA had also called on the nation's travellers to withhold their patronage of British Airways and other foreign airlines in view of recent revelations about the airlines' unethical practices, until such concerns are redressed. The group he heads, HURIWA, has more than six thousand media releases on varied thematic issues of human rights.

On 28 April 2016, Onwubiko and the group he leads, Human Rights Writers Association of Nigeria, inaugurated their modest library project named The Professor Chinua Achebe's Human Rights Library in Abuja.

Onwubiko's pro-democracy and non-governmental organisation (NGO), Human Rights Writers Association of Nigeria (HURIWA), on 11 May 2016 petitioned the European Union (EU), Economic Community of West African States (ECOWAS) and foreign embassies over invasion of its office by operatives of the Department of State Services (DSS) what was perceived as attempts by the government to intimidate him and his group over their outspoken stand against the government's suppression of free speech.
