= Ikorodu General Hospital =

General Hospital in Nigeria

Geography
- Location: Ikorodu, South West region, Lagos state, Nigeria

Organisation
- Type: General hospital

Services
- Emergency department: Available

History
- Constructed: 1983

Links
- Website: https://generalhospitalikorodu.org/
- Lists: Hospitals in Nigeria

Ikorodu General Hospital is a public healthcare facility located on TOS Benson Road in Ikorodu, Lagos State, Nigeria. Established in 1983, it provides secondary-level specialist healthcare services to the residents of Ikorodu and its surrounding areas.

== History ==
Ikorodu General Hospital was founded in 1983, and was established to meet the growing healthcare needs of the Ikorodu community. Over the years, the hospital has expanded its services and facilities to accommodate the increasing population and demand for quality healthcare. They have a Maternal and Child Centre (MCC) in Lagos State, donated to improve maternal and child health services.

== CMD ==
The current chief medical director of the general hospital is Dr. Taiwo K. Hassan.

== Community impact ==
Ikorodu General Hospital plays a pivotal role in public health initiatives within the community. It has hosted events such as World Suicide Prevention Day and has implemented electronic medical record systems to enhance patient care.
