= Frank Mba (police officer) =

Nigerian deputy inspector-general of police

DIG Frank Mba

Deputy Inspector General of Police Department of Training and Development
- Incumbent
- Assumed office 20 June 2023 to March 2026

Personal details
- Born: Lagos, Nigeria
- Education: University of Lagos; Nigerian Law School; University of Dundee
- Occupation: Police officer Lawyer

Frank Mba was a Nigerian police officer and lawyer. Who served as the Deputy Inspector General of Nigeria Police in charge of the Department of Training and Development and retired in March 2026 making him a member of the Nigeria Police management team .

== Early life and education ==
Mba was born in Lagos State. He joined the Nigeria Police Force (NPF) in 1992 as a cadet officer and was trained at the Nigeria Police Academy in Kano, where he graduated as the best cadet. He holds a Bachelor of Laws (LLB) degree from the University of Lagos, where he also attended the Nigerian Law School and was called to the Nigerian Bar in 2002. He further pursued a Master’s degree in Law (LLM) at the University of Dundee in Scotland, United Kingdom, graduating with Distinction.

== Career ==
Mba began his policing career as an Inspector and steadily rose through the ranks. In 1999, he was promoted to Assistant Superintendent of Police (ASP), followed by Deputy Superintendent of Police (DSP) in 2003. He was promoted to Superintendent of Police (SP) in 2008, Chief Superintendent of Police (CSP) in 2012, Assistant Commissioner of Police (ACP) in 2014, Deputy Commissioner of Police (DCP) in 2018, and Commissioner of Police (CP) in December 2020. In March 2023, he was decorated as an Assistant Inspector-General of Police (AIG).

Mba is a three-time National Spokesman of the Nigeria Police Force and has received the UN Medal for his service as a member of the Nigeria Police Contingent to the United Nations Mission in Liberia from 2006 to 2007.

== Professional affiliations ==
Mba is a Fellow of the Nigerian Institute of Public Relations (NIPR), the Chattered Institute of Local Government and Public Administration of Nigeria (CILGPAN), and the Chattered Examiners of Criminology and Forensic Investigation Inc., USA (FCECFI). He is also a member of the International Institute of Certified Forensic Investigation Professionals, USA (CFIP), the FBI National Academy Associates Inc. (FBINAA), and The International Emergency Management Society (TIEMS).
