= 2018–2019 Nigerian protests =

Protests in Nigeria

The 2018–2019 Nigerian protests was a series of Shiite-led protests against the discrimination of Shia Muslims in Nigeria in October–November 2018 and July–August 2019. A wave of popular protests, civil violence and Strikes, called by Shiites led to wild fighting between Muslims, Christians and Police. Tens of thousands of protesters marched throughout Shia-majority streets in cities surrounding the capital Lagos. Street protests and growing opposition to president Muhammad Buhari in 2019, as part of the #RevolutionNow movement In July 2019 but however, initial protests began after an organisation's leader was arrested. In October–November, after popular demonstrations and street unrest, police used Live ammunition to disperse the demonstrators, killing 45 demonstrators. Troops was deployed to patrol the streets in case of protests after 3 days of protests. A new wave of protests in July re-ignited into violence as demonstrators marched against Discrimination of Shia Muslims. Tens of thousands rallied in #RevolutionNow rallies throughout Abuja during a week of protests in late-July and early-August 2019. Mass protests were held in Abuja by Muslims against Police brutality acting the movement. The security forces and Riot police forcefully broke up the demands and protests on 5 August.

== See also ==
- Occupy Nigeria
