= Association of Licensed Telecommunications Operators of Nigeria =

The Association of Licensed Telecommunications Operators of Nigeria, also called ALTON, is a non-profit industry association representing licensed telecommunications service providers in Nigeria. It includes major mobile and fixed-line network operators, data and internet service companies, and related infrastructure stakeholders.

== History ==
ALTON was established to dialogue with policymakers and the Nigerian Communications Commission on issues related to service quality, tariffs, infrastructure protection, and matters affecting the telecommunications sector.

In 2019 and 2020, the association supported telcos threatened with service suspension over unpaid USSD charges by banks and later welcomed the introduction of a uniform ₦6.98-per-session end-user billing model under Nigerian Communications Commission and Central Bank of Nigeria directives.

In May 2024, ALTON intervened with Kaduna State authorities to restore operations at seized base stations.
