= Special Anti-Robbery Squad =

Former Nigerian police unit

- Abbreviation: SARS

Agency overview
- Formed: 1992; 34 years ago
- Dissolved: 11 October 2020; 6 years ago

Jurisdictional structure
- Operations jurisdiction: Nigeria
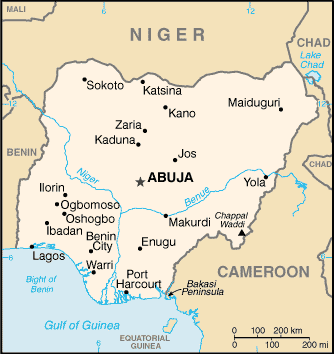
- Nigeria
- Area: 923,768 km^{2}
- Population: 206 million
- Governing body: Ministry of Police Affairs
- Constituting instruments: Section 214 of the 1999 Constitution of the Federal Republic of Nigeria (as amended); Nigeria Police Act 2020
- General nature: Local civilian police

Operational structure
- Headquarters: Louis Edet House, Abuja

Website
- www.npf.gov.ng

The Special Anti-Robbery Squad (SARS) was a unit of the Nigeria Police Force created in late 1992 to deal with crimes associated with robbery, motor vehicle theft, kidnapping, cattle rustling, and firearms. It was part of the Force Criminal Investigation and Intelligence Department (FCIID), headed by the then Deputy Inspector General of Police Anthony Ogbizi.

SARS was controversial for its links to extrajudicial killings, forced disappearances, extortion, torture, framing, blackmail, kidnapping, illegal organ trade, armed robbery, home invasions, rape of men and women, child arrests, the invasion of privacy, and polluting bodies of water with the illegal disposal of human remains. SARS was investigated several times in response to protests, but without results; reforms were promised in 2016, 2017, 2018, and 2019. The unit was disbanded on 11 October 2020 after worldwide protests under the motto "End SARS" occurred.

== History ==
The Special Anti-Robbery Squad (SARS) was founded in late 1992 by former police commissioner Simeon Danladi Midenda. The inciting events that spurred SARS formation were the killing of Colonel Ezra Dindam Rimdan (Nigerian Army) by police officers at a checkpoint in Lagos in September 1992, their arrest, a strike by police officers in response, and a subsequent crime wave. When the information about Rimdan's death and the police's complicity reached the army, soldiers were dispatched into the streets of Lagos in search of any and all police officers. The Nigerian police withdrew from checkpoints, security areas, and other points of interest for criminals; some police officers allegedly resigned while others fled for their lives. Due to the absence of police for two weeks, the crime rate increased. In response, SARS was formed with an initial force of fifteen men and two Peugeot station wagons. Three police anti-robbery squads (the first of which was established in 1984) were already operating at that time, so Midenda needed to distinguish his squad from the existing teams. Midenda named his team the Special Anti-Robbery Squad. After two weeks of dialogue, the Nigerian Army and the Nigeria Police Force came to an understanding, and official police duties resumed in Lagos. In November 1992, the SARS unit was officially commissioned in Lagos.

At the time, SARS was one of the fourteen units in the Force Criminal Investigation and Intelligence Department, and was established to detain, investigate, and prosecute those involved in violent crimes such as armed robbery and kidnapping.

=== Incidents ===
In mid-1996, the SARS Lagos branch arrested two security guards at their place of work under suspicion of assisting in a robbery. The two guards were not charged with a crime when arrested. In January 1997, the bodies of the guards were placed at a morgue without an explanation for their deaths.

In October 2005, a SARS operative killed a bus driver in Obiaruku, Delta State, for failing to pay a bribe. The operative was removed from their SARS position and arrested on charges of murder.

In 2009, after several years of operations, the squad grew in number and strength. Due to the increased presence of internet fraudsters and secret societies in Nigerian universities, SARS operatives infiltrated them and made several successful arrests, but in the process harassed innocent people.

What SARS became was a national scourge that witch-hunt machinery against Nigerian youth with dreadlocks, piercings, cars, expensive phones and risque means of expression.

— Motoani Alake, "#EndSARS: What exactly is the status of SARS?", pulse.ng (23 January 2019)

In May 2010, Amnesty International disclosed that it would be suing the Nigerian Police over human rights abuses, stating that SARS operatives in Borokiri, Port Harcourt, had arrested three bicyclists and detained them for over one week while they were "beaten every night with the butt of a gun and iron belt". On 20 May 2010, a Federal High Court in Enugu State ordered the then-Inspector General of Police Ogbonna Okechukwu Onovo to produce a SARS officer who had shot dead a 15-year-old boy at his high school. According to the SARS officer, the teen was mistaken for a kidnapper. On 27 July 2010, Sahara Reporters published an extensive editorial report detailing how SARS and other police units had made a profit of ₦9.35 billion ($60 million) from roadblocks and extortion within 18 months.

On 3 June 2011, the Nigeria Police Force discovered an attempt by SARS operative Musa Agbu to bomb the Force's headquarters.

Following several reports of human rights violations submitted by members of the public to the office of the Inspector General of Police, on 7 August 2015, the then-Inspector General of Police Solomon Arase announced he would split the SARS unit into two units—an operational unit and an investigations unit—in order to curtail cases of human rights violations. In September 2016, Pulse.ng compiled a report on Nigerian police brutality entitled "Meet SARS, the Police Unit with license to kill", which highlighted the brutality and ignorance of the squad's rules of engagement.

A September 2016 report published by Amnesty International detailed extensive torture and detainment without trial. The report detailed SARS forcing confessions, withholding food, and other abuses.

On 10 August 2019, while SARS operatives were on a raid in Ijegun to arrest kidnappers in the area, several shots were fired in an attempt to subdue the kidnappers; one of these shots hit a pregnant woman who was reportedly killed instantly. An angry mob was said to have lynched two of the officers on the spot.

On 21 August 2019, four SARS operatives were arrested and charged with murder after being caught on film manhandling and then shooting to death two suspected phone thieves in broad daylight. The suspected thieves were shot dead after they had already been arrested.

On 5 September 2019, operatives of the SARS in Lekki, Lagos, allegedly kidnapped, tortured, and robbed Nigerian rapper Ikechukwu Onunaku for no clear reason. According to publications by Punch Nigeria, SARS operatives forced Onunaku to make several ATM withdrawals.

== Modus operandi ==
During its formation, SARS was known to operate covertly. Operatives were not allowed to wear a police uniform or publicly carry guns or walkie-talkies, and were given unmarked vehicles that sometimes had no license plates or private plate numbers during duty.

== Reform and disbanding attempts ==
=== 2017 End SARS Campaign ===
In December 2017, Segun Awosanya spearheaded an online advocacy campaign that demanded an end to SARS brutality in the country. The campaign started on social media from the hashtag #EndSARS, created by Twitter user @Letter_to_jack in a post demanding that the federal government of Nigeria scrap and end the deployment of SARS. The public responded positively to the hashtag, with people all over Nigeria posting about their experiences with SARS. The campaign was reported by international media. By mid December, the campaign took to the streets with protests occurring in Abuja.

The Nigeria Police Force endured backlash over comments made by Public Relations Officer Jimoh Moshood, who accused the campaigners of being "criminals" and "robbers". Moshood also called for the campaigners to come forward so that SARS could investigate them.

During the 8th National Assembly, Nigeria's Senate backed the call for scrapping SARS.

=== Presidential reform attempts ===
On 14 August 2018, the Acting President of Nigeria Yemi Osinbajo ordered with immediate effect the "overhaul" of SARS following reports of human rights violation. The acting president ordered the Inspector General of Police (IGP) Ibrahim Kpotun Idris to reform SARS and carry out an independent investigation after "persistent complaints and reports" concerning human rights violations. After the order, the IGP announced that the unit would be renamed the Federal Special Anti-Robbery Squad, a new head of the unit would be appointed, and the provision of human rights desk officers to check reports.

=== Decentralization ===
On 21 January 2019, IGP Mohammed Adamu ordered the immediate decentralization of SARS. The unit was centralized from the force headquarters in Abuja since its inception; the IGP also stated that the DIG of Force Criminal Investigations Department and Commissioners of Police in each state would be held accountable for actions of the SARS.

=== 2020 End SARS campaign ===
Efforts to ban SARS increased in October 2020 after a SARS police officer shot a young Nigerian man in front of the Wetland Hotel in Ughelli, Delta State. Video of the incident trended on social media, leading to nationwide protests within a few days. The protests quickly expanded from an online hashtag to widespread street protests in days. Popular Nigerian Twitter influencers Rinnu, FK, Kelvin Odanz, Dr. Dipo Awojide, and several others quickly joined in raising awareness of the protests, which gave End SARS protestors added weight and support.

Peaceful #EndSARS protestors in Abuja, the nation's capital, were attacked, beaten, and chased away by federal police officers, but protestors returned as they took the protests to the Police Force Headquarters.

Several reports on international news outlets, including BBC Africa and Al-Jazeera, showed federal police tear-gassing protestors, shooting live ammunition, and using water cannons on them.

On 9 October in Ogbomosho in Oyo State, a protestor named Jimoh Isiaq was shot dead by police officers while participating in the #EndSARS protests. His death at the hands of police officers further increased the anger nationwide as he became a martyr for protesters. Several hashtags, including #EndPoliceBrutality and #RememberJimoh, trended on Twitter. On 10 October, a police station in Ijebu-Ode, South-Western Nigeria, was attacked by protestors angry over the death of Jimoh Isiaq and several others who had died at the hands of the Special Anti-Robbery Squad.

In Lagos, protestors marched to the Lagos State House of Assembly to demand an end to SARS. The following morning, an emergency session of the Lagos House of Assembly was held as lawmakers allowed some protestors into the building to observe proceedings. A motion was passed and agreed on by legislators who voted in favour of the protestors to end the rogue police unit SARS and sent the recommendations of the House to the Federal Government.

On 11 October, the Inspector-General of Police Mohammed Adamu announced the disbandment of SARS on live television and said a new tactical team would be unveiled shortly.

However, protests continued as Nigerians believed the announcement was just "audio talk" (Nigerian slang used to describe something that is said but not implemented). The new hashtags #EndSWAT and #SARSMUSTEND went international as protestors called for the new unit to be scrapped as they thought several members of the defunct SARS would be integrated into the new unit.

Back in Southern Nigeria, the Rivers State government unconstitutionally placed a ban on all forms of protests in the oil-rich state, asking police to arrest any defaulters. However, on 13 October, EndSARS protestors marched in defiance of the ban, all the way up to the State Government House, where the governor resides.

In Kaduna, Northern Nigeria, protestors marched asking for an end to police brutality and the disbandment of SARS. In Abeokuta, Ogun State, and Benin City, Edo State, thousands of Nigerian youths marched in solidarity asking the government to end police brutality. In Benin City, police tear-gassed protestors and arrested some and charged them with treason and attempted murder. However, according to reports on Twitter and media websites, they were later released after the Attorney-General of the State asked the Police Commissioner to let them go, although arrested protestors were asked to come with a surety to sign on their behalf before they would be released.

The End SARS protests were largely decentralized with no actual leaders, though there were protest organizers in several cities who created WhatsApp groups, fundraised, and supplied protestors on the ground with food, medicine, and other supplies. Legal services were acquired and doctors were deployed on ground to administer first aid to protestors. Protestors had access to ambulance services obtained with funds donated by people in Nigeria and abroad including donations via bitcoin and lawyers went from city to city providing arrested protestors with representation and facilitating bails.

As the protests gained more momentum and exposure in Abuja, protestors returned in the thousands to the Police Headquarters and once again were shot at with water cannons and live ammunition.

Popular Twitter activist Aisha Yesufu was reportedly beaten by male police officers, and her car was damaged by police trucks chasing protestors in the streets of Abuja. Politicians and top government officials kept silent including presidential hopeful Bola Tinubu in Lagos, as police officers in Surulere shot and killed several protestors. Several young people were injured and their cars damaged, while others were brutalized by police officers in police stations.

In total, eight people including a 10-year-old boy were killed in Ogbomosho, Oyo State, by police bullets while at least three were shot dead in Lagos—including an auto mechanic who was not part of the protests but was killed by a SARS officer in Lagos.

On 16 October, Twitter CEO Jack Dorsey revealed a new #ENDSARS emoji on Twitter that carries the colors of the Nigerian flag that is added to tweets whenever the hashtag #EndSARS is used as a sign of support for Nigerian protestors. On the same day, after a week and a half of widespread national protests, Vice President Yemi Osinbajo in a series of Twitter posts told Nigerians he chaired a meeting of 36 state governors and the Minister of the FCT to set up judicial panels of inquiry, "so [they] can see justice served, and fast". His statements came as protestors occupied streets and remained defiant until their demands are implemented.

On 18 October 2020, the Nigerian Army announced its annual training exercise "Operation Crocodile Smile VI", a program which included a cyber warfare exercise component that sought to identify, track, and counter "negative comments on social media across the country". The operation also sought to confiscate arms and ammunition that had been used in violent crimes that escalated during the protests.

In the Lekki massacre on the night of 20 October 2020, Nigerian Armed Forces shot at End SARS protesters at the Lekki toll gate in Lagos, Nigeria. The number of casualties is disputed, with witnesses and Amnesty International saying several people were shot dead while Nigerian authorities claim there were no fatalities but that 25 people were wounded.

== Disbandment ==
On 4 October 2020, Muhammed Adamu, inspector general of police (IGP), announced that the Federal Special Anti-Robbery Squad and other tactical squads must stop such operations, including traffic checks, "with immediate effect". On 11 October 2020, Adamu dismantled SARS.

The IGP said that a new unit, called Special Weapons and Tactics (SWAT), would replace SARS. Within hours of the announcement, some Nigerians took to Twitter with the hashtag #EndSWAT, and demonstrations continued amid fears that police reform would not materialize. Protestors' fears were not assuaged by promises of adequate training for SWAT members.

== Aftermath ==
On 15 October 2020, the Federal Executive Council (FEC), headed by Vice President Yemi Osinbajo, met with the governors of Nigeria's thirty-six states and representatives from Nigeria's Human Rights Commission and State Security to address the problems caused by SARS. After the meeting, the NEC directed the governors and the Federal Capital Territory Abuja to set up "judicial panels of inquiry" to investigate the various allegations of human rights violations carried out by SARS operatives. The panels, chaired by retired state judges with members from civil society groups, the Human Rights Commission, Citizens Mediation Centre, and two youth representatives, were directed to receive and investigate all complaints of police brutality including extra-judicial killings by police with the intention to bring justice for such victims and their families. The state governors were also charged with establishing proper oversight over future police activity. Most states moved quickly to set up the SARS investigating panels. However, on 9 November 2020, the police filed a lawsuit claiming that the panels were unconstitutional and illegal, and that state governors had no constitutionally granted powers to oversee the police. On 3 December 2020, the Inspector General of Police (IGP) ordered an investigation into the origins of the police lawsuit. Without explanation, the police withdrew their lawsuit, though there is still a great deal of uncertainty about whether the panels will be truly independent and will be able to fulfill their charge. In November and December 2020, #ENDSARS protestors continued to be harassed by police.

On 22 October 2020, Nigerian President Muhammadu Buhari confirmed in a publicly-aired address that SARS had been dismantled and also accused some members of SARS of committing "acts of excessive force" when the unit was operational. Plans were then put in place to prosecute some former SARS members for extortion, rape, and murder.
