= Primary Health Care and Resource Centre =

The Primary Health Care and Resource Center (PHCRC) is in the rural village of Chapagaun, Lalitpur in Nepal. Chapagaun is in the wider Kathmandu Valley. The health centre was first established in 1972 as a Maternal and Child Health (MCH) clinic by the United Mission to Nepal. It is notable for its international volunteer programme and its micro-insurance service which reduces the cost of health care for those with the insurance.

== History ==
The Primary Health Care and Resource Center was established by the United Mission to Nepal (UMN), a Christian organisation, established in 1954, that aims to encourage "healthy, strong and empowered individuals". In 1984 after 12 years of existence the clinic was upgraded, from an MCH clinic to a health post for the local community. And after another five years the health post was upgraded to a health teaching post.

32 years after beginning the project, in 2004, UMN handed control of the institute to the local government's District Development Committee (DDC) of Lalitpur under the branch of the Village Development Committee (VDC). The centre thereafter has been managed by the local management committee. The organization has been operating the Community Based Health Insurance (CBHI), Community Based School Health Insurance (CBSHI), and Community Based Laborers' Health Insurance (CBLHI) which are the pioneer projects of the organization.

In 1972, the MCH post was the first nutrition rehabilitation centre in Nepal.

In 1974 the PHCRC created Sarbottam Pihto (Super Flour), a flour conceived as a weaning food.

In 1984, a Health Micro-insurance Scheme (HMIS) was introduced. The HMIS was the first in Nepal. In 1995 Mental Health Training for the local police was added to the mental health program. Also of notable interest is PCHRC's use of international medical and lay volunteers. Over 20 years, dozens of volunteers have passed through PHCRC, some clinically trained volunteers worked in OPD and other frontline medical services, whilst lay volunteers helped to build walls and with admin.

== Services ==
In 2005 the health post was renamed Primary Health Care and Resource Center to reflect the fact that it offers more services than a traditional health centre. It provides:

- General outpatient department
- Clinical laboratory
- Pharmacy
- Minor surgical procedures
- In-patient care
- X-ray
- Surgery
- Community oral health services
- Community mental health services
- 24-hour emergency services
- Ambulance service
- Community TB DOTS service
- MCH and RH services
- Birthing center and postnatal observation
- Antenatal and postnatal services
- Family planning services
- Well baby clinic
- Immunization services
- Growth monitoring
- Nutrition education, promotion and rehabilitation service
- Home based nutrition follow-up
- PHCRC based nutrition follow-up
- Super Flour production and promotion
- Community nutrition rehabilitation center

In 2008, the local management committee began managing PHCRC in conjunction with SHANTI NEPAL (INGO).

== See also ==
- SOLID Nepal (1997)
