= Festus Keyamo =

Nigerian lawyer and politician (born 1970)

Festus Keyamo CON, SAN, FCIArb
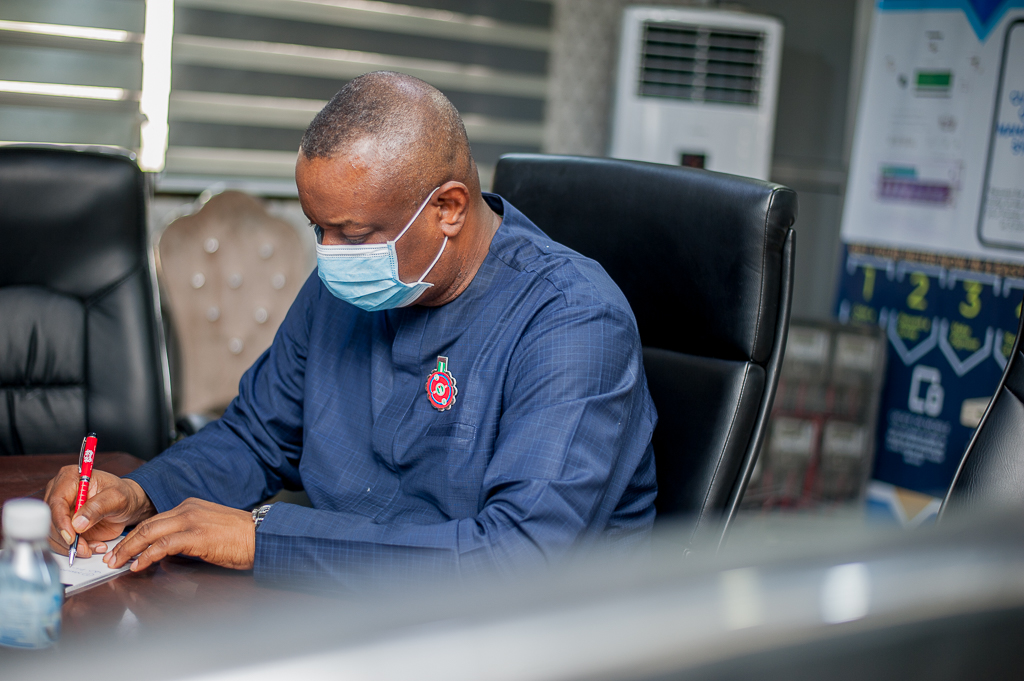
- Keyamo in October 2020

Minister of Aviation and Aerospace Development
- Incumbent
- Assumed office 21 August 2023
- President: Bola Tinubu
- Preceded by: Hadi Sirika

Minister of State for Labour and Employment
- In office 24 September 2019 – 29 May 2023
- President: Muhammadu Buhari
- Minister: Chris Ngige
- Preceded by: Stephen Ocheni
- Succeeded by: Nkiruka Onyejeocha

Personal details
- Born: Festus Egwarewa Keyamo; 21 January 1970 (age 56) Ughelli, Mid-Western State (now Delta State), Nigeria
- Citizenship: Nigeria
- Party: All Progressives Congress
- Occupation: Politician; lawyer; activist
- Known for: Human rights activism

Festus Egwarewa Keyamo CON SAN (born 21 January 1970) is a Nigerian lawyer, columnist and human rights activist who serves as the minister of Aviation and Aerospace Development of Nigeria. In April 2018, Keyamo was appointed as the director of Strategic Communications of the 2019 re-election bid of President Buhari and later appointed minister of State for Labour and Employment.

== Early life and education ==
He was born on 21 January 1970, at Ughelli, a town in Delta State, Southern Nigeria but his father hails from Effurun, a city in Delta. Keyamo had his primary education at Model Primary School and secondary education at Government College, Ughelli, where he obtained the West African School Certificate in 1986. He later proceeded to Ambrose Alli University at Ekpoma, in Edo State southern Nigeria where he received a Bachelor of Law degree in 1992 and was called to the Nigerian Bar in December 1993.

== Legal career ==
He began his legal career in 1993 at Gani Fawehinmi's Chambers in Lagos State, southwestern Nigeria.

After he spent two years at Gani Fawehinmi's chambers, he left to establish Festus Keyamo Chambers.

He was counsel to the leader of the Niger-Delta Peoples' Volunteer Force, Mujahid Dokubo-Asari in his trial for treasonable felony and lead counsel in the treason trial of Ralph Uwazuruike, the leader of the Movement For The Actualization of the Sovereign State of Biafra (MASSOB).

Keyamo was also a counsel in the murder of Bola Ige.

In 2008, he took the Federal Government of Nigeria to court over illegal appointments of service chiefs.

In 2017, Stephanie Otobo, a Canadian-based singer and stripper, accused Apostle Suleman Johnson, through her lawyer Festus Keyamo, of failing to keep a marriage promise made to her after allegedly having several sexual relationships with her.

== Political appointments ==
Festus was among the nominated ministers of the second administration of President Muhammadu Buhari.

After his nomination, he was equally screened by the senate. Until 24 September 2019, Keyamo was appointed Nigeria's Minister of State, for Niger Delta, before he was redeployed to Ministry of Labour and Employment by President Muhammadu Buhari barely a month after his initial appointment on 21 August 2019. Following several calls from some political commentators as to why he didn't make both the first and second ministerial lists, President Bola Ahmed Tinubu forwarded Keyamo's name to the Senate on 4 August 2023 as a ministerial nominee for confirmation.

He was made minister of aviation and aerospace development by President Tinubu on 16 August 2023.

== Awards and recognitions ==
Keyamo was named by the Legal Practitioners’ Privileges Committee (LPPC), Nigeria in July 2017 as one of the outstanding Nigerian lawyers to be awarded the rank of SAN. Festus served in Muhammadu Buhari's cabinet. Keyamo and others named on the 2017 SAN-list were inaugurated into the elevated league of Senior Advocates of Nigeria (SAN) in September 2017. In 2017, Keyamo was also awarded the Global Human Rights Award by the United States Global Leadership Council in Washington for his efforts over the years in respect of protection and promotion of human rights and campaigning for accountable governments in Nigeria. The former president of Nigeria, Muhammadu Buhari awarded Festus Keyamo and 338 others in the national award of 2023.

== See also ==
- List of Nigerian human rights activists
