= Lagos State DNA Forensic Centre =

Forensic laboratory in Nigeria

Lagos State DNA Forensic Centre (LSDFC) is a forensic centre to improve investigations of crime by allowing the Lagos State Government (LSG), South West Nigeria to use DNA analysis. The centre is the first of its kind in West Africa.

== Background ==
LSDFC is a laboratory by the LSG to assist the government in scientific investigation of crime. Before the launching of this centre in Nigeria, DNA profiling was done overseas. The completion of the project will save Nigerian government millions of naira.

== The project ==
The project is Public-Private Partnership, where a private organisation manages the facility for two years and then transfers the facility to the government. On 24 February 2016, the State Attorney General and Commissioner for Justice, Kazeem Adeniji announced that the project will be established to combat crime in the state. The project was commissioned on 27 September 2017.
