= Law enforcement in Nigeria =

Law enforcement in Nigeria is the responsibility of a variety of different agencies at the federal and state level. The Nigeria Police Force is the primary law enforcement agency, with the Economic and Financial Crimes Commission as the main investigative agency, and the State Security Service as the main domestic security agency.

== Government agencies ==
- Ministry of Police Affairs
  - The Nigeria Police Force provide public security functions.
    - Nigerian Mobile Police, paramilitary arm
- Federal Ministry of Interior:
  - Nigerian Correctional Service
  - Nigeria Immigration Service
  - Nigeria Security and Civil Defence Corps
    - Agro Rangers
- Federal Ministry of Justice
  - National Agency for the Prohibition of Trafficking in Persons (NAPTIP), combating human trafficking, enforcing anti-trafficking laws, and rehabilitating victims.
  - National Drug Law Enforcement Agency (NDLEA): The specialized agency responsible for cutting off the supply of illicit drugs, controlling manufacturing, and suppressing drug trafficking.
- State Security Service, the domestic security service.
- Economic and Financial Crimes Commission
  - Nigerian Financial Intelligence Unit
- Federal Road Safety Corps
- Office of the National Security Adviser
  - National Counter-Terrorism Centre

== National and regional paramilitary security outfits ==
- Amotekun
- Nigerian Forest Security Service
- Civilian Joint Task Force
- Enugu State Forest Guard
- Benue Community Volunteer Guards
- Bayelsa Volunteers

== See also ==
- Crime in Nigeria
- Paramilitary forces of Nigeria

== Sources ==
- Alemika, Etannibi E. O.; Chukwuma, Innocent C., eds. (2005). Crime and Policing in Nigeria: Challenges and Options. CLEEN Foundation.
- "Nigeria". INTERPOL.
- Val-Ogu, Genevra (2021). Law Enforcement Agencies and National Development. A Case of the Nigerian Police in the Fourth Republic (1999-2016). GRIN Verlag. ISBN 978-3-346-38271-9.
