= Giwa massacre =

2014 massacre in Nigeria

- Part of the Boko Haram insurgency
- Location: Giwa barracks and surrounding areas of Maiduguri, Borno State, Nigeria
- Date: 14 March 2014
- Target: Escaped detainees from Giwa
- Deaths: 640
- Injuries: Unknown
- Perpetrators: Nigerian Army; Civilian Joint Task Force
- Accused: Gen. Ahmadu Mohammed

The Giwa massacre, also known as the Battle of Giwa, was the assault by Boko Haram militants on the Giwa barracks in Maiduguri, Borno State, Nigeria on 14 March 2014. The battle for the barracks ended in a defeat for Boko Haram, with Nigerian officials saying over 200 militants were killed. Nigerian and CJTF forces massacred over 600 detainees that had escaped from Giwa during the battle in several parts of Maiduguri near the barracks following the battle.

== Background ==
Boko Haram emerged in 2009 as a jihadist social and political movement in a failed rebellion in northeast Nigeria. Throughout the following years, Abubakar Shekau unified militant Islamist groups in the region and continued to foment the rebellion against the Nigerian government, conducting terrorist attacks and bombings in cities and communities across the region. Since the start of 2014, the group had carried out 40 attacks leaving 700 people dead.

The Giwa barracks in Maiduguri had been used as a holding location for suspected Boko Haram militants and other detainees in Borno State since the start of the Boko Haram insurgency several years prior. At least 7,000 people had died at the barracks since 2011 from "appalling" conditions, and over 1,200 had been executed by Nigerian forces without trial between 2012 and 2014 according to Amnesty International. At the time of the Boko Haram attack on 14 March, around 1,600 detainees were present at Giwa, with Maiduguri senator Ahmed Zanna saying that "90 to 95 percent of the detainees were innocent people."

== Battle ==
At 7am on 14 March, the jihadists attacked the residential area of Fauri in Maudiguri, destroying several houses. They then attacked the barracks by throwing explosives into the compound. The militants managed to penetrate the inside, setting fire to several buildings and freeing many prisoners. While the detainees were escaping Giwa, Nigerian planes bombed them, leaving many dead. During the fighting, seven Boko Haram militants were captured and lynched by residents, and others were given to the Nigerian Army. Xinhua reporters stated that five Nigerian soldiers were killed in the battle, and the Nigerian-backed Civilian Joint Task Force counted the bodies of 207 militants. The 207 toll was confirmed by Nigerian officials, who declined to give a casualty report for their own troops.

The assault on the barracks was claimed by Abubakar Shekau on 24 March in a video. Shekau claimed that 2,000 fighters were freed from Giwa during the battle. The Giwa barracks were entirely destroyed during the attack.

== Massacre ==
An Amnesty International report released on 31 March detailed the Nigerian military's crackdown on escaped detainees following the battle. Following the battle, the main hospital in Maiduguri said that close to 1,000 bodies came to the hospital. Later investigations determined that 640 detainees were killed during the massacre, with the victims being referred to as the Giwa 640. Residents had tried to feed and clothe the escaped detainees, but many were re-arrested by Nigerian and CJTF forces.

Many of the detainees were killed in gunfire and bombings while escaping the barracks during the initial onslaught, according to Senator Zanna. Another group of 56 detainees were rounded up by Nigerian forces while screaming "We are not Boko Haram, we are detainees!" and taken to a place called "no-man's land" behind the University of Maiduguri, where they were executed. Another massacre occurred at Jiddari Polo, where one witness said 198 detainees, many too frail to run, were rounded up and killed en masse by soldiers and Civilian Joint Task Force (CJTF) militants. Nigerian forces also killed the remaining detainees at the barracks, leaving an unknown number of people killed. Several mass graves appeared on satellite imagery in the days after the massacre.

Nigerian military spokesman Chris Olukolade denied Nigerian military involvement in the killings, and claimed that the majority of the bodies were that of Boko Haram militants.

== Aftermath ==
In August 2014, a video surfaced of Nigerian forces cutting the throats of re-arrested detainees at Giwa. In many areas of Maiduguri, bullet casings are still strewn across the ground from the battle and the massacre, and children were reported to be playing with them in late 2014.

General Ahmadu Mohammed, who coordinated the massacre of the detainees, was dismissed in 2015 but reinstated in 2016.

== Videography ==
- Rare footage shows Boko Haram attack - BBC News
- EXCLUSIVE VIDEO: Nigerian Army Re-Takes Giwa Barracks Boko Haram had invaded in Maiduguri - Sahara TV (Witness video of the aftermath)
