= Second Battle of Maiduguri (2015) =

- Part of Boko Haram insurgency
Date	1 February 2015
Location	Southern and eastern outskirts of Maiduguri, Borno State, Nigeria
Result	Nigerian victory

Belligerents
Nigeria	Boko Haram

Casualties and losses
Unknown	72-500+ killed
- 10 civilians killed

On 1 February 2015, militants from Boko Haram attacked the town of Maiduguri, Borno State, Nigeria, for the second time since the start of the year and less than a week after a failed assault on the city on 25 January. This assault was again unsuccessful in capturing the city.

== Background ==
Boko Haram emerged in 2009 as a jihadist social and political movement in a failed rebellion in northeast Nigeria. Throughout the following years, Abubakar Shekau unified militant Islamist groups in the region and continued to foment the rebellion against the Nigerian government, conducting terrorist attacks and bombings in cities and communities across the region.

In late 2014, Boko Haram launched an offensive that captured several cities in Borno State, with the jihadists massacring thousands of civilians. Maiduguri, as the capital of Borno, was the most heavily defended city in the state. On 10 January, a Boko Haram suicide bomber killed 19 people in Maiduguri, and a day later three people were killed by a Boko Haram bomber in Yobe State. On 25 January, a Boko Haram assault on the city failed, and hundreds of militants were killed.

== Battle ==
The attack began this time from the south of the city at around 3am on 1 February. Fighting was concentrated in Mulai, about three kilometers from Maiduguri. The attackers failed to reach Maiduguri, and were repelled by Nigerian troops after three hours of fighting. The jihadists then made a second attempt to attack the city from the east, on the road to Dikwa, but were repelled again. The fighting on the road to Dikwa lasted for twelve hours.

After the battle, Nigerian Army spokesman Chris Olukolade said that the jihadists had suffered "massive losses". At least 72 jihadists and ten civilians were killed in the clashes, according to Nigerian newspaper This Day. Xinhua reported that over 500 Boko Haram fighters had been killed, citing a Nigerian security official.
