= Garunda attack =

- Part of Boko Haram insurgency
Date	August 8, 2018
Location	Garunda, Borno State, Nigeria
Result	ISWAP victory

Belligerents
Nigeria	ISWAP

Casualties and losses
17 killed 14 injured Several missing	Unknown

On August 8, 2018, militants from the Islamic State – West Africa Province (ISWAP) attacked Nigerian soldiers building a base at Garunda, Borno State, killing 17 soldiers.

== Background ==
Boko Haram emerged in 2009 as a jihadist social and political movement in a failed rebellion in northeast Nigeria. Throughout the following years, Abubakar Shekau unified militant Islamist groups in the region and continued to foment the rebellion against the Nigerian government, conducting terrorist attacks and bombings in cities and communities across the region. On 7 March 2015, the group publicly declared allegiance to the Islamic State and became known as the Islamic State – West Africa Province (ISWAP).

ISWAP by late 2016 was relegated to an insurgency, but in late 2017 starting with the Magumeri ambush began attacking Nigerian army bases in rural areas of Borno State. In June 2018, the group attacked Gajiram and killed 45 Nigerian soldiers and civilians. A few days later, they attacked Balagallaye and Jilli and killed over 100 more soldiers.

== Attack ==
On the evening of August 8, several dozen ISWAP fighters arrived by truck to the village of Garunda, and attacked the Nigerian base in the town. The Garunda base had just been establlished after the battle of Jilli, and survivors of the Jilli attack were to resume duties at Garunda. When the attack on Garunda began, the soldiers were setting up camp and a bulldozer was still digging trenches. The base was overrun in the middle of the night and the soldiers fled. The ISWAP fighters looted weapons and vehicles at the camp.

The Nigerian government did not public speak about the attack, but a Nigerian officer told AFP on August 9 that 17 soldiers were killed, 14 were injured, and several were still missing.
