= Order of precedence in Nigeria =

Relative preeminence of officials for ceremonial purposes

The order of precedence for public ceremonies in Nigeria is established by the "Act for the Order of Precedence of Public Officers and Other Related Matters", passed into law on 26 September 2001 by the Senate of Nigeria.

== Order of precedence ==
| Rank | Public Officers and Other Persons Included |
|---|---|
| 1 | President of Nigeria |
| 2 | Vice President of Nigeria |
| 3 | President of the Senate |
| 4 | Speaker of the House of Representatives |
| 5 | Chief Justice of Nigeria |
| 6 | Former Presidents of Nigeria |
| 7 | Former Vice Presidents of Nigeria |
| 8 | Deputy President of the Nigerian Senate |
| 9 | Deputy Speaker of the House of Representatives of Nigeria |
| 10 | Senators and Members of House of Representatives |
| 11 | Governors of the States |
| 12 | President of the Nigerian courts of appeal and Justices of the Supreme Court of Nigeria |
| 13 | Ministers in the Federal Executive Councik |
| 14 | Deputy Governors |
| 15 | Ministers of State |
| 16 | Ambassadors of Foreign Nations |
| 17 | Former Presidents of the Senate |
| 17 | Former Speakers of the House of Representatives |
| 17 | Former Deputy Presidents of the Nigerian Senate |
| 17 | Former Deputy Speakers of the House of Representatives |
| 17 | Former Chief Justices of Nigeria |
| 17 | Former Members of the National Assembly |
| 17 | Former Governors |
| 18 | Former Deputy Governors |
| 19 | Special Advisers |
| 20 | Secretary to the Government of the Federation |
| 21 | Head of the Civil Service of the Federation |
| 21 | Speakers of the State Houses of Assembly |
| 21 | Clerk of the National Assembly |
| 21 | Chief Registrar of the Supreme Court |
| 22 | Governor of the Central Bank of Nigeria |
| 22 | Service Chiefs of the Nigerian Armed Forces (Chief of Defence Staff, Chief of Army Staff, Chief of the Air Staff, Chief of the Naval Staff) |
| 23 | Inspector General of Police |
| 24 | Justices of the Court of Appeal |
| 25 | Chief Judge of the Federal High Court of Nigeria |
| 25 | Chief Judges of States |
| 25 | Chief Judge of the FCT High Court |
| 25 | Grand Kadi and President of the Customary Court of Appeal |
| 26 | Nigerian traditional rulers (by status) |
| 27 | Judges of the Federal High Court, State High Courts and the FCT High Court |
| 27 | Kadis of the Sharia Court of Appeal of the FCT |
| 27 | Judges of the Customary Court of Appeal of the FCT |
| 28 | Chairman of the Federal Civil Service Commission |
| 28 | Chairman of the Independent National Electoral Commission |
| 28 | Chairman of the National Population Commission |
| 28 | Chairman of the Police Service Commission |
| 28 | Chairman of the Federal Character Commission |
| 28 | Chairmen of other statutory Commissions |
| 29 | Auditor General for the Federation |
| 29 | Accountant-General of the Federation |
| 30 | Clerk of the Senate |
| 30 | Clerk of the House of Representatives |
| 30 | Federal Permanent secretaries |
| 30 | Deputy Inspector-General of Police |
| 30 | Heads of Paramilitary forces of Nigeria |
| 30 | Special Assistants to the President |
| 30 | Bishops and Imams |
| 31 | Members of Houses of assembly of Nigerian states |
| 32 | Chairmen of Local government areas of Nigeria |
| 33 | Commissioners in State Executive Councils |
| 34 | Any other category of officers in the public services |
