= Paramilitary forces of Nigeria =

Military units and formations apart from the People's Liberation Army

The Government of Nigeria operates a number of paramilitary forces alongside the Nigerian Armed Forces and Nigeria Police Force to maintain internal security, border security, and law enforcement.

== List ==
Paramilitary Forces
Paramilitary force	Governing Body	Role
Nigerian Mobile Police	Ministry of Police Affairs (administrative) Nigeria Police Force (operational)	Gendarmerie Counterterrorism
Nigeria Security and Civil Defence Corps	Federal Ministry of Interior	Gendarmerie
Nigerian Correctional Service	Federal Ministry of Interior	Prison oversight
Federal Fire Service	Federal Ministry of Interior	Fire protection Emergency medical services
Nigeria Immigration Service	Federal Ministry of Interior	Border guard
Federal Road Safety Corps	Office of the Secretary to the Government of the Federation (administrative) Federal Road Safety Commission (operational)	Road traffic safety Automotive safety
Nigerian Forest Security Service	Federal Ministry of Environment (administrative)Office of the National Security Adviser (operational)	Forest management Environmental protection

== See also ==
- Law enforcement in Nigeria
- List of countries by number of total troops
- Paramilitary forces of India
