= Battle of Monguno (2015) =

- Part of Boko Haram insurgency
Date	15–16 February 2015
Location	Monguno, Borno State, Nigeria
Result	Nigerian victory
Territorial changes	Monguno recaptured by Nigeria

Belligerents
Nigeria; Civilian Joint Task Force	Boko Haram

Casualties and losses
2 killed 10 injured	300+ killed (per Nigeria)

Between 15 and 16 February 2015, Nigerian soldiers recaptured the town of Monguno, Borno State, Nigeria from Boko Haram militants, leaving over 300 militants dead. Boko Haram had captured Monguno several weeks prior.

== Background ==
Boko Haram emerged in 2009 as a jihadist social and political movement in a failed rebellion in northeast Nigeria. Throughout the following years, Abubakar Shekau unified militant Islamist groups in the region and continued to foment the rebellion against the Nigerian government, conducting terrorist attacks and bombings in cities and communities across the region.

On 25 January, Boko Haram attacked the cities of Monguno and Maiduguri. The attack on Maiduguri failed, along with a follow-up attack in early February, leaving hundreds of militnts dead in both battles. Many residents of Monguno fled to Maiduguri after the fall of the city to Boko Haram.

== Battle ==
Nigerian soldiers and pro-government militiamen from the Civilian Joint Task Force (CJTF) attacked the city of Monguno on 15 February. Nigerian forces launched airstrikes on the town, and military spokesman Chris Olukolade said that lots of supplies destined for Boko Haram militants in Baga were intercepted. Olukolade said that along with Monguno, ten other smaller villages near the city were recaptured.

At least 300 militants were killed in the battle, according to the Nigerian government. Two soldiers were killed, and ten more were injured.
