= Political violence in Nigeria =

In the context of the history of Nigeria, political violence is defined as violence which the state or a non-state actor perpetrates in order to achieve political goals. Political violence has occurred throughout Nigerian history—from the 1960 independence from British rule to terrorist attacks.

== List of incidents ==
- Boko Haram insurgency

== See also ==
- Crime in Nigeria
- Human rights in Nigeria
- Politics of Nigeria
- Religious violence in Nigeria

== Sources ==
- Falola, Toyin (24 June 2021). Understanding Modern Nigeria: Ethnicity, Democracy, and Development. Cambridge University Press. doi:10.1017/9781108936866.018. ISBN 978-1-108-93686-6.
- Okonkwo, Nkiruka Stella; Akanji, Tajudeen Ademola (2025). "Political Violence in Nigeria: Examining Dynamics, Impacts, and Sociopolitical Realities". Journal of World Affairs: Voice of the Global South. 1 (3): 346–364. doi:10.1177/29769442251383267. ISSN 2976-9442.
