= Battle of Jilli =

- Part of Boko Haram insurgency
Date	July 14, 2018
Location	Jilli, Yobe State, Nigeria
Result	ISWAP victory

Belligerents
Nigeria; Civilian Joint Task Force	ISWAP

Strength
730	Several hundred

Casualties and losses
33-100+ killed <500 missing	Unknown

On July 14, 2018, the Islamic State – West Africa Province (ISWAP) attacked a Nigerian army base in Jilli, Borno State, Nigeria, killing between 31 and 100 soldiers, with up to 500 more missing.

== Background ==
Boko Haram emerged in 2009 as a jihadist social and political movement in a failed rebellion in northeast Nigeria. Throughout the following years, Abubakar Shekau unified militant Islamist groups in the region and continued to foment the rebellion against the Nigerian government, conducting terrorist attacks and bombings in cities and communities across the region. On 7 March 2015, the group publicly declared allegiance to the Islamic State and became known as the Islamic State – West Africa Province (ISWAP).

ISWAP by late 2016 was relegated to an insurgency, but in late 2017 starting with the Magumeri ambush began attacking Nigerian army bases in rural areas of Borno State. In June 2018, the group attacked Gajiram and killed 45 Nigerian soldiers and civilians. A few days later, they attacked Balagallaye and killed dozens more soldiers.

== Battle ==
The base at Jilli was defended by 730 soldiers in the 81st Division. Most of the soldiers at the base in Jilli had just been redeployed to the north from other areas in Nigeria. The soldiers at the base had received prior information that the jihadists were going to attack it, and the soldiers had called for reinforcements that did not arrive. On July 14, at about 7:30pm, several armored vehicles carrying Nigerian flags and with soldiers dressed in Nigerian uniforms pulled up to the base. The soldiers at the base, believing they were their compatriots, let the vehicles in. The jihadists were actually of Abu Musab al-Barnawi's faction of ISWAP, who had come from Lake Chad and staged the attack in Gubio. The jihadists were able to seize the base quickly, with fighting ending at 9:10pm. The Nigerian Army commander managed to escape with 63 of his men to Geidam.

The Islamic State claimed responsibility for the attack on Jilli and Gudumbali in a video on January 15, 2019. In the video, a foreign figher in ISWAP (likely from Libya) appeared briefly alongside the jihadists in Jilli.

== Aftermath ==
Nigerian officials did not release casualty numbers after the attack, although AFP said that at least 33 soldiers were killed, including three officers and two Civilian Joint Task Force militiamen, while 24 wounded soldiers were evacuated to a hospital. Reuters reported in September that at least 100 soldiers were killed at Jilli. Other sources reported that up to 500 soldiers were still missing by October.
