= Battle of Bama (2015) =

- Part of Boko Haram insurgency
Date	10–14 March 2015
Location	Bama, Borno State, Nigeria
Result	Nigerian victory: 90% of Bama destroyed
Territorial changes	Nigerian forces recapture Bama and surrounding villages

Belligerents
Nigeria: 7th Division; Civilian Joint Task Force; White mercenaries	Boko Haram

Casualties and losses
2+ killed	Unknown
- Dozens of civilians killed 7,500 displaced

Between 10 and 14 March 2015, Nigerian soldiers and allied mercenaries and militias captured the town of Bama, which had been held by Boko Haram since September 2014, in the 2015 West African offensive.

== Background ==
Boko Haram emerged in 2009 as a jihadist social and political movement in a failed rebellion in northeast Nigeria. Throughout the following years, Abubakar Shekau unified militant Islamist groups in the region and continued to foment the rebellion against the Nigerian government, conducting terrorist attacks and bombings in cities and communities across the region.

Prior to the battle in 2014, Bama had a population of 270,000. Men caught fleeing the Boko Haram capture in September 2014 were rounded up and executed on the spot. Survivors of the battle who remained in the city told Amnesty International that Boko Haram fighters searched for men that had been part of the pro-government Civilian Joint Task Force (CJTF) militias, and often detained and tortured men suspected of being CJTF without evidence. One fighter told a civilian that "when they see people from Maiduguri, Gwoza, and Bama, [we] would kill them."

Three previous Nigerian attempts to attack Bama had failed. One soldier told Voice of America that the soldiers often shot indiscriminately into the treetops because of the sheer amount of Boko Haram snipers hiding in the trees to ambush the soldiers. Land mines and other explosives scuttled previous attempts as well.

== Battle ==
The Nigerian offensive, led by the 7th Division, on Bama began on 10 March. The offensive on Bama came amid similar offensives in Nigeria by the Nigerian government and allies; by 10 March, Chadian forces had recaptured Dikwa and Nigerien forces in the middle of fighting for Damasak. The Nigerian troops pushed southward from Mafa, and met up with Cameroonian troops headed north. On the day of the attack on 10 March, Nigerian forces departed from Konduga towards Bama. Two days later, the Nigerian Army released a statement saying that they had captured the city.

This statement was denied by Bama residents and fighters, who said that the city was burned down by Boko Haram fighters until they fled on 14 March. The Nigerian soldiers were fighting alongside pro-government militiamen from the Civilian Joint Task Force, and conducted aerial bombings of the city during the battle. Other foreign mercenaries were present during the battle; two white mercenaries, one South African and one Ukrainian, were killed in a friendly-fire incident on 10 March. The Nigerian government also denied reports of South African mercenaries fighting at Bama. The Nigerians and allied forces encountered resistance in the villages of Boboshe and Yale, but pushed through.

On 14 March, as Nigerian forces were closing in on Bama, Boko Haram militants warned residents to evacuate their homes before the militants set them on fire. Elderly and sick civilians who couldn't flee along with Boko Haram were burned in their homes.

About 7,500 residents of Bama fled during the battle, and in the following days set up a makeshift encampment in the forest outside Maiduguri. At least 90% of Bama was destroyed during the battle, including the emir's palace which was used as a Boko Haram headquarters. Many women who were forced into marriage with Boko Haram fighters during the seven-month control of the city were summarily executed before the fighters fled. The militants were allegedly afraid of being separated from their wives and did not want them to remarry a non-Muslim. It is not known how many people were killed in the massacres, but execution sites were visible across the city as well as bodies. The fighters then fled towards Gwoza.

== Gallery ==
- See the Nigerian Town Freed By Boko Haram - Olivier Laurent in TIME. 2015
- The War Against Boko Haram (part 3) - VICE NEWS. 2015
