= Battle of Bulanbuli =

- Part of Boko Haram insurgency
| Date | 24–25 April 2014 |
| Location | near Bulanbuli, Borno State, Nigeria |
| Result | Nigerian victory |

Belligerents
| Nigeria; Self-defense militias | Boko Haram |

Casualties and losses
| 4 killed 9 injured | 40 killed |

Between 24 and 25 April 2014, Nigerian forces ambushed Boko Haram militants near Bulanbuli, killing over 40 militants.

== Background ==
Boko Haram emerged in 2009 as a jihadist social and political movement in a failed rebellion in northeast Nigeria. Throughout the following years, Abubakar Shekau unified militant Islamist groups in the region and continued to foment the rebellion against the Nigerian government, conducting terrorist attacks and bombings in cities and communities across the region. Since the start of 2014, the group had carried out 40 attacks leaving 700 people dead.

On 7 April 2014, Boko Haram attacked the town of Chibok, abducting 276 schoolgirls and fleeing to their base in the Sambisa Forest. The kidnapping put the years-long insurgency on the world map for the first time, and spurred international efforts to combat Boko Haram.

== Battle ==
Clashes erupted on the night of 24 August into 25 August near Bulanbuli, between the town of Alagarno and the Sambisa Forest. Nigerian defense spokesman Chris Olukolade said that the "capture of terrorists believed to be the leaders of the men operating around Alagarno triggered a large-scale clash in Bulanbuli." Nigerian officials said that 40 militants were killed, along with four soldiers killed and nine injured. Several jihadists were also taken prisoner.

On the same day of the battle, self-defense militias carried out patrols in the Sambisa Forest. Residents of Bulanbuli claimed to have heard at least thirty explosions coming from the forest. Witness testimonies reported by RFI said that a minibus may have taken some of the kidnapped Chibok girls from the forest to the Cameroonian border.
