= Tiger Base =

Anti-Kidnapping Unit of the Imo State Police Command

Tiger Base is the operational name of the Anti-Kidnapping Unit of the Imo State Police Command, a tactical formation of the Nigeria Police Force based in Owerri, Imo State, Nigeria. It is mandated by the police authorities to combat kidnapping, armed robbery, cultism and other violent crimes in the state.

The unit has also attracted sustained public scrutiny and media attention over allegations of human rights abuses.

== Operations ==
According to official police statements, Tiger Base is tasked with investigating and responding to cases of kidnapping, armed robbery, cult-related violence and similar serious offences. The unit conducts tactical operations aimed at arresting suspects and rescuing victims in Imo State.

Tiger Base operates from facilities in Owerri, the capital of Imo State, in south-eastern Nigeria. It forms part of the broader structure of the Imo State Police Command, reporting to the Commissioner of Police and ultimately to the national leadership of the Nigeria Police Force.

== Human rights controversy ==
Tiger Base has drawn sustained attention from Nigerian and international media, civil society groups and human rights advocates, who have raised concerns over alleged torture, unlawful detention, extrajudicial killings and other abuses linked to the unit. Some organisations have called for investigations or for the unit to be disbanded, citing testimonies from former detainees and relatives of suspects.

The Imo State Police Command has repeatedly denied these as false and unfounded.
