= Battle of Zari (2018) =

2018 battle in Borno State, Nigeria

- Part of Boko Haram insurgency
Date	August 30, 2018
Location	Zari, Borno State, Nigeria
Result	Indecisive: ISWAP inflicts heavy losses, but is forced to retreat

Belligerents
Nigeria	ISWAP

Strength
Unknown	75+

Casualties and losses
48 killed 20 wounded	Unknown

On August 30, 2018, militants from the Islamic State – West Africa Province attacked a Nigerian military base at Zari, Borno State, Nigeria, killing 48 soldiers.

== Background ==
Boko Haram emerged in 2009 as a jihadist social and political movement in a failed rebellion in northeast Nigeria. Throughout the following years, Abubakar Shekau unified militant Islamist groups in the region and continued to foment the rebellion against the Nigerian government, conducting terrorist attacks and bombings in cities and communities across the region. On 7 March 2015, the group publicly declared allegiance to the Islamic State and became known as the Islamic State – West Africa Province (ISWAP).

ISWAP by late 2016 was relegated to an insurgency, but in late 2017 starting with the Magumeri ambush began attacking Nigerian army bases in rural areas of Borno State. In June 2018, the group attacked Gajiram and killed 45 Nigerian soldiers and civilians. A few days later, they attacked Balagallaye, Garunda, and Jilli and killed over 100 more soldiers.

== Battle ==
At the time of the battle, the base at Zari was defended by soldiers in the 145th Battalion. At about 4pm local time on August 30, a large number of jihadists with vehicles stolen during previous attacks arrived at the base. Fighting lasted for about an hour. The Nigerian army intervened with at least one J-7 jet and one Mi-35M helicopter. The helicopters reportedly killed three jihadist leaders, although the aircraft did not carry out any strikes in fear of hitting their own troops. Overpowered on the ground, the Nigerian troops temporarily retreated from the base until ground and air reinforcements arrived.

The attack was claimed the following day in a short statement published by ISWAP. On September 8, ISWAP published a video of the attack, showing 75 of its fighters dressed in uniforms along with the bodies of Nigerian soldiers, some of whom were shot at close range.

== Aftermath ==
According to an anonymous Nigerian officer to AFP, at least 30 soldiers were killed in the attack. Another military source told AFP a similar toll, although the second source said that many jihadists were killed in a bombing. ISWAP's video shows 15 bodies of Nigerian soldiers.

Following sweeping operations by the Nigerian army conducted after the battle, the death toll was revised upwards. On September 3, a Nigerian soldier anonymously told AFP that 48 bodies had been discovered, and 20 soldiers were wounded. The Nigerian government released a statement on September 1 claiming to have killed several jihadists and destroyed two pick-ups.
