= Balagallaye ambush =

- Part of Boko Haram insurgency
Date	July 13, 2018
Location	Near Balagallaye, Borno State, Nigeria
Result	JAS victory

Belligerents
Nigeria	Jama'atu Ahlus Sunna

Strength
11 vehicles	~100 fighters

Casualties and losses
23 killed or missing	Unknown

On July 13, 2018, Jama'atu Ahlus Sunna (JAS) ambushed Nigerian troops near the village of Balagallaye, Borno State, Nigeria, killing 23 soldiers.

== Background ==
Boko Haram emerged in 2009 as a jihadist social and political movement in a failed rebellion in northeast Nigeria. Throughout the following years, Abubakar Shekau unified militant Islamist groups in the region and continued to foment the rebellion against the Nigerian government, conducting terrorist attacks and bombings in cities and communities across the region. On 7 March 2015, the group publicly declared allegiance to the Islamic State and became known as the Islamic State – West Africa Province (ISWAP).

ISWAP by late 2016 was relegated to an insurgency, but in late 2017 starting with the Magumeri ambush began attacking Nigerian army bases in rural areas of Borno State. In June 2018, the group attacked Gajiram and killed 45 Nigerian soldiers and civilians. Balagallaye in particular is close to the Sambisa Forest, a hub of JAS activity led by Abubakar Shekau.

== Ambush ==
On July 13, Nigerian soldiers were alerted to a gathering of around 100 jihadists near Boboshe, not far from the Sambisa forest. A group of soldiers in eleven vehicles headed out to confront them, but the vehicles got bogged in the mud as it was the middle of the rainy season. While stuck near the village of Balagallaye, the JAS fighters ambushed the soldiers. Initial reports by Nigerian officials said that 23 soldiers were missing in the ambush. Five of the victims were officers. Only three of the eleven vehicles returned to Bama. Another source close to pro-government militias said that several dozen soldiers were killed. The militia source said that it was not known how many were entirely killed, captured, or fled into the bush.

By mid-August 2018, the soldiers were still missing.
