= 2018 Gajiram attack =

2018 terrorist attack in Nigeria

- Part of Boko Haram insurgency
Date	18 June 2018
Location	Gajiram, Borno State, Nigeria
Result	ISWAP victory

Belligerents
Nigeria	ISWAP

Strength
Unknown	11 vehicles

Casualties and losses
45 killed	10+ killed

On 18 June 2018, ISWAP militants attacked a Nigerian base at Gajiram, Borno State, Nigeria, killing up to 45 soldiers.

== Background ==
Boko Haram emerged in 2009 as a jihadist social and political movement in a failed rebellion in northeast Nigeria. Throughout the following years, Abubakar Shekau unified militant Islamist groups in the region and continued to foment the rebellion against the Nigerian government, conducting terrorist attacks and bombings in cities and communities across the region. On 7 March 2015, the group publicly declared allegiance to the Islamic State and became known as the Islamic State – West Africa Province (ISWAP).

ISWAP by late 2016 was relegated to an insurgency, but in late 2017 starting with the Magumeri ambush began attacking Nigerian army bases in rural areas of Borno State. In February 2018, the group attacked Gajiram and killed seven Nigerian soldiers, with three jihadists dying in the confrontation.

== Attack ==
At about 5:40pm on 18 June, ISWAP fighters attacked the base at Gajiram with eleven vehicles. The spokesman for the Borno police, Edet Okon, said that the attack was repelled by Nigerian soldiers and policemen. Okon claimed that there were no casualties among Nigerian police, although did not give a casualty toll for the military. AFP said that nine soldiers were killed, and that Gajiram residents saw the bodies of ten jihadists be loaded into pick-up trucks, although exact death tolls are not known. In September 2018, Reuters published a report saying that 45 soldiers and policemen were killed at Gajiram, and the soldiers at the camp were fatigued and ill-equipped.
