= Amotekun =

Security outfit in South Western, Nigeria

Western Nigeria Security Network
- Active: January 9, 2020; 6 years ago
- Country: Nigeria
- Type: Gendarmerie
- Role: Internal Security in the South Western region; Special operations support
- Size: 10,000
- Headquarters: Ibadan, Oyo State, Nigeria
- Nickname: Amotekun
- Website: https://www.amotekunekiti.org/joining/

The Western Nigeria Security Network (WNSN), codenamed Operation Amotekun (Yoruba for "Leopard" or "Cheetah") and simply known as the Amotekun, is a security outfit based in all six states of South Western Nigeria responsible for curbing insecurity in the region. It was founded on 9 January 2020 in Ibadan, Oyo State, Nigeria as the first regional security outfit initiated by a geopolitical zone in Nigeria.

== History ==
Amotekun is a Yoruba word that means "One that looks like a leopard," leopard being translated to "ekun." Because of this, Amotekun properly means cheetah, but as in this case, it is often mistransliterated to leopard. Operation Amotekun (Leopard) was established on 9 January 2020 by the six state governors of all the South Western states of Nigeria, namely; Lagos State, Oyo State, Ogun State, Ondo State, Osun State and Ekiti State. The establishment of the security outfit was subject to the decision by all the six state governors at the regional security summit held in Ibadan, Oyo State, Nigeria in June 2019 through Development Agenda for Western Nigeria Commission (DAWN). In support of the outfit, all the six state governors contributed 20 vehicles each, except Oyo that contributed 33 vehicles, in order to assist the operatives in carrying out their duties, making a total of 133 vehicles for the startup, they also procured 100 units of motorcycles each, making a total of 600 motorcycles. The members of the outfit were drawn from local hunters, the Oodua Peoples Congress (OPC), Agbekoya, Nigeria Security and Civil Defence Corps (NSCDC) and vigilante group.

== Operation ==
The operatives of the security outfit will assist police, other security agencies and traditional rulers in combating terrorism, banditry, armed robbery, kidnapping and also help in settling herdsmen and farmers contentions in the region. For the startup, Lagos, Osun and Ekiti states, recruited 1,320 operatives for the operation, while they will carry dane guns like local hunters, operating in about 52 deadly blackspots all over the southwest region.

== Controversy ==
On 13 January 2020, the Nigeria police warned that they will arrest any operative of the outfit that carries illegal arms.

On 14 January 2020, the Federal government of Nigeria declared Operation Amotekun as an illegal operation, stating that it is not backed by the Nigerian constitution.

On 23 January 2020, the vice president of Nigeria, Yemi Osinbajo, met with the six state governors of the south western Nigeria and they all agreed to work together towards the progress of Operation Amotekun.

== See also ==
- Nigeria Police Force
- Nigeria Security and Civil Defence Corps (NSCDC)
- Nigerian Hunter & Forest Security Service (NHFSS)
- Civilian Joint Task Force (CJTF)
- Eastern Security Network
