= Nigeria Security and Civil Defence Corps =

Nigerian paramilitary agency

- Active: May 1967 – present
- Country: Nigeria
- Allegiance: Nigerian government
- Type: Gendarmerie
- Role: Internal security; Special operations support
- Size: 80,000
- Part of: Federal Ministry of Interior
- Garrison/HQ: Abuja, Nigeria

The Nigeria Security and Civil Defence Corps (NSCDC) is a gendarmerie and paramilitary force in Nigeria, established in 1967 and formally recognized by an Act of Parliament in 2003. The Corps is tasked with protecting lives and properties in partnership with the Nigeria Police Force, as well as safeguarding critical national infrastructure. The NSCDC plays a vital role in crisis management, disaster response, and security enforcement.

It is also involved in intelligence gathering, combating vandalism, illegal bunkering, pipeline protection, and ensuring the safety of citizens. The NSCDC conducts operations across the country and works closely with other law enforcement agencies to maintain peace and order.

== Duties ==
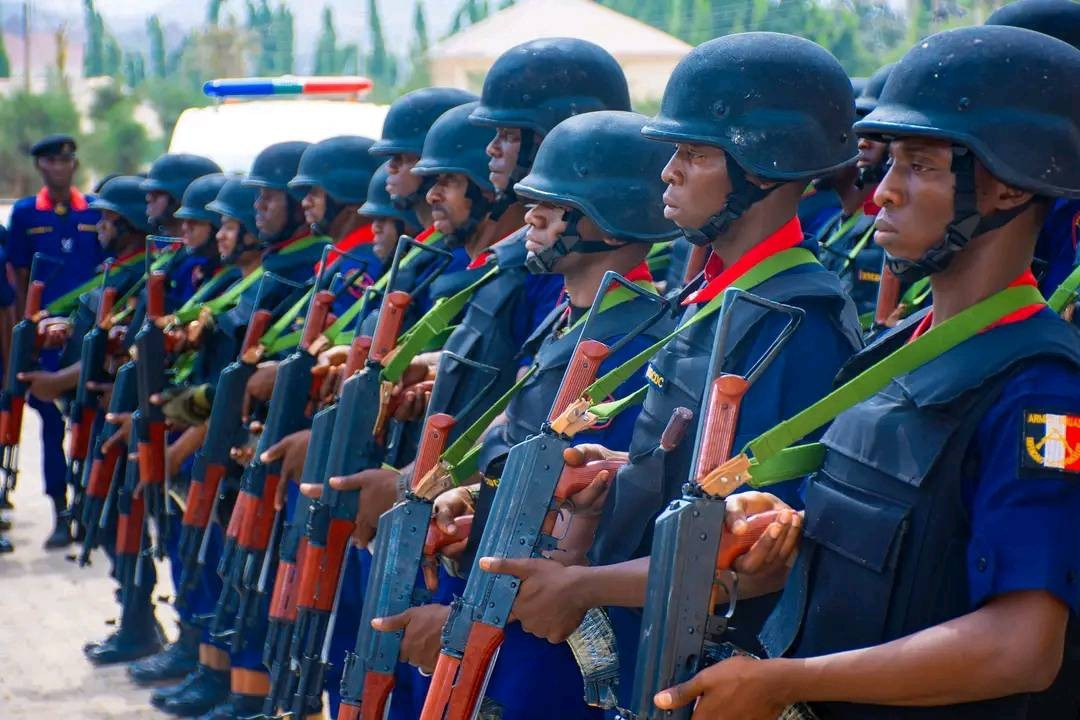
Members of the Civil Defence Corps in 2024

The primary function of the NSCDC is to protect lives and properties. One of the crucial function of the Corps is to protect pipelines from vandalism. The agency is also involved in crisis resolutions.

Many states now recognise the impact of the Nigeria Security and Civil Defence Corps with continuous collaboration to ensure maximum security.

=== Powers ===
The Corps is empowered to institute legal proceedings of the Attorney General in accordance with the provisions of the constitution against any person or persons suspected to have committed an offence, maintain an armed squad in order to bear fire arms among others to strengthen the corps in the discharge of its statutory duties.

== History ==
=== Origins ===
The NSCDC was first introduced in May 1967 during the Nigerian Civil War within the then Federal Capital Territory of Lagos for the purpose of sensitization and protection of the civil populace. It was then known as Lagos Civil Defence Committee.

It later metamorphosed into the present day NSCDC in 1970. On inception, the Corps had the objective of carrying out some educational and enlightenment campaigns in and around the Federal Capital of Lagos to sensitize members of the civil populace on enemy attacks and how to save themselves from danger as most Nigerians living in and around Lagos territory then had little or no knowledge about war and its implications. Members of the Committee deemed it important to educate through electronic and print media on how to guide themselves during air raids, bomb attacks, identify bombs and how to dive into trenches during bomb blast.

In 1984, the Corps was transformed into a National security outfit and in 1988, there was a major re-structuring of the Corps that led to the establishment of Commands throughout the Federation, including Abuja, and the addition of special functions by the Federal Government.

=== Statutory backing ===
On 28 June 2003, an act to give statutory backing to the NSCDC passed by the National Assembly was signed into law by President Olusegun Obasanjo. The act was amended in 2007 to enhance the statutory duties of the corp.

=== Agro Rangers ===
In 2016, by the request of the Federal Ministry of Agriculture and Rural Development, the NSCDC created the Agro Rangers, a force dedicated to protecting farmers from the herder–farmer conflict and Boko Haram Insurgency. As of August 2024, this force has 10,000 rangers across all 36 states and the Federal Capital Territory.

== Organization structure ==
- Commandant General's Office

=== Directorates ===
- Directorate of Administration
- Directorate of Disaster Management
- Directorate of Intelligence and Investigation
- Directorate of Operations
- Directorate of Technical Service
- Directorate of Critical Infrastructure and National Assets

=== Zones ===
- Zone A
  - Lagos State Command
- Zone B
  - Kaduna State Command
  - Kano State Command
  - Katsina State Command
  - Jigawa State Command
- Zone C
- Zone D
  - Niger State Command
  - Zamfara State Command
  - Sokoto State Command
  - Kebbi State Command
  - Kwara State Command
- Zone E
  - Imo State Command
  - Abia State Command
  - Akwa Ibom Command
  - Cross River State Command
  - Ebonyi State Command
  - Enugu State Command
  - Rivers State Command
- Zone F
  - Ogun State Command
  - Osun State Command
  - Ekiti State Command
  - Ondo State Command
  - Oyo State Command
- Zone G
  - Edo State Command
  - Anambra State Command
  - Delta State Command
  - Bayelsa State Command
- Zone H
  - Benue State Command
  - Nassarawa State Command
  - Plateau State Command
  - Taraba State Command
  - Kogi State Command

=== Institutions ===
- Civil Defence Academy, Sauka
- College of Peace and Disaster Management, Katsina
- College of Security Management, Ogun State

== Commandant-General ==
The Commandant-General is the professional head of the NSCDC. The title has existed since 2004. The role is held by an existing officer of the Corps who has been appointed by the Federal Government of Nigeria, and who is assisted by a Deputy Commandant General and an Assistant Commandant General.

=== List of Commandants-General ===
- Abiola Aturamu (2004–2005)
- Adewale John Abolurin (2005–2015)
- Abdullahi Gana Mahammadu (2015 – February 2021)
- Ahmed Abubakar Audi (since February 2021)

== Ranks ==
Officers

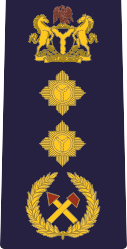
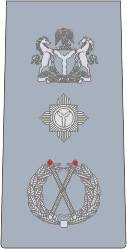
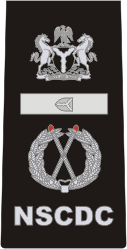
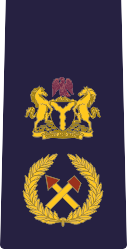
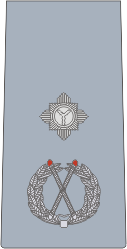
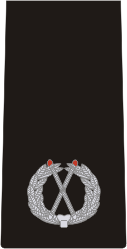
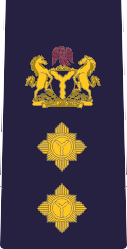
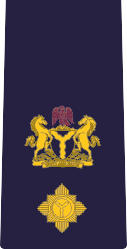
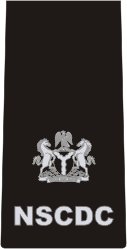
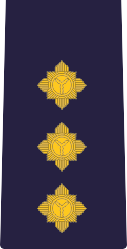
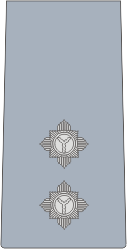
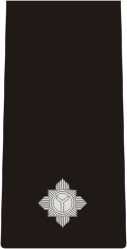
| Rank group | Commandant cadre | | | | | | Superintendent cadre |
|---|---|---|---|---|---|---|---|---|---|---|---|---|
| Nigeria SCDC |
| Nigeria SCDC | Commandant General | Deputy Commandant General | Assistant Commandant General | Commandant | Deputy Commandant | Assistant Commandant | Senior Superintendent | Chief Superintendent | Superintendent | Deputy Superintendent | Assistant Superintendent I | Assistant Superintendent II |

Other ranks

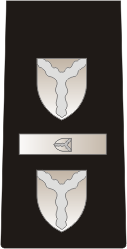
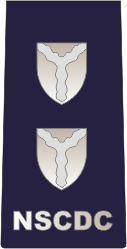
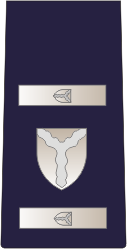
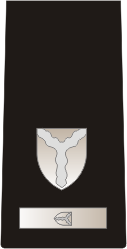
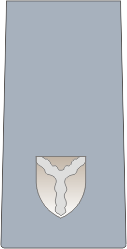
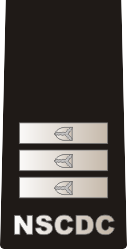
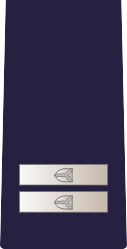
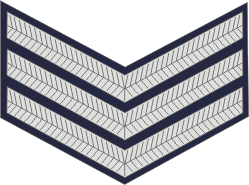
| Rank group | Inspector cadre | | | | | | | Assistant cadre |
|---|---|---|---|---|---|---|---|---|---|---|
| Nigeria SCDC | | | | | | | | | | No insignia |
| Nigeria SCDC | Chief Inspector | Deputy Chief Inspector | Assistant Chief Inspector | Principal Inspector | Senior Inspector | Inspector | Assistant Inspector | Corps Assistant I | Corps Assistant II | Corps Assistant III |

== See also ==
- Nigeria Police Force (NPF)
- Nigerian Hunter & Forest Security Service (NHFSS)
- Civilian Joint Task Force (CJTF)
- Amotekun
- National Guard of Russia
- Internal Troops
- National Gendarmerie
- Civil Guard (Spain)
- People's Armed Police
