= First Battle of Maiduguri (2015) =

Attack in Borno State, Nigeria

- Part of Boko Haram insurgency
Date	25 January 2015
Location	Maiduguri, Borno State, Nigeria
Result	Nigerian government victory

Belligerents
Nigeria; Civilian Joint Task Force	Boko Haram

Casualties and losses
Several dozen killed	53-200+ killed

On 25 January 2015, militants from Boko Haram attacked the city of Maiduguri, the capital of northeast Nigeria's Borno State. Several dozen Nigerian soldiers and up to 200 militants were killed, and Nigerian soldiers retained control of Maiduguri. The battle occurred at the same time as a Boko Haram offensive on Monguno, which was successful.

== Background ==
Boko Haram emerged in 2009 as a jihadist social and political movement in a failed rebellion in northeast Nigeria. Throughout the following years, Abubakar Shekau unified militant Islamist groups in the region and continued to foment the rebellion against the Nigerian government, conducting terrorist attacks and bombings in cities and communities across the region.

In late 2014, Boko Haram launched an offensive that captured several cities in Borno State, with the jihadists massacring thousands of civilians. Maiduguri, as the capital of Borno, was the most heavily defended city in the state. On January 10, a Boko Haram suicide bomber killed 19 people in Maiduguri, and a day later three people were killed by a Boko Haram bomber in Yobe State.

== Battle ==
Boko Haram militants launched their offensive on Maiduguri at dawn on January 25, just several hours after Nigerian President Goodluck Jonathan hosted a rally in the city. Fighting began between 2:00am and 5:00am in the suburb of Njimtilo and further north in the city of Monguno. The Nigerian Air Force retaliated and carried out at least one bombing raid during the fighting. Pro-government Civilian Joint Task Force (CJTF) militiamen set up roadblocks and checkpoints to prevent further Boko Haram incursions into the city.

A curfew was declared early in the morning and civilians were barred from entering or exiting, save for civilians being evacuated from areas under attack. The jihadists were eventually defeated and forced to return to Mainok and Auno. While the Maiduguri attack was repelled, Monguno fell to Boko Haram. 5,000 refugees from Monguno reached Maiduguri on January 26.

Although the defense of Maiduguri was successful, the capture of Monguno only further encircled the city by Boko Haram. After the attack, only the road between Maiduguri and Damaturu was under Nigerian control.

== Aftermath ==
Although the defense of Maiduguri was successful, the capture of Monguno only further encircled the city by Boko Haram. After the attack, only the road between Maiduguri and Damaturu was under Nigerian control. The day after the battle, RFI's correspondent in Maiduguri said that he saw over 100 bodies at the Maiduguri hospital morgue. Most of the dead were young men, some children. The majority were Boko Haram fighters. A Nigerian security agency said that at least 53 jihadists were killed in the battle, although witnesses reported at least 200 soldiers and fighters were killed.
