= Crime in Nigeria =

- Homicide: 15.7 (2023)
- Assault: 9.1 (2013)
- Burglary: 1.4 (2013)
- Theft: 13.3 (2013)
- Rape: 0.4 (2013)
- Sexual violence: 1.0 (2013)
- reported per 100,000 inhabitants

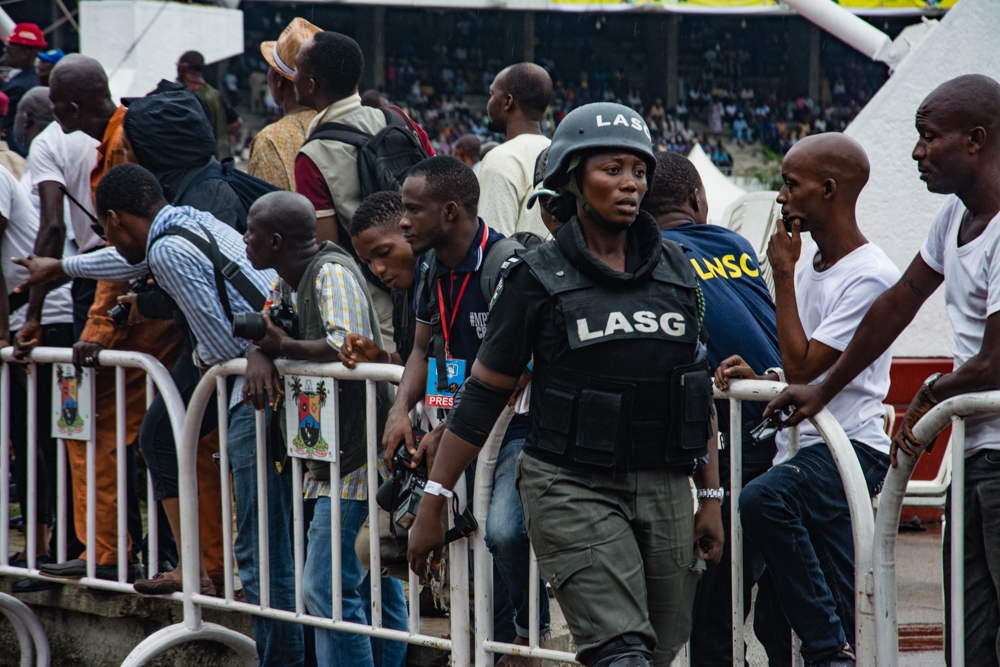
A Nigerian police officer at the Eyo festival in Lagos

== Land-Based Crimes ==
Crime in Nigeria is investigated by the Nigerian Police. Nigeria is considered to be a country with a high level of crime, ranking 19th among the least peaceful countries in the world. During the first half of 2022, almost 6,000 people were killed by jihadists, kidnappers, bandits or the Nigerian army.

=== Crime by type ===
==== Child sexual abuse ====
According to UNICEF in 2014, 25% of women were sexually abused before age 18 and 11% of men were sexually abused before age 18.

==== Corruption ====
In 2011, it was estimated that Nigeria had lost over $400 billion to political corruption since independence.

Nigeria’s president-elect bought a $11 million London mansion that his predecessor’s government was seeking to confiscate as part of a probe into one of the biggest corruption scandals in the West African nation’s history.

==== Domestic violence ====
A 2012 study found that 31% of Nigerian women had been victims of domestic violence. Nigerian perceptions of domestic violence vary based on region, religion, and class. For example, the Tiv people view wife-beating as a "sign of love" that should be encouraged as evidenced with the statement "If you are not yet beaten by your husband then you do not know the joy of marriage and that means you are not yet married".

All the major ethnic groups, especially Yoruba and Igbo, have strong patriarchial societal structures that lead to the justification of domestic violence.

==== Human trafficking ====
Nigeria is a source, transit, and destination country for women and children subjected to trafficking, including forced labour and forced prostitution. Trafficked Nigerian women and children are recruited from rural areas within Nigeria - women and girls for involuntary domestic servitude and sexual exploitation, and boys for forced labour in street vending, domestic servitude, mining, and begging.

Nigerian women and children are taken from Nigeria to other West and Central African countries, primarily Gabon, Cameroon, Ghana, Chad, Benin, Togo, Niger, Burkina Faso, and the Gambia, for the same purposes. Children from West African states like Benin, Togo, and Ghana – where Economic Community of West African States (ECOWAS) rules allow for easy entry – are also forced to work in Nigeria, and some are subjected to hazardous jobs in Nigeria's granite mines. Nigerian women and girls are taken to Europe, especially to Italy and Russia, and to the Middle East and North Africa, for forced prostitution.

==== Murder ====
Nigeria had a murder rate of 9.85 per 100,000 population in 2015. In 2016, the homicide rate per 100,000 inhabitants was 34.5. In Nigeria murder/homicide rate per 100k population as at 2019 was 21.74, a 35.3% decline from 2016.

==== Organised crime ====
Nigeria is home to a substantial network of organised crime, active especially in drug trafficking, shipping heroin from Asian countries to Europe and America; and cocaine from South America to Europe and South Africa.

Criminal organisations in Nigeria typically do not follow the mafia-type model used elsewhere. They appear to be less formal and more organised along familial and ethnic lines, thus making them less susceptible to infiltration by law enforcement. Police investigations are further hampered by the fact there are at least 250 distinct ethnic languages in Nigeria.

Area boys are loosely organised gangs of street children and teenagers, composed mostly of males, who roam the streets of Lagos, Lagos State in Nigeria. They extort money from passers-by, public transporters and traders, sell illegal drugs, act as informal security guards, and perform other "odd jobs" in return for compensation.

==== Terrorism ====
Jihadist group Boko Haram began an insurgency in July 2009, which peaked in the mid-2010s. Centred on Maiduguri, Borno State, they have killed carried out many attacks in Nigeria, Niger, Cameroon and Chad. They have carried out many kidnappings, bombings and massacres - killing tens of thousands of people.

In September 2019, Islamic State of Iraq and the Levant stated that it killed 14 Nigerian soldiers in Borno. Later in September 2019, militants in northeastern Nigeria killed at least nine people in an attack. A day later, ISIL claimed responsibility for the attack.

In January 2021, a separatist insurgency in the country's southeast began.

==== Confraternities ====
Various Nigerian confraternities or student "campus cults" are active in both organised crime and political violence as well as providing a network of corruption within Nigeria. As confraternities have extensive connections with political and military figures, they offer excellent alumni networking opportunities. The Supreme Vikings Confraternity, for example, boasts that twelve members of the Rivers State House of Assembly are cult members. In lower levels of society, there are the "area boys", organised gangs mostly active in Lagos who specialise in a mugging and small-scale drug dealing. Gang violence in Lagos resulted in 273 civilians and 84 policemen being killed from August 2000 to May 2001.

== IUU Fishing and Other Blue Crimes ==
=== Blue Crimes in the GoG and the Niger Delta ===
Nigeria borders the Gulf of Guinea (GoG). Considering its rich and biodiverse fisheries and other natural resources as well as commercial shipping lines, it is of geostrategic relevance. In recent years, it has become a hot spot for various blue crimes. The GoG is therefore referred to as “the new danger zone”. Nigeria is one of the most affected countries in the area. The Niger Delta is seen as “the epicentre of violence from which criminality and violence is radiating to Nigeria’s neighbours”.

==== IUU Fishing ====
Nigeria's Exclusive Economic Zone (EEZ), like the rest of the GoG, is subject to IUU fishing. While the latter is also conducted by artisanal fisherfolk using illegal fishing equipment, venturing into restricted waters, or cooperating with industrial IUU fishing vessels, most IUU fishing in the GoG can be traced back to foreign industrial fishing fleets. Several countries such as China, Russia, and European Union (EU) member states deploy Distant Water Fishing (DWF) fleets to the Gulf of Guinea. Chinese DWFs, which account for 75% of fishing off the coast of West Africa, are reported to fish with bottom trawlers, in restricted areas, and without license, misreport catch and manipulate Automatic Identification System (AIS) data, bypass local law by flagging their ships in African nations, and rent smaller, unrestricted boats of neighboring countries Chinese DWFs. They, thereby, exploit the region's EEZs, including Nigeria's. Moreover, DWF fleets by EU countries are among the IUU perpetrators in Nigerian waters. They are also criticized for applying their Common Fisheries Policy (CFP) for sustainable fisheries selectively and opportunistically in the GoG.

==== Other Blue Crimes ====
The GoG also experiences piracy and armed robbery. The Niger Delta is the most affected area in the GoG. Most of the incidents in the GoG can be classified as armed robbery because they are usually conducted in territorial waters. Often, ships are attacked close to the ports of Lagos, Warry, Calabar and Port Harcourt. The main target for organized criminal groups are oil tankers. While piracy and armed robbery attempts have decreased in recent years – 2023 only one attack in Nigerian waters was reported – the violence by pirate groups transferred to coastal communities.

Moreover, the Niger Delta experiences pipeline vandalism with the intent of stealing and selling the crude oil or of industrial and governmental sabotage.

Criminal actors also engage in various forms of illegal trafficking at sea: Human trafficking and forced labor are also present in the GoG and often linked to IUU fishing vessels. Large amounts of drugs on their way from mainly South America to, among others, Europe pass through the Nigerian ports. Drug trafficking has connections to other blue crimes such as piracy, and arms smuggling. Arms are smuggled on IUU vessels.

=== Root Causes and Impact on Nigeria ===
In the Niger Delta, state fragility, criminality, and violence reinforce themselves. High levels of corruption, weak governance, and conflicts within Nigeria contribute to low coastal welfare and the proliferation of blue crimes.

IUU fishing is, moreover, rooted in the growing demand for fisheries worldwide, the profitability of IUU fishing, and being less powerful than the DWF nations. Nigeria's reliance on foreign direct investment through DWFs, and subsidies for DWFs by their home countries allow the latter to fish in the region with little regard to sustainability. The fishing pressures and other economic problems such as unemployment because of the oil industry, and inequality between the poorer communities on the coast and the more economic secure land-locked communities also lead to artisanal fisherfolk taking up criminal activities. That way blue crimes such as IUU fishing can acts as “incubators of maritime piracy and sea robbery”. The latter are also rooted in the oil industry and the ease of attacking container ships.

The blue crimes present a threat to the security and stability of the Nigerian state as well as human security. The GoG has become “one of the most dangerous and unstable [spaces] in the world.” The safety of seafarers and fisherfolk is at risk. Pirates attacking oil tankers are highly violent. Artisanal fisherfolk also put themselves at risk of accidents with oil installations by going into previously avoided areas to find fishing grounds. Pipeline vandalism threatens lives because of accidental fires. IUU fishing pushes women that can no longer work as fishmongers into sex work, risking their health. Furthermore, arm smuggling leads to a high number of weapons entering Nigeria possibly contributing to violence on land.

Moreover, the blue crimes negatively affect the economies of the littoral states: Pipeline vandalism negatively impacts Nigeria's GDP and foreign exchange earnings. Piracy and armed robbery can lead to ships avoiding Nigerian waters threatening the fishery sector and job opportunities. Nigeria's fisheries are experiencing high pressures bringing them to the risk of collapse. IUU costs the country up to hundreds millions of dollars, partly because of IUU fishing not generating taxes. The fishing activities of foreign vessels, moreover, negatively impact coastal communities. IUU fishing acts as an unfair competitor in that regard leading to unemployment, and price distortion. Coastal communities, which are dependent on fish, experience food and economic insecurity.

IUU fishing, furthermore, leads to an unsustainable exploitation of resources, which harms the marine ecosystems, including their fish stocks, and coral reefs. Oil spills as a result of pipeline vandalism also lead to environmental damage. Lastly, IUU fishing by Nigerian artisanal fisherfolk in neighboring territorial waters of Cameroon could lead to conflicts between the states. A study on incarcerations found that the majority of inmates identified as Christian and mostly Protestant followed by Muslims.

=== Nigeria's Efforts Against Blue Crimes ===
The navy is the basis for Nigeria's efforts against maritime threats. In recent years, Nigeria improved concerning fleet modernization, personnel training, Maritime Domain Awareness (MDA) infrastructure acquisition, information sharing, and joint maritime patrols and law enforcement at sea. Furthermore, Nigeria conducted various operations against piracy, armed sea robbery, crude oil theft, and other blue crimes such as Operation River Dominance, Operation Prosperity, and Operation Dakatar Da abrewo. Nigeria also cooperates with Private Maritime Security Companies (PMSC) in establishing a Secure Anchorage Area (SAA) since 2013 and to function as coast guard patrols. The involvement of PMSCs is however, criticized, for leading to more maritime insecurity and corruption. Despite being the best equipped and relatively active in addressing maritime insecurity in the GoG, Nigeria, lacking capacities and adequate regulation, being underfunded and understaffed, and hindered by problematic bureaucracy, struggles to fulfill coast guard functions, patrol the country's EEZ, and address the whole range of blue crimes at the same time. Nigeria's efforts are also assessed as neglecting root causes.

Nigeria is part of various regional organizations such as the Gulf of Guinea Commission (GGC) since its foundation in 2001, which solely addresses the maritime domain, the Economic Community of West African States (ECOWAS) with its ECOWAS Integrated Maritime Strategy (EMIS), the Maritime Organization for West and Central Africa (MOWCA), which unsuccessfully established a coast guard network with the International Maritime Organization (IMO), and the Fisheries Committee for the West Central Gulf of Guinea (FCWC), which works towards sustainable fisheries and against IUU fishing. In cooperation with the latter and Trygg Mat, Nigeria is part of the West Africa Task Force which has a higher success rate than other initiatives. Moreover, Nigeria and other states from the FCWC established a Regional Monitoring, Control and Surveillance Center (RMCSC) that monitors fishing. The country is a signatory to the Code of Conduct Concerning the Repression of Piracy, Armed Robbery against Ships, and Illicit Maritime Activity in West and Central Africa (Yaoundé Code of Conduct). The latter outlined responsibilities and a maritime security architecture. Nigeria's legislative framework does, however, not align with the Yaoundé Conduct because it lacks a comprehensive approach. The various regional initiatives aim at facilitating coordination and consultation among the member states, unified enforcement and capacity building, information sharing and resource pooling. Despite progress, problems in the form of lacking monitoring and enforcement capabilities, funding, and harmonization as well as a member states being unwilling to commit and tackle root causes obstruct their implementation. Their efforts are further hampered by a lack of unity between the member states: Other member states distrust Nigeria.

Besides the national and regional efforts by Nigeria, there are international initiatives concerning blue crimes in the GoG, such as the United Nations Security Council (UNSC) resolutions 2018 in 2011 and 2039 in 2012. Concerning Maritime Security, Nigeria also cooperates with the EU, which has formulated the Strategy on the Gulf of Guinea in 2014 and an Action Plan in 2015. The EU relying among others on naval forces and Coordinated Maritime Presence (CMP) in cooperation with the Yaoundé architecture, inter alia, seeks to improve the capacities, the rule of law, and regional cooperation, as well as build resilient communities against crimes. The EU, moreover, funds the RMCSC. These efforts, however, face challenges in the form of insufficient coordination, leading to duplication and fragmentation, as well as a lack of local ownership leading to self-serving engagements and enhanced maritime insecurity. Apart from the Yaoundé Code of Conduct, the maritime security initiatives, such as in the case of Nigeria's 2019 Maritime Offences Act and the UNSC resolutions, moreover, often display a focus on piracy and armed robbery at sea, while lacking a comprehensive approach that includes root causes.

== See also ==
- Law enforcement in Nigeria
