= Agro Rangers =

Gendarmerie unit in Nigeria

The Agro Rangers (Note: Variations on capitalisation and inclusion of hyphen are sometimes used.) are a unit of the Nigeria Security and Civil Defence Corps (NSCDC) formed in 2019 in response to the Nigerian herder–farmer conflict and Boko Haram insurgency. Its first deployment saw it act as defence units in Borno State, though it has expanded to a force of 10,000 rangers across all 36 Nigerian states (according to the NSCDC) and the Federal Capital Territory and primarily performs operations guarding farms and farmers, from raids, kidnappings, and cattle rustling.

== History ==
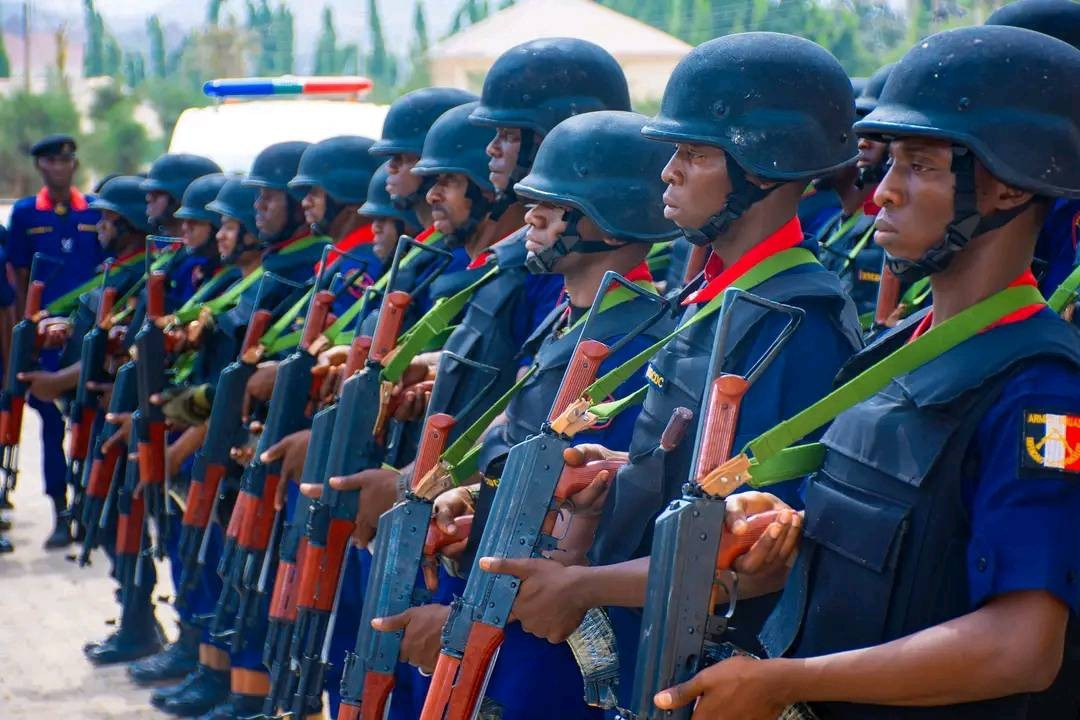
Members of the Civil Defence Corps, of which the Agro Rangers are a part, in 2024

The Agro Rangers were created in 2016 by the request of the Federal Ministry of Agriculture and Rural Development, which sought greater protection for farmers in the Nigerian agro industry. Then-Minister of Agriculture and Rural Development Audu Ogbeh asked for 2,500 such rangers. The first unit was created in Borno State and had 3,000 rangers, drawn mostly from existing NSCDC forces. Borno has been the main center of Boko Haram operations and continues to be a central deployment of the Agro Rangers. Former Vice President Yemi Osinbajo announced in 2017 that Agro Rangers were able to protect ranch operations from cattle rustlers upon request from the rancher. Further Agro Ranger units was inaugurated in September 2019, with 1,000 rangers ready for deployment to Plateau State, with 1,000 more in training. That same month, Agro Rangers were deployed to the Federal Capital Territory and Niger State. In October 2019, the NSCDC announced 313 more rangers would be committed to Nasarawa State with the goal of combatting farm attacks and cattle rustlings. That same month, Agro Rangers were deployed to Yobe State. In October 2020, illegal grazing activities were dispersed by the Agro Rangers in Oyo State.

In 2020, the NSCDC announced that D'banj would serve as the Agro Rangers' brand ambassador.

In 2018, a training program was announced for the Agro Rangers in conjunction with the U.S. National Guard.

In March 2025, the government announced its intention to recruit another 10,000 Agro Rangers, which would add to the 10,000 rangers already serving.

== Efficacy and criticism ==
Residents in Borno have reported insufficient protection from militant attacks, and fled threatened areas regardless of existing Agro Ranger presence. For this reason, the Nigerian government and the NSCDC have sought to expand the Agro Ranger program, an issue which Bola Tinubu campaigned on before his 2023 election, in which Tinubu won Borno State.

Although the NSCDC has claimed that the Agro Rangers are deployed in all states in Nigeria, CrossRiverWatch could not confirm a deployment in Ondo State, with interviewed locals having not seen any Agro Rangers, while attacks continue.

Professor Clement Adebooye, Benue State assemblyman Terna-Kester Kyenge, and former federal legislator Junaid Muhammed have expressed skepticism of the Agro Rangers ability to combat the threats faced by farmers.
