= Nigerian Forest Security Service =

- Abbreviation: NFSS

Agency overview
- Formed: 2021
- Employees: 50,000 +

Jurisdictional structure
- Operations jurisdiction: Nigeria
- Primary governing body: Office of the National Security Adviser
- Secondary governing body: Department of State Services

Operational structure
- Headquarters: Abuja
- Agency executive: Wole Joshua Osatimehin, Commander General
- Parent agency: Ministry of Environment

Website
- https://nhfss.org.ng/

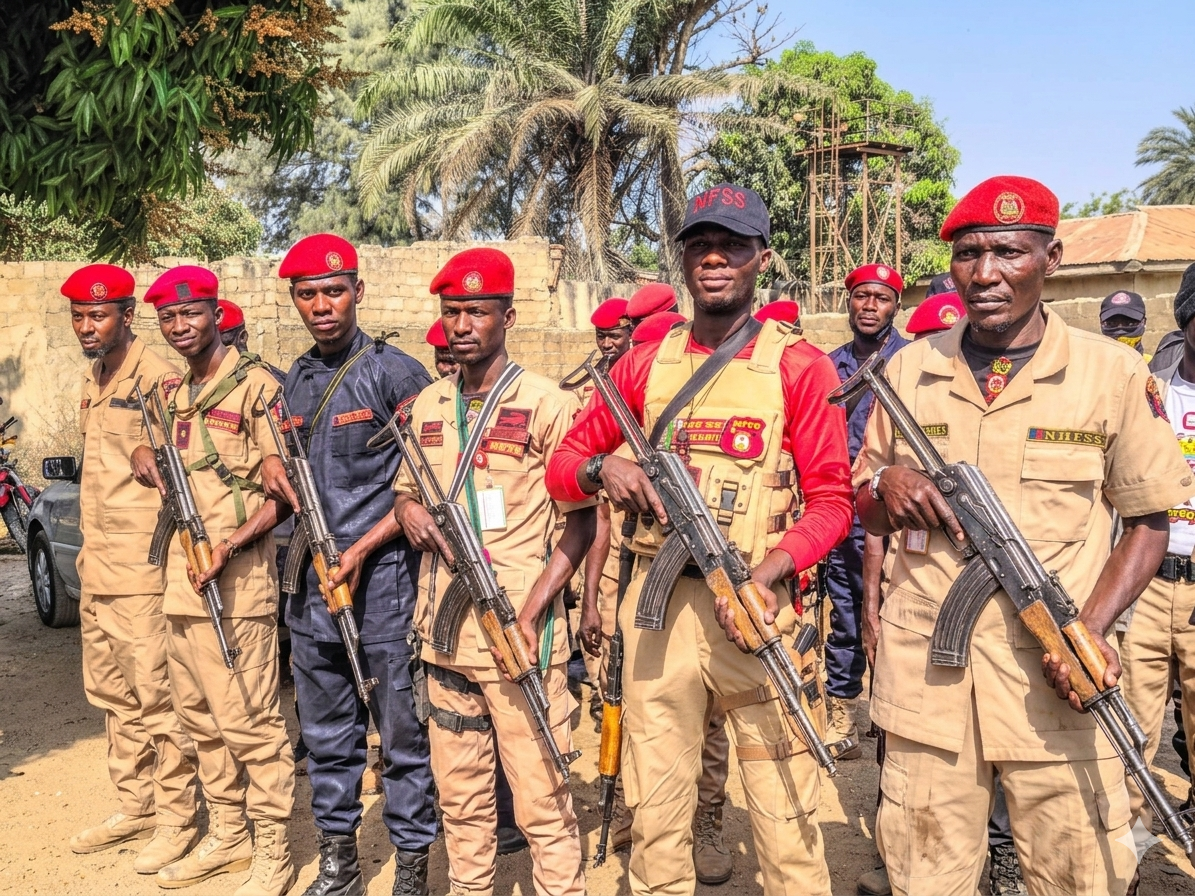
This are NFSS operators under the office of national security advicer

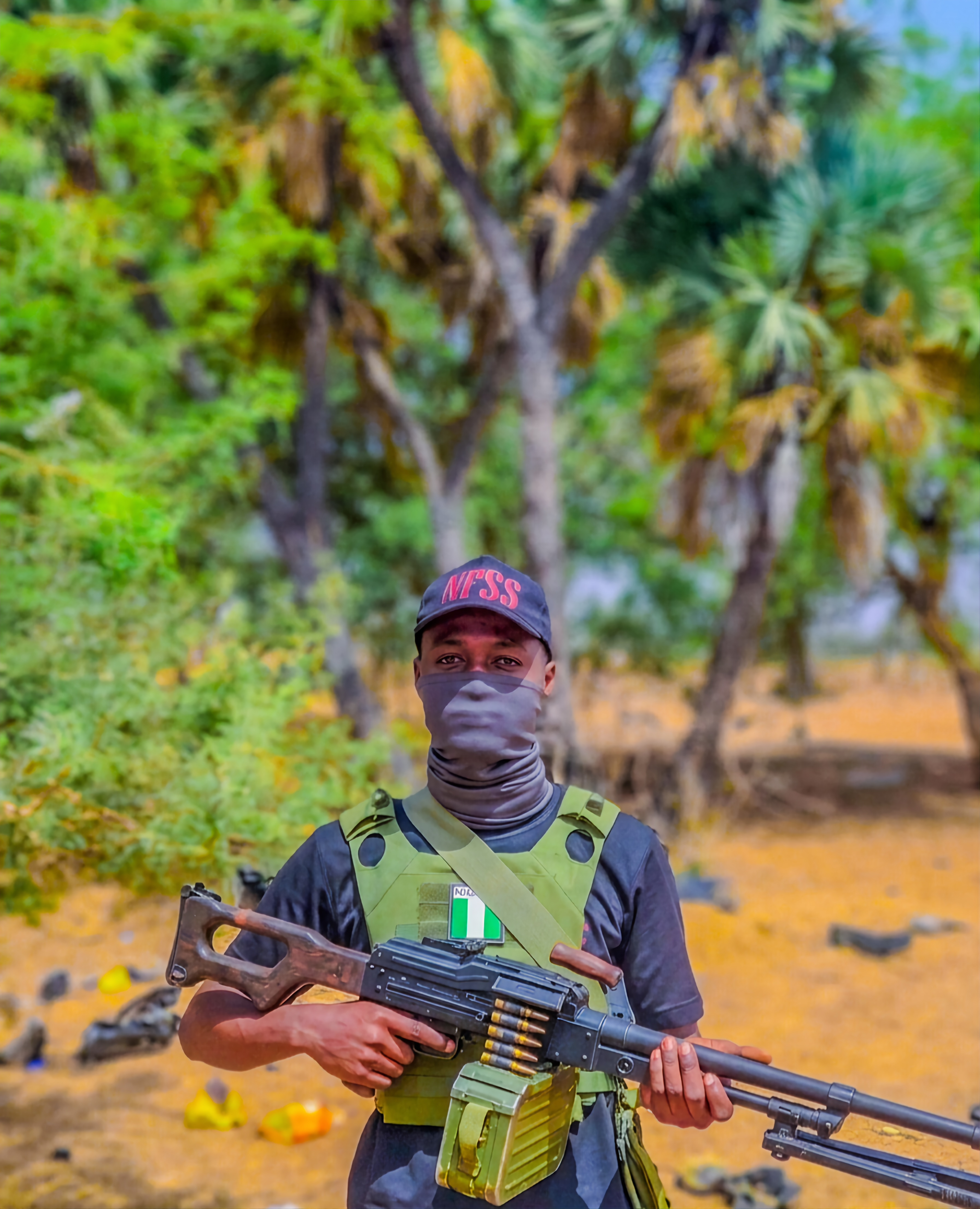
NFSS operator under Counter-terrorism unit Katsina State Command

The Nigerian Forest Security Service (NFSS) is a security organization in Nigeria operating under the supervision of the Office of the National Security Adviser (ONSA) in partnership with the Federal Ministry of Environment. The organization was formed to combat growing insecurity within the country’s vast forest reserves, which are frequently used as operational bases by bandits, insurgents, and kidnappers.

== History and Evolution ==
Originally established as the Nigeria Hunter and Forest Security Service (NHFSS), For over a decade, traditional hunter associations across Nigeria's rural communities began organizing independently to protect local farmlands from criminal elements using thick woods as tactical hideouts. Under the guidance of Joshua Wale Osatimehin, these scattered volunteer associations unified under a single centralized command, evolving through several iterations including the Hunter Group of Nigeria and the Hunter Council of Nigeria, before formally establishing the Nigeria Hunter and Forest Security Service (NHFSS).

The Bill for an Act to Establish the Nigeria Hunters and Forest Security Service (originally introduced as SB 477) was presented by the Senate Committee on Interior and successfully passed its third reading in the Senate. President Bola Tinubu granted administrative backing to the organization via the Forest Guards Initiative, instructing the Office of the National Security Adviser (ONSA) to oversee the deployment, coordination, and arming of personnel. The NFSS has historically run into legal challenges with state prosecutors regarding strict firearms licensing and the limits of its community policing powers. In late 2024, the organization rebranded to its current name. This change was announced by the Commander General, Dr. Wole Joshua Osatimehin, during a visit to Minister Balarabe Abbas Lawal.

== Mission ==
Originally created to monitor forest activities and protect wildlife, the NHFSS now plays an instrumental role in maintaining peace and security, particularly in Nigeria's rural and forested regions. These areas have often been breeding grounds for armed groups, including Boko Haram, Islamic State – West Africa Province (ISWAP), and various bandit gangs, who exploit the vast forests as hideouts.

- NHFSS operatives provide crucial support in tracking and rescuing victims. They are familiar with the terrain and able to conduct swift, covert operations in forests where kidnappers often seek refuge.
- Anti-banditry operations: NHFSS has helped weaken the grip of notorious bandits in states like Sokoto, Kebbi, Katsina, Zamfara, and Kaduna, areas that have witnessed a surge in rural violence. By monitoring forest routes, NHFSS disrupts the movement of bandit gangs and assists in securing farming communities
- Intelligence gathering: NHFSS leverages local knowledge and community engagement to gather real-time intelligence. Their familiarity with remote areas allows them to provide crucial insights to other security agencies and ensure that forested regions are not left unguarded.

== Structure ==
=== Governance ===
The NFSS is run through a centralized national governance model based out of its headquarters in Abuja:

- Commander-General
- State Commands

=== Sub-units ===
==== Counter-Terrorism Unit (CTU) ====
This elite force is dedicated to tackling terror-related activities. They often collaborate with the Nigerian Armed Forces in operations aimed at dismantling terrorist cells and locating insurgents in the country’s forests.

==== Operations Unit ====
This unit focuses on tactical field operations, such as raids, search-and-rescue missions, and patrolling forests to prevent illegal activities. Their role is crucial in maintaining a proactive approach to forest security.

==== Intelligence Unit ====
This unit plays a pivotal role in gathering information from local communities and operatives on the ground, which is then analyzed to anticipate threats or respond effectively to ongoing security challenges.

==== National Forest Guard Special Squad ====
The service includes the National Forest Guard Special Squad, whose personnel are trained and vetted by the Department of State Services (DSS) in collaboration with other armed security agencies. The DSS also coordinates the deployment and operational activities of forest guards to address insecurity in Nigeria's forests.The initiative was approved by President Bola Tinubu, with ONSA directing recruitment and arming.

== Collaboration with other security agencies ==
A key strength of the NHFSS is its collaborative approach. The service works closely with other security agencies such as the Nigerian Army, the Nigeria Police Force, the Nigeria Security and Civil Defence Corps, and Civilian Joint Task Force. This cooperation is vital in coordinating large-scale operations and ensuring that forested regions are not safe havens for criminal activities.

== See also ==
- Nigeria Security and Civil Defence Corps (NSCDC)
- Civilian Joint Task Force (CJTF)
- Western Nigeria Security Network (WNSN) -Amotekun
- Boko Haram insurgency
- Insurgency in Southeastern Nigeria
