= Giwa barracks =

Military detention center in Nigeria

- Location in Nigeria
- Location: Maiduguri, Nigeria; 11°47′55″N 13°10′20″E
- Population: 1,200 (2016)

Notable prisoners
- Members of Boko Haram (ISIL/ISWAP)

Giwa barracks is a military detention center located in northeastern Nigeria, near the city of Maiduguri. Since 2014, the facility has been attacked multiple times by Boko Haram, as prisoners in the facility are mostly confirmed or suspected members of Boko Haram and their families. In 2016, the prison held an estimated 1,200 prisoners. Human rights groups such as Amnesty International have accused the Nigerian military of mistreating and torturing prisoners, as well as running the facility "inhumanely".

== History ==
In 2014, Amnesty International reported that 600 people had been killed after Boko Haram raided and briefly overran Giwa barracks. Most of those who were killed were prisoners who had been recaptured and executed by the military.

In 2015, Giwa barracks was attacked by Boko Haram three times in January, February and May, and bombed once in March.

In May 2016, Amnesty International reported that between January and April 2016, at least 149 detainees had died from hunger and/or mistreatment. This claim was denied by the Nigerian government and the military.
