= United Nations Security Council Resolution 2018 =

UN Security Council Resolution 2018
- UN emblem
- Date: 31 October 2011
- Meeting no.: 6,645
- Code: S/RES/2018 (Document)
- Subject: Peace and security in Africa
- Voting summary: 15 voted for; None voted against; None abstained
- Result: Adopted

Security Council composition
- Permanent members: China; France; Russia; United Kingdom; United States
- Non-permanent members: Bosnia–Herzegovina; Brazil; Colombia; Germany; Gabon; India; Lebanon; Nigeria; Portugal; South Africa

United Nations Security Council Resolution 2018 was unanimously adopted on 31 October, 2011. In the resolution, the 15-member council "condemns all acts of piracy and armed robbery at sea committed off the coast of the states of the Gulf of Guinea." According to reports by the International Maritime Organization (IMO) and the UN Department of Political Affairs (DPA), piracy in the Gulf, which borders West African coastal countries from Ghana to Gabon, has been on the rise in recent years.

== Resolution ==
Resolution 2018 "welcomes the intention to convene a summit of the Gulf of Guinea heads of state in order to consider a comprehensive response in the region and encourages the states of the Economic Community of West African States (ECOWAS), the Economic Community of Central African States (ECCAS), and the Gulf of Guinea Commission (GCC) to develop a comprehensive strategy."

Resolution 2018 also addressed cooperation between states and regional organizations and the shipping and insurance industries, saying that along with the IMO, these entities should work together to provide advice and guidance to ships navigating the gulf.

== See also ==
- List of United Nations Security Council Resolutions 2001 to 2100
