= Director of Defence Information (Nigeria) =

The Director of Defence Information is a Nigerian military personnel appointed by the Nigerian army to provides information technology (IT) and communications support to the Ministry of Defence, Chief of Army Staff, military services, the combatant command and any individual or system contributing to the defense of Nigeria. The appointed officer also serves as spokesperson to the Nigerian army.
