= Nigerian Mobile Police =

Paramilitary arm of the Nigeria Police Force

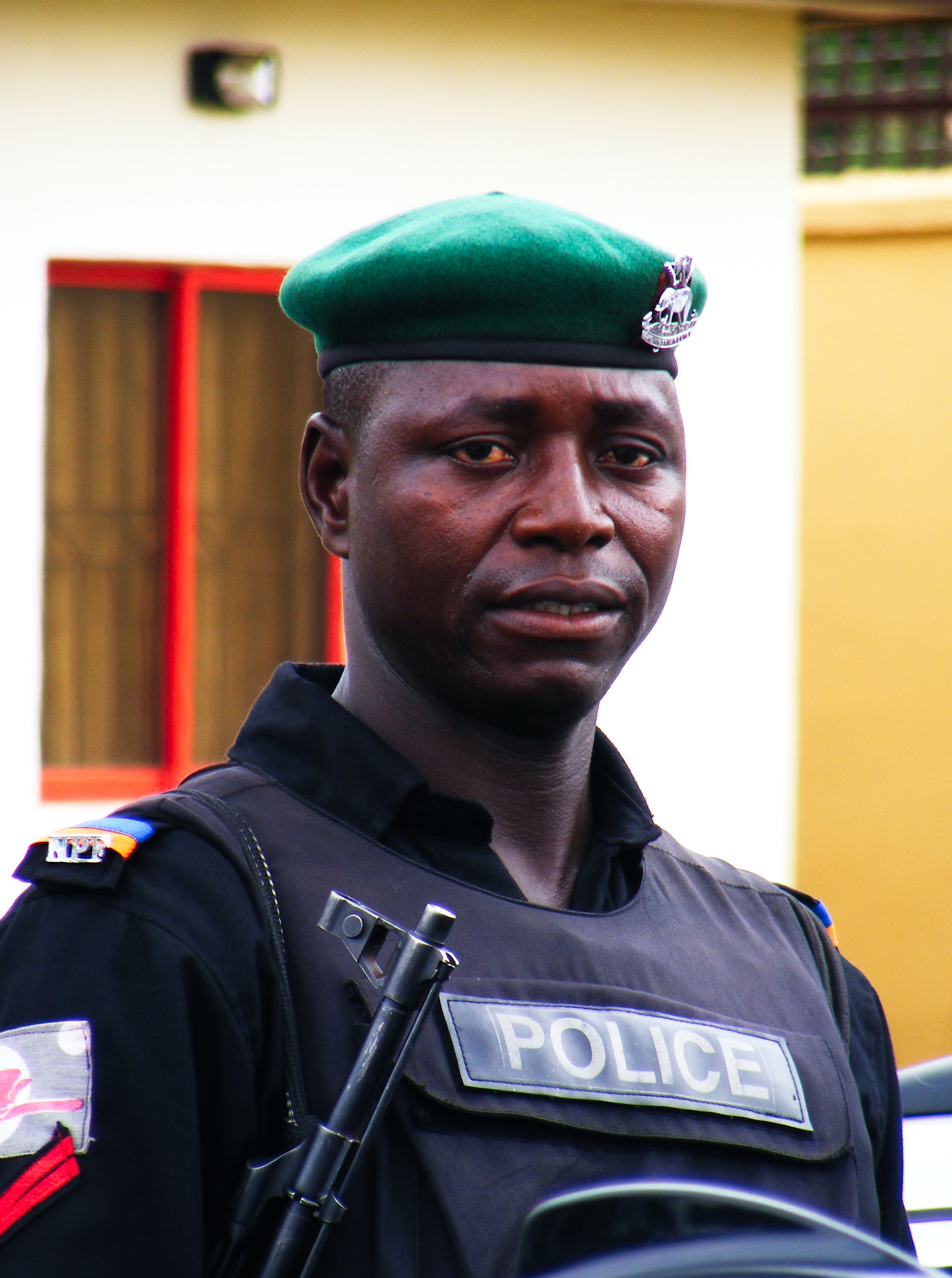
- Mobile policeman.
- Active: 1961; 65 years ago
- Country: Nigeria
- Agency: Nigeria Police Force
- Type: Gendarmerie
- Part of: Department of Operations
- Abbreviation: MOPOL

Structure
- Officers: c. 40,000

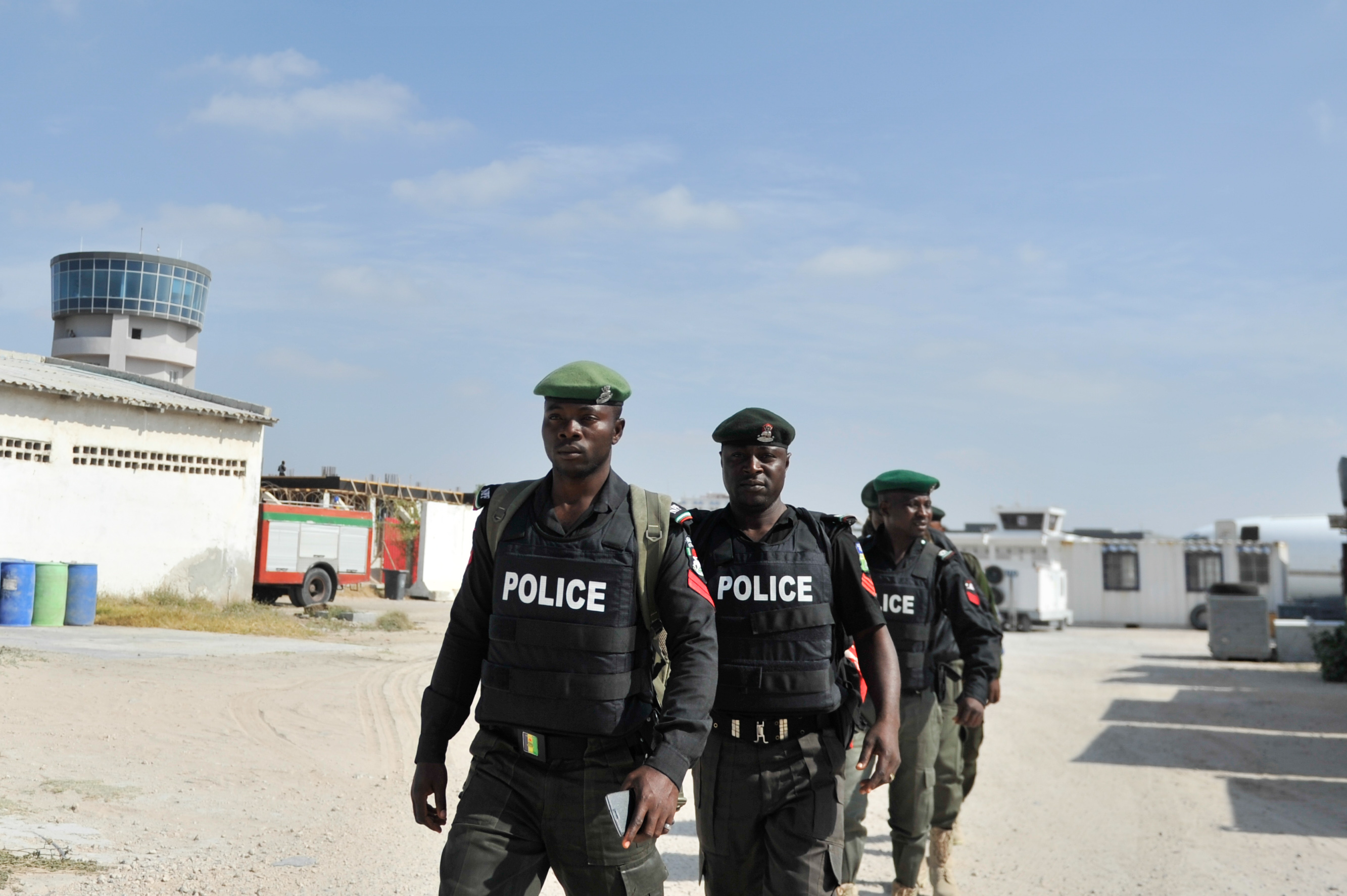
Nigerian Mobile Police

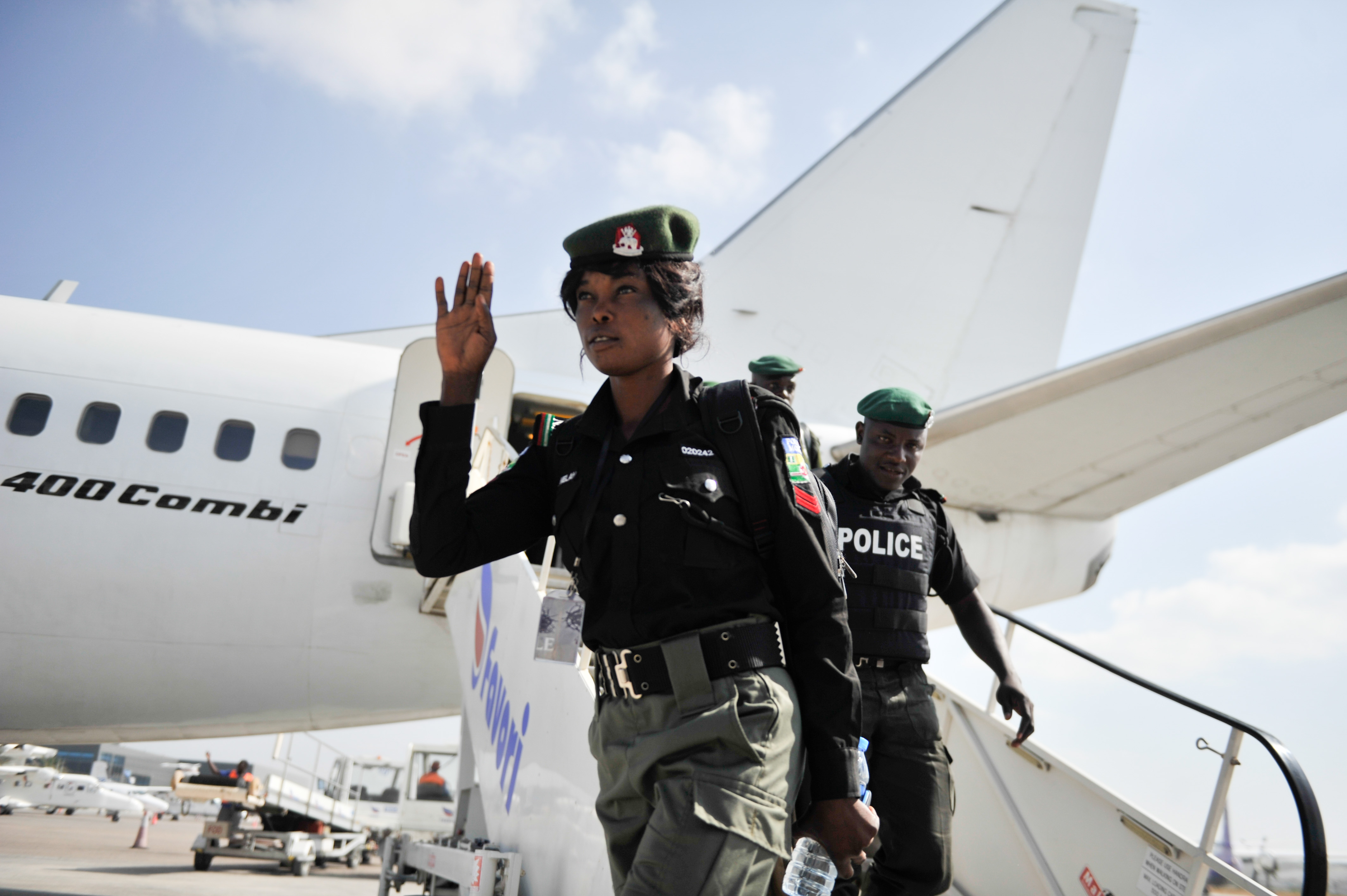
A Female Officer of the Nigerian Mobile Police

The Nigerian Mobile Police (MOPOL) force is the paramilitary arm of the Nigeria Police Force and operate under orders from the Nigerian federal government.

== Organization ==
The Police Mobile Force was established as a strike or Anti-riot unit under the control of the Inspector-General of Police to counter incidents of civil disturbance. It is designated to take over operations of major crisis where conventional police units cannot cope.

The 40,000 strong PMF is deployed in 84 Police Mobile Squadrons, each of approximately 700 men, spread amongst the 36 State Commands and Federal Capital Territory (FCT).

== Mission ==
The Mobile Police have developed into a full-fledged security and anti-crime force to combat armed banditry, violent militant groups, religious insurrection, and many others. The police mobile force also provides protection for the President and Vice President and members of their family along with other top senior federal Government officials. They only protect highly exclusive individuals as other forms of police protection is designated to a special unit in the Nigerian police force known as the Special Protection Unit (SPU). They also serve as guards at the residences of senior Police officers, both serving and retired, the Diplomatic community, their offices. The PMF has also been charged with the protection of strategic economic sites such as oil installations, on and off shore flow station, Pipeline protection, and other oil related servicing companies.

The Police Mobile Force conducts nationwide anti-crime patrols to combat organized crime. They have equally been involved in patrolling and maintenance of law-and-order operations in volatile states of the country such as Lagos, Rivers, Bayelsa, Delta, Kano, and Bauchi.

MOPOL have been in UN, ECOWAS, AU and Others peacekeeping operations.

== Uniforms and equipment ==
MOPOL personnel are easily identified by their distinct green berets.

The typical attire consists of a black shirt/vest with olive drab or khaki trousers, also khaki green shirt, and military boots.

Equipment includes Armoured Personnel Carriers, Anti-riot vehicles, shield and helmets. They also deploy the use of teargas in their operations.

== Criticisms ==
The constraints besetting the Mobile Police are enormous and varied. These range from lack of adequate office and barracks accommodation to a shortage of arms and ammunition, operational vehicles, communication equipment and non payment of allowances to personnel on emergency duties as at when due.

The Mobile Police have been widely reported as brutal violators of human rights, particularly during the 1990s, which has earned them the nickname "Kill-and-Go" amongst the Nigerian population (this is because they are known to gun down innocent civilians and simply walk away with impunity). The MOPOL constitute one of the primary means of political repression employed by the Nigerian state for maintaining control over the population; they were involved in such cases as the oppression and occupation of Ogoniland and MOSOP in the mid-1990s, as well as the Ijaw and Itsekiri conflicts in the latter portion of the decade. Individual human rights abuses are too widespread for reportage, however, reports by the BBC include instances of "killing of a soccer fan over his T-shirt, the killing of five traders who were robbed and the shooting of a popular local musician after a musical performance over money". As part of the Internal Security Task Force deployed in Ogoniland, police funded by Shell opened fire on unarmed protesters, "killing one person and wounding several others".

The Mobile Police are also intimately connected to the security apparatus of the oil corporations operating in Nigeria, particularly the Niger Delta, as the companies are required to pay the requisite salaries and expenses of Mobile Police forces engaged in the protection of oil operations. Mobile Police are designated to the protection of company assets and, although the MOPOL are under state control, companies such as Shell have admitted to supplying arms and munitions to their MOPOL conditions. This has earned the MOPOL forces charged with guarding oil facilities titles of "Shell Police", "Mobil Police", and others.

== See also ==
- Police Field Force
- Petroleum in Nigeria
- Conflict in the Niger Delta
- Movement for the Survival of the Ogoni People
- Nigerian Security Organization (NSO)
- State Security Service (Nigeria) (SSS)
- Nigerian Intelligence Agency (NIA)

== Sources ==
1. World Police Encyclopedia, ed. by Dilip K. Das & Michael Palmiotto published by Taylor & Francis. 2004,
2. World Encyclopedia of Police Forces and Correctional Systems, second edition, Gale., 2006
3. Sullivan, Larry E. Encyclopedia of Law Enforcement. Thousand Oaks: Sage Publications, 2005.
