= Nigeria Police Force =

Nigerian government agency

The Nigeria Police
- Common name: Police
- Abbreviation: NPF
- Motto: Police is your friend

Agency overview
- Formed: 1930
- Preceding agencies: Northern Nigeria Police (NNP); Southern Nigeria Police (SNP)

Jurisdictional structure
- Operations jurisdiction: Nigeria
- Area: 923,768 km^{2}
- Population: 226.2 million
- Governing body: Ministry of Police Affairs
- Constituting instruments: Section 214 of the 1999 Constitution of the Federal Republic of Nigeria (as amended); Nigeria Police Act 2020
- General nature: Local civilian police

Operational structure
- Headquarters: Louis Edet House, Abuja
- Sworn members: 371,800 officers
- Agency executive: IGP Tunji Disu, Inspector-General of Police

Website
- www.npf.gov.ng

The Nigeria Police Force is the principal law enforcement and the lead security agency in Nigeria. It was designated by the 1999 constitution as the national police of Nigeria, with exclusive jurisdiction throughout the country. As at 2021, it had a staff strength of about 371,800. There are currently plans to increase the force to 650,000, adding 280,000 new recruits to the existing 370,000. The Nigeria Police Force is a very large organisation consisting of 36 State commands and Federal Capital Territory (FCT) grouped into 17 zones and 8 administrative organs. As of February 2026, the NPF is headed by IGP (Inspector General) Tunji Disu. In 2020, it underwent major overhauls.

== History ==
=== Origins ===
In 1879, a 1,200-member armed paramilitary Hausa Constabulary was formed. In 1896 the Lagos Police was established. More so, the Niger Coast Constabulary, was formed in Calabar in 1894 under the newly proclaimed Niger Coast Protectorate. In the north, the Royal Niger Company set up the Royal Niger Company Constabulary in 1888 with headquarters at Lokoja.

When the protectorates of Northern and Southern Nigeria were proclaimed in the early 1900s, part of the Royal Niger Company Constabulary became the Northern Nigeria Police, and part of the Niger Coast Constabulary became the Southern Nigeria Police. During the colonial period, most police were associated with local governments (native authorities).

=== Early years ===
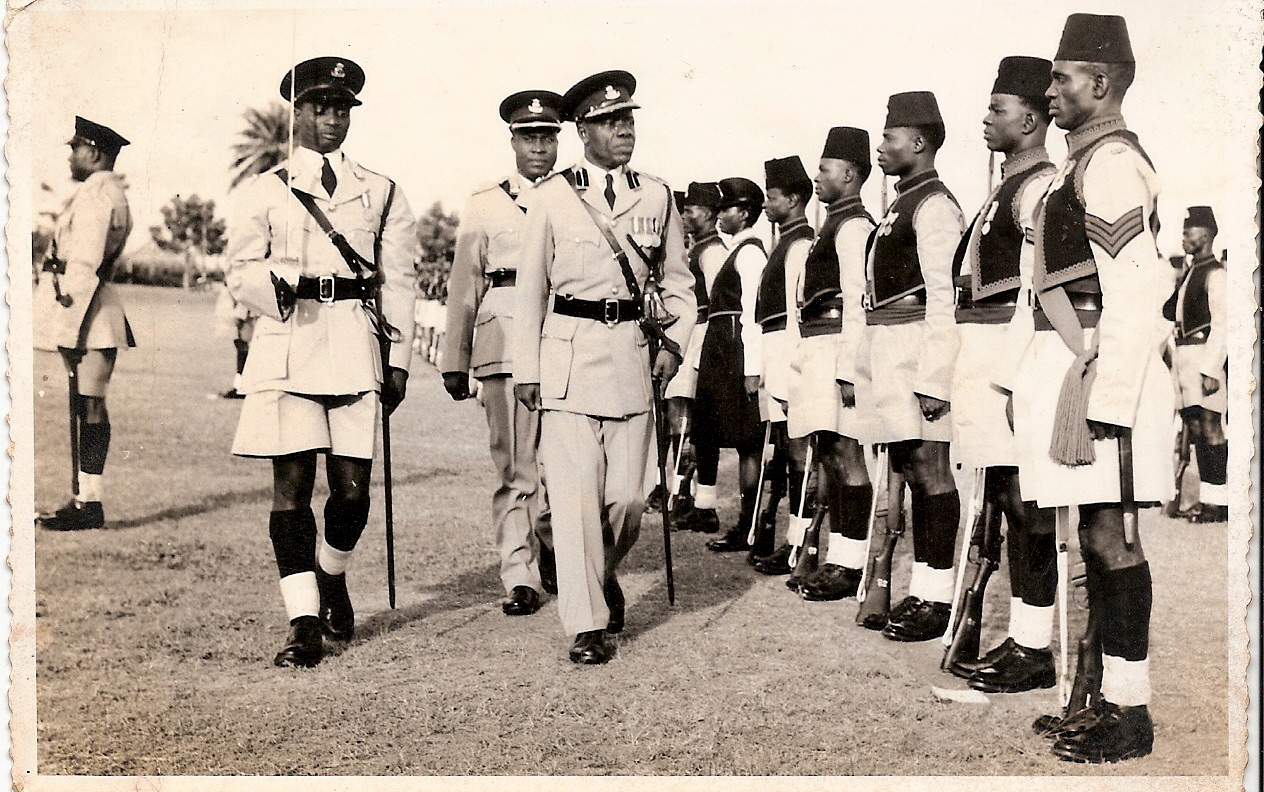
A post-independence inspection of police officers.

In the 1960s, under the First Republic, these forces were first regionalised and then nationalised. The Nigeria Police Force performed conventional police functions and was responsible for internal security generally; for supporting the prison, immigration, and customs services; and for performing military duties within or outside Nigeria as directed. Plans were announced in mid-1980 to expand the force to 200,000.

=== 1980s reorganization ===
By 1983, according to the federal budget, the strength of the NPF was almost 152,000, but other sources estimated it to be between 20,000 and 80,000. Presently, there are more than 1,300 police stations nationwide. Police officers were not usually armed but were issued weapons when required for specific missions or circumstances. They were often deployed throughout the country, but in 1989, well into Nigeria's second military dictatorship, Ibrahim Babangida announced that a more significant number of officers would be posted to their native areas to facilitate police-community relations.

The 1986 NPF reorganization was occasioned by a public eruption of tensions between the police and the army. A superintendent was suspended for a time for grumbling that the army had usurped police functions and kept police pay low, and there were fights between police and army officers over border patrol jurisdiction. The armed forces chief of staff announced a thorough reorganization of the NPF into the seven new area commands and five directorates (criminal investigations, logistics, supplies, training, and operations) under deputy inspectors general. About 2,000 constables and 400 senior police officers were dismissed by mid-1987, leaving senior police officers disgruntled.

In late 1986, the NPF was reorganized nationwide into seven area commands, which superseded a command structure corresponding to each of the States of Nigeria. Each command was under a commissioner of police and was further divided into police provinces and divisions under local officers. NPF headquarters, which was also an area command, supervised and coordinated the other area commands. Later these Area Commands were grouped under Zone Commands as follows: Zone 1, Headquartered Kano, with Kano, Katsina, and Jigawa Commands Zone 2, Headquartered Lagos, with Lagos, and Ogun commands Zone 3, Headquartered Yola, with Adamawa, and Gombe Commands.

In mid-1989 another NPF reorganization was announced after the AFRC's acceptance of a report by Rear Admiral Murtala Nyako. In 1989 the Nigerian Police Force also created a Quick Intervention Force in each state, separate from the mobile police units, specifically to monitor political events and to quell unrest during the transition to civil rule. Each state unit of between 160 and 400 police was commanded by an assistant superintendent and equipped with vehicles, communications gear, weapons, and crowd control equipment, including cane shields, batons, and tear gas. A Federal Investigation Bureau (FIB) was to be set up as the successor to the Directorate of Intelligence and Investigation; three directorates were established for operations, administration, and logistics, each headed by a deputy inspector general.

In February 1989, Ibrahim Babangida abolished the Police Service Commission and established the Nigeria Police Council in its stead, under direct presidential control. The new council was chaired by the president; the chief of General Staff, the minister of internal affairs, and the police inspector general were members. As part of the government reorganization in September 1990, Alhajji Sumaila Gwarzo, formerly SSS director, was named to the new post of minister of state, police affairs.

=== 2020-present ===
In September 2020, the Nigerian National Assembly passed the Police Reform Bill 2020, which was signed into law by Nigerian President Muhammadu Buhari on 16 September 2020. The new law, known as the Nigeria Police Act of 2020, repeals the Police Act Cap. P19. Laws of the Federation, 2004, and provides for a more effective and well-organized Police Force, driven by the principles of transparency and accountability in its operations and management of its resources. It also addresses the challenges of structuring, appointments, promotions, discipline, postings, living conditions, pension and retirement benefits of the Nigeria Police Force.

=== Dismantlement of SARS ===
On 4 October 2020, Muhammed Adamu, inspector general of police (IGP), announced the Federal Special Anti-Robbery Squad (FSARS) and other tactical squads must stop such operations, including traffic checks, "with immediate effect." On 11 October, one week after ceasing operations, Adamu dismantled SARS. On 22 October 2020, Nigerian President Muhammadu Buhari confirmed in a publicly aired address that Nigeria's controversial Special Anti-Robbery Squad (SARS) had been dismantled and also accused some members of SARS of committing "acts of excessive use of force" when the unit was operational. Plans were then put in place to prosecute some former Sars members for also extortion, rape, and murder. Numerous Nigerians had long accused the controversial police unit of committing acts of extortion, rape, torture and murder. After the disbandment of the SARS unit of the Nigerian police force, another tactical unit was set up called (SWAT).

== Authority ==
The Nigerian Police (NP) is designated by the 1999 constitution as the national police of Nigeria with exclusive jurisdiction throughout the country. Constitutional provision also exists, however, for the establishment of separate NPF branches "forming part of the armed forces of the Federation or for their protection of harbours, waterways, railways and airfields." One such branch, the Port Security Police, was reported by different sources to have a strength in 1990 of between 1,500 and 12,000.

== Organization ==
The NPF maintains a three-tier administrative structure of departments, zonal and state commands:

- Departments
  - Department of Finance and Administration
  - Department of Operations
    - Department of Federal Operations
    - Force Veterinary Section
    - Border Patrol Section
    - Police Mobile Force
    - Explosive Ordnance Disposal Unit
    - Force Police Airwing
    - Force Dog Section
    - Force Mounted Troop
    - Force Armaments Section
    - Counter-Terrorism Unit (CTU)
    - Force Transport Section
    - Directorate of Peacekeeping Operations
    - National Inland Waterways
    - Central Motor Registry (CMR)
    - Force Marine Section
    - Special Protection Unit (SPU)
    - INEC Liaison Unit
  - Department of Logistics and Supply
  - Department of Criminal Investigation
  - Force Criminal Investigation Department (FORCID)
    - Administration
    - Anti-Fraud Section
    - The Central Criminal Registry (CCR)
    - Special Anti-Robbery Squad (SARS) (dissolved)
    - Special Weapons and Tactics (SWAT)
    - X-Squad
    - General Investigation
    - Special Fraud Unit (SFU)
    - Legal Section
    - Forensic Science Laboratory
    - Interpol Liaison
    - Homicide
    - Anti-Human Trafficking Unit
    - National Cybercrime Center (NPF-NCCC)
    - Force Intelligence Bureau (FIB)
    - DCI Kaduna Annex
    - Counter Terrorism Unit (CTU)
  - Department of Training and Development
    - Police Staff College, Jos
    - Police Academy, Kano
    - Police College, Ikeja
    - Police College, Kaduna
    - Police College, Maiduguri
    - Police College, Oji-River
    - Police Detective College, Enugu
    - Police College of Information Technology, Abeokuta
    - Police Mobile Training School, Gwoza
    - Police Mobile Training School, Ila-orangun
    - Mounted/Dog Training Schools, Jos
    - Traffic Training School, Ikeja
    - Police School of Music, Ikeja
    - Police School of Communication, Ikeja & Kaduna
    - Police School of Anti-Terrorism, Nonwa-Tai
    - Police Training School, Sokoto
    - Police Training School, Bauchi
    - Police Training School, Minna
    - Police Training School, Jos
    - Police Training School, Nonwa Tai
    - Police Training School, Ibadan
    - Police Training School, Benin City
    - Police Training School, Oyin Akoko
    - Police Training School, Makurdi
    - Police Training School, Iperu
    - Police Training School, Calabar
    - Police Training School, Ilorin
    - Police Training School, Ikeja
  - Department of Research and Planning
  - Department of Information Technology
- Formations
  - Port Authority Police
  - Police Cooperative
  - Police Academy Kano
  - Marine Police
  - Counter Terrorism Squad
- Units
  - Nigeria Police & Sport
  - Police Air Wing
  - Police Medical Services

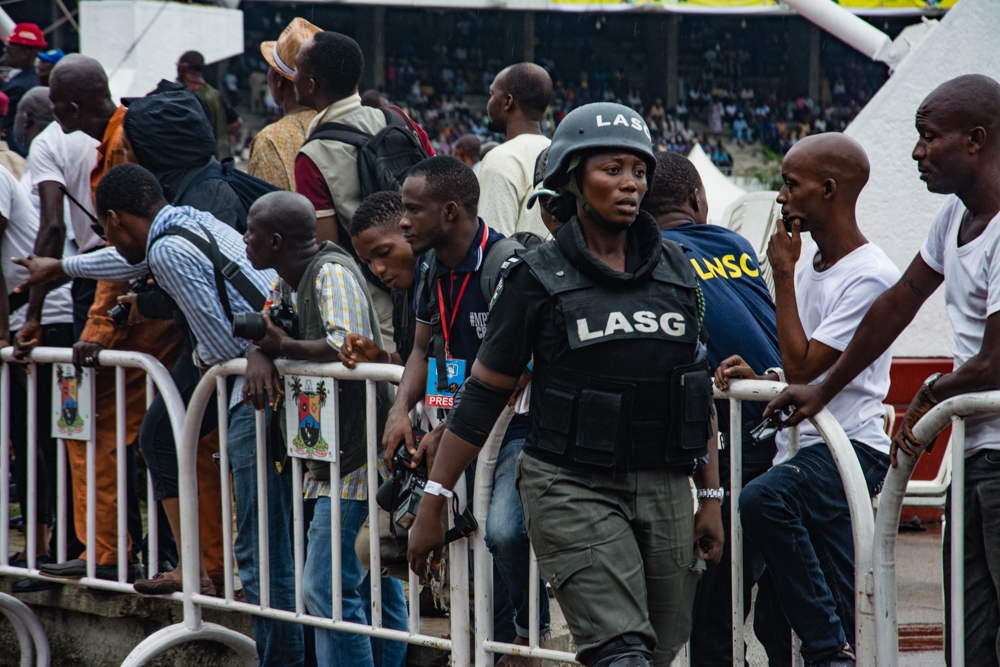
A female police officer during the Eyo festival

The Directorate of Operations was subdivided into four units under a deputy director—operations, training, communications, and the Mobile Police. The Directorate of Administration was composed of an administration unit headed by an assistant inspector general (AIG), and of budget and personnel units under commissioners. The Directorate of Logistics had four units—procurement, workshop/transport, supply, and work/maintenance—under AIGs. The zonal arrangements were retained. However, AIGs were authorized to transfer officers up to the rank of chief superintendent, to set up provost units, to deploy mobile units, and to promote officers between the ranks of sergeant and inspector. The above three Directorates were renamed Departments.

The Force Criminal Investigation Department (FCID) is the highest criminal investigation arm of the Nigeria Police NPF. The department is headed by a Deputy Inspector-General (DIG). Its primary functions include the investigation and prosecution of severe and complex criminal cases within and outside the Country. The department also coordinates crime investigations throughout the NPF. The FCID is divided into sections, with most of them headed by Commissioners of Police (CPs).

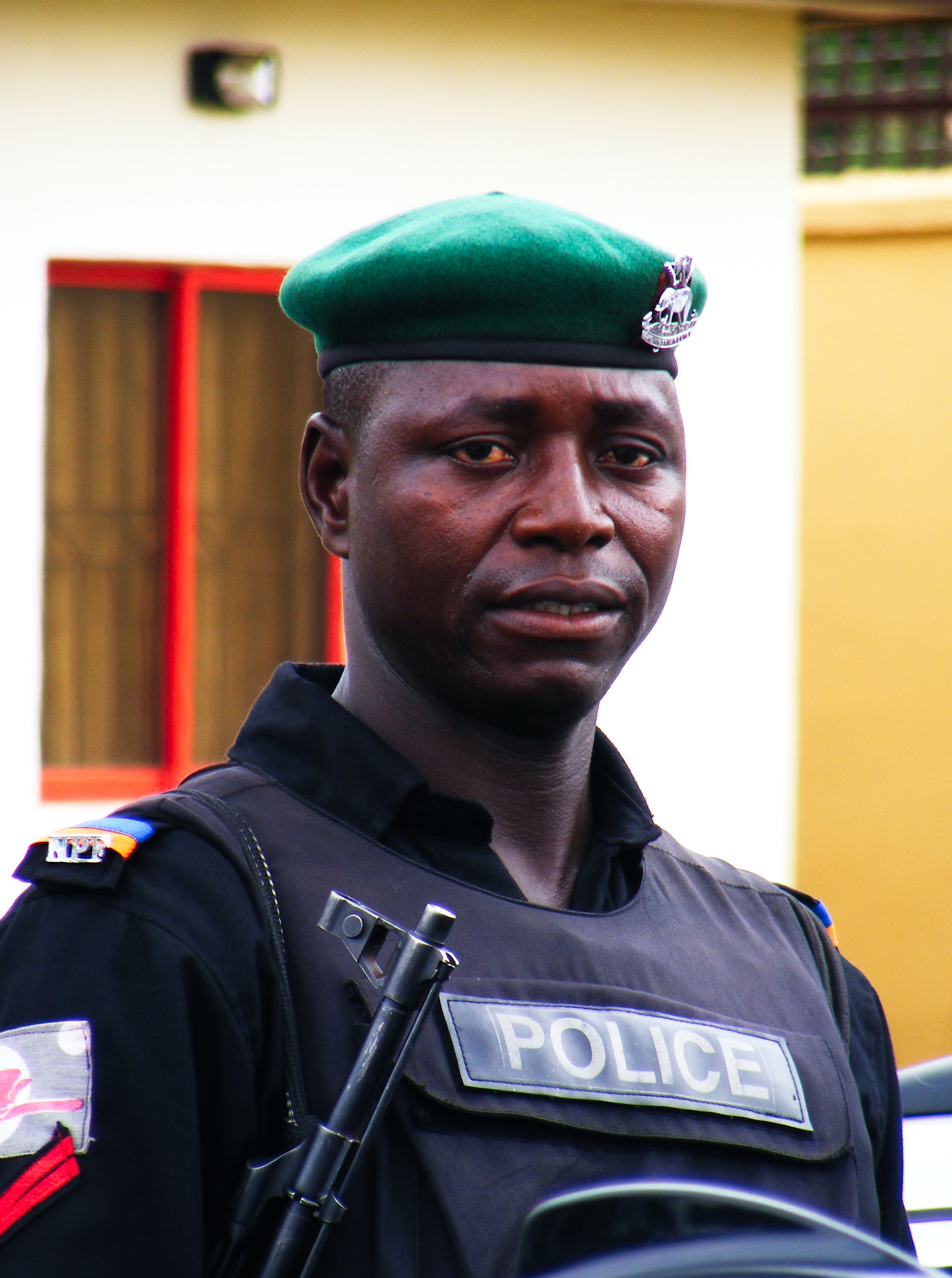
Mobile policeman.

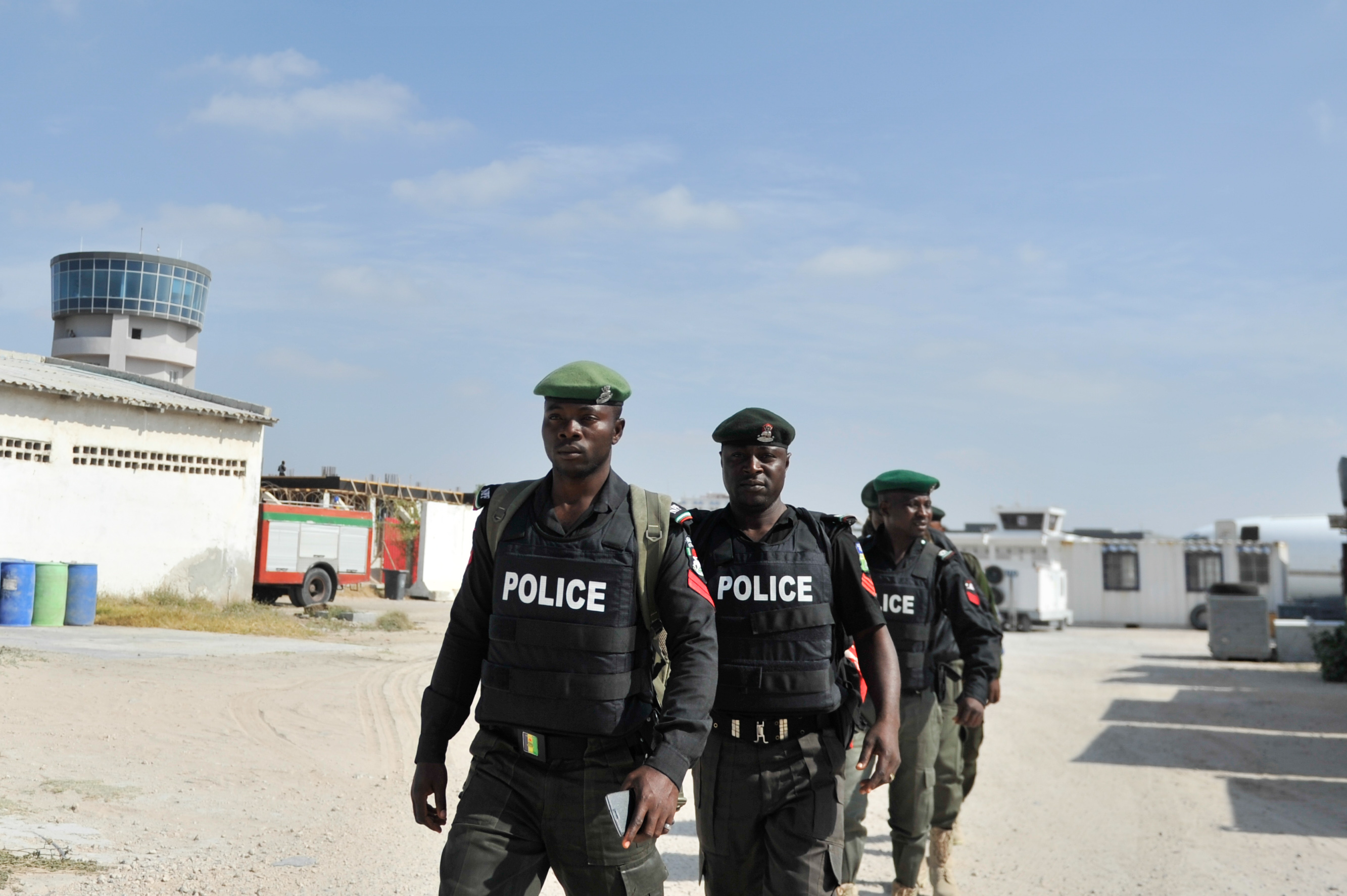
Nigerian Mobile Police

The Police Mobile Force was established as a strike or Anti-riot unit under the control of the Inspector-General of Police to counter incidents of civil disturbance. It is designated to take over operations of major crisis where conventional police units cannot cope. There are presently 12 MOPOL Commands, MOPOLs 1 thru 12, controlling 52 Police Mobile Squadrons which are spread amongst the 36 State Commands and Federal Capital Territory (FCT).

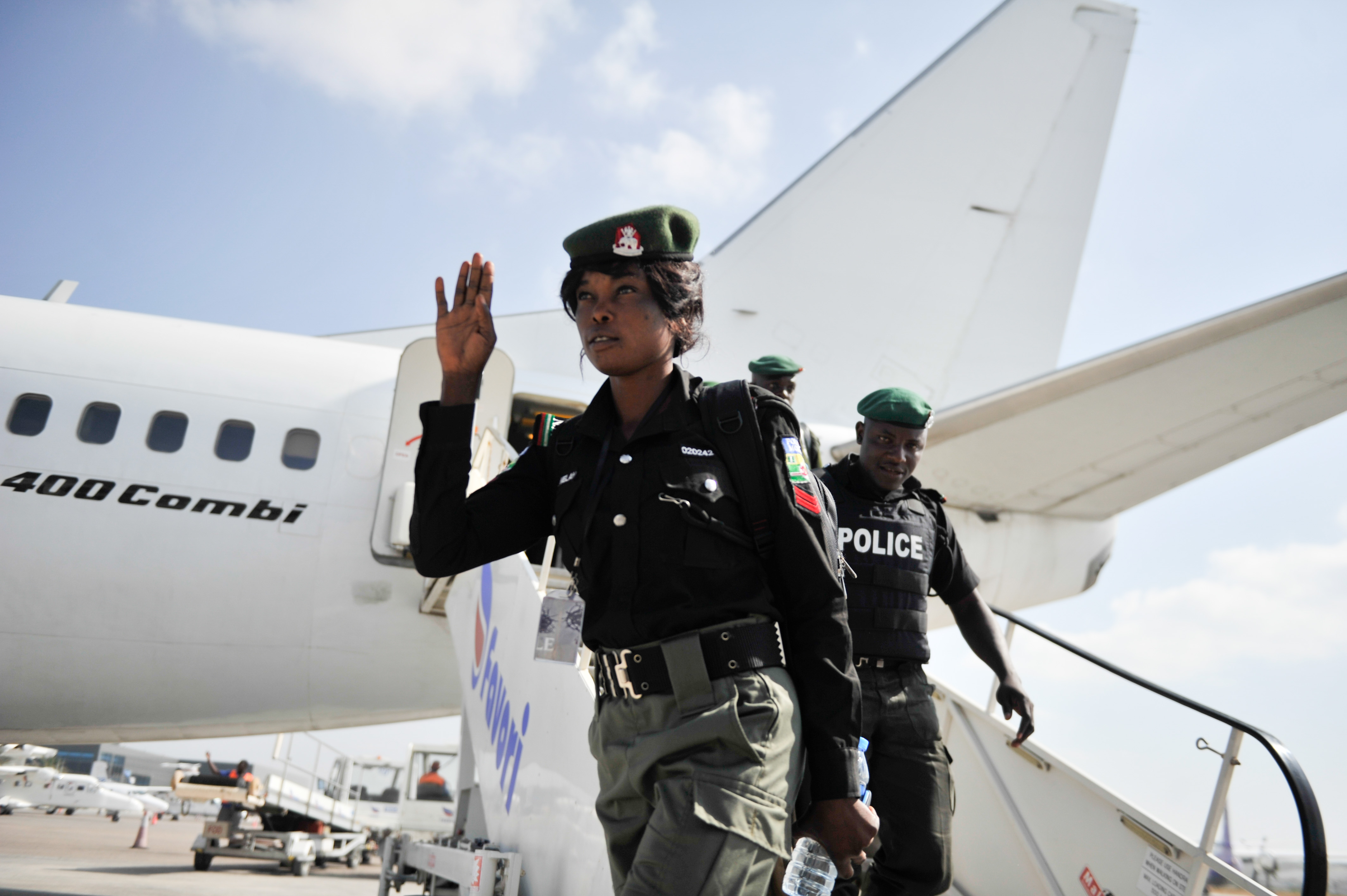
A female officer of the Nigerian Police.

== Supervision of the Nigeria Police ==
Three major Governmental Agencies oversee the control and supervision of the Nigerian Police Force; the Police Service Commission, the Nigerian Police Council and the Ministry of Police Affairs. The Nigeria Police Force was under the general operational and administrative control of an Inspector General (IGP) appointed by the president and responsible for the maintenance of law and order. He was supported at headquarters in Lagos by a Deputy Inspector General (DIG) and in each state by police commissioners. The 1979 constitution provided for a Police Service Commission that was responsible for NPF policy, organization, administration, and finance (except for pensions).

=== Nigeria Police Council (NPC) ===
Established in 1989, the Police Council is composed of the President, all state Governors, the Chairman of the PSC, and the Inspector General of Police. It is mandated to provide general supervision of the police and to advise the President on the appointment of the Inspector-General.

=== Police Service Commission (PSC) ===
The Police Service Commission (PSC) is the civilian oversight body on the police. It is responsible for appointment, promotion, and discipline of all police officers except the Inspector General of Police. It shall collaborate, cooperate and work with all the stake holders, namely the police council with the President of Nigeria as chairman, all the governors of the Federating States of Nigeria, the Minister of Interior and the Inspector-General of Police as members to turn the police around and enable it to meet the challenges of the 21st century.

== Budget ==
The Nigeria Police Force operating budget between 1984 and 1988 remained in the N360 million to N380 million range, and in 1988 increased to N521 million. More notable were large capital expenditure infusions of N206 million in 1986 and N260.3 million in 1988, representing 3.5 and 2.5 percent of total federal capital expenditures in those years. These increases were used to acquire new communications equipment, transport, and weapons to combat the rising crime wave, such as 100 British Leyland DAF Comet trucks delivered in 1990 Despite these purchases, an NPF study in late 1990 concluded that the force's budget must double to meet its needs.

Following the salary increase of 2010, the federal government under the leadership of Goodluck Jonathan extended the salary and allowance package to the military, paramilitary, police and intelligence community, who were not always covered by similar salary reviews in the past. The extension of the jumbo increase to other public servants as opposed to the core civil servants, shot the entire wage bill to N267. 4 billion in year 2010. Based on this salary structure below are the details of salary per rank or grade of Nigerian Police officers. The Federal Government of Nigeria under the leadership of President Muhammadu Buhari on 26 November 2018 approved a new salary structure, however the details are yet to be made public hence it is not included or updated into the table below.

== Issues ==
Although, the NPF is generally considered an attractive career, the NPF has experienced endemic problems with recruiting, training, inefficiency, and indiscipline, and it lacked expertise in specialized fields. Corruption and dishonesty were widespread, engendering a low level of public confidence, failure to report crimes, and tendencies to resort to self-help. Police were more adept at paramilitary operations and the exercise of force than at community service functions or crime prevention, detection, and investigation.

During the Regime of former head of state Olusegun Obasanjo, an attempt was made to expand the NPF by reducing the recruitment age from nineteen to seventeen and by enrolling demobilized soldiers, but it failed. In mid-1980 the then federal police minister acknowledged that the police had recovered only 14 percent of the US$900 million worth of property reported stolen in the preceding six months, and that only 20 percent of the 103,000 persons arrested had been found guilty, a performance record about the same as that reported in the 1960s. The use of excessive violence in quelling student disorders led the AFRC in June 1986 to direct the police to use only rubber bullets in containing student riots.

Reports of police collusion with criminals were common, as were official appeals to police officers to change their attitude toward the public, to be fair and honest, and to avoid corrupt practices. In an effort to reduce bribery and to make identification of offenders easier, police officers on beats and at checkpoints were not allowed to carry more than N5 on their person. In September 2005, Nigeria withdrew 120 police officers serving in the United Nations Congo mission because of accusations that they had engaged in sexual abuses.

The NPF is alleged to follow a policy of "Fire for Fire" in which many captured suspects die in police custody or are "shot while attempting to escape". Decades of police and official corruption and continued failure to train police officers properly has led to a situation where extrajudicial killing is an accepted form of dealing with people the police believe to be criminals. The most recent victim of which is Yusuf Mohamed, the leader of the Boko Haram sect in Nigeria, was alive when captured by the army.

Even before the violence surrounding the Boko Haram uprising in northern Nigeria, there were questions over the conduct of the security forces. The government is currently attempting to reform the police. They have produced a White Paper with 79 recommendations for improving the police force, which is due to be considered by the National Assembly and turned into a Police Reform Bill. Key reforms such as: Police officers are paid as little as $40 (£26) a month, this should be raised to $100 for police constables, Deal with the estimated 10,000 officers with criminal records hired between 2001 and 2004, establish a reliable system for the public to complain about the police, better educated Recruits should attain a certain level of qualification before being considered, job applications should be transparently managed, policemen should not have to buy their own, the police are in dire need of an up-to-date communication network, and the police should be given better investigating tools and the training to use them The Nigerian Police was ranked as the institution viewed as the most corrupt in Nigeria, according to a survey done at Ahmadu Bello University.

In February 2019, it was reported that Nigerian police officers commonly gained extra money by extorting residents. On 30 July 2019, three Nigeria Police Force Officers from Anambra State were arrested on charges of extorting three residents. On 10 November 2019, the Nigerian Police Force issued a statement revealing that Safer Highways Patrol officer Onuh Makedomu was arrested after being filmed accepting a bribe from a motorist in Lagos. On 9 March 2020, two Nigeria Police Force officers from Lagos, Assistant Superintendent of Police (ASP) Adebayo Ojo and Sergeant Adeleke Mojisola were both arrested on charges of extorting a woman. On 11 April 2020, another Nigeria Police Force officer from Lagos, Inspector Taloju Martins, was arrested after being caught on camera exhorting a motorist. On 3 June 2020, the Adamawa State police command announced that one of its officers was arrested for murdering a motorcycle motorist who refused to pay him a bribe.

In October 2018, eight Boipatong police officers were arrested for torturing and then murdering a Nigerian national in October 2017. On 2 August 2019, two officers of the Nigerian Police Force's Anti-Cultism Squad, Insp. Ogunyemi Olalekan and Sgt. Godwin Orji, were arrested and charged with murdering a man during a raid in Lagos. On 21 August 2019, four operatives of the Nigerian Police Force's notorious Special Anti-Robbery Squad (SARS) were arrested and charged with murder after being caught on film manhandling and then shooting to death two suspected phone thieves in broad daylight. The two suspected phone thieves were shot dead after they had been arrested.

On 5 January 2020, three Nigerian Police Force officers were arrested after beating a bus passenger, who also turned out to be Nigerian Supreme Court Justice Obasi, after he refused to unlock his mobile phone. On 3 April 2020, a Nigerian police officer was arrested for assaulting a port worker. On 18 April 2020, the Nigerian Police Force stated that two of its officers were arrested after being caught on film beating a woman at the Odo Ori Market in Iwo, Osun State.

On 28 April 2020, it was reported that the Nigerian Police Force's Rivers State Police Command arraigned former Sergeant Bitrus Osaiah in court for shooting to death his female colleague, Lavender Elekwachi, during a raid on street trading and illegal motor parks the previous week. Osaiah was dismissed as a police officer the previous day for killing Elekwachi, who also held the rank of a Sergeant. It was reported that Osaiah was in fact arrested the killing. On 21 May 2020, Yahaha Adeshina, the Divisional Police Officer of Ilemba Hausa Division, was arresting for assisting Kehinde Elijah and Ezeh Joseph in the 10 May 2020 murder of sergeant Onalaja Onajide. Adeshina and the other shooters were wanted for "violent crimes". On 30 May 2020, two Lagos police officers were arrested for shooting to death a 16-year-old girl.

On 31 July, Peter Ebah, an Inspector officer for the NPF's Rivers Command, was arrested for raping a woman at a checkpoint in the Tai area of Rivers State for not wearing a face mask. As of 9 September 2020, he was still in custody for the rape. A case involving accusations that Nigeria Police Force officers in Abuja raped some of 65 women who were arrested for illicit nightclub activity in April 2019 after they refused to pay the officers bribes for their release was still ongoing as well.

By October 2020, End SARS protestors alleged that Nigerian police officers were by now not adequately paid and, despite protesting police brutality, called for an increase in police salaries so they could be "adequately compensated for protecting lives and property of citizens" as one of their five demands.

=== Human rights violation index ===
There have been reports of corruption and incessant violation of human rights by the Nigerian Police Force (NPF). One of the most damning reports was published on 17 August 2010 by Human Rights Watch (HRW). Another report by Amnesty International USA accused the NPF of intimidation of Journalists, forced eviction, and other human rights violation.

On 12 May 2020, ThisDay newspaper carried a report on the gross abuse and violation of human rights committed by the Nigerian Police Force during the COVID-19 pandemic lockdown. The newspaper report accused the Nigerian Police Force of committing more extrajudicial killings and other human rights violations during the period of the lockdown extension in the country, stating that this accounted for 59.6 per cent of the total cases of violations.

== Training ==
Police training is directed from headquarters by a deputy inspector general designated as commander. Recruits were trained at police colleges in Oji River, Maiduguri, Kaduna, and Ikeja, which also offered training to other security personnel, such as armed immigration officers. The Police College Ikeja trained cadet assistant superintendents and cadet subinspectors.There were also in-service training schools, including the Police Mobile Force Training School at Guzuo, southwest of Abuja, the Counter Terrorism (CTU) training school, Nonwa Tai, Rivers State, the Police Detective College at Enugu, the Police Dogs Service Training Centre, and the Mounted Training Centre.

In August 1989, Former head of state, General Ibrahim Babangida (RTD) laid down the foundation stone for a Nigerian Police Academy (NPA) in Kano State. The NPA was to be affiliated with Bayero University until adequate infrastructure was available for independent operation. Admission was to be regulated by merit, by the quota system, and by federal character. The commandant was to be at least an AIG and assisted by a provost who would oversee the academic program.

Modeled after the Nigerian Defence Academy in Kaduna, the NPA would offer a five-year academic and professional degree program for new cadets and an eighteen-month intensive course for college graduates aspiring to a police career. Ibrahim Babangida also disclosed plans to obtain technical assistance from Britain to establish a central planning and training program to modernize and upgrade police training.

== Equipment ==
The Nigeria police force uses various vehicles in carrying out its constitutional duty, listed below:

- Bell 412
- Terradyne Armored Vehicles Gurkha
- Toyota Hilux
- Cessna Citation Excel
- Asisguard Songar
- STM Togan

== See also ==
- Crime in Nigeria
- Petroleum in Nigeria
- Conflict in the Niger Delta
- Movement for the Survival of the Ogoni People
- END SARS

Nigerian law enforcement:

- Nigerian Mobile Police
- Nigeria Security and Civil Defence Corps (NSCDC)
- State Security Service (SSS)
- National Intelligence Agency (NIA)
- Nigeria Customs Service
- Federal Road Safety Corps (FRSC)
- Economic and Financial Crimes Commission
- National Drug Law Enforcement Agency

Quasi law enforcement or security services:

- Nigerian Hunter & Forest Security Service (NHFSS)
- Nigerian Forest Security Service (NFSS)
- Civilian Joint Task Force (CJTF)
- Western Nigeria Security Network (WNSN) -Amotekun

== Other sources ==
1. World Police Encyclopedia, ed. by Dilip K. Das & Michael Palmiotto published by Taylor & Francis. 2004,
2. World Encyclopedia of Police Forces and Correctional Systems, second edition, Gale., 2006
3. http://www.informationng.com/2010/07/jonathan-extends-pay-rise-to-military-police.html
4. https://www.topnigerianjobs.com/nigeria-police-recruitment-npf/
5. https://www.studymaterials.com.ng/nigerian-police-recruitment-past-questions-and-answers/
6. https://www.nigeriadailytimes.com/2019/01/buhari-appoints-new-igp/
7. Ajakaiye, Adeola (2 October 2016). "Nigeria's quest for democratic policing". Business day.
8. "Nigerian police arrest officer filmed collecting bribe". 10 November 2019. Archived from the original on 15 October 2020.
