= Chris Olukolade =

Nigerian military personnel

Director of Defence Information
- In office March 19, 2013 – July 30, 2015
- Preceded by: Brig Gen. Mohammed Yerima
- Succeeded by: Col. Rabe Abubakar

Personal details
- Born: March 18, 1959 (age 67) Idoani, Ondo State, Nigeria
- Education: Nigerian Defence Academy; Obafemi Awolowo University

Military service
- Allegiance: Nigeria
- Branch/service: Nigerian Army
- Years of service: 1982–2015
- Rank: Major general
- Unit: 81 Division, 82 division, 2 division, army HQ & defense HQ
- Commands: 149 Infantry Battalion
- Battles/wars: Boko Haram Insurgency War, [peace keeping operations in Liberia, Sierra Leone & Sudan

Chris Olukolade (born March 18, 1959) is a retired Major general of the Nigerian army and former Director of Defence Information. He succeeded Brig Gen. Mohammed Yerima on March 19, 2013, and was succeeded by Colonel Rabe Abubakar Prior to his retirement on July 30, 2015, he was the Chairman of Forum of Spokespersons on Security and Response Agencies (FOSSRA) in Nigeria.

== Early life ==
Maj. Gen. Chris Olukolade was born on March 18, 1959, in Zaria, Kaduna State Northern Nigeria but his parents were from Idoani, a town in Ondo State, Southwestern Nigeria. He obtained a Bachelor of Arts degree from Obafemi Awolowo University, Ile Ife in 1983 and was commissioned into the Nigerian army as Second Lieutenant in 1982 based on the academic report of his third year in the University as a Nigerian soldier and student.
