= Magumeri ambush =

- Part of Boko Haram insurgency
Date	25 July 2017
Location	Near Magumeri, Borno State, Nigeria
Result	ISWAP victory

Belligerents
Nigeria; Civilian Joint Task Force	ISWAP

Casualties and losses
52 killed: 19 soldiers killed; 33 CJTF militiamen killed	Unknown
- 17 civilians killed, 4 POWs

On 25 July 2017, Islamic State – West Africa Province (ISWAP) militants ambushed a convoy of Nigerian soldiers and scientists from the Nigerian National Petroleum Company near the town of Magumeri, Borno State, leaving 52 soldiers and 17 civilians dead.

== Background ==
Boko Haram emerged in 2009 as a jihadist social and political movement in a failed rebellion in northeast Nigeria. Throughout the following years, Abubakar Shekau unified militant Islamist groups in the region and continued to foment the rebellion against the Nigerian government, conducting terrorist attacks and bombings in cities and communities across the region. On 7 March 2015, the group publicly declared allegiance to the Islamic State and became known as the Islamic State – West Africa Province (ISWAP).

There had been relatively few ISWAP attacks in Nigeria in 2017, and the group had been severely weakened compared to a few years prior.

== Ambush ==
On 25 July, a group of NNPC scientists and geologists from the University of Maiduguri returning from oil exploration on Lake Chad in a convoy of ten vehicles were ambushed by ISWAP fighters outside of the village of Magumeri. The following day, the Nigerian Army announced a rescue operation that claimed to have found and rescued some geologists, but also discovered the bodies of the ambush victims. Initially, the Nigerian government announced nine soldiers and one civilian were killed. Three days later on 28 July, medical and humanitarian sources said that at least 50 people were killed among soldiers and civilians. On 29 July, a humanitarian worker who worked in recovering the bodies said that 69 people were killed in the ambush; 19 soldiers, 33 Civilian Joint Task Force militiamen, and 17 civilians. One victim was found in Geidam, having walked until he collapsed of his injuries.

== Aftermath ==
A few days after the ambush, ISWAP released a video of three men from the University of Maiduguri calling on the Nigerian government to meet ISWAP's ransom for their release. The victims said that they were held by the ISWAP faction of Abu Musab al-Barnawi. A spokesman for the university said that two academics and a driver were killed, and one other was still missing.
