= Civilian Joint Task Force =

Nigerian paramilitary group

- Founded: 2013; 13 years ago
- Country: Nigeria
- Allegiance: Government of Nigeria
- Branch: Ground militia
- Type: Militia; Military reserve force
- Role: Counter-insurgency; Defense operations
- Part of: Nigerian Army
- Nickname: ʼyan Gora
- Engagements: Boko Haram insurgency Nigerian bandit conflict

Commanders
- National Chairman: Kailani Muhammad

The Civilian Joint Task Force (CJTF), also known interchangeably by the Hausa language term ʼyan Gora (“people with sticks”) is a paramilitary organization organized by the Government of Nigeria, whose primary functions include providing intelligence, participating in search and rescue operations, and engaging in direct combat against insurgents. Volunteers from local communities are organized into units, often equipped with basic weapons and training provided by the military. The vigilante group numbers over 26,000 in the northeastern Borno and Yobe States, of which only 1,800 receive a salary ($50 per month). The CJTF has suffered about 1,773 casualties in the conflict, counting both lost and missing members.

The CJTF has been accused of abuses, including slaughtering men beside a mass grave, diverting food destined for starving families and beating men and subjecting women and girls to systematic sexual violence in camps.

== History ==
It was founded in Maiduguri, Borno State, Nigeria, in 2008. It was established in response to the Boko Haram insurgency, aimed at assisting the Nigerian military in combating the group. Their work is crucial in supporting military efforts and enhancing security in affected areas.

== Structure and Organization ==
The CJTF is composed mainly of local volunteers who are familiar with the terrain and the communities they protect. These volunteers work alongside the Nigerian military and other security forces. The organization is structured to include various units responsible for different operational tasks, such as intelligence gathering, surveillance, and community patrols. The task force is typically organized at the local level, with each unit reporting to a regional commander who coordinates with military officials.

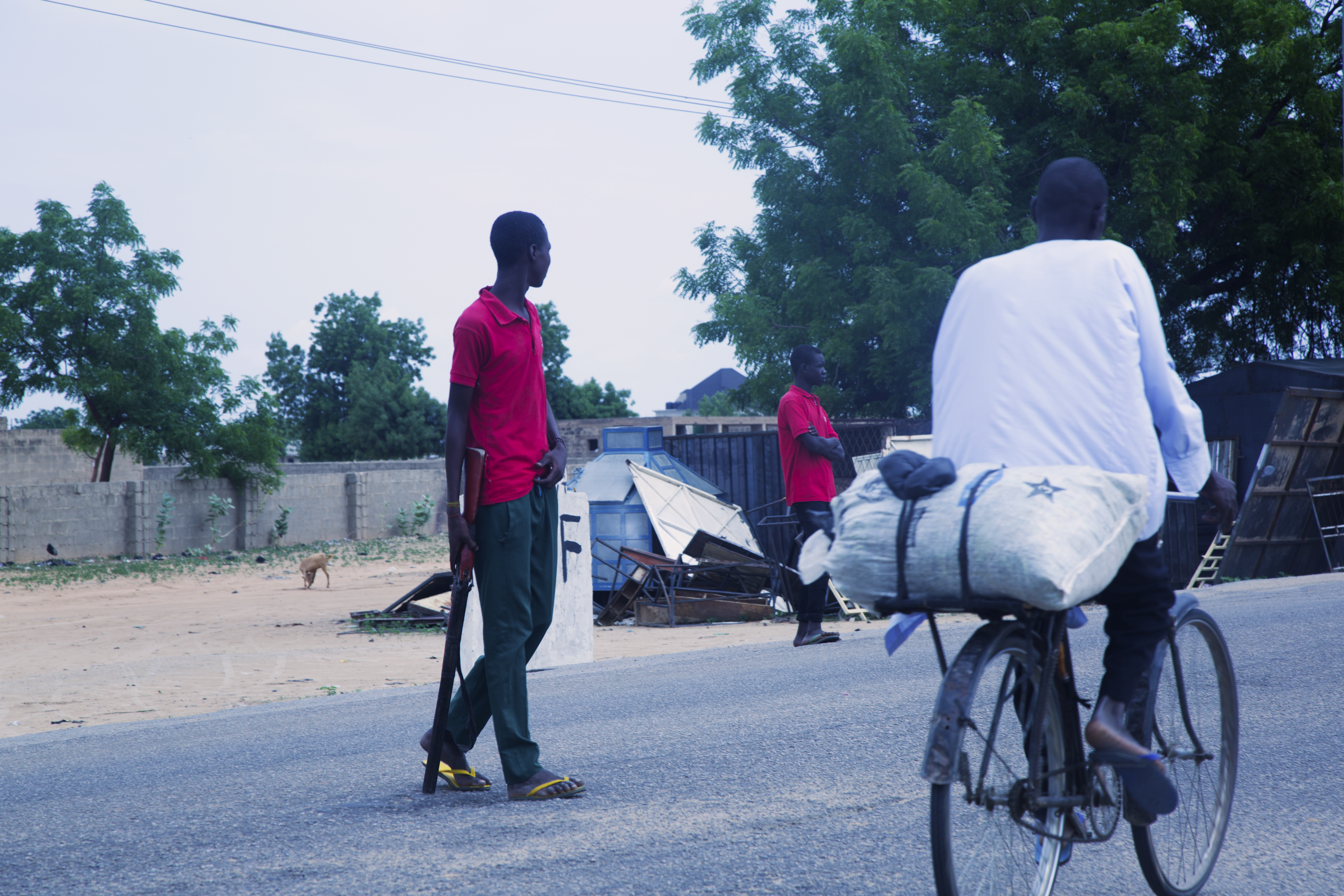
CJTF members in Maiduguri

== Roles and Responsibilities ==
The CJTF has the following mandates:

- Intelligence Gathering: CJTF members provide crucial intelligence on the movements and activities of insurgent groups. Their local knowledge enables them to gather information that might be inaccessible to external forces.
- Community Protection: The task force conducts patrols and maintains a presence in vulnerable communities to deter insurgent attacks and provide security for local populations.
- Support to Military Operations: CJTF members assist the Nigerian military in various operations, including raids and checkpoints. They provide logistical support and help in the identification of insurgent hideouts.
- Humanitarian Assistance: The CJTF has also been involved in providing humanitarian aid to displaced persons and affected communities, including distributing food and medical supplies.

== Controversies ==
The CJTF is commonly pointed out for committing human rights abuses like murder, extrajudicial killings, extortion, looting, rape, and the use of child soldiers during its operations. While the CJTF has been praised for its contributions to the fight against Boko Haram, it has faced several challenges and controversies. Issues include allegations of financial problems, logistical difficulties, and occasional conflicts with the military over coordination and operational control. Despite these challenges, the CJTF remains a crucial component of Nigeria's counter-insurgency strategy.

Some efforts like the training given by agencies like United Nations Development Programme about human rights and better function in civilian life, try to reduce the cases abuses.

== Impact ==
The CJTF has been instrumental in supporting military operations and providing security in areas affected by insurgency. Its local knowledge and commitment have helped in reducing the impact of Boko Haram's attacks and stabilizing affected communities. The task force's efforts have also contributed to the broader goal of restoring peace and security in northeastern Nigeria.
