= Ivy Uche Okoronkwo =

Deputy Inspector General of Nigerian Police

Deputy Inspector General of Police (Nigeria)
- In office October 5, 2010 – January 25, 2012

Personal details
- Born: Abia State, Nigeria
- Party: Non partisian

Ivy Uche Okoronkwo // , Ivy Okoronkwo was a Deputy Inspector General of Police (DIG) in the Nigerian Police. She was also the second in command to the then Inspector General of Police Mr. Hafiz Ringim. When she was appointed a DIG in Nigerian Police on 5 October 2010, she became the 5th female to be appointed a DIG. When she was an Assistant Inspector General of Police (AIG) and posted to head Zone 7, she was also the first female officer to head a zonal command. When she was Commissioner of Police (CP) in charge of Ekiti State, Nigeria, she was also the first female police officer to be posted to head a state Command on the Nigerian Police.

== Education and career ==
Okoronkwo is a native of Arochukwu in Abia State, Nigeria. She enlisted in the Nigerian Police as Cadet Assistant Superintendent on 1 August 1978. Before joining the Nigerian Police, she obtained a bachelor's degree in Sociology/Criminology at the Ahmadu Bello University, Zaria in 1977. Okoronkwo was appointed the first female Commissioner of Police (CP) to head a State Command in Nigeria. She was made the Commissioner of Police for Ekiti State on 28 December 2005. She was formerly CP in charge of Police Cooperative at Force headquarters Abuja. She was further promoted to the rank of Assistant Inspector General of Police (AIG) and posted to head Zone 7 Command Abuja. In that capacity she oversees 3 State Commands including Federal Capital Territory, Niger State and Kaduna states. She also became the first woman in Nigerian Police to head a Zonal Command. On Tuesday 5 October 2010, Okoronkwo was appointed a Deputy Inspector General of Police. She was also made the second-in-command to the Inspector General of Police Mr. Hafiz Ringim.. On the 25th of January 2012, President Goodluck Jonathan approved the retirement of all serving Deputy Inspectors General of Police including Okoronkwo who was then a DIG POL 2i/c Force Headquarters, Abuja. She was retired following the appointment of Mr. Mohammed Dikko Abubakar as the new Inspector General of Police and who was junior in rank to Okoronkwo. This is according to the custom of Nigerian Police to retire any senior officer when an officer lower in rank is appointed to head the force.

== See also ==
- Hafiz Ringim
- Mohammed Dikko Abubakar
- Ogbonna Okechukwu Onovo
