= Benneth Igweh =

Nigerian police officer

Assistant Inspector General of Police
- Incumbent
- Assumed office 30 August 2024
- President: Bola Tinubu
- IGP: Kayode Egbetokun; Tunji Disu

Personal details
- Born: 7 October 1968 (age 57) Akatta, Oru East, East Central State, Nigeria (now Imo State, Nigeria)
- Occupation: Police officer

Benneth "Ben" Igweh (born 7 October 1968) is a Nigerian police officer and the Assistant Inspector General of Police. He was promoted to this position by the Police Service Commission on 30 August 2024 and was decorated by the Inspector General of Police, Kayode Egbetokun. Prior to this appointment, Benneth Igwe was the 31st Commissioner of Police in the Federal Capital Territory. He attended the senior executive course 45 at the National Institute for Policy and Strategic Studies.

== Early life and education ==
Igweh is from the Akatta, Oru East local government area in what is now Imo State. He attended the University of Nigeria, where he obtained a degree in Estate Management in July 1991. Igweh furthered his education with a Post-Graduate diploma in Finance and a Master's degree in Banking and Finance.

== Honors ==
Igweh was recognized for his contributions to addressing insecurity in the country's capital by the FCT minister, Nyesom Wike, who conferred an award on him. He was also honored with the FCT Advancement award by a non-governmental body, Parliamentary Group, and described as the "Most Creative and Oriented Man of the Year 2024".
