= Godogodo (bandit) =

Nigerian armed robber

- Abiọdun Egụ́njobi
- Born: Abiodun Egunjobi
- Other name: Abbey Godogodo
- Citizenship: Nigerian
- Occupations: Scrap collector; Armed robber
- Years active: 2003 — 2013
- Opponent: Lagos State Police Command
- Accomplices: Leke; Yinusa; Adelawo
- Time at large: 10 years

Details
- Span of crimes: 2003–2013
- Country: Nigeria
- State: Lagos state
- Location: Lagos
- Targets: Banks; Bureau de change
- Killed: Death of police officers and civilians
- Weapon: AK-47 rifles
- Date apprehended: 1 August 2013

Abiodun Egunjobi commonly known as Godogodo was a Nigerian armed robber.

== Life ==
Godogodo was a scrap dealer in Gatankowa, Abule-Egba in Lagos, Lagos state. He was arrested by the Nigerian police for causing civil unrest. Due to lack of bail, he spent six years in prison. After he was released from prison, he formed his own gang of criminals to rob. He was known to organize heists against banks and bureaux de change. He was tackled by Umar Manko of the Lagos State Police Command and DCP Abba Kyari who headed the Special Anti-Robbery Squad. His most significant robbery is said to be the Black Sunday robbery of 9 September 2012, which took the life of two police officers and seven civilians. He was arrested on 1 August 2013, in his house in Ibadan.
