= Musa Bamaiyi =

Nigerian military officer (1948–2007)

Major General Musa Bamaiyi

Chairman of the National Drug Law Enforcement Agency
- In office 1995–1998
- Preceded by: Ba'ppa jama're
- Succeeded by: Ogbonna Okechukwu Onovo

Personal details
- Born: 11 June 1948 Zuru, Northern Region, British Nigeria (now in Kebbi State, Nigeria)
- Died: 17 April 2007 (aged 58) Zuru, Nigeria
- Resting place: Zuru, Nigeria
- Relations: Ishaya Bamaiyi (brother); Danladi Bamaiyi (brother)

Military service
- Allegiance: Nigeria
- Branch/service: Nigerian Army
- Years of service: 1968–1999
- Rank: Major general

Musa Bamaiyi (11 June 1948 – 17 April 2007) was a Nigerian Army major general who headed the National Drug Law Enforcement Agency (NDLEA) from 1995 to 1998. He was older brother to former Chief of Army Staff, Lt-General Ishaya Bamaiyi. He was also acting governor of Benue State in 1984.

== NDLEA Chairman ==
The NDLEA, under Bamaiyi's tenure arrested Fela Anikulapo Kuti for the possession of illegal drugs. About 100 or more people (including minors) were arrested when the NDLEA raided Fela's popular shrine location. Bamaiyi noted that, the NDLEA tried to rehabilitate Fela during a live television broadcast where Bamaiyi and Fela disagreed on the harmful nature of Indian Hemp. Fela Kuti filed a $1.2 million lawsuit for his "unlawful arrest and detention" by the NDLEA and reportedly has an unreleased composition titled Bamaiyi, presumably about his encounter with the NDLEA and Musa Bamaiyi.

== Sibling rivalry with Ishaya Bamaiyi ==
Musa Bamaiyi reportedly feuded with his younger brother, Lt-General Ishaya Bamaiyi for years and sought redress from the Human Rights Violation Investigation Commission (HRVIC) Panel, headed by Justice Chukwudifu Oputa.

== Death ==
Musa Bamaiyi died on 17 April 2007, aged 58.
