= 1979 Borno State gubernatorial election =

1979 gubernatorial election in Borno State, Nigeria

- July 28, 1979
Nominee	Mohammed Goni	Kam Salem
Party	Great Nigeria People's Party	NPN
Running mate	Ibrahim Anas
Governor before election
Tunde Idiagbon
Nigerian military junta
Elected Governor
Mohammed Goni
GNPP

The 1979 Borno State gubernatorial election occurred on July 28, 1979. GNPP's Mohammed Goni won election for a first term to become Borno State's first executive governor, defeating main opposition NPN's Kam Salem in the contest.

Mohammed Goni emerged the GNPP candidate after being elected in absentia, defeating Abba Jiddum Gana over a wide margin. Goni polled 166 and Gana 18. Goni's running mate was Ibrahim Anas.

== Electoral system ==
The Governor of Borno State is elected using the plurality voting system.

== Results ==
There were five political parties registered by the Federal Electoral Commission (FEDECO) to participate in the election. Mohammed Goni of the GNPP won the contest by polling the highest votes, defeating NPN's Kam Salem.

Candidate	Party
Mohammed Goni	Great Nigeria People's Party (GNPP)
Kam Salem	National Party of Nigeria (NPN)
Total
Source: Yenlive
