= Olabisi Alofe-Kolawole =

Nigerian police officer

- Incumbent
- Assumed office August 2015

Personal details
- Born: Nigeria
- Education: Ogun State University; Nigeria Police Academy; University of Leicester
- Occupation: Police Officer

Olabisi Alofe Kolawole is a Nigerian police officer and also the first female Force Public Relations Officer (FPRO).

== Education ==
She is a Law graduate of Ogun State University and a graduate of Nigeria Police Academy. She obtained her master's degree in police leadership and management (PLM) from the University of Leicester, United Kingdom (UK). She was called to the Nigerian Bar in 2002 and was also an investigator assisting the office of the prosecutor at the International Criminal Court (ICC) at The Hague in the investigations of Sexual and Gender-Based Violence as international crimes.

== Career ==
In August 2015, Olabisi Kolawole was appointed as the new force public relations officer by inspector general of police, Solomon Arase. This made her the first female police officer to be appointed as National Police Force spokesperson.

She has formerly served as the police force gender adviser and deputy director of the Directorate of Peacekeeping. She had also served at the international level;and these include serving in the United Nations missions in East-Timor (2000), Kosovo (2004), Liberia (2006), and the UN headquarters in New York (2007).
