= Tunji Disu =

Nigerian inspector-general of police (born 1966)

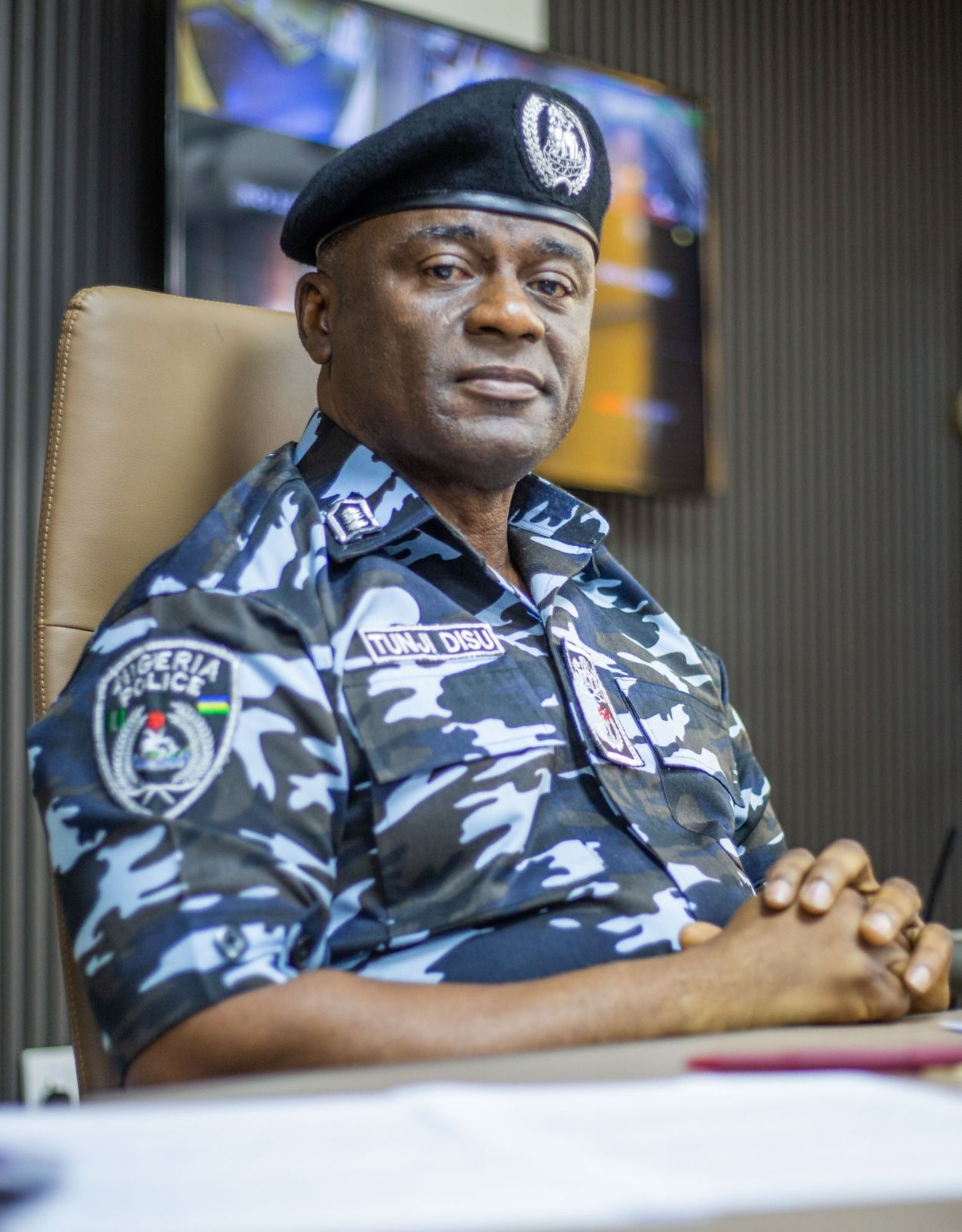

Inspector General of Police
- Incumbent
- Assumed office 24 February 2026
- Preceded by: Kayode Egbetokun

Federal Capital Territory Commissioner of Police
- In office 7 October 2024 – 25 March 2025
- Preceded by: Benneth Igweh
- Succeeded by: Ajao Adewale

Rivers State Commissioner of Police
- In office 9 November 2023 – 7 October 2024
- Preceded by: Emeka Nwonyi
- Succeeded by: Mustapha Bala

Head of Police's Intelligence Response Team (IGP-IRT)
- In office 2 August 2021 – 28 March 2023
- Preceded by: Abba Kyari

Commander of Lagos State Rapid Response Squad (RRS Commander)
- In office 13 June 2015 – 2 August 2021
- Succeeded by: Saheed Egbeyemi

Personal details
- Born: 13 April 1966 (age 60) Lagos Island, Lagos, Nigeria
- Education: Lagos State University; Adekunle Ajasin University
- Occupation: Police officer

Military service
- Allegiance: Nigeria
- Branch/service: Nigeria Police Force
- Rank: Inspector General of Police

Olatunji Rilwan Disu (born 13 April 1966) is a Nigerian police officer who has served as the 23rd Inspector General of Police of Nigeria since 2026. He was appointed by President Bola Ahmed Tinubu to replace Kayode Egbetokun who resigned in February 2026. He previously served as the Commissioner of Police of the Federal Capital Territory from 2024 to 2025 and as the Commissioner of Police in Rivers State from 2023 till his redeployment to the FCT in 2024.

Disu is a member of the International Association of Chiefs of Police, and the former head of the Intelligence Response Team (IRT) of the Police Force in Nigeria, the position previously held by Abba Kyari. He is a graduate of English Education from Lagos State University (LASU) and a holder of two master's degrees, one in Public Administration from Adekunle Ajasin University, Ondo State and the other in Criminology, Security, and Legal Psychology from Lagos State University.

== Education and training ==
Olatunji Rilwan Disu was born in Lagos Island, Lagos State on 13 April 1966, he attended Holy Cross Cathedral primary school and completed his primary school education at Mayflower Junior School in Ikenne, Ogun State in 1979. He also went on to Pobuna Secondary Grammar School in Epe, and St Gregory's College, Lagos where he finished his secondary education in 1985.

He later gained admission to study English (Education) at the Lagos State University where he graduated with a bachelor's degree in English Education in 1990. He obtained a post-graduate Diploma in International Relations and Strategic Studies from Lagos State University, and a certificate in Personal Protection from the United Kingdom.

Disu holds two master's degrees in Public Administration and also in Criminology, Security, and Legal Psychology from Adekunle Ajasin University, Akungba (2010) and Lagos State University (2022) respectively.

He has also attended different professional courses within and outside Nigeria including Small Arms Smuggling Training in Botswana, Internet Fraud Training at the University of Cambridge, United Kingdom, Strategic Leadership Command Course at the Police Staff College, Jos, Forensic Investigations and Criminal Intelligence Course at the University of Lagos, amongst others.

== Career ==
Disu joined the Nigeria Police on 18 May 1992. He has served as Divisional Police Officer (DPO) in several divisions of the Nigerian Police Force in Ago-Iwoye (Ogun State), Ikare (Ondo State), Owo (Ondo State), Elimbu and Elelenwo, in Rivers State.

He was also Officer in Charge of the Special Anti-Robbery Squad (SARS) and anti-kidnapping in Rivers State and was SARS commander in Ondo, Oyo and Rivers State. He was also second in command (2IC) State Criminal Investigations Department (CID), Rivers State.

In 2005, as contingent commander, he led the first-ever Nigerian Police contingent on African Union Mission in Sudan (AMIS) on a peacekeeping mission. While in Darfur, he was appointed the acting Chief of Staff until his return to Nigeria in 2006.

He served as the commander of the Lagos State Rapid Respond Squad (RRS) from 13 June 2015 to 2 August 2021. While in RRS, Disu named his officers ‘The Good Guys’, a move that helped reform officers to enforce the law responsibly yet remain friendly to citizens while carrying out their activities.

Under Disu, the RRS provided its services through a partnership-based and proactive problem-solving style of policing, focusing on community engagement, crime prevention and law enforcement. The RRS equally made effective use of crime mapping and hot spot policing, which resulted in the visible positioning of police patrol vehicles for crime reduction across Lagos.

The RRS in return enjoyed the cooperation and admiration of Lagosians. The officers reportedly render help to drivers of broken down vehicles and assist accident victims. In 2020, Disu's officers took a woman in labour to the hospital during the COVID-19 lockdown in Lagos.

Disu's officers operated with an unusual mindset and adhered to the concept of policing by consent similar to advanced countries. The RRS officers were trained in the administration of First Aid and CPR, which was put to use when treating citizens in emergencies.

Disu served as the Deputy Commissioner of Police, Department of Operations, Force Headquarters, Abuja. On 2 August 2021, inspector-general of police Usman Alkali Baba appointed Disu as the new head of the Intelligence Response Team (IRT), a position previously held by Abba Kyari.

In July 2022, IGP Alkali Baba commended the Disu-led Force Intelligence Bureau Intelligence Response Squad (FIB-IRT) for recent successes, which includes the arrest of a fraud syndicate specialized in breaching bank accounts of individuals and corporate bodies. DCP Tunji Disu was promoted to the rank of Commissioner of Police in March 2023 by the Nigerian Police Service Commission.

In February 2026, President Bola Ahmed Tinubu appointed Disu as the Acting Inspector General Police succeeding Kayode Egbetokun after his resignation.

== Membership ==
Disu is a member of various local and international professional bodies including; the International Association of Chiefs of Police, the Nigerian Institute of Public Relations (NIPR), Chartered Institute of Personnel and Development (CIPM), International Institute of Certified Forensics Investigation Professionals, International Academy of Forensics and the National Association of Investigative Specialist, US (NAIS).

== Judo ==
Disu won a silver medal at the 33rd U.S. Open Judo Championship on 31 July 2022, where he contested in the minus 100 kg category of the veteran division. He is a third dan black belter in Judo with many medals. Since becoming a judoka in 1986, he has won one gold medal at the national sports festival in 1990 in Bauchi, two gold medals at the Nigerian police games and a silver medal at the armed forces and police games. In November 2021, Disu won another gold medal at the first veteran championships organised by the Nigerian police.

He is formerly the Chairman of Lagos State Judo Association and currently the patron of the Nigerian Police Judo Association.

== EndSars ==
During the End SARS protests against police brutality in 2020, it was reported that Disu, then head of the Police Rapid Response Squad (RRS), Lagos State, released his command's ambulances to help protesters in need of medical care.

== Controversy ==
At the time of his appointment as IGP-IRT, it was reported that Disu was born on 17 April 1960, a report debunked by Frank Mba, the Police Force public relations officers (FPRO).

== Awards ==
- Under his watch, the RRS of Lagos Police Command received the best anti-crime police squad award in West Africa, by Security Watch Africa (SWA) in 2016
- Most outstanding police operational officer in West Africa. (RRS Commander, Olatunji Disu, an Assistant Commissioner of Police) in 2016.
- Lagos was named the best security and most safety-conscious state in Africa by the Security Watch Africa (SWA) in Johannesburg, in 2016.
- In 2019, Olatunji Disu, (Commander RRS) won the Most Outstanding Anti-Crime Police Chief in the West and Central Africa category, while the unit was awarded the Most Outstanding Urban Crime Control Police Command in West and Central Africa.
- 2019 Man of the Year Award by Crime Reporters Association of Nigeria (CRAN)
