= Mike Mbama Okiro =

Former inspector general of the Nigeria Police Force

13th Inspector General of Police
- In office 2007–2009
- Preceded by: Sunday Ehindero
- Succeeded by: Ogbonna Okechukwu Onovo

Personal details
- Born: 24 July 1949 Oguta, Imo State
- Education: University of Jos
- Occupation: Police officer, lawyer

Sir Mike Mbama Okiro was the Inspector General of the Nigeria Police Force from 2007 to 2009.

== Background ==
Mike Okiro was born on 24 July 1949 in Oguta, Imo State and hails from Egbema in Ogba/Egbema/Ndoni Local Government Area of Rivers State. He is the Agunechemba I of Egbema, and Nigeria's first ethnic Igbo to assume the post of Police Inspector General. He holds a degree in English Language from the University of Ibadan, a Masters of Public Administration from the University of Lagos and an LLB and LLM from the University of Jos. He also holds Honorary Doctorate Degrees from the Federal University of Technology, Owerri, Imo State and Novena University, Delta State. He is an Alumnus of the prestigious National Institute of Policy and Strategic Studies (NIPSS), Kuru Plateau State.

== Career ==
He joined the Nigerian Police in 1977. Operational and command positions include serving as DPO in several police stations, Member, Armed Robbery & Firearms Tribunal, Lagos State, Assistant & Deputy Commissioner of Police (operations), Lagos State and later Benue State. He received a double promotion from Commissioner of Police when he became Deputy Inspector-General of Police. In June 2009, Okiro released a book titled "Policing Nigeria in a Democracy".

On assumption of office as the Inspector-General of Police, he worked to provide secure environment for the actualization of the President's vision of placing Nigeria among the world's top 20 economies by the year 2020. He created a channel of communication as a tool of bridging the Police-Public divide; the philosophy that gave birth to THE DAWN newspaper. He reinstated a number of officers who had been forced into early retirement and also made police service more open, receptive and responsive to troubled spots in the country the results of which all Nigerians are living witnesses and promised to provide improved pay, housing and equipment to the police. In October 2008, Okiro spoke on the responsibilities of the press, saying reporters should avoid sensationalism and should investigate any story carefully before reporting it. In February 2009 he stated that banks neglected security in their branches because they had insurance coverage.

In November 2008 and again in February 2009, the Chairman of the House Committee on Police Affairs, Abdul Ahmed Ningi, asked Kiro to provide details of the money recovered from the former Inspector-General of Police Tafa Balogun, a request that he passed on to the Economic and Financial Crimes Commission (EFCC) Chairman, Farida Waziri. The EFCC stated that they did not have records of the exact properties recovered from Balogun.

In April 2009, Ayoke Adebayo, Resident Electoral Commissioner of Ekiti State, wrote a letter to President Umaru Musa Yar'Adua resigning from the Independent National Electoral Commission (INEC) saying she would not yield to pressure to change election results in her state. Mike Mbama Okiro declared that she must make herself available to the Nigeria Police within 24hours.

Okiro headed a five-man inter-agency panel to investigate the $190 million Halliburton scandal in which it was alleged that KBR, a subsidiary of Halliburton, had distributed bribes to politicians and officials to gain construction contracts from Nigeria Liquefied Natural Gas. In July 2009 it was found that a key suspect, Abdulakadir Abacha, cousin of former military ruler General Sani Abacha, might have fled the country. President Yar’Adua ordered an interim report to ensure that the panel was not compromised or influenced during a planned visit abroad. Although Abdulkadir Abacha was never caught, President Yar’Adua congratulated Okiro on his retirement at age 60 in July 2009, for his achievements while in the IGP Office.

On May 22, 2015, Aaron Kaase, a Principal Admin Officer (Press and Public Relations) of the Police Service Commission complained to the Economic and Financial Crimes Commission (EFCC), as well as the Independent Corrupt Practices and Related Offences Commission (ICPC), detailing acts of corruption against Okiro, in which he allegedly swindled the Police Service Commission of over N275 million. The ICPC investigated and cleared Okiro of all criminal infractions.

== Post-retirement ==
He retired form the Nigeria Police Force on 24 July 2009 upon reaching the mandatory retirement age of 60.

Speaking in August 2009 after a farewell parade in his honour in Abuja, Okiro spoke of problems with the system where the IGP does not have the authority to fulfill his responsibilities. He also said, "The unkindest cut is the attack of a public officer after he has left office with the unholy belief that he is no longer in a position to defend himself."

Okiro is married with children and enjoys playing chess and writing in his spare time.

== Literary works ==
Okiro has authored five books of different genres:

- Peace and the Nation;
- Surviving the Cities;
- The Legal implications of the Mismanagement of Public Funds in Nigeria;
- Policing Nigeria in a Democracy
- Overcoming Security Challenges

== Appointed by President Jonathan as Chairman of The Police Service Commission ==
On May 8, 2013, President Goodluck Jonathan nominated Okiro as the chairman of the Police Service Commission. Senate President David Mark confirmed Okiro's appointment after a senate confirmation hearing.
