= Onovo =

Onovo is a Nigerian surname. Notable people with the surname include:

- Ogbonna Okechukwu Onovo (born 1953), Nigerian police officer
- Vincent Onovo (born 1995), Nigerian footballer
