= Hush puppies =

Hush puppies may refer to:

- Hushpuppy, a southern U.S. food
- Hush Puppies, a footwear brand
- HushPuppies, a musical group
- Basset Hound, the dog breed used in advertising for Hush Puppies footwear
- A version of the Smith & Wesson Model 39 firearm equipped with a suppressor and used by commandos in Vietnam to kill sentries during raids
- Hush Puppy, a character in the children's series Lamb Chop's Play-Along

== See also ==
- Slush Puppie
- Hushpuppi, one of several aliases of Ramon Abbas (born 1982), Nigerian fraudster and money launderer
