= Oyin =

Oyin may refer to:

== People ==
- Oyin Adejobi (1926–2000), Nigerian chief, actor, and dramatist
- Oyin Oladejo (born c.1985), Nigerian-born Canadian actress

== Places ==
- Oyin-Akoko, a settlement in Nigeria
