= Suleiman Abba =

Nigerian police officer

17th Inspector General of Police
- In office 1 August 2014 – 20 April 2015
- Preceded by: Mohammed Dikko Abubakar
- Succeeded by: Solomon Arase

Personal details
- Born: 22 March 1959 (age 67) Gwaram, Jigawa State, Nigeria
- Education: NIPSS; University of Jos; University of Abuja; London School of Economics
- Occupation: Police Officer

Suleiman Abba (born 22 March 1959) is a retired Nigerian police officer who served as the 17th Inspector General of Nigerian Police. He was appointed as acting IGP on 1 August 2014 by President Goodluck Jonathan and later confirmed as substantive IGP on 4 November 2014. Before the appointment, Abba was serving as the Assistant Inspector-General in Charge of Zone 7, Abuja. IGP, Suleiman Abba was sacked 21 April 2015 because of noticeable indiscipline in the Nigerian Police Force in the buildup to the 2015 general election

== Life and career ==
Abba was born on 22 March 1959 in Gwaram of Jigawa State Northwestern Nigeria. He obtained B.A degree in history from University of Jos,

He was recruited into the Nigerian police in December 1984 and rose through ranks to become AIG in February 2012.

Abba has worked in various capacities while in Police service. He served as Commissioner of Police in Lagos and Rivers States and was at one time, Assistant Inspector-General of Police in charge of Zone 7 Abuja. He also once served as Aide-De-Camp (ADC) to Maryam Abacha, spouse of Nigeria's former military leader, Sani Abacha.
