= 1983 Borno State gubernatorial election =

1983 gubernatorial election in Borno State, Nigeria

- August 13, 1983
Nominee	Asheik Jarma
Party	NPN
Elected Governor
Asheik Jarma
NPN

The 1983 Borno State gubernatorial election occurred on August 13, 1983. NPN candidate Asheik Jarma won the election.

== Results ==
Asheik Jarma representing NPN won the election. The election held on August 13, 1983.
