= Adamu Suleiman =

Nigerian policeman and Inspector General

4th Inspector General of Police
- In office 1979–1981
- Preceded by: Muhammadu Dikko Yusufu
- Succeeded by: Sunday Adewusi

Personal details
- Born: 14 May 1929 Jimeta, Adamawa, Nigeria Protectorate
- Died: 23 May 2005 (aged 76)

Adamu Suleiman (born 14 May 1929) was a Nigerian policeman who served as Inspector General. He was appointed in 1979 to succeed Muhammadu Dikko Yusufu and was succeeded by Sunday Adewusi in 1981.

Suleiman attended Jimeta Elementary School between 1940 and 1944, followed by Yola Middle School until 1947. He then became a student at Barewa College in Zaria from 1947 to 1950, and the College of Technology in Zaria between 1954 and 1956. He then attended the University of Ibadan, from where he graduated with honours in Modern History in 1960.

Suleiman was seconded into the Nigeria Police Force on 1 May 1966 as a deputy commissioner of police.

Adamu Suleman was promoted to the rank of Inspector General of Police in October 1979 and served under President Shehu Shagari's second Republic until his retirement from the police force in April 1981.
