= Abba Kyari (police) =

Nigerian police officer

- Born: 17 March 1975 (age 51); Maiduguri, Borno State, Nigeria
- Education: University of Maiduguri
- Occupation: Police officer
- Police career
- Department: Lagos State Police Command, Nigeria Police Force
- Branch: Intelligence Response Team
- Awards: National Police Medal (2013)

Abba Alhaji Kyari (born 17 March 1975) is a former Nigerian police officer who was a Deputy Commissioner of Police currently on suspension and relieved from all police duties pending the outcome of an internal investigation into his alleged connection with popular alleged fraudster Ramon "Hushpuppi" Abbas. He was a member of the International Association of Chiefs of Police (IACP). Prior to his appointment as IGP-IRT, he served at Lagos State Police Command as a unit Commander in one of the PMF bases located in Lagos before he was promoted and transferred to serve as the Officer-In-Charge of the dis-banded Special Anti-Robbery Squad (SARS).

== Involvement with Hushpuppi ==
On 29 July 2021, infamous Nigerian fraudster (Ramon Abbas) popularly known as Hushpuppi, who is currently serving an 11 years prison sentence in the United States for money laundering and cybercrimes, implicated Kyari as a party in an international scheme to defraud a Qatari school founder and then launder over $1.1 million in illicit proceeds.

A 69 page court document outlined a dispute among members of the crime syndicate which allegedly prompted one Vincent to contact the victim and claim that Abbas and Juma (also a fraudster) were engaged in fraud. After this, Abbas allegedly arranged to have Vincent jailed in Nigeria by Kyari. The document further provided that Kyari allegedly sent Abbas account details into which he could deposit payment for Vincent's arrest and imprisonment.

A report by Peoples Gazette highlighted how Kyari travelled to Dubai on the invitation of Hushpuppi and was treated to a good time with airport pickup, luxury hotel accommodation and city tour.

Kyari, however, disputed these serious allegations leveled against him via his verified Instagram and Facebook accounts. A report by Peoples Gazette showed that the United States Department of Justice had issued a warrant of arrest and ordered Kyari's extradition. The IGP however suspended him pending the report from the committee in charge of investigation.

== Suspension ==
On 1 August 2021, the Inspector General of Police announced the suspension of Kyari from duty pending the determination of investigation of his involvement in the Hushpuppi fraud.

In December 2021, the Inspector-General of Police, Usman Baba, submitted the probe panel report on Kyari to the Police Service Commission.

== Cocaine deal allegation ==
On 14 February 2022, a video clip of Kyari was exposed where he negotiated the release of some quantity of seized 25 kg cocaine, and offered $61,400 cash.

On 7 March 2022, Kyari and six others were arraigned by the NDLEA on several charges bordering on conspiracy, obstruction and dealing in cocaine. However, Kyari and four others, who are police officers as well, pleaded not guilty to the charges brought against them by the anti-narcotics agency.

In May 2024, Abba Kyari was released on bail from the Kuje Custodial Centre in the Federal Capital Territory after spending 27 months in detention.

As of April 2025, the case continues with the judge declining to quash it following submissions filed by Kyari and his co-defendants.
