= Oyin-Akoko =

Oyin Akoko
- Town
- Location in Nigeria
- Coordinates (NG): 7°40′24″N 5°45′24″E
- Country: Nigeria
- State: Ondo State
- LGA: Akoko North-West

Government
  - Type: Traditional
  - Traditional Ruler: Oloyin of Oyin
  - Traditional Ruler: Oloyin of Oyin

Population
  - Ethnicity: Yoruba
  - Religion: Christianity Islam Yoruba religion
- Time zone: UTC+1 (WAT)
- Postcode: 342104

Oyin Akoko is a settlement in Akoko North-West Local government area of Ondo State, Nigeria. It lies 251 km southeast of Abuja, the Nigerian capital. The closest airport to Oyin Akoko is located at Akure 68 km to the north-west. The Yoruba language is spoken in the town.

== Economy ==
The inhabitants are predominantly farmers of food and cash crops such as yam, cassava, cocoa, kolanut, coffee, cocoyam, plantain, and maize.

== Educational institutions ==
There are three public primary schools in Oyin Akoko. These are St. John's Anglican School, Baptist Day School and Ansar Ud Deen Muslim School. There are also a number of other private schools. Eyo Oke Comprehensive High School is the prime secondary school in Oyin founded in 1978.

Also located in Oyin Akoko is the Ondo State Police Training College which was established during the tenure of Sunday Ehindero as the Nigeria's Inspector General of Police.

== Festivals ==
Once in nine years an age group festival called AsoEgbe is celebrated in the town. It is an initiation ceremony for boys passing into manhood. It is marked by fanfare and traditional and customary rites. Apart from this, there are yearly sectional traditional festivals held in each of the wards of Igoho (Ayinyan) and Uhon (Ehe).

== Health facilities ==
There is a community basic health centre established and run by the government. There are also some private clinics and health facilities. The nearest general/specialist hospital is in Ikare, a neighbouring town.

== Notable people ==
- Ifeoluwa Ehindero Honourable Representing Akoko North East/North West of the Federal Constituency.
