= Chris Igwe =

Nigerian entrepreneur

Dr. Prince Chris Igwe OFR
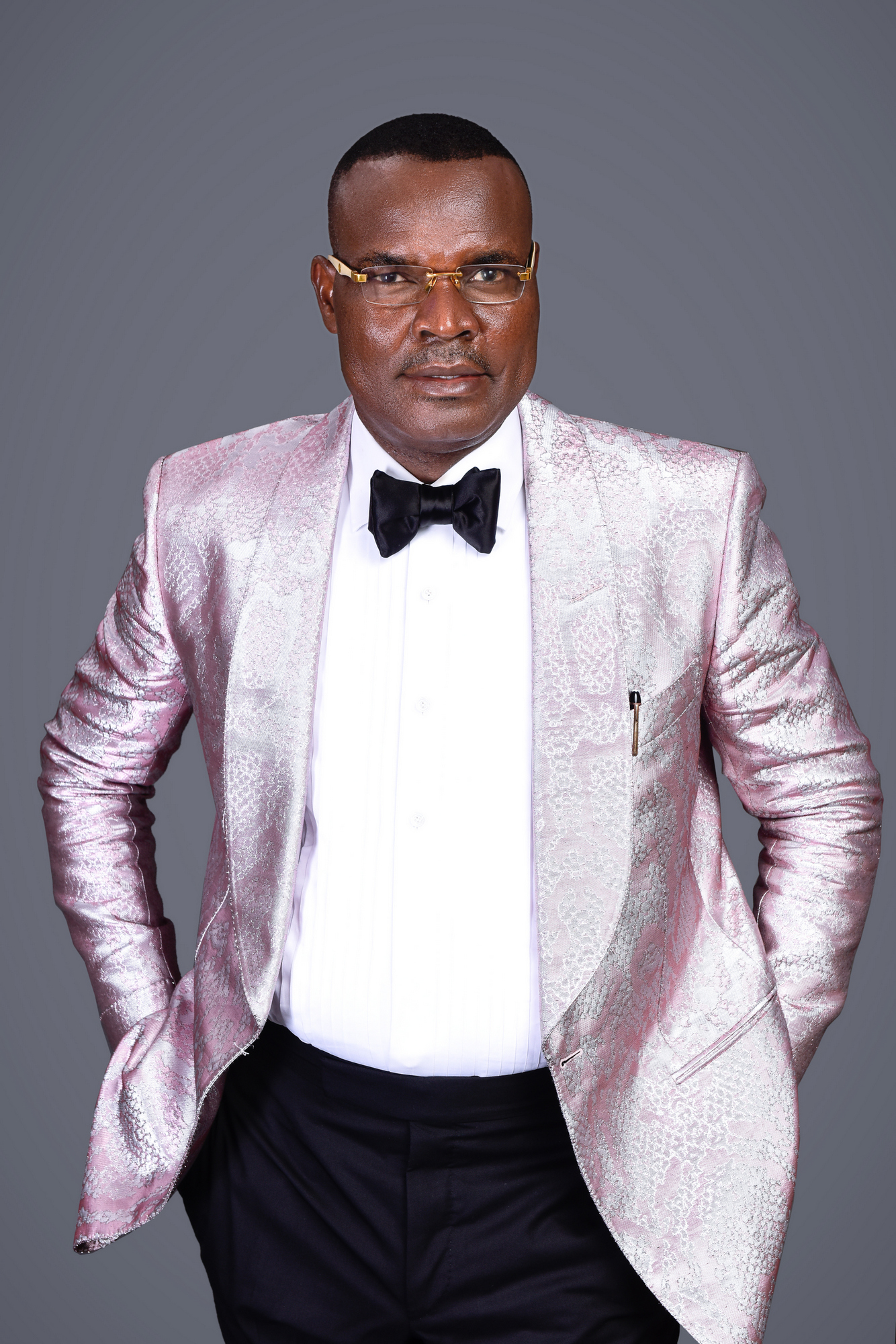
- Born: Chris Odinaka Igwe; 16 February 1970 (age 56); Umu-Nneochi, Abia State
- Citizenship: Nigeria
- Education: Federal Polytechnic, Oko, Lagos State University, Lagos Business School, Harvard Business School, US
- Organizations: MD/CEO of Mainland Oil and Gas Company limited and; Chairman Chrisnak Group of Companies
- Awards: The Sun Investor of the year 2020
- Honours: 2022 Officer of the Order of the Federal Republic

Prince Chris Odinaka Igwe ^{OFR} is a Nigerian entrepreneur. He is the managing director and chief executive officer of Mainland Oil and Gas Company Limited and the chairman of Chrisnak Groups Limited. He is also a recipient of the officer of Order of the Federal Republic National Award.

== Early life and education ==
Chris Igwe was born on 16 February 1970 in Umunneochi Local Government Area of Abia State. He bagged the Ordinary National Diploma from the Federal Polytechnic, Oko, Anambra State in 1996. In 2015, he graduated from Lagos State University where he was awarded a Bachelor of Science degree in Public Administration. In 2016, he graduated from Lagos Business School where he was awarded the post graduate certificate on Owner Manager Programme. In 2019, he bagged an Honorary Doctor of Science degree in Human Resources from the Wesley University, Ondo State and he is also an alumnus of Harvard Business School, US where he was awarded a post graduate certificate in Owner President Management Course.

== Business career ==
Chris Igwe started his career at Nanac Enterprises Limited, Owerri as a freelance salesman and he eventually rose to the position of general manager. In 1992, he started his first company Chrisnak Conglomerate – a trading company with only N10,000 capital and developed it into a big company before diversifying to shipping and freight-forwarding and logistics. Later, Igwe founded other companies including, Mainland Oil and Gas operating in downstream, midstream and upstream oil and gas sector with a subsidiary, Newcore International Energy Limited focused on trading and operating tank-farm for storage of petroleum products in the down-stream sector; Chrisnak International Shipping Company Limited that provide maritime and logistics support to the parent company and other clients. Other companies include Chrisnak Industries Limited focused on production of polymerizing vinyl chloride and lubricants, Chrisnak Properties Limited offering real estate services and Chrisnak Farms Limited which cultivated a 150-hectare cashew plantation in Isuochi, Umunneochi, Abia State to support national policy of diversification from oil economy to agriculture and production.

On May 27, 2024, Nigerian police, acting on a complaint from Igwe, arrested Precious Eze Chukwunonso, a journalist and the publisher of the online news outlet News Platform, who had been writing articles about Igwe. The reporter was charged with "conduct likely to cause breach of peace, provoking a breach of the peace by offensive publication and conspiracy to commit felony." If found guilty, he would face up to two years imprisonment.

International press freedom organizations, including the Committee to Protect Journalists and the International Federation of Journalists, condemned Igwe's complaint against the reporter, and the police's arrest, as a precedent of Nigeria's business elite restricting the country's free press. Chukwunonso had published an article, based on witness testimony, alleging that Igwe, after being startled by a dog in his upscale Lagos neighborhood had "reportedly panicked" then tripped and fell. "Seemingly incensed by the incident, Prince Igwe returned shortly thereafter with an armed companion, unleashing a volley of gunshots towards" the dog's perceived owner, the article had stated.

== Awards and honours ==
Chris Igwe received the award of the investor of the year from The Sun newspaper in 2020 and in 2022 he received the Nigeria National award, the officer of the Order of the Federal Republic
