= Katsina Vocational Training Center =

KVTC
- Katsina Vocational Training Center
- Formation: September 1, 2000; 26 years ago
- Founder: MD Yusuf
- Founded at: Katsina
- Headquarters: Katsina

Katsina Vocational Training Centre is a non-governmental vocational training and youth empowerment organization based in Katsina, Nigeria. The center was established in the year 2000 by the late Inspector General of Police, Muhammadu Dikko Yusufu (commonly referred to as M.D. Yusuf), to combat youth unemployment and promote self-reliance through skill acquisition. The center is now considered as one of the successful vocational training center in Nigeria.

== History ==
MD Yusufu established the center to empower vulnerable youth, women, physically challenged individuals, and inmates across all 34 local government areas of Katsina State. The Centre intentionally targets demoralized young people, offering them vocational training and rehabilitation to foster self-reliance. The center locates at MD Yusuf Street, Kerau Quarters, Katsina, it provides training under a visionary framework set by M.D. Yusuf himself.

According to Aristocracy Rebel: A Biography of M.D. Yusufu (2006), the idea for what later became the Katsina Vocational Training Center emerged in 2002 after a Katsina-based journalist, Danjuma, alerted M.D. Yusufu to rising youth drug abuse, political rivalry, and recurring arrests of young addicts by the National Drug Law Enforcement Agency. Concerned that the growing social crisis required rehabilitation rather than repeated punishment, Yusufu encouraged Danjuma to design a remedial programme, which initially carried the proposed name “M.D. Yusufu Vocational Center” before Yusufu advised adopting the neutral name “Katsina Vocational Center.” The centre began modestly with about ₦400,000, volunteer instructors, and training in small-scale skills such as making footmats, yoghurt, ointments, and candles, while also providing start-up materials and later admitting persons with disabilities. Its approach included an initial phase of psychological reorientation to help trainees build confidence. The centre’s early success attracted attention beyond Katsina, with other state governments visiting to understudy the model.

A notable legacy is the daily library period, which he personally mandated to instil a culture of literacy and lifelong learning among trainees. As at 2018, KVTC has empowered over 11,900 individuals, including 2,770 inmates at the NDLEA facility and 870 at Katsina Correctional Centre, all sourced from across the state. These efforts significantly reduce dependence on government jobs and help curb insecurity.

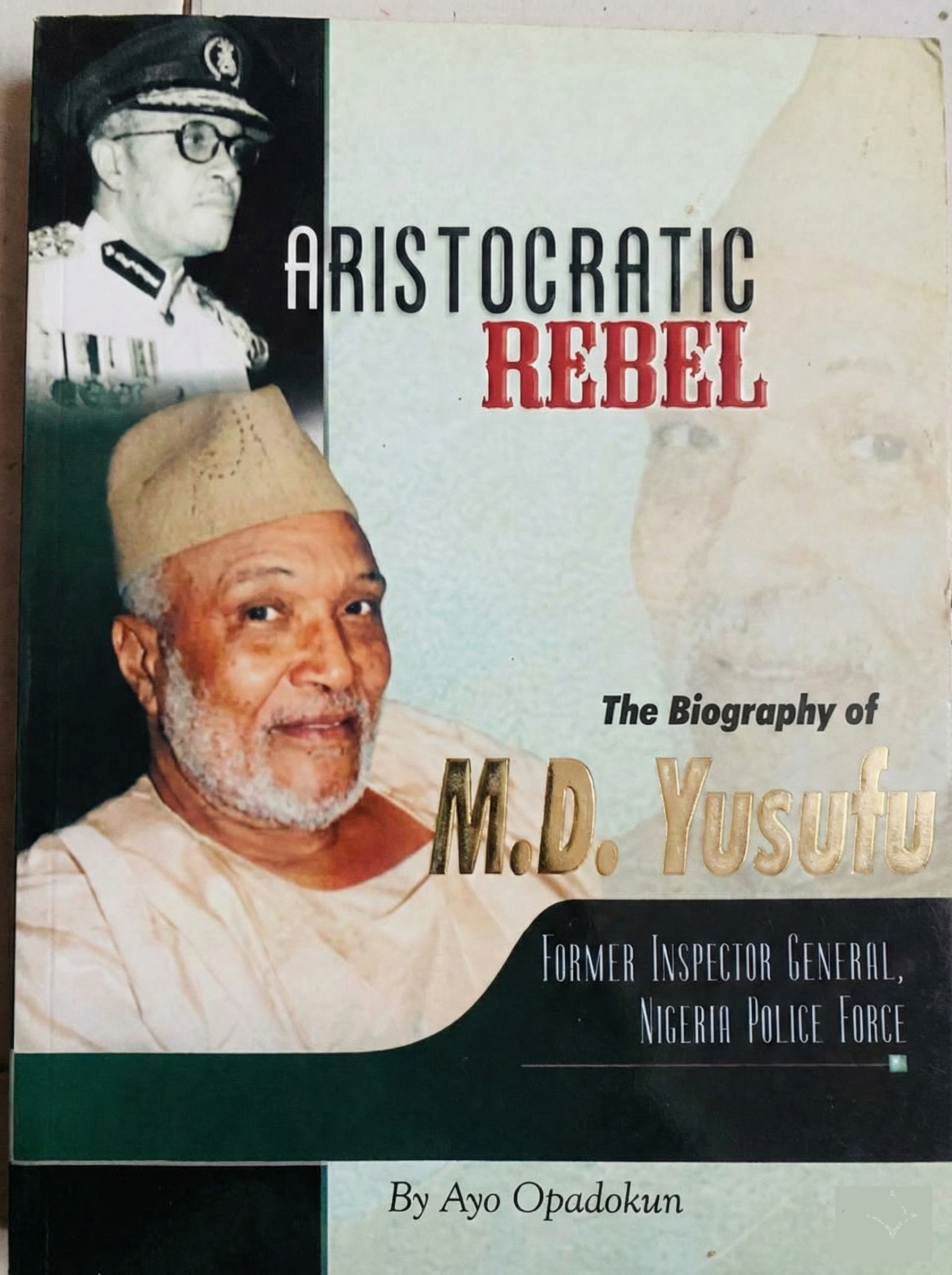

Training programs range from tailoring, shoe-making, computer literacy, welding, to auto-mechanics, among others. This wide array of vocational offerings ensures inclusivity and relevance to various socioeconomic needs. The center remained under close supervision of its founder until he died in April 2015. However, to ensure sustained governance and continuity beyond his lifetime, in 2014 he appointed Emir Muhammadu Sanusi II of Kano as KVTC Chairman.

== Mission and Objectives ==
The Katsina Vocational Training Centre (KVTC) aims to equip individuals particularly from the 34 local government areas of Katsina State with practical vocational skills and business starter kits. Its core objectives include fostering self-reliance, reducing over-dependence on government employment, and rehabilitating demoralized youth, especially those affected by drug abuse or political violence.

== Programs and Training ==
Katsina Vocational Training Centre offers training in a wide range of fields:

- Tailoring and Fashion Design
- Shoe Making and Leatherwork
- Electrical Wiring and Welding
- Motor and Auto Mechanics
- Carpentry
- GSM Phone Repair and Logging
- Computer and Internet Management
- Fish Farming, Catering, Bakery & Restaurant Services
- Driving Instruction

An element of the Centre’s training model is the daily library session, a legacy of the founder aimed at promoting literacy and independent research.

In October 2025, the centre launched a specialised training programme in collaboration with the Paracha Family of Abuja, aimed at equipping young people with knowledge of cryptocurrency and digital content creation. The two-day workshop, held on 25–26 October, attracted approximately 120 youths from across Katsina State. During the training, participants received instruction on the fundamentals of digital currencies, how the crypto market works, safe trading practices, and professional skills in content creation for digital platforms. After completing the programme, their names were forwarded for potential support via the Katsina State Enterprise Development Agency (KASEDA). The centre further indicated plans to extend this initiative by offering subsequent training batches in the use of artificial intelligence (AI) in social media content production.

== Milestones and Impact ==
Since its establishment in 2000, the Katsina Vocational Training Centre (KVTC) has empowered over 11,900 individuals from all 34 local government areas of Katsina State. This includes targeted rehabilitation and skills development for marginalized groups. Notably, the Centre has trained 2,770 inmates at the National Drug Law Enforcement Agency (NDLEA) facility in Katsina, as well as 870 inmates at the Katsina Correctional Centre, helping to reintegrate them into society through gainful skill acquisition. These achievements demonstrate KVTC’s commitment not only to youth empowerment but also to correctional and rehabilitation services.

In August 2021, when the Centre marked International Youth Day by empowering 315 young people with startup tools, including sewing and knitting machines, fashion design kits, and seed capital. This initiative aimed to foster self-employment and reduce dependency on government jobs. According to Hotpen News and Radio Nigeria Kaduna, this event reaffirmed KVTC’s hands-on, direct-action approach to grassroots skills development.

In 2025, KVTC secured 3,500 training slots through the Federal Government’s Technical and Vocational Education and Training (TVET) programme. Through this initiative, trainees received certified instruction, stipends, entrepreneurship support, and starter kits. The partnership marked a national recognition of the Centre’s credibility and its alignment with Nigeria’s vocational education framework.

Further reinforcing its impact, in July 2025, the Centre celebrated the graduation of 634 trainees across 15 vocational trades, including tailoring, carpentry, auto mechanics, welding, and GSM phone repair. Each graduate received trade-specific starter packs to launch their own businesses. The graduation ceremony, covered by Katsina Times, Leadership Newspaper, and Whistle NG, was attended by Governor Dikko Radda, who praised the program and pledged to expand its reach. Plans were also announced to introduce 10 new training departments to meet increasing demand.

In September 2025, the Katsina Vocational Training Center, in partnership with the Paracha Family of Abuja, conducted a three-day digital entrepreneurship workshop that trained youths from across the state on how to use mobile phones and WhatsApp Business for marketing, customer engagement, and small-scale online commerce. The programme, facilitated by a resource person from Jigawa State, encouraged participants to adopt self-reliance through mobile-based business skills, and concluded with a closing ceremony attended by the Chief Judge of Katsina State, Musa Danladi Abubakar, who presented certificates and urged responsible utilisation of the skills acquired.

=== Recognition of Muhammad Danjuma's Contribution to Youth Development ===
Muhammad Danjuma, publisher of Katsina Times and head of the Katsina Vocational Training Centre (KVTC), has been recognised for his contributions to youth vocational development in Katsina State.

According to a report published by Nigerian News Leader on 1 November 2026, Danjuma was among five individuals honoured by the Katsina State Government for their contributions to the establishment and development of the Katsina Youth Craft Village, a separate state vocational training institution.

The recognition took place during a graduation ceremony for 1,640 trainees on 24 October 2026. The awards were presented by Governor Dikko Umar Radda alongside former Governor Ibrahim Shehu Shema.

The report also highlighted Danjuma's earlier involvement in youth empowerment initiatives. According to the publication, the late Alhaji M.D. Yusuf sponsored him on a study tour to countries in Southern Africa to examine vocational training programmes and youth development strategies. Following the visit, Danjuma prepared reports documenting the lessons and recommendations that could help Nigerian governments develop effective youth empowerment policies.

The recognition highlighted the contributions of individuals who played roles in promoting vocational education, youth empowerment and economic self-reliance in Katsina State.

== Activities and Events ==
In August 2018, the Emir of Kano, Muhammadu Sanusi II, delivered several keynote remarks during events connected to the Katsina Vocational Training Center (KVTC), particularly during its International Youth Day Lecture and Graduation Ceremony.

Across multiple media reports — The Guardian (13 Aug. 2018), Daily Trust (25 Aug. 2018), Daily Sun (13 Aug. 2018), and The Punch (14 Aug. 2018) — Sanusi warned political leaders against exploiting religion for personal gain, noting that such practices had contributed to underdevelopment in northern Nigeria. He also linked rising insecurity, insurgency, and youth radicalization to the widespread exclusion of young people from the productive sector of the economy, particularly agriculture. Sanusi stressed the need for greater investment in education, agriculture, and youth empowerment, highlighting KVTC’s founder, the late M.D. Yusufu, as an example of individuals committed to these goals.

During one of the KVTC annual youth lectures, Sanusi urged political actors to sign peace accords to prevent the use of youths for election violence ahead of the 2019 polls, and emphasized that improved youth participation in the economy was essential for long-term national security. Reports from the National Youth Council of Nigeria (NYCN) at the same event accused certain politicians of attempting to hijack the Not-Too-Young-To-Run movement by imposing foreign-based children into politics, while also cautioning youths against being recruited for political violence.
