= Mohammed Adamu =

20th Nigerian inspector-general of police

20th Inspector-general of police of Nigeria
- In office 15 January 2019 – 6 April 2021
- Preceded by: Ibrahim Kpotun Idris
- Succeeded by: Usman Alkali Baba

Personal details
- Born: Mohammed Abubakar Adamu; 17 September 1961 (age 64) Lafia, Nasarawa State, Nigeria
- Education: Ahmadu Bello University, University of Portsmouth
- Occupation: Police officer

Mohammed Abubakar Adamu (born 17 September 1961) is a Nigerian retired police officer who is formerly the 20th Nigerian inspector-general of police. He was appointed by President Muhammadu Buhari on 15 January 2019 replacing Ibrahim Kpotun Idris (rtd.) of Niger State. Mohammed Adamu hails from Lafia, in Nasarawa State. He was replaced on 6 April 2021 with Usman Alkali Baba.

Before his appointment as Inspector General of Police, he was an Assistant Inspector-General of Police in Benin City, Edo State and was responsible for the overall management and operations of the NPF Zone 5, comprising Bayelsa, Delta and Edo State police commands.

== Early life and career ==
He was born on 17 September 1961 and enlisted into the Nigerian Police Force in 1986, after graduating from the Ahmadu Bello University, Zaria with a bachelor's degree (Hons.) in Geography. He also holds a master's degree in International Criminal Justice System from the University of Portsmouth, England.

Between 1983 and 1984, Adamu had his National Youth Service Corps (NYSC) in Wamba, Nasarawa State and taught Geography at Government Teachers College, Wamba, Plateau State, during the one-year service, then in 1984 — 1986, he was appointed Geography tutor and later promoted to Vice Principal at Government Day Secondary School, Gunduma, Keffi, Plateau State, but presently in Nasarawa State. He was married to Fatima Adamu.

== Career in Nigeria Police Force ==
Few years later, he joined the Nigeria Police Force as a Cadet Assistant Superintendent of Police in 1986, and trained at the Police College in Ikeja, Lagos State where he worked as the Divisional Crime & Administrative Officer at the Mgbidi Police Station in Mgbidi, Imo State. He served at many levels such as Officer in charge of General Investigation at the NPF Zone 6 Headquarters in Calabar.

Adamu also has extensive international experience, he worked at Interpol's NCB in Lagos from 1989-1997. He was the first Nigerian to be seconded to Interpol General Secretariat, Lyon in 1997 where he served as specialized officer in Economic and Financial Crime, Sub-directorate from 1997- 2002. He was appointed Assistant Director in charge of African Sub-Directorate from 2002-2005. He was again the first African in the history of INTERPOL to serve as Director when he was appointed director of NCB Services and I-24/7 Development from 2005-2007.

When he returned to Nigeria, he appointed Director in charge of Peacekeeping and Training at the Nigeria Police Headquarters, Abuja. Between 2013 and 2015 he was appointed Deputy Commissioner of Police and Commissioner of Police in Enugu State command.

== Inspector General of the Nigerian Police Force ==
President Muhammadu Buhari appointed him as the Acting Inspector General of Police on 15 January 2019, to replace Ibrahim Idris. On 28 January 2019, Adamu acting as the new inspector general of police submitted six names of the new deputy inspector generals of police to the police service commission for general approval. His full appointment as the 20th indigenous inspector general of police was confirmed by Muhammadu Buhari, GCFR, President of Nigeria on 23 May 2019.

== Awards ==
In October 2022, a Nigerian national honour of Commander of the Order of the Federal Republic (CFR) was conferred on him by President Muhammadu Buhari.

== See also ==
- List of Hausa people
- Inspector General of Police (Nigeria)
