= Gabriel Adejuwon =

Nigerian Monarch

Oba Gabriel Adejuwon
- Onisan of Isan-Ekiti
- Reign: 2017 – present
- Born: 15 November 1970 (age 55); Isan-Ekiti
- Occupation: Financial advisor

Oba Gabriel Ayodele Adejuwon is a Nigerian traditional ruler and financial expert. He currently serves as the 10th Onisan (king or traditional ruler) of Isan-Ekiti, a city located in the Oye Local Government Area of Ekiti, Nigeria. He served as the Chairman of the State Council of Traditional Rulers from July 28, 2021 until July 28, 2023.

== Early life and education ==
Gabriel was born on November 15, 1970, in Isan-Ekiti. He attended St. Paul's Anglican Primary School in Isan Ekiti from 1976 to 1982. He obtained his Ordinary and Higher National Diploma from Ondo State Polytechnic (now Rufus Giwa Polytechnic) between 1993 and 1997. He is also an alumnus of Adekunle Ajasin University, Akungba, Ondo State, class of 1999, and holds a Master of Business Administration (MBA) in Finance, which he earned in 2002.

He is a Fellow of the Chartered Institute of Taxation of Nigeria.

== Career ==
Adejuwon had a career spanning over twenty years with the Federal Inland Revenue Service, where he gained expertise in taxation, auditing, and financial management. He is an Associate of the Certified Board of Administrators (ACBA), and an Associate member of the Institute of Debts Recovery of Nigeria.

In 2017, he ascended to the throne of his home city, becoming the 10th Onisan.

In July 2021, Governor Kayode Fayemi appointed Adejuwon to the Chair of the State Council of Traditional Rulers, an assembly of traditional rulers of various cities and regions within the state tasked with being "custodians of culture, symbol of unity and critical partners in grassroots governance.

In October 2022, Abejuwon was awarded the Commander of the Order of the Federal Republic, an award given out by the President of Nigeria to individuals who have provided distinguished service to the nation.

== See also ==
- Nigerian traditional rulers
