= Louis Edet =

Inspector General of the Nigerian Police

Louis Orok Edet

1st Inspector General of Police
- In office 1964–1966
- Prime Minister: Abubakar Tafawa Balewa
- Preceded by: Position established
- Succeeded by: Kam Selem

Personal details
- Born: 1914 Calabar, Cross River State, Southern Nigeria Protectorate
- Died: 1979 (aged 64–65) Nigeria
- Occupation: Police Officer

Chief Louis Orok Edet QPM (1914–1979) was the Inspector General of the Nigeria Police Force from 1964–1966. He was the first indigenous Nigerian to occupy the position. He was briefly the chairman of the Nigerian Football Association in the early 1960s. He was born in Calabar to the family of Edet Essien and Geraldine Orok. After the end of the Nigerian Civil War, he devoted his time to helping war refugees and later became a commissioner for social services. He established a charity organization to continue his effort.

The Nigeria Police Force headquarters in Abuja is named after Louis Edet as "Louis Edet House".
