= Chukwudifu Oputa =

Nigerian judge

Ogbuagu Chukwudifu Oputa CFR

Justice of the Supreme Court of Nigeria
- In office 1984–1989

Judge of the High Court of the Eastern Nigeria
- In office 1966–1976

Personal details
- Born: 22 September 1924 Oguta, British Nigeria
- Died: 4 May 2014 (aged 89) Abuja, Nigeria
- Parents: Oputa Uzukwu (father); Nwametu Oputa (mother)
- Education: Sacred Heart School, Oguta
- Alma mater: Achimota College; University of London, London; Yaba College of Technology, Lagos

Ogbuagu Chukwudifu Oputa CFR (22 September 1924 – 4 May 2014) was a Nigerian jurist who was Judge of the Supreme Court of Nigeria from 1984 to 1989. He was appointed in 1999 by Olusegun Obasanjo to head the Oputa panel which investigated human right abuses by former military juntas and submitted their findings in 2003. A member of the Nigerian chieftaincy system, he held the title Ogbuagu and often used it as a pre-nominal honorific.

== Early life and education ==
Chukwudifu Oputa was born on 22 September 1924 in Oguta to Chief Oputa Uzukwu and Madam Nwametu Oputa. His father, an Igbo chieftain, was married to 10 wives. He fathered multiple children, of which Chukwudifu was the last. He started his education at the Sacred Heart School, Oguta from 1930 to 1936 and then proceeded to the Christ the king College, Onitsha for his post primary education from 1937 to 1940 where he obtained his West Africa Senior School Certificate.

Oputa furthered to the Yaba Higher College but had to leave for Achimota College, Ghana during the World War II where he obtained a degree in Economics in 1945. He then moved to London where he graduated with a Bachelor of Arts in History from the University of London and then a degree in Law by 1953. He was called to bar at the Bar-Gary Inn on 26 November 1953.

After the war, Oputa was a principal of Kalabari National College, Buguma until 1948, and between 1949 and 1951 was Administrative Officer, Nigerian Secretariat.

== Law career ==
Oputa came back to Nigeria where he set up a private law firm and practiced for years, handling multiple high-profile cases including the Oguta Chieftaincy Title dispute in 1959 and the Amayenabo dispute in 1960. He was appointed a justice of the then High Court of Eastern Nigeria in 1966 and promoted to Chief Judge of Imo State in 1976.

Between 1971 and 1976, Oputa served as a judge in the defunct East Central State and from 1976 to 1984 was High Court Judge of Imo State.

Oputa was promoted to Justice of the Supreme Court of Nigeria in 1984 where he served for 5 years before he retired in 1989. His stint at the Supreme court was commended by his fellow justices with former Chief Justice, Mohammed Bello, described him as "the Socrates of the Supreme Court". He was recalled by Olusegun Obasanjo to head The Human Rights Violation Investigation Commission of Nigeria famously referred to as the Oputa panel to investigate human rights during the period of military rule from 1984 to 1999.

== Personal life ==
Oputa was a devoted Catholic and honored as a Knight Commander of St. Gregory the Great, Knight Commander of St. Sylvester, and Knight of St. Mulumba. He published over 40 papers in lectures, conferences and seminars. The Oputa Foundation was created in his honor to promote accountable, transparent and respect for the rule of law. He died on 4 May 2014 due to a minor illness.

== Awards and honours ==
In appreciation of his service to Nigeria, he was conferred with the National Honour of Commander of the Order of the Federal Republic (CFR) by President Goodluck Jonathan.

Justice Oputa was made a member of the prestigious Igbuu society of Oguta, a fact which entitled him to use the word Ogbuagu as a pre-nominal honorific.
