= Ayo Omotayo =

Nigerian academic

Director General of the National Institute for Policy and Strategic Studies
- Incumbent
- Assumed office February 2022

Personal details
- Born: Ayo Omotayo
- Education: University of Ibadan
- Profession: environmental sustainability and academic leadership
- Website: https://nipsskuru.gov.ng/director-general/

Ayo Omotayo is a Professor of Environmental Sustainability and the Director General of the National Institute for Policy and Strategic Studies.

He is an academic, serial entrepreneur, writer and published author. He contributes to the societal affairs of Nigeria through his writings on the environment, politics, ethics, policies towards sustainable national development.

== Career ==
Ayo began his career as an academic at Lagos State University as an assistant lecturer from 1985–1992. He was promoted to the position of senior lecturer at the same university from 1992–2012. He served as the Dean of the Faculty of Social Sciences between 2012 and 2017 and Director of the Centre for Planning from 2017 to 2022. He resumed the office of Director General of the National Institute in 2022. He served as the President of the University of Ibadan Jaycees in the 1986–87 academic Session.

During his tenure at Lagos State University, Professor Ayo founded the MBA programme and developed an online payment and registration technology for Lagos State University (HEDUMSYS). He also started his company, Netlynk Incorporated, a computer consulting firm in Atlanta-Georgia, developed Cashfast, a technology for international money transfer over the internet, and led the re-engineering of the IT system of Standard Trust Bank in Nigeria.

Aside from academic endeavour, and environmental advocacy, Ayo is a serial entrepreneur and founder some companies which include Netlynk Incorporated, a computer consulting firm in Atlanta-Georgia after obtaining training and certification in Java programming, Novel Networking Engineering, and Microsoft Systems Engineering.

He was nominated by Muhammadu Buhari and his appointment as the Director General of the National Institute was confirmed by the Senate of Nigeria.

== Education ==
Ayo got his Ph.D. in geography from the University of Ibadan in 1990.

== Personal life ==
Ayo is married and he has one daughter.
