= Ibrahim Kpotun Idris =

Nigerian Inspector General of Police

19th Inspector General of Police
- In office 21 March 2016 – 6 January 2019
- Preceded by: Solomon Arase
- Succeeded by: Mohammed Adamu

Personal details
- Born: 15 January 1959 (age 67) Kutigi, Lavun, Niger State, Nigeria
- Education: Ahmadu Bello University, University of Maiduguri
- Occupation: Police Officer

Ibrahim Idris Kpotun (born 15 January 1959) is a Nigerian police officer and former Inspector General of Police. He was appointed to this position by President Muhammadu Buhari on 21 March 2016, serving till his retirement in January 2019. He replaced Solomon Arase, who retired from the police force on 21 June 2016.

Prior to his appointment, he was an Assistant Inspector General of Police (Operations), FHQ Abuja. He also led the Police Mobile Force as well as the Kano State and Nasarawa State police commands in Nigeria while serving in the rank of Commissioner of Police.

== Biography ==
Idris hails from Kutigi, Lavun in Niger State. He was born on 15 January 1959, and enlisted into the Nigerian Police Force in 1984, after graduating from the Ahmadu Bello University Zaria with a bachelor's degree in Agriculture. He also holds a degree in Law from the University of Maiduguri.

== Records achieved ==
Idris is the first and only IGP in history of Nigeria to declare his assets publicly and received commendation from the Code of Conduct Bureau for complying with declaration of assets regulations and also the only IGP to have deployed female officer in commanding units at state level.
