= Musiliu Smith =

Nigerian police officer (born 1946)

10th Inspector General of Police
- In office May 29, 1999 – March 2002
- Preceded by: Ibrahim Coomassie
- Succeeded by: Mustafa Adebayo Balogun

Personal details
- Born: April 17, 1946 (age 80) Olowogbowo, Lagos State
- Education: University of Lagos
- Occupation: Police Officer

Alhaji Musiliu Adeola Kunbi Smith, is a former Inspector General of Police of Nigeria appointed in May 1999, who retired in March 2002 following a police strike.

== Early life and career ==
Smith was born on April 17, 1946. He completed secondary education at Ansarud-deen College, Isolo, Lagos and attended the University of Lagos, where he obtained a B.Sc. in sociology in 1970.

In 1972, Smith joined the police force in Enugu as an assistant police superintendent. He later served as an instructor in the Police College Ikeja, and a divisional police officer in Mubi, Adamawa State. From 1980 to 1982, he was in charge of the X-Squad at CID Alagbon Close, Ikoyi. He then moved to Ilorin, where he served in various capacities, finally becoming Kwara State Police Command administrative officer. He was posted to Rivers State in 1987, taking charge of the Police College. In 1988, he was promoted to commissioner of police and moved to Lagos, where he took over control of the Criminal Intelligence Divisional Force. He returned to Kwara State and later Plateau State as commissioner of police. In 1996, Musiliu Smith was promoted to assistant inspector general of police, placed in charge of Zonal Headquarters, Kano. He completed a master's degree programme in strategic studies at the University of Ibadan in 1997. He was appointed a member of the Provisional Ruling Council in 1998.

== IGP ==
Smith was appointed the inspector general of police on May 29, 1999. He succeeded Ibrahim Coomassie, who had held the post since 1993.

Smith followed instructions from President Olusegun Obasanjo in refusing to follow up on charges of certificate forgery laid against Lagos State Governor, Bola Tinubu, saying the court could not compel the police to do the investigation.

On 1 February 2002, the Nigerian Union of Policemen called a partially successful strike. Smith was asked to retire by Olusegun Obasanjo in March 2002. He was replaced by Mustafa Adebayo Balogun.

== Post-career ==
As of 2006, Musiliu Smith was chairman of the Skye Bank board of directors. In 2007, Lagos State Governor Babatunde Fashola appointed Smith head of the Lagos State Security council, a body charged with taking a holistic look at the anatomy of crime in the state.
