= Muhammadu Dikko Yusufu =

Nigerian policeman and politician (1931–2015)

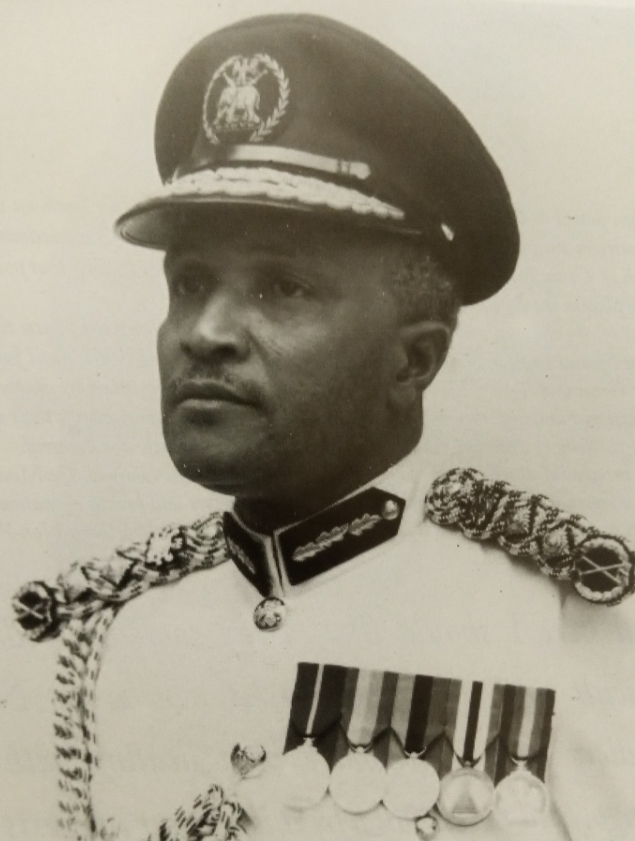

3rd Inspector General of Police
- In office 1975–1979
- Preceded by: Kam Salem
- Succeeded by: Adamu Suleiman

Personal details
- Born: November 10, 1931 Katsina, Northern Nigeria
- Died: April 1, 2015 (aged 83) Abuja, Nigeria
- Occupation: Police Officer, Politician

Alhaji Muhammadu Dikko Yusufu GCON, also known as MD Yusufu or MD Yusuf (November 10, 1931 – April 1, 2015) was a Nigerian policeman, Inspector General of the Nigerian Police Force, public servant and politician.

== Early life and education ==
Yusufu attended Higher Education at the Institute of Administration, Zaria in 1954 and University of Oxford where he was trained as administrative officer. Yusufu was the great grandson of Sarkin Katsina Muhammadu Dikko (r. 1906–1944).

Yusufu started work at the Katsina Native Authority serving as Assistant District Officer in Ilorin Province from 1949 to 1954. Yusufu rose to the position of Inspector General of the Nigerian Police, a post he held from 1975 to 1979 during the military rule of Generals Murtala Mohammed and Olusegun Obasanjo. He was appointed chairman of Nigeria Liquefied Natural Gas (NLNG) in 1994. In 1998, he registered Movement for Democracy and Justice as a political party and in 1999 and 2003, he ran as a presidential candidate on its platform. In the December 1998 local government elections, the party came 4th and won 83 councilor seats in 21 States of the Federation and Chairmanship of Warri in Delta State, Hadejia in Jigawa State and Bama in Borno.

Yusufu was chairman of Nigeria LNG in 1994, when a consortium led by Halliburton's KBR subsidiary was bidding for a contract to construct a LNG export facility in competition with the US corporation Bechtel. In a letter to Yusufu in September 1994, the oil minister Don Etiebet said that the NLNG board had "seriously tinkered with the integrity of the pending contract award". He considered that there had been breaches of commercial confidentiality, that may have benefited the consortium led by KBR.

During a probe into alleged bribes by KBR, a London-based consultant, Jeffrey Tesler said he had advanced money to Muhammadu Dikko Yusufu in the form of a repayable loan. The $70,000 loan was made during a visit by Yusufu to London in 1998 or 1999. Attempts were made to implicate US Vice-President Dick Cheney in the corruption scandal, which involved over $180m of bribes on behalf of a consortium led by Halliburton.

== Political activities ==
He joined National Council of Nigeria and the Cameroons (NCNC) in 1950, and Northern Elements Progressive Union (NEPU) in 1951 but gave up politics when he joined the Northern Regional Service. In the second republic after retirement from police he became a member of the People's Redemption Party. Yusufu indicated interest to contest the Presidential elections under the Grassroots Democratic Movement in Nigeria during the period of transition to democracy launched by General Sani Abacha in 1997–1998. The Party had a left-wing orientation. In 2000, he became chairman of the Arewa Consultative Forum, a Northern cultural and political association.

After the April 2003 elections, both Muhammadu Buhari of the ANPP and Yusufu, who had run as presidential candidate of the Movement for Democracy and Justice (MDJ), challenged the election victory of President Obasanjo. However, in June 2003, Yusufu, said that defeated contestants who were not ready to go to court should accept their defeat in good faith.

In November 2003, Yusufu said the granting of asylum by President Olusegun Obasanjo to the deposed Liberian president, Charles Taylor could not be defended on the grounds of either justice or commonsense and was therefore impeachable.

Yusufu died on April 1, 2015, in Abuja.

== Katsina Vocational Training Centre ==
In 2000, MD Yusufu established the Katsina Vocational Training Centre in Kerau Quarters, Katsina (No. 9 MD Yusuf Street). Personally funding the initiative, he served as its sole financier until his death in 2015. The centre aimed to combat youth unemployment and rehabilitate vulnerable groups—including youths, women, physically challenged individuals, and inmates—by offering vocational training in more than 20 trades such as tailoring, welding, auto mechanics, carpentry, computer skills, and catering. Recognizing the importance of literacy, Yusufu introduced daily library sessions. By 2018, the centre had trained over 11,900 beneficiaries and reached out to prison populations through programs at NDLEA and the Correctional Centre. To ensure long-term governance, Yusufu appointed Emir Muhammadu Sanusi II of Kano as KVTC chairman in 2014.
