= Ajibola Akindele =

Nigerian electrical engineer

Ajibola Akindele MFR is a Nigerian electrical engineer concurrently serving as president and managing director of Schneider Electric in West Africa and as managing director for Schneider Electric Process Automation for Sub-Saharan Africa. He holds the Nigerian National Honour of the Order of the Member of the Federal Republic (MFR) conferred on him in October 2022.

== Education and career ==
Ajibola Akindele, a native of Ondo State studied electrical engineering at the University of Lagos where he graduated with a Second-class Upper Honours in 1999 and earned an MBA from Vanderbilt University in 2007. He is a Chartered Financial Analyst (CFA).

Akindele's electrical engineering expertise focuses on power transmission, distribution and solar energy and has worked across multiple industries including power, oil and gas, manufacturing and financial sector. He began his career with Accenture in Lagos and worked there for five years before leaving for his MBA in 2005. In 2007, he joined Citigroup, New York before being transferred to London in 2009 and rose through the ranks to the position of Vice President.

Akindele left Citigroup in 2013 and returned to Nigeria to join General Electric where he held multiple executive positions including as Regional Director for Energy Connections business. In 2017, he left General Electric to join Siemen as Divisional Lead for Digital Industries where he served for two years before leaving to join Schneider Electric in December 2019. He is currently serving as President and Managing Director of Schneider Electric in West Africa and as Managing Director for Schneider Electric Process Automation for Sub-Saharan Africa. He is a member of the board of Franco-Nigeria Chamber of Commerce and Industry and was a member of Nigeria's Presidential Transition Committee on Power to develop a roadmap for power generation.

== Awards and honours ==
On 11 October 2022, Akindele was conferred with the national honour of Member of the Federal Republic (MFR) by President Muhammadu Buhari.
