= Sunday Adewusi =

Nigerian policeman and Inspector General of Police

Sunday Adedayo Adewusi

5th Inspector General of Police
- In office 1981–1983
- Preceded by: Adamu Suleiman
- Succeeded by: Etim Inyang

Personal details
- Born: 6 December 1936 Ogbomoso, Nigeria
- Died: 26 January 2016 (aged 79) Abuja, Nigeria
- Party: Non partisian

Sunday Adedayo Adewusi (6 December 1936 – 26 January 2016) was a Nigerian policeman and former Inspector General of Police. He was appointed in 1981 to succeed Adamu Suleiman and was succeeded by Etim Inyang in 1983. He died at the age of 79 in 2016. He was born in Nassarawa state of Nigeria.

== Early life ==
He started his education at Mada Station between 1944 and 1948, after which he proceeded to Baptist Day School, Jos where he stayed and completed his standard six between 1949 and 1950. He had his secondary education at Keffi from 1951 to 1956.

== Police Force ==
He joined the Nigeria Police Force and had his police training at the Police College from 1957 to 1958 as a cadet sub-inspector. At the police college, he won the cane of honour. In 1965, he went to Police staff college in Scotland. He also studied operation of force at East Riding Constabulary of Yorkshire. At age 32 he was appointed Commissioner of Police, and at age 45 he was appointed Inspector General of Police.
