= Usman Alkali Baba =

Nigerian inspector-general of police

Inspector General of Police
- In office 6 April 2021 – 19 June 2023
- Preceded by: Mohammed Adamu
- Succeeded by: Kayode Egbetokun

Personal details
- Born: 1 March 1963 (age 63)
- Occupation: Police officer

Usman Alkali Baba CFR (born 1 March 1963) was the 21st Nigerian Inspector General of Police. He was appointed by the President of Nigeria Muhammadu Buhari to replace Mohammed Adamu who retired from Nigeria Police Force in February 2021. The Police Council on Friday, June 4, 2021, confirmed the appointment of Alkali Usman Baba as the substantive Inspector General of Police.

== Early life and education ==
Alkali is from Geidam, Yobe State, Nigeria. In 1980, he received a Teacher's Grade II Certificate from Teachers College, Potiskum, Yobe State. He studied political science at Bayero University Kano, graduating in 1985, before preceding to University of Maiduguri where he received master's in public administration in 1997. Baba was a member of course 22/2014 2014 at National Defence College.

== Career ==
Alkali enlisted in the Nigeria Police Force on 15 March 1988 and later became an assistant superintendent of police, and he gained the promotion of commissioner of police on 27 January 2013. In 2014, he was posted to Delta State as the commissioner of police. He served as DIG Force CID, force secretary at the force headquarters, Abuja, Nigeria. He served in FCT as the deputy commissioner, investigation and in the staff college as a directing staff. He has also served in Kaduna as the deputy commissioner, administration and assistant commissioner, CID. He served in Ilorin as an area commander. At Ebonyi State, he was the second-in-command. He has served in Kaduna, Yola, Jos and Gombe State as divisional police officer, DPO. Baba was a former assistant inspector-general of police Zone 5, in-charge of Edo State, Delta State and Bayelsa State. Baba is a fellow of the International War College and a member of the International Association of Police.

== Inspector-general of police ==
On 6 April 2021, the President of Nigeria Muhammadu Buhari appointed Baba to replace Mohammed Adamu who retired from Nigeria Police Force in February 2021. Until his appointment as the IG of police, he was a deputy inspector-general of police, force criminal investigation department, force headquarters.

== Awards ==
In October 2022, a Nigerian national honour of Commander of the Order of the Federal Republic (CFR) was conferred on him by President Muhammadu Buhari.
