= Sunday Ehindero =

Inspector General of the Nigerian police

12th Inspector General of Police
- In office 2005–2007
- Preceded by: Mustafa Adebayo Balogun
- Succeeded by: Mike Mbama Okiro

Personal details
- Occupation: Police officer

Sunday Gabriel Ehindero was the Inspector General of the Nigeria Police Force from 2005 to 2007.

== Background ==
Sunday Ehindero originated from Oyin-Akoko (Ondo State). He attended Gboluji Grammar school in Ondo State, obtained a Bachelor of Science degree from the University of Ibadan and a law degree from the Nigerian Law School. He started his career as teacher in Abeokuta, Ogun State, and transitioned into the police force in the early 1970s. He was born in Jos, Plateau State and is one of 14 living children. He is fluent in Yoruba, Hausa and English. He is the author of many books and currently works as a lawyer in his law firm.

In April 2004, as Deputy Inspector-General of Police (Administration), Sunday Ehindero was involved in an investigation of a case where human bodies and skulls were found at the Okija Shrine in Anambra State.

== Inspector General of Police ==
In January 2005, Inspector General Tafa Balogun was forced to resign after it was revealed that he was under investigation by the Economic and Financial Crimes Commission (EFCC). He was replaced by Sunday Ehindero. In February 2006, Sunday Ehindero said the Force would send a bill to the National Assembly to amend police Act to remove gender bias. He also expressed pleasure that the Supreme Court judgment had declared that police lawyers could prosecute criminal cases in any court in Nigeria. In May 2006, after a pipeline explosion at Inagbe beach on the outskirts of Lagos, Ehindero called for Communities and officials to play a greater role in securing the pipelines.

In August 2006, Sunday Ehindero spoke at a meeting attended by officials of the National Orientation Agency (NOA), the Economic and Financial Crimes Commission (EFCC) and the Independent Corrupt Practices Commission (ICPC). He said the police were concerned with control of corruption in the society and within the police itself. He said his administration has started addressing the second issue through improved pay to policemen. On the first issue, he said he was taking steps to educate the National Union of Road Transport Workers to resist N20 illegal extortion. He also voiced support of community partnership in policing. In September 2006, IGP Sunday Ehindero was subject to over three hours of searching questions by the Senate. He noted that police roadblocks were not by his orders. He said the duplication of anti-corruption commissions like the EFCC and the ICPC were not needed as the police could handle the jobs.

In December 2006, Sunday Ehindero said the police had bought 30 armoured vehicles to combat crime in Lagos, Bayelsa, Delta and Rivers states. In March 2007, Ehindero said he was confident that the police could cope with any problems that might arise in the forthcoming national gubernatorial and presidential elections. Earlier he had noted that 80,000 weapons and 32 million rounds of ammunition had been procured for the police. Also in 2007, he announced that more than 10,000 officers would be sacked in an attempt to root out dirty cops. He said that the previous IGP Mustafa Balogun, later convicted on corruption charges, had employed thousands of officers with criminal records.

On 9 April 2007, three weeks before newly elected President Umaru Yar'Adua was sworn in, Ehindero recommended promotion of the chairman of the Economic and Financial Crimes Commission Nuhu Ribadu from commissioner of police to assistant inspector general. In August 2008, questions on the subsequent demotion of Ribadu were challenged on the basis that the original promotion was "illegal, unconstitutional, null and void, and of no legal effect."

== Post-retirement ==
After his retirement in 2007, Sunday Ehindero faced a probe over a N21 million Naira fraud, N2.5 billion of police cooperative money, N300 million police funds and the source of money for allegedly building about eight magnificent houses. His passport was seized. When interrogated by the acting Inspector General of Police, Mr Mike Okiro, the Commissioner of Police in charge of Budget Mr John Obaniyi said that money found being smuggled out of police headquarters was being taken to Ehindero.

In April 2008, the ICPC interrogated Ehindero on how money meant to buy arms and ammunition for the police allegedly ended up in his private accounts. He stated that the money was provided by Goodluck Jonathan, then state governor of Bayelsa State and later vice-president, at his request. It was placed in police accounts and he did not see any of it.

== Arrest ==
On September 21, 2012, Ehindero was arrested and held at Kuje Prison after being charged with six counts of corruption involving the embezzlement of N16 million meant to pay Nigerian police officers and N557 Million meant to pay for the Nigerian Police Force's arms and equipment. Despite being granted the right to have bail, Ehindero would remain in prison after his right for bail was docked after he failed to meet conditions for it. Co-defendant John Obaniyi, who was the former commissioner of police in charge of budget, would also be granted the right for bail, only to remain in prison after it was docked as well. On November 12, 2019, Ehindero and his co-defendants Kelvin Omoraw, and Samuel Odariko were cleared of the total N16.4 million corruption charges after the presiding judge, Justice Silvanus Oriji, determined that prosecution failed to prove the money they embezzled was diverted for their personal use. However, all three defendants were still facing charges for their arms and equipment embezzlements, which totaled N567 million.

This external link does not provide further information about Sunday Ehindero
