= Ogbonna Okechukwu Onovo =

Nigerian police officer (born 1953)

14th Inspector General of Police
- In office July 2009 – 8 September 2010
- President: Umaru Yar'Adua; Goodluck Jonathan
- Preceded by: Mike Mbama Okiro
- Succeeded by: Hafiz Ringim

Chairman of the National Drug Law Enforcement Agency
- In office 1998–2000
- Preceded by: Musa Bamaiyi
- Succeeded by: Iliya Lokadang

Personal details
- Born: 7 February 1953 (age 73) Enugu State
- Education: University of Nigeria, Nsukka
- Occupation: Police Officer

Ogbonna Okechukwu Onovo (born 7 February 1953) is a former Inspector General of the Nigerian Police (IGP), serving from July 2009 to September 2010. He was appointed IGP upon the retirement of Mike Mbama Okiro.

== Background ==
Ogbonna Okechukwu Onovo was born on 7 February 1953 in Nkanu Local Government Area of Enugu State. He attended the University of Nigeria, Nsukka from 1972 - 1976, where he obtained a B.Sc. Political Science.

He joined the police force in August 1977 as an Assistant Superintendent of Police and rose steadily through the ranks, becoming Commissioner of Police in April 1997 and Assistant Inspector-General of Police in May 2001. His first postings were in Rivers State, with later positions in Imo State, Lagos, Edo State, Adamawa State and Ogun State. Between 1998 and 2000 he was chairman/chief executive officer of the National Drug Law Enforcement Agency (NDLEA). He was promoted to Deputy Inspector General on 14 March 2002, and served three Inspectors General (Tafa Balogun, Sunday Ehindero and Mike Okiro) in that role. He was briefly the acting Inspector General of the Nigeria Police Force in 2007, before Mike Okiro was appointed to the IG post.

== Inspector General of Police ==
At the ceremony where he formally assumed the acting IGP post in July 2009, Ogbonna Okechukwu Onovo promised continuity with the direction set by his predecessor. He said "we will ensure we have a stable and secure society with crime brought down to the barest minimum by initiating new crime fighting strategies and employing our greatest assets, manpower through well motivated measures." On 5 August 2009 the Nigeria Police Council confirmed Onovo as the substantive Inspector General of Police.

In August 2009, Ogbonna Okechukwu Onovo said that aide de camps (ADC's) attached to governors or political office holders would be allowed to spend no more than three years on that assignment, after which they must return to the force. He also announced a campaign to deploy mobile police officers to address the high rate of kidnapping in Anambra State and the entire South East.

In late July 2009, members of the extremist Boko Haram sect went on the rampage in five Northern States of Nigeria, attacking several police stations. During the violence, Mohammed Yusuf, the leader of the Boko Haram, was captured and died in police custody, reportedly when he was trying to escape. On 5 August, Ogbonna Okechukwu Onovo summoned the five Commissioners of Police in the North East to explain police involvement in the death. In September 2009, Ogbonna Okechukwu Onovo declared the 20 police who had died trying to maintain order "National Heroes" and presented cheques to their families in compensation.
