= Mohammed Dikko Abubakar =

Nigerian police chief

Mohammed Dahiru Abubakar
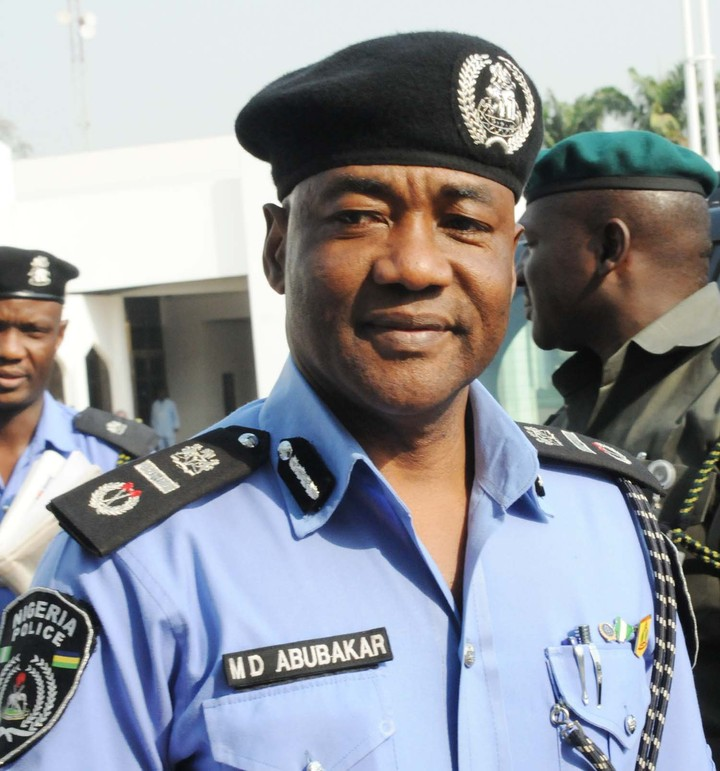

16th Inspector General of Police
- In office 2012–2014
- Preceded by: Hafiz Ringim
- Succeeded by: Suleiman Abba

Personal details
- Born: 5 May 1960 (age 66) Gusau, Zamfara State, Nigeria
- Spouse: Zarah Bunu Abubakar
- Children: 3
- Education: Gusau township Primary School
- Alma mater: University of Lagos, NIPSS
- Occupation: Police officer
- Awards: Commander of the Order of the Federal Republic of Nigeria (CFR), NPM, mni
- Nickname: MD

Mohammed Dikko Abubakar, CFR, NPM, mni (Rtd) is a Nigerian Policeman and former Inspector General of Police. He was appointed in 2012 to succeed Hafiz Ringim and was succeeded by Suleiman Abba in 2014. He is currently the Pro Chancellor and Chairman of council Al-Hikma University, Ilorin and also the President of Alumni Association of the National Institute (AANI).

== Early life and career ==
Abubakar was born in Gusau, a city of then Sokoto State, which is also the capital of today Zamfara State. The firstborn of a family of many, his father is an Islamic scholar and farmer. Abubakar enlisted in the Nigerian Police Force on July 30, 1979. From 1993 to 1995, he served as the Assistant Commissioner of Police. Following this role, he were promoted to Deputy Commissioner of Police, a position held from 1995 until 2000.

In 2000, he took on the role of Commissioner of Police in Abia State, serving an eight-year term that concluded in 2008. Immediately following this tenure, he transitioned to the position of Assistant Inspector General of Police, where he served from 2008 until 2012.
