= Mohammed Goni =

Nigerian politician (1942–2020)

Governor of Borno State
- In office October 1979 – October 1983
- Preceded by: Tunde Idiagbon
- Succeeded by: Asheik Jarma

Personal details
- Born: 1942 Kareto, Mobbar LGA, Borno State, Nigeria
- Died: 29 April 2020 (aged 78) Maiduguri, Borno

Alhaji Mohammed Goni was a civil servant who was Governor of Borno State, Nigeria (1979–1983) in the Nigerian Second Republic.

== Background ==
Mohammed Goni was born in 1942 in Kareto, Mobbar Local Government Area, Borno State, Nigeria. He attended Maiduguri Middle School (1953–55), Borno Provincial Secondary School (1956–61), Provincial Secondary School, Kano (1962–63) and the Institute of Administration, Ahmadu Bello University, Zaria (1964–87), where he gained a BA (Administration), specialising in international affairs.

In 1977, he transferred to the Nigerian National Supply Company.

== Governor of Borno State ==
In April 1979, Mohammed Goni resigned from the National Supply Company and entered politics. He was elected as the first civilian governor of the former Borno State, on the platform of the Great Nigeria Peoples Party (GNPP), and was in office from October 1979 to September 1983. He was also part of the Progressives Coalition led by Chief Obafemi Awolowo. Goni founded the Borno Radio Television (BRTV) to counter the propaganda which was being pumped out of the Federal Government owned and sponsored Nigerian Television Authority (NTA). In retrospect, his period of office was considered one of achievement when compared with his successors.

Before the 1983 elections, Goni transferred to the Unity Party of Nigeria (UPN), running unsuccessfully for reelection against the Nigerian People's Party (NPP) candidate Sheikh Jarma. In the case of Federal Electoral Commission v Alhadji Mohammed Goni (1983), the Supreme Court of Nigeria condemned cross-carpeting by political officeholders.

== Later career ==
Mohammed Goni was a member of the committee that drafted the 1995 Constitution. In the April 2003 general elections he ran on the United Nigeria People's Party (UNPP) platform as vice-presidential candidate with Jim Nwobodo as the presidential candidate. They were not elected.

In January 2011 he was elected by PDP delegates in Borno state to be their gubernatorial flag-bearer in the April 2011 elections.

== Death ==
Mohammed Goni died on 29 April 2020 in Maiduguri, Borno State, after a brief illness. He was 78 years old at the time of his death.
