= Hafiz Ringim =

Former Nigerian Inspector General of Police

Hafiz Abubakar Ringim

15th Inspector General of Police
- In office 2010–2012
- Preceded by: Ogbonna Okechukwu Onovo
- Succeeded by: Mohammed Dikko Abubakar

Personal details
- Born: 1 April Jigawa State, Nigeria
- Party: Non partisian

Hafiz Ringim was a Nigerian Policeman and former Inspector General of Police. He was appointed in 2010 to succeed Ogbonna Okechukwu Onovo and was succeeded by Mohammed Dikko Abubakar in 2012.
