= Kayode Egbetokun =

22nd Inspector General of Police of Nigeria (born 1964)

22nd Inspector General of Police
- In office 19 June 2023 – 24 February 2026
- Preceded by: Usman Alkali Baba
- Succeeded by: Tunji Disu

Personal details
- Born: 4 September 1964 (age 62) Erinja, Yewa South, Ogun State, Nigeria
- Education: University of Lagos; Delta State University; Lagos State University; Al-Hikmah University
- Occupation: Police officer

Kayode Egbetokun (born September 1964) is a Nigerian police officer who served as the 22nd Inspector General of Police. He was appointed by President Bola Ahmed Tinubu to replace Usman Alkali Baba. He resigned as Inspector General Police on 24 February 2026.

== Early life and education ==
Egbetokun was born on 4 September 1964 in Erinja in the Yewa South local government area of Ogun state. He graduated from the University of Lagos, Akoka, with a bachelor's degree in Mathematics in June 1987, later receiving a master's degree in Engineering Analysis in 1996. He briefly lectured in Mathematics at the Yaba College of Technology.

He went on to receive a postgraduate diploma in Petroleum Economics from Delta State University in 2000 and an MBA from Lagos State University in 2004. He also received a PhD in Peace and Security Studies from Al-Hikmah University in Ilorin, Kwara State.

== Career ==
Egbetokun enlisted in the Nigeria Police Force on 3 March 1990 as a Cadet Assistant Superintendent of Police. As a deputy superintendent of Police in 1999, he was appointed the chief security officer to the then-elected governor of Lagos State, Bola Tinubu, who is now the President of Nigeria.

He has served as the Commander, Rapid Response Squad (RRS), Lagos, Squadron Commander, MOPOL, Anti-Fraud Unit, FCT Command, Abuja, Chief Superintendent of Police, Administration, Lagos State Command headquarters, Ikeja, Area Commander, Osogbo, Osun State Command and Area Commander, Gusau, Zamfara State Command.

On 19 June 2023, President Tinubu appointed Egbetokun to replace Usman Alkali Baba. Until his appointment as the inspector general, he was a deputy inspector-general of police and supervising DIG for the South-West geo-political zone, to head the Force Criminal Investigations Department (FCID), Force Headquarters, Abuja since 6 April 2023.

On 24 February 2026, Egbetokun resigned as Inspector General ff Police. He stated that the reason for his resignation is to spend more time with his family.
