= Kam Selem =

Nigerian polilce officer

Kam Salem

2nd Inspector General of Police
- In office 1966–1975
- Preceded by: Louis Edet
- Succeeded by: Muhammadu Dikko Yusufu

Personal details
- Occupation: Police Officer

Kam Salem is a Nigerian former police officer and the second Inspector General of Nigerian Police, a post he held from 1966 to 1975 during the military rule of General Yakubu Gowon.

At the time of the January 1966 coup led by Major Chukwuma Kaduna Nzeogwu, Dikko Yusufu was acting Inspector General since the I.G. Louis Edet was on leave at the time, and he had to deal with the crisis when the Prime Minister Abubakar Tafawa Balewa and others were found murdered.

By the 1970s, press criticism of corruption in the Gowon regime was mounting. Selem spoke against a press "campaign against the federal government, putting pressure on it to institute an inquiry into the conduct of certain public functionaries." He said, "The government will not allow itself to be stampeded into taking actions in any matter of public interest."
