= Order of the Federal Republic =

Nigerian order of merit

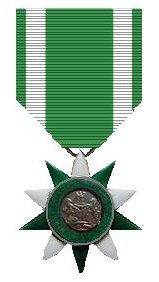
- Order of the Federal Republic
- Type: State decoration
- Country: Nigeria

Precedence
- Next (higher): None
- Next (lower): Order of the Niger
- Military Division Civil Division; Ribbon bars of the Order of the Federal Republic

The Member of the Order of the Federal Republic (MFR) is one of two orders of merit, established by the Federal Republic of Nigeria in 1963. It is senior to the Order of the Niger.

The highest honours are the Grand Commander in the Order of the Federal Republic and Grand Commander in the Order of the Niger and they are awarded to the President and vice-president respectively. The Presiding Judge in the Supreme Court and the Chairman of the Senate are former officials Grand Commanders in the Order of the Niger.

The Nigerians have followed the British example in the form and structure of the Order. There are also post-nominal letters for the members of the Order of the Niger.

There is a Civil Division and a Military Division. The ribbon of the latter division has a small red line in the middle.

== Grades ==
The order has four grades:

- Grand Commander of the Order of the Federal Republic (GCFR)
- Commander of the Order of the Federal Republic (CFR)
- Officer of the Order of the Federal Republic (OFR)
- Member of the Order of the Federal Republic (MFR)

== Recipients ==
=== Grand Commander of the Order of the Federal Republic (GCFR) ===
No.	Name	Status	Sector	Class of medal
1	Abdulsalami Abubakar	Former Head of State of Nigeria	Public	GCFR
2	Bola Ahmed Tinubu	President of Nigeria	Public	GCFR
3	Ernest Shonekan	Former Interim Head of State of Nigeria	Public	GCFR
4	Goodluck Jonathan	Former President of Nigeria	Public	GCFR
5	Ibrahim Babangida	Former Head of State of Nigeria	Public	GCFR
6	Johnson Aguiyi-Ironsi	Former Head of State of Nigeria	Public	GCFR
7	Moshood Abiola	Former Presumed President-Elect of Nigeria	Public	GCFR
8	Muhammadu Buhari	Former President of Nigeria	Public	GCFR
9	Muammar Gaddafi	Former Leader of Libya	Public	GCFR
10	Nelson Mandela	Former President of South Africa	Public	GCFR
11	Nnamdi Azikiwe	Former Governor-General and President of Nigeria	Public	GCFR
12	Obafemi Awolowo	Former Premier of Western Region	Public	GCFR
13	Olusegun Obasanjo	Former President of Nigeria	Public	GCFR
14	Queen Elizabeth II	Former Queen of Nigeria	Public	GCFR
15	Sani Abacha	Former Head of State of Nigeria	Public	GCFR
16	Shehu Musa Yar'Adua	Former Deputy Head of State of Nigeria	Public	GCFR
17	Shehu Shagari	Former President of Nigeria	Public	GCFR
18	Umaru Musa Yar'Adua	Former President of Nigeria	Public	GCFR
19	Yakubu Gowon	Former Head of State of Nigeria	Public	GCFR

=== Grand Commander of the Order of the Niger (GCON) ===
No.	Name	Status	Sector	Class of medal
1	Adetokunbo Ademola	Former Chief Justice of Nigeria	Public	GCON
2	Amina J. Mohammed	Former Minister of Environment of Nigeria and Deputy Secretary-General of the United Nations	Public	GCON
3	Anyim Pius Anyim	Former Senate President of Nigeria	Public	GCON
4	Olukayode Ariwoola	Former Chief Justice of Nigeria	Public	GCON
5	Atiku Abubakar	Former Vice President of Nigeria	Public	GCON
6	Bello Maitama Yusuf	Former Minister of Nigeria	Public	GCON
7	Dahiru Musdapher	Former Chief Justice of Nigeria	Public	GCON
8	Emeka Anyaoku	Former Commonwealth Secretary-General	Public	GCON
9	Alex Ekwueme	Former Vice President of Nigeria	Public	GCON
10	Aliko Dangote	Businessman and Philanthropist	Private	GCON
11	Godswill Akpabio	Former Governor of Akwa Ibom State and Senate President of Nigeria	Public	GCON
12	Goodluck Jonathan	Former President of Nigeria	Public	GCON
13	Idris Legbo Kutigi	Former Chief Justice of Nigeria	Public	GCON
14	Joseph Wayas	Former Senate President of Nigeria	Public	GCON
15	Ibrahim Tanko Muhammad	Former Chief Justice of Nigeria	Public	GCON
16	Kashim Shettima	Vice President of Nigeria	Public	GCON
17	Mike Adenuga	Businessman and Philanthropist	Private	GCON
18	Mike Akhigbe	Former Chief of Naval Staff and Vice President of Nigeria	Public	GCON
19	Murtala Nyako	Former Governor of Adamawa State	Public	GCON
20	Namadi Sambo	Former Vice President of Nigeria	Public	GCON
21	Narendra Modi	Prime Minister of India	Public	GCON
22	Ngozi Okonjo-Iweala	Former Minister of Finance of Nigeria and Director-General of the World Trade Organization	Public	GCON
23	Oba (Dr.) Sikiru Kayode Adetona	Oba of Ijebuland	Public	GCON
24	Ahmad Lawan	Former Senate President of Nigeria	Public	GCON
25	Siddiq Abubakar III	Former Sultan of Sokoto	Public	GCON
26	Yemi Osinbajo	Former Vice President of Nigeria	Public	GCON
27	Tajudeen Abbas	Speaker of the House of Representatives of Nigeria	Public	GCON

=== Commander of the Order of the Federal Republic (CFR) ===
No.	Name	Status	Sector	Class of medal
1	Abba Kyari	Former Chief of Staff to the President of Nigeria	Public	CFR
2	Gen. Abayomi Olonisakin	Former Chief of Defence Staff of Nigeria	Public	CFR
3	Alhaji Abdul Samad Rabiu	Businessman and Philanthropist	Private	CFR
4	Abubakar Gumi	Islamic Scholar and Leader	Public	CFR
5	Abubakar Shehu Abubakar III	Emir of Gombe	Public	CFR
6	Ahmed Nuhu Bamali	Emir of Zazzau	Public	CFR
7	Alh. Jafar Usman Hore	Businessman and Philanthropist	Private	CFR
8	Alh. Ahmed Rufai Abubakar	Former Director-General of the National Intelligence Agency	Public	CFR
9	Sule Katagum	Former Chairman Public Service Commission	Public	CFR
10	Alwali Kazir	Former Military Officer	Public	CFR
11	Alhaji Aminu Ado Bayero	Emir of Kano	Public	CFR
12	Aminu Tambuwal	Former Governor of Sokoto State and Senator	Public	CFR
13	Justice Ayo Salami	Former President of the Court of Appeal	Public	CFR
14	Vice Admiral Awwal Zubairu Gambo	Former Chief of Naval Staff	Public	CFR
15	Maj. Gen. Babagana Monguno (Rtd)	Former National Security Adviser	Public	CFR
16	Maj. Gen. Bashir Salihu Magashi (Rtd)	Former Minister of Defence	Public	CFR
17	Boss Mustapha	Former Secretary to the Government of the Federation	Public	CFR
18	Hon Justice Clara Bata Ogunbiyi	Former Justice of the Supreme Court	Public	CFR
19	Clement Isong	Former Governor of Cross River State	Public	CFR
20	Daniel Aladesanmi II	Traditional Ruler (Deji of Akure)	Public	CFR
21	Emmanuel Iwuanyanwu	Businessman and Community Leader	Private	CFR
22	Eruani Azibapu Godbless	Businessman and Philanthropist	Private	CFR
23	Omo N'Oba N'Edo Uku Akpolokpolo Ewuare II	Oba of Benin	Public	CFR
24	Lt. Gen. Faruk Yahaya	Former Chief of Army Staff	Public	CFR
25	Femi Gbajabiamila	Former Speaker of the House of Representatives	Public	CFR
26	Folashede Yemi-Esan	Head of the Civil Service of the Federation	Public	CFR
27	Oba Gabriel Adejuwon	Traditional Ruler (Owa Obokun of Ijesha)	Public	CFR
28	Godwin Emefiele	Former Governor of the Central Bank of Nigeria	Public	CFR
29	Senator Hadi Abubakar Sirika	Former Minister of Aviation	Public	CFR
30	Col. Hameed Ibrahim Ali (Rtd)	Former Comptroller-General of the Nigeria Customs Service	Public	CFR
31	Herbert Wigwe	Former Group Managing Director of Access Bank Plc	Private	CFR
32	Vice Admiral Ibok Ekwe Ibas	Former Chief of Naval Staff	Public	CFR
33	Lt. Gen. Ibrahim Attahiru	Former Chief of Army Staff	Public	CFR
34	Air Marshal Isiaka Oladayo Amao	Former Chief of Air Staff	Public	CFR
35	Da. Jacob Gyang Buba	Traditional Ruler (Gbong Gwom Jos)	Public	CFR
36	Prof. James Ortese Ayatse	Traditional Ruler (Tor Tiv V)	Public	CFR
37	Jim Ovia	Businessman and Founder of Zenith Bank Plc	Private	CFR
38	Justice Kudirat MO Kekere-Ekun	Chief Justice of Nigeria	Public	CFR
39	Lt. Gen. Lamidi Adeosun	Former Chief of Army Staff	Public	CFR
40	Gen. Lucky Irabor	Former Chief of Defence Staff	Public	CFR
41	Mohammed Adamu	Former Inspector-General of Police	Public	CFR
42	Mohammed Bello Adoke	Former Attorney-General of the Federation	Public	CFR
43	Justice Monica Bolna'an Dongban-Mensem	President of the Court of Appeal	Public	CFR
44	Alh. Muhammadu Abali Ibn Muhammadu Idrissa	Emir of Fika	Public	CFR
45	Sultan Muhammadu Maccido	Former Sultan of Sokoto	Public	CFR
46	Justice Musa Dattijo Muhammad	Former Justice of the Supreme Court	Public	CFR
47	Ngozi Okonjo-Iweala	Former Minister of Finance and Director-General of the World Trade Organization	Public	CFR
48	Ntenyin Solomon Daniel Etuk, JP	Traditional Ruler (Oku Ibom Ibibio)	Public	CFR
49	Oba (Dr) Aladetoyinbo Ogunlade Aladelusi Odundun II	Traditional Ruler (Deji of Akure)	Public	CFR
50	Oba Babatunde Adewale-Ajayi	Traditional Ruler (Akarigbo of Remo)	Public	CFR
51	Ogiame Atuwatse III	Olu of Warri	Public	CFR
52	Olumuyiwa Benard Aliu	Former President of the ICAO Council	Public	CFR
53	Orodje Of Okpe Kingdom, Orhue 1	Traditional Ruler (Orodje of Okpe)	Public	CFR
54	Ovie Omo-Agege	Former Deputy Senate President	Public	CFR
55	Sultan Sa'adu Abubakar	Sultan of Sokoto	Public	CFR
56	Air Marshal Sadique Abubakar	Former Chief of Air Staff	Public	CFR
57	Justice Sidi Bage Muhammad I (JSC Rtd)	Former Justice of the Supreme Court	Public	CFR
58	Solomon Ehigiator Arase	Former Inspector-General of Police	Public	CFR
59	Lt. Gen. Taoreed Lagbaja	Chief of Army Staff	Public	CFR
60	Tony Elumelu	Businessman and Chairman of United Bank for Africa Plc	Private	CFR
61	Lt. Gen. Tukur Yusuf Buratai	Former Chief of Army Staff	Public	CFR
62	Usman Alkali Baba	Former Inspector-General of Police	Public	CFR
63	Victoria Gowon	Former First Lady of Nigeria	Public	CFR
64	Chief Wole Olanipekun	Legal Practitioner and Former President of the Nigerian Bar Association	Public	CFR
65	Yahaya Abubakar	Traditional Ruler (Etsu Nupe)	Public	CFR
66	Yusuf Magaji Bichi	Director-General of the Department of State Services	Public	CFR

=== Officer of the Order of the Federal Republic (OFR) ===
No.	Name	Status	Sector	Class of medal
1	AbdulRaheem Amoo Oladimeji	Founder of Al-Hikmah University	Private	OFR
2	Abdullahi Umar Ganduje	Former Governor of Kano State	Public	OFR
3	Abubakar Jafar Usman	Traditional Ruler	Public	OFR
4	Adebayo Adelabu	Former Deputy Governor of the Central Bank of Nigeria, and Minister of Power	Public	OFR
5	Adesoye J. Omololu	Pharmacist and Philanthropist	Private	OFR
6	Afe Babalola, SAN	Lawyer and Founder of Afe Babalola University Ado Ekiti(ABUAD)	Private	OFR
7	Alh. Ahmadu Ali Negedu	Businessman and Community Leader	Private	OFR
8	Alex Otti	Governor of Abia State	Public	OFR
9	Audu Ogbeh	Former Minister of Agriculture and Politician	Public	OFR
10	Ayo Oritsejafor	Religious Leader and Former President of the Christian Association of Nigeria	Public	OFR
11	Babatunde Jose	Journalist and Former Chairman of Daily Times	Private	OFR
12	Buhari Bala	Former Minister of State	Public	OFR
13	Chris Igwe	Businessman and Industrialist	Private	OFR
14	Christopher E. Abebe	Former Chairman of United Africa Company of Nigeria	Private	OFR
15	Christopher Gwabin Musa	Chief of Defence Staff	Public	OFR
16	Dahiru Usman Bauchi	Islamic Scholar and Tijaniyya Leader	Public	OFR
17	Emmanuel Iwuanyanwu	Businessman and Community Leader	Private	OFR
18	Grace Alele-Williams	Former Vice-Chancellor of the University of Benin	Public	OFR
19	Habeeb Okunola	Businessman and Philanthropist	Private	OFR
20	Ibrahim Ndahi Auta	Former Chief Judge of the Federal High Court	Public	OFR
21	Idris Legbo Kutigi	Former Chief Justice of Nigeria	Public	OFR
22	Ignatius Ayau Kaigama	Catholic Archbishop of Abuja	Public	OFR
23	Innocent Umezulike	Former Chief Judge of Enugu State	Public	OFR
24	John Kayode Jegede	Businessman and Community Leader	Private	OFR
25	John Kennedy Opara	Religious Leader	Public	OFR
26	Julius Rone	LNG Philanthropic Oil Merchant	Private	OFR
27	Justice Abdullahi N. Mustapha	Former University Vice-Chancellor	Public	OFR
28	Adamu Aliyu	Former Chief Judge	Public	OFR
29	Suleiman A. Kawu Sumaila	Former Senator and House of Representatives Member	Public	OFR
30	Lere Paimo	Actor and Filmmaker	Private	OFR
31	Magaji Muhammed	Former Public Servant	Public	OFR
32	Muhammad Indimi	Businessman and Philanthropist	Private	OFR
33	Musa Halilu Ahmed	Businessman and Traditional Ruler (Dujima of Adamawa)	Private	OFR
34	Nasiru Ado Bayero	Emir of Bichi	Public	OFR
35	S. A. Ajayi	Former Public Servant	Public	OFR
36	Alh. Shehu Malami	Former Diplomat and Traditional Leader	Public	OFR
37	Shettima Mustapha	Former Minister of Agriculture	Public	OFR
38	Sylvanus C. Ghasarah	Former Public Servant	Public	OFR
39	Temitope Balogun Joshua	Nigerian Charismatic Pastor, Televangelist, and Philanthropist	Private	OFR
40	Dr. T. I. Obiaga	Medical Practitioner and Philanthropist	Private	OFR
41	Taiwo Akinkunmi	Designer of the Nigerian Flag	Public	OFR
42	Tijjani Muhammad-Bande	Former President of the United Nations General Assembly	Public	OFR
43	Victor Ndoma-Egba, SAN	Lawyer and Former Senate Leader	Public	OFR
44	Wazirin Katagum (Dr) Alhaji Sule Katagum	Former Public Servant	Public	OFR
45	Kenneth Ifekudu	Businessman and philanthropist	Private	OFR
46	Aisha Sulaiman Achimugu	Business executive and philanthropist	Private	OFR

=== Officer of the Order of the Niger (OON) ===
No.	Name	Status	Sector	Class of medal
1	Imam Abdullahi Abubakar	Islamic Scholar and Community Leader	Public	OON
2	Alhaji Shehu Uthman	Businessman and Community Leader	Private	OON
3	Maj.Gen. Bitrus Vandos Themoi Kwaji	Retired Military Officer	Public	OON
4	Dr Ado J.G Muhammad	Public Health Expert	Private	OON
5	Chris Ezem	Legal Practitioner and Community Leader	Private	OON
6	Eze Isaac Ikonne	Traditional Ruler	Public	OON
7	Faisal Shuaibu	Businessman and Philanthropist	Private	OON
8	Mallam Ibrahim Okposi	Community Leader	Private	OON
9	Imoro Goodrich Kubor	Community Leader	Private	OON
10	Alh. Kamoru Ibitoye Yusuf	Businessman and Industrialist	Private	OON
11	Chief Silva Ejeh Ameh	Traditional Ruler	Public	OON
12	Prince Dr. Tajudeen Oluyole Olusi	Community Leader and Politician	Public	OON
13	Seyi Vodi	Businessman and Fashion Designer	Public	OON

=== Member of the Order of the Federal Republic (MFR) ===
No.	Name	Status	Sector	Class of medal
1	Abraham Ayebakepreye Amba Ambaiowei	Former Public Servant	Public	MFR
2	Prof Adebayo M. A. Ninalowo	Academic and Sociologist	Public	MFR
3	Agbani Darego	Model and Former Miss World	Private	MFR
4	Ahmad Muhammadu Tukur	Traditional Ruler	Public	MFR
5	Ajibola Akindele	Businessman and Community Leader	Private	MFR
6	Albatan Yerima Balla	Former Public Servant	Public	MFR
7	Alhaji Sule Bawa	Traditional Ruler	Public	MFR
8	Angus Fraser (clergyman and teacher)	Clergyman and Teacher	Public	MFR
9	Anthonia Ifeoma Opara	Public Servant	Public	MFR
10	Ayodele Anthony Aderinwale	Community Leader and Development Expert	Private	MFR
11	Bankole Reinhard Oyebode	Public Servant and Politician	Public	MFR
12	Genevieve Nnaji	Actress, Director and Producer	Private	MFR
13	Bashir Adewale Adeniyi	Comptroller-General of the Nigeria Customs Service	Public	MFR
14	Bimbo Ogunade	Entertainment Executive	Private	MFR
15	Burna Boy	Musician and Songwriter	Private	MFR
16	Barr. Chris Ezem	Legal Practitioner and Community Leader	Private	MFR
17	Col. Andrawus Pillasar Sawa	Former Military Officer	Public	MFR
18	Col. Bala Mande (Rtd)	Former Military Officer	Public	MFR
19	Mrs. Comfort Nwobu	Community Leader	Private	MFR
20	Demenongo Apollonius	Community Leader	Private	MFR
21	Brig. Gen. Dzarma Kennedy Zirkushu	Former Military Officer	Public	MFR
22	Elton Irene Edorhe	Community Leader	Private	MFR
23	Emmanuel Iwuanyanwu	Businessman and Community Leader	Private	MFR
24	Lady Eno Bassey	Community Leader	Private	MFR
25	Evang. Blessing Bassey	Religious Leader	Public	MFR
26	Prince Nicholas Ukachukwu	Businessman, Politician, and Philanthropist	Private	MFR
27	William Troost-Ekong	Nigerian Professional Footballer	Public	MFR
