= Ifeoluwa Ehindero =

Nigerian politician (born 1985)

Honourable representing Akoko North East/Akoko North West
- Incumbent
- Assumed office February 2024
- Preceded by: Olubunmi Tunji-Ojo

Personal details
- Party: All Progressives Congress
- Profession: Politician; Philanthropist; Businessman

Ifeoluwa Ehindero is a Nigerian politician and philanthropist. He is the incumbent member of the Federal House of Representative representing Akoko North East/Akoko North West after winning the bye election on the ticket of All Progressive Congress.

As a philanthropist, he contributed to the health, educational and agricultural sector of his community.

== Political career ==
Ehindero contested for the election as a member representing Akoko North East/Akoko North West in the House of representatives replacing Tunji Bunmi Ojo following his appointment as Minister for Interior by President Bola Tinubu. The bye election was held by Independent National Electoral Commission on 3 February 2024, which he won with 35,504 votes defeating his closest rival, Olalekan Bada from Peoples Democratic Party who had 15,328 votes.
