= Tafa Balogun =

Nigerian police officer (1947–2022)

Mustafa Adebayo Balogun

11th Inspector General of Police
- In office March 2002 – January 2005
- President: Olusegun Obasanjo
- Preceded by: Musiliu Smith
- Succeeded by: Sunday Ehindero

Personal details
- Born: 25 August 1947 Ila Orangun, Colony and Protectorate of Nigeria
- Died: 4 August 2022 (aged 74)
- Occupation: Police officer

Mustafa Adebayo Balogun (25 August 1947 – 4 August 2022), widely known as Kumawu, was a Nigerian police officer, 11th Inspector General of Police from March 2002, but was forced to retire because of widespread charges of corruption in January 2005.

== Background ==
Balogun attended the University of Lagos, graduating in 1972 with a B.A. in Political Science. He joined the Nigeria Police Force in May 1973. While a police officer, he gained a law degree from the University of Ibadan. After working in various positions around the country, he became Principal Staff Officer to former Inspector-General of Police, Muhammadu Gambo, then Deputy Commissioner of Police in Edo State, and then Commissioner of Police first in Delta State and then in Rivers State and Abia State. He was appointed Assistant Inspector General of Police in A.I.G. Zone One Kano, the position he held when promoted to Inspector General of Police on 6 March 2002.

In November 2001, as A.I.G., Balogun reassured reporters that there were provisions to ensure the safety of businessmen in Nigeria through the outfit called Diplomatic Corp and Foreign National Protection Unit.

== Inspector General of Police ==
Balogun became IGP in March 2002, replacing Musiliu Smith. He was responsible for overall police security during the April 2003 national elections, which were marred by reports of police abuses. In August 2003, Balogun presented a paper on "Nigeria: Electoral Violence and National Security" in which he advocated improvements such as use of national identity cards, mass education, electoral law reforms, citizens participation in politics, good governance and establishment of a constitutional court.

In December 2003, Balogun organised extensive security measures across Nigeria to ensure that there were no disturbances during the Commonwealth of Nations summit. Following various incidents in 2004 where reporters were beaten and their equipment damaged by policemen, Balogun made apologies and promised that those responsible would be punished.

Towards the end of 2004, newspapers published allegations of corruption on a massive scale, asserting that Balogun had pocketed public money and taken bribes from politicians and criminals. These led to his forced retirement in January 2005.

== Later career ==
On 4 April 2005, Balogun was arraigned at the Federal High Court, Abuja on charges involving about N13 billion obtained through money laundering, theft and other sources. The Economic and Financial Crimes Commission under Nuhu Ribadu brought 70 charges against Balogun covering the period from 2002 to 2004. He made a plea bargain with the court in exchange for returning much of the property and money. He was sentenced to six months in jail. He was released on 9 February 2006 after serving his sentence, part of it in Abuja National Hospital.

In November 2008 and again in February 2009, the Chairman of the House Committee on Police Affairs, Abdul Ahmed Ningi, asked the Inspector General of Police Mike Okiro, to provide details of the money recovered from Balogun, a request that he passed on to the EFCC chairman, Farida Waziri. However, the EFCC stated that they did not have records of the exact properties recovered from Balogun. It was said that some of the houses had been secretly sold to certain individuals at give-away prices. In April 2009, the House of Representatives Committee on Police Affairs invited Balogun, Mike Okiro and Farida Waziri to explain how the N16 billion allegedly recovered from Balogun went missing.

He died on 4 August 2022.
