= Human Rights Violations Investigation Commission =

Nigerian truth commission

- "Oputa Panel"

Agency overview
- Formed: 14 June 1999
- Dissolved: May 2002
- Type: Truth commission
- Jurisdiction: Nigeria, 1984–1999

Nigeria's Human Rights Violations Investigation Commission, also known as the Oputa Panel after its leader Chukwudifu Oputa, was a commission that was developed following the collapse of the military dictatorship that controlled Nigeria until 1998. It was created by newly elected President Olusegun Obasanjo in 1999. Its mandate was to investigate human rights during the period of military rule from 1984 to 1999. In terms of reconciliation, the commission also worked towards unifying communities previously in conflict. The commission submitted its final report to President Obasanjo in 2002, but the government has not taken any action to date. Its report was not released to the public until 2005, when it was published by two activist groups, the Nigerian Democratic Movement and Nigeria-based Civil Society Forum.

== Background ==
Nigeria was under British rule up until 1960. After independence, there were many internal conflicts within the country that limited Nigeria’s ability to consolidate. The country was divided along religious and ethnic lines which led to mass killings and eventually, a full civil war that would last until 1970. With Nigeria under the control of a military dictatorship following the 1966 Nigerian coup d'état, other coups continued to take place. General Ibrahim Babangida, the head of the military juntas beginning in 1985, was forced out of power in 1993 due to the riots throughout the country following his decision to cancel the election. Under Defense Minister Sani Abacha, who took his place as president, violence continued. Abacha was accused of extensive human rights violations. After his death in 1998, an election saw Olusegun Obasanjo take power. Obasanjo embarked on reforms including the creation of the Human Rights Violations Investigation Commission.

== Mandate ==
When first called into action, The Human Rights Violations Investigation Commission's main focus was human rights violations and cases of abuse under Nigeria's military regime between 1984 and 1999. The commission was also mandated to work towards reconciliation of the various communities and groups of people present in Nigeria that were in conflict with one another when under the military regime. Its investigation was to be carried out and completed over the course of three months. Over a period of time however, the commission shifted its main focus to "gross human rights violations" and demanded more time to carry out its investigation and to extend the period under investigation to include the events which occurred from 1966 to 1990.

== Process ==
After this commission was created, it began with the process of taking into account the experiences of victims of the military regime. There was an outpouring of stories from Nigerians who explained the types or violations and abuses that they faced. The commission received up to 10,000 victim recollections with most reporting unfair treatment within the economic domain -- more specifically, unfair treatment in the work place. Public hearings spanned more than a year, bringing the stories of the victims and perpetrators forward to the public as these hearings were televised on every occasion. Only 150 out of the 10,000 recollections of abuse that they received from victims were heard. Limited funds meant that investigation into the human rights violations was limited to the public hearings. The commission’s investigation consisted of

- acquiring information about human rights violations through recollections provided by the victims
- bringing to light the identity of those who were involved in committing these crimes, and
- gaining a better understanding as to why these crimes were committed in the first place.

The commission also played a role in establishing peace agreements between various Nigerian communities.

== Findings and recommendations ==
The commission produced a report which concluded that the military’s control over the politics of Nigeria was one of the primary reasons for human rights violations and for continued political, social, and economic troubles in Nigeria. The commission also concluded that those who held positions of power, those who were a part of the military, and upper-class Nigerian citizens worked together to carry out the military coups. Furthermore, the commission concluded that the Ministry of Justice played a role in protecting those who were responsible for committing human rights violations. The commission recommended that victims be given reparations. Finally, it recommended that Nigeria focus on eliminating corruption, especially corruption within government.

== Follow-up ==
The Human Rights Violations Investigation Commission of Nigeria submitted its final report to the president in 2002, but he did not bring the report to public attention. This decision reportedly was because of a case brought to the Supreme Court in 2003 by two former military leaders against the commission over its power to make them testify. Nigeria's Supreme Court ruled that the power to hold public hearings lies with the state governments of Nigeria and not the federal government, according to the Constitution of 1999. After this case, it was not until 2005 that two activist groups, the Nigerian Democratic Movement and Nigeria-based Civil Society Forum, finally published the commission’s report online. The report was already in the public realm, but the government limited its availability and accessibility. Subsequently, state governments in Nigeria began to establish their own truth and reconciliation commissions. The federal government has not implemented the commission;s recommendations. Following its reconciliation processes, the commission was successful in reconciling communities in Maroko village, in the Ogun State, and the various groups in Ogoni Island.
