= Solomon Arase =

Nigerian police officer (1956–2025)

Solomon Ehigiator Arase

18th Inspector General of Police
- In office April 2015 – 21 June 2016
- Preceded by: Suleiman Abba
- Succeeded by: Ibrahim Kpotun Idris

Personal details
- Born: 21 June 1956 Owan West, Federation of Nigeria
- Died: 31 August 2025 (aged 69) Abuja, Nigeria
- Education: Ahmadu Bello University; University of Benin
- Occupation: Police officer
- Awards: National Police Medal (2013), fdc, FCIArb, CFR

Solomon Ehigiator Arase (21 June 1956 – 31 August 2025) was a Nigerian police officer. He was also a chairman of the Nigeria Police Service Commission. He was appointed Chairman in January 2023 by the Late President Muhammadu Buhari. Arase also served as the 18th Inspector-General of Nigerian Police (IGP) after Suleiman Abba was sacked. Before his appointment as IGP, Arase was head of the topmost intelligence gathering unit of the Nigerian police, the Criminal Intelligence and Investigation Bureau.

== Life and career ==
Arase was born on 21 June 1956, in Owan West Local Government, Edo state in Federation of Nigeria. He attended Ahmadu Bello University for his undergraduate studies and graduated with political science degree in 1980. He was recruited into the Nigerian Police a year after on 1 December 1981. He also obtained another bachelor's degree in Law from University of Benin as well as Masters from University of Lagos.

While in the Police service, Arase served in various capacities, including being the Commissioner of Police in Akwa Ibom State. Arase was also the Principal Secretary to the former Inspector-General of Police, Tarfa Balogun, at the Louis Edet House, under the President Olusegun Obasanjo administration, as well as serving in the intelligence gathering unit as Assistant Inspector-General. He is a Fellow of the Nigerian Defence Academy and had served in Namibia during the United Nations peacekeeping operation. Arase was appointed as the IG of the Police under the Goodluck Jonathan Administration. One of the infamous happenings under his watch as the IG of police was the Agatu Massacre in Benue State, Nigeria, by armed Herdsmen, to which President Goodluck Jonathan sent him to Agatu to assess the damage.

Arase retired from the force on 21 June 2016. On 21 June 2016, President Muhammadu Buhari appointed Ibrahim Kpotum Idris as Acting Inspector General of the Nigeria Police Force. After his retirement from Police service, Arase was appointed Chairman of a Task Force responsible for the implementation of a state Anti-Community Development Association Law in Edo State.

Arase dedicated his post-retirement undertakings to legal practice, Security Consultancy with organizations such as the Office of the National Security Adviser (ONSA), the European Centre for Electoral Support, the Human Rights Centre at the University of Oslo, Public Speaking, Research and other Academic engagements. He is a member of the Committee on Prevention of Torture, Geneva Switzerland currently developing a universal protocol on Investigative Techniques. On 24 January 2023, Arase was appointed Chairman of the Nigeria Police Service Commission by President Muhammadu Buhari.

Arase died on 31 August 2025, at the age of 69.

== Awards ==
In October 2022, a Nigerian national honour of Commander of the Order of the Federal Republic (CFR) was conferred on him by President Muhammadu Buhari.
