= Asheik Jarma =

Nigerian politician

Governor of Borno State
- In office 1 October 1983 – 31 December 1983
- Preceded by: Mohammed Goni
- Succeeded by: Abubakar Waziri

Asheik Jarma was elected Governor of Borno State, Nigeria in October 1983, holding office briefly until the military coup on 31 December 1983 that brought General Mohammadu Buhari to power. He was elected on the National Party of Nigeria (NPN) platform.

In the lead up to restoration of democracy in 1999, Jarma was a founding member of the People's Democratic Party (PDP). In April 2001, the PDP suspended Jarma from its board of trustees for one month for flirting with other political associations. In November 2001, he was a member of the interim contact and mobilisation committee for the newly formed United Nigeria Democratic Party (UNDP).

In July 2008, a Senate ad hoc committee probing a food crisis implicated Jarma among others for abandoning £11.4 million worth of silo contracts. In October 2009, he denied that he had attended the kick-off meeting of the recently launched National Democratic Movement (NDM) and said he had always been a bona fide member of the PDP. In December 2009, Jarma endorsed the PDP candidature of Ambassador Saidu Pindar for Borno Governor in the 2011 elections.
