= Okija Shrine =

Religious shrine in Okija, Anambra State, Nigeria

Okija Shrine or Ogwuwu Akpu is a dreaded shrine located in Okija, a town in Ihiala local government of Anambra State, Eastern Nigeria. On 3 August 2004, the shrine was invaded by a team of policemen led by former Anambra State Commissioner of Police Felix Ogbaudu who arrested over 40 native doctors, keepers and attendants. Over 70 dead human bodies and skulls were discovered in the premise of the shrine.

== History ==
Okija Shrine was a dispute settlement shrine where people with personal, land and business issues go to in order to seek adjudication by the gods. But as Mrs Bridget Obi, an Okija native & former Commissioner for Women Affairs, Anambra State pointed out “what happened there [in recent times, that led the police to invade the place] was not the culture of our people. Traditional religion was not what we saw in that place. What we saw was just barbaric dehumanisation.”

== Relationship with Nigerian politicians ==
Over the years, Okija Shrine is believed to have been patronized by influential Nigerian politicians. In 2003, it was revealed that former Anambra State governor, Chris Ngige visited the shrine in the company of Chris Uba to swear an oath of allegiance to his "political godfathers" on winning the 2003 Anambra State gubernatorial election.
