= Adamu Aliyu =

Nigerian politician

Adamu Aliyu of Gummi

Member of the House of Representatives
- Constituency: Gummi II

Personal details
- Born: 1990 (age 35–36) Gumi, Zamfara State, Nigeria
- Occupation: Politician

Adamu Aliyu of Gummi is a Nigerian politician and lawmaker from Gumi in Zamfara State, Nigeria. He was born in 1990. Aliyu has served in the Zamfara State House of Representatives, representing the Gummi II constituency.
