= Hushpuppi =

Nigerian fraudster (born 1982)

Ramon Olorunwa Abbas
- Born: Ramon Olorunwa Abbas; 11 October 1982 (age 43); Lagos State, Nigeria
- Occupations: Fraudster, cybercriminal

Instagram information
- Page: hushpuppi
- Years active: 2011–2020
- Genres: Lifestyle, fashion, luxury

Ramon Olorunwa Abbas (born 11 October 1982), commonly known as Hushpuppi, Hush, or Ray Hushpuppi is a Dubai-based Nigerian Instagram influencer, self-proclaimed real estate mogul, fraudster, and cybercriminal. He was sentenced in the United States to 11 years for conspiracy to launder money obtained from business email compromise frauds and other scams, including schemes that defrauded a US law firm out of approximately $40 million, illegally transferred $14.7 million from a foreign financial institution, and targeted to steal $124 million from an English Premier League club.

Before his arrest by the Dubai Police in June 2020 and subsequent extradition to the United States, Abbas was renowned for posting pictures and videos of his lavish spending on cars, watches, designer clothes, bags from expensive brands such as Gucci, Fendi and Louis Vuitton, and of boarding helicopters with celebrities, footballers and Nigerian politicians or on charter jets. He claimed to be a real estate developer. He also holds a passport from St Kitts and Nevis, which was fraudulently obtained through a sham marriage to a St. Kitts and Nevis citizen.

On the night his apartment at the Palazzo Versace was raided in an operation code-named Fox Hunt 2, Abbas was arrested alongside Young Chainz, Logic, Ziko and Olalekan Ponle in simultaneous raids. Detectives seized more than 150 million dirhams (about $40 million) in cash, 13 luxury cars worth Dh 25 million ($7 million), 21 laptops, 47 smartphones, 15 memory storage devices, five external hard drives and 800,000 emails of potential victims. The arrest was part of an FBI investigation that indicted him as being a "key player" in a transnational cybercrime network that provided "safe havens for stolen money around the world."

== Early life ==
Several popular news platforms have reported that Abbas was once a second-hand clothes trader in Lagos, Nigeria. Abbas prided himself on his humble beginnings. Abbas's close associate Mompha once revealed that his father is a cab driver in Lagos. TheCable.ng reported that Abbas had a reputation as a "Yahoo Yahoo boy", a local Nigerian title for a cybercriminal; that he was not supported by his mother, had not lifted any of his old friends from poverty, and had ignored multiple warnings regarding his lifestyle.

He is the subject of the 2017 song "Telli Person" by Nigerian singer Timaya featuring Olamide and Phyno, with whom he had a long-running feud. The song contained lyrics directed toward Abbas, indirectly accusing him of being a swindler and lavishing his money on designer clothes instead of investing in profitable ventures and warning him that he would soon be caught by authorities. Many viewed the song as a prophetic warning that was fulfilled with his arrest.

== Fraud allegations ==
Upon his arrival in the United States on 3 July 2020, Abbas was accused of conspiring to launder 'hundreds of millions of dollars'.

The affidavit also accused Abbas and a co-conspirator of conspiring to launder funds intended to be stolen through fraudulent wire transfers from a 'foreign financial institution', totalling approximately US$14.7 million, in February 2019. Though the affidavit did not name any bank, according to Forbes, the date of the attack and amount mentioned in the affidavit matched that of the attack on Malta's Bank of Valletta in February 2019. $14.7 million was transferred out of the bank through false international transactions to accounts in the United States, the United Kingdom, Czech Republic and Hong Kong. The attack was of such significance in Malta that the then Prime Minister, Joseph Muscat, was forced to address parliament. Multiple sources in Malta including Times of Malta and Malta Today also repeated Forbes's claims that Abbas could have been behind the attack. According to the affidavit, Abbas provided a co-conspirator with two European bank accounts anticipating the receipt of $5.6 million each of the fraudulently obtained funds. U.S. authorities also accused him of aiding North Korean hackers in money laundering.

According to the affidavit, other communications between Abbas and a co-conspirator indicated that the two had conspired to "launder tens, and at times hundreds, of millions of dollars that were proceeds of other fraudulent schemes and computer intrusions, including a scheme to steal £100 million from an English Premier League football club.

Abbas is also accused of committing fraud in Nigeria as he is also wanted by Nigeria's financial crime police, the Economic and Financial Crimes Commission.

A request for his bail and the chance to stay with his girlfriend's uncle in Homewood, Illinois, was denied on the grounds that he presented a risk of non-appearance. At Abbas' detention hearing, his lawyer told the court that his client posed no flight risk because of the damage it would do to his credibility online, saying "He is loved and respected. He is a celebrity. He would not want to ruin his credibility and status rather than stay here and face these allegations." Prosecutors cited his "significant" financial assets, "deep ties to foreign countries" and a lack of ties to the United States.

An article in Bloomberg Businessweek details his actions leading to his arrest, incarceration, and a trial on 27 July 2021, in Los Angeles. "Authorities say Ramon Abbas, aka Hushpuppi, perfected a simple internet scam and laundered millions of dollars. His past says a lot about digital swagger and the kinds of stories that get told online."

On 28 July 2021, Abbas pleaded guilty to money laundering and also identified a Deputy Commissioner of Police in Nigeria, Abba Kyari, as an accomplice in his $1.1 million scam deal. The following day, a US Court granted an FBI warrant to arrest Kyari. The Police chief was further implicated after his conversation with Abbas was released.

In a final appeal to Judge Otis Wright ahead of his scheduled sentencing on 19 September 2022, Abbas wrote a letter to the court explaining his source of wealth, criminal activities and regrets. He apologised to his family members for bringing them shame while commending the FBI for having done a thorough job bringing him to justice.

On 19 September 2022, Judge Otis Wright delayed Abbas's sentencing to 3 November 2022. The judge had initially rejected the plea of the defendant's motion for a delay of judgement. On 8 November 2022, Abbas was sentenced to over 11 years in a federal prison. He is currently imprisoned at FCI Fort Dix in New Jersey and has a scheduled release date of 6 August 2029.

== In the media ==
In November 2022, the rapper 50 Cent announced plans on Instagram to produce a television series on the life of Abbas, including his fraudulent career path and sentencing. A short documentary about Abbas has been published by both Bloomberg and BBC Africa.
