= National Institute for Policy and Strategic Studies =

Nigerian government policy making institution

The National Institute for Policy and Strategic Studies (NIPSS) is a policy formation center for bureaucrats, private sector leaders, military officers, and medium- and senior-ranking civil servants. It is also regarded as a think tank for policy-making in Nigeria. NIPSS was established in 1979. Its first Director General was Major General Ogundeko. The current Director General is Ayo Omotayo. Notable graduates of the NIPSS are General Ibrahim Babangida the former Nigerian Head of State, and Nuhu Ribadu, famed former anti-corruption czar who is also the current National Security Adviser to President Tinubu, and former head of the SSS, Ita Ekpeyong.

== Directors general ==
Director General the National Institute
S/N	Name	Beginning of term	End of term
1	Major General T.B Ogundeko	September 1979	March 1981
2	Justice Tseayo	April 1981	November 1984
3	Major General Charles Ndiomu	December 1984	January 1990
4	Major General Paul Ufuoma Omu	January 1990	December 1992
5	Muhammad Nur Alkali	December 1992	October 1999
6	Major General Joseph Nanven Garba	October 1999	June 2002
7	Major General Martin Chukwudi Osahor	June 2002	April 2004
8	Ugo Alubo	April 2004	May 2005 (acting)
9	Akin Akindoyeni	May 2005	July 2008
10	Yakubu Sankey	July 2008	October 2008 (acting)
11	JK Opadiran	October 2008	March 2009 (acting)
12	Shuaibu Ahmed Danfulani	March 2009	May 2010
13	Tijjani Mohammad-Bande	May 2010	February 2016
14	Jonathan Mela Juma	February 2016	August 2019 (acting)
15	Habu S. Galadima	August 2019	December 2020
16	Brigadier General CFJ Udaya	December 2020	March 2022 (acting)
17	Ayo Omotayo	March 2022	Present

== Notable alumni ==
Notable alumni include:

- Afakriya Gadzama, former director general State Security Service
- Ibrahim Babangida, former Nigerian head of state
- Ita Ekpeyong, former director general State Security Service
- Lawal Musa Daura, acting director general State Security Service
- Nuhu Ribadu, pioneer chairman, Economic and Financial Crimes Commission
- Tunji Olurin, former military governor of Oyo State
- Victor Malu, former chief of Army Staff
- Mohammed Badaru Abubakar, Executive Governor of Jigawa State
- Mohammed Dikko Abubakar, former inspector general of police (Nigeria) IGP
- Aminu Adisa Logun, Kwara State Chief of staff
- Porbeni Festus Bikepre, Admiral in the Nigerian Navy
- Emmanuel Osarunwese Ugowe, former Assistant Inspector Geberal of Police. Monitor General, 1982
- Onuzulike Daniel Okonkwo, former director, Federal Ministry of Communications
- Brigadier General Sani Kukasheka Usman, former Director, Army Public Relations and Nigerian Army Spokesman.
