= Lagos State Police Command =

Branch of Nigeria police force

- Abbreviation: LSP
- Motto: Police is your Dependable Friend and Helper

Jurisdictional structure
- Operations jurisdiction: NG
- Governing body: Federal Government of Nigeria
- General nature: Civilian police

Operational structure
- Agency executive: Moshood Jimoh

Website
- lagos.npf.gov.ng

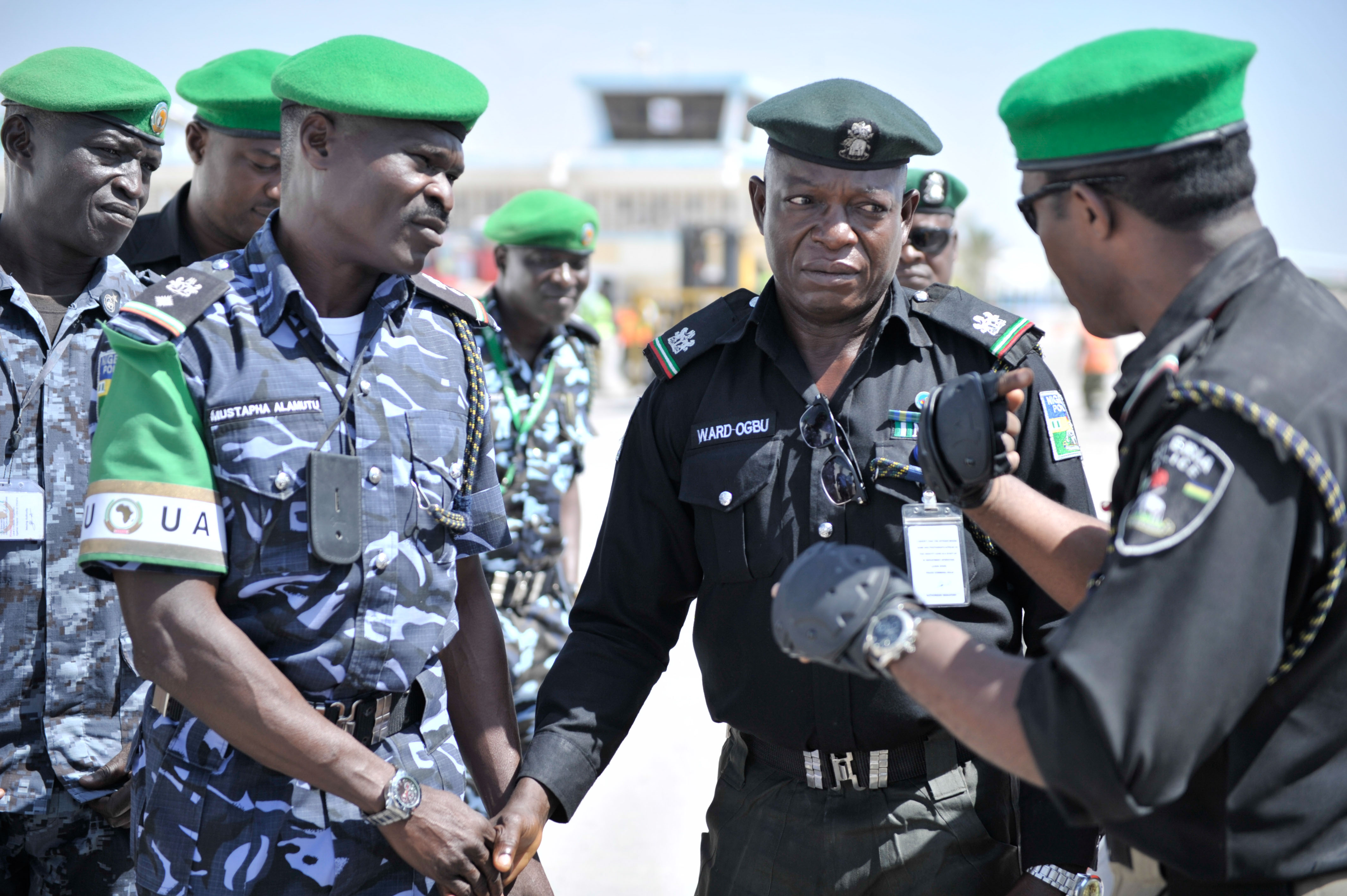
Amisom Mogadishu Regional Commander of the Nigeria Formed Police Unit meets Lagos State Police Command, Ward Ogbu

The Lagos Police Command is the Lagos State branch of the Nigerian Police Force. It is responsible for law enforcement and crime prevention in the state. The commissioner of this command is often appointed by the Inspector-General of Police. The current commissioner of the state command is CP Olanrewaju Olawale Ishola. The Lagos State Police Command has different area commands and zones.

== Leadership ==
- Commissioner Of Police: CP Olanrewaju Olawale Ishola
- Area A- Lagos Island: ACP Aisha Haruna
- Area B-Apapa: ACP Sunday Opebiyi
- Area C-Surulere: ACP Ayoola Oladunni
- Area D-Mushin: ACP Bamidele Awoniyi
- Area E-Festac: ACP Chuks Eburuaja
- Area F-Ikeja: ACP Paul Okafor
- Area G-Ogba: ACP Abayomi Faniyi
- Area H-Ogudu: ACP Rotimi Odutana
- Area J-Ajah/Elemoro: ACP Oluyemisi Ojo
- Area K-Morogbo: ACP Adeleke Smith
- Area L-Ilashe: ACP Adekunle Tokosi
- Area M-Idimu: ACP Olayinka Ajeigbe
- Area N-Ijede/Ikorodu: ACP Musendiq Orobiyi
- Area P-Alagbado/Abesan Estate Gate: ACP Gabriel Folorunsho

== See also ==
- Lagos State Government
- Lagos State Executive Council
- Lagos State Judiciary
