= Inspector General of Police (Nigeria) =

Head of Nigeria police force body

Inspector General of The Nigeria Police Force
- Incumbent; Tunji Disu since 24 February 2026
- Nigeria Police Force
- Style: Inspector General
- Abbreviation: IGP
- Member of: Nigeria Police Council; National Security Council
- Reports to: The President; Minister of Police Affairs
- Residence: Nigeria Police Headquarters, Louis Edet House Shehu Shagari Way, Central Area, Abuja, Nigeria
- Seat: FCT
- Nominator: President of Nigeria
- Appointer: President of Nigeria
- Constituting instrument: Constitution of the Federal Republic of Nigeria
- Formation: 1964
- First holder: Louis Edet
- Website: Official Website of NPF

The Inspector General of Police, abbreviated as IGP is the head of the Nigeria Police Force. He is the most senior officer in the police service. The pioneer IGP is Louis Edet and the current IGP is Tunji Disu.

== Appointment ==
The appointed officer is usually a serving officer of the Nigeria Police Force and is often recommended by the Police Service Commission to the President of Nigeria, who will send the name to the Senate for confirmation.

== List of IGPs ==
- Louis Edet (1964 – 1966)
- Kam Salem (1966 – 1974)
- Muhammadu Dikko Yusufu (1975 – 1979)
- Adamu Suleiman (1979 – 1981)
- Sunday Adewusi (1981 – 1983)
- Etim Inyang (1985 – 1986)
- Muhammadu Gambo Jimeta (1986 – 1990)
- Aliyu Attah (1990 – 1993)
- Ibrahim Coomassie (1993 – 1999)
- Musiliu Smith (1999 – 2002)
- Mustafa Adebayo Balogun (2002 – 2005)
- Sunday Ehindero (2005 – 2007)
- Mike Mbama Okiro (2007 – 2009)
- Ogbonna Okechukwu Onovo (2009 – 2010)
- Hafiz Ringim (2010 – 2012)
- Mohammed Dikko Abubakar (2012 – 2014)
- Suleiman Abba (2014 – 2015)
- Solomon Arase (2015–2016)
- Ibrahim Kpotun Idris (2016–2019)
- Mohammed Adamu (2019–2021)
- Usman Alkali Baba (2021–2023)
- Kayode Egbetokun (2023–2026)
- Tunji Disu (2026-)
