= Abdulrasheed Bawa =

Nigerian detective

Chairman of the EFCC
- In office 24 February 2021 – 14 June 2023
- President: Muhammadu Buhari; Bola Tinubu
- Preceded by: Mohammed Umar Abba
- Succeeded by: Ola Olukayode

Personal details
- Born: 30 April 1980 (age 46) Jega, Kebbi State
- Education: Usmanu Danfodio University
- Occupation: Civil Servant

Abdulrasheed Bawa (born 30 April 1980) is a Nigerian detective and law enforcement agent who served as chairman of the Economic and Financial Crimes Commission (EFCC) from 24 February 2021 to 14 June 2023 when he was suspended on by President Bola Tinubu over allegations of corruption. He replaced Mohammed Umar Abba, the Chairman of the commission. Until his appointment, he was the Deputy Chief Superintendent of the anti-graft agency.

Bawa was nominated as substantive Chairman of EFCC on 16 February 2021, and on 24 February 2021 he was confirmed by the National Assembly as the Executive Chairman, officially taking over from the Ibrahim Magu, the former Chairman of the EFCC.

== Early life ==
Abdulrasheed Bawa was born in 1980 and hails from Jega, Kebbi state.

== Education ==
He obtained his first leaving certificate from Model Primary School Birnin-Kebbi Road, Sokoto in 1991, and got his secondary school certificate from Government Secondary School, Owerri in 1997. In 2001, Bawa graduated from the Usmanu Danfodio University, Sokoto, with a Bachelor of Science degree in Economics. He holds a Master's degree in International Affairs and Diplomacy from the same university in 2012; and currently studying Bachelor of Laws at the University of London.

== Career ==
Abdulrasheed Bawa joined the EFCC as an Assistant Detective Superintendent (ADS) in 2004. He was in October 2015 appointed to head the commission's investigations of Diezani Alison-Madueke, a former Minister of Petroleum Resources and her associates. He has been part of the prosecution of advance fee fraud, official corruption, bank fraud, money laundery and other related crimes. The youngest chairman of EFCC till date. He was trained by the United States Federal Bureau of Investigation (FBI), Financial Crimes Enforcement Network (FINCEN), and United Nations Office on Drugs and Crime (UNODC).

On 14 June 2023, President Bola Tinubu suspended Bawa from his position as Chairman of the EFCC for abuse of office.

== Theft allegation ==
In September 2020, Peoples Gazette in an exclusive report detailed how Bawa stole and sold dozens of petrol-bearing trucks confiscated from suspected looters, auctioning them off to his proxies at ridiculous prices while he was in charge of the Port Harcourt office of the Economic and Financial Crimes Commission. The report stated that Bawa was arrested and detained for several days by the then Acting Chairman of the commission Ibrahim Magu. Bawa was subsequently relieved of his position in Port Harcourt and transferred to the agency's training school in Abuja.

When he was nominated for the position of the Chairman of EFCC after the removal of Magu, civil society organisations condemned the nomination, calling on the Senate of Nigeria to reject his nomination. At the Senate confirmation screening, Bawa denied the allegation of selling seized properties in Port Harcourt.

On 17 February 2021, the Economic and Financial Crimes Commission (EFCC) issued a statement denying reports that the Chairman-designate (now substantive), Abdulrasheed Bawa, was arrested and detained by the agency under former Chairman, Ibrahim Magu, over illegal sale of 244 forfeited trucks to proxies in Port Harcourt. The Commission further stated that Mr. Abdulrasheed Bawa was never at any time arrested nor detained by former acting Chairman of the Commission Ibrahim Magu. The statement signed by Spokesman of the commission, Wilson Ewujaren, said "Mr Bawa was never arrested or detained over sale of any assets. As zonal Head of the Port Harcourt Office of the commission in 2019, Bawa's responsibilities did not include the sale of assets as the commission has a full-fledged Directorate of Assets Forfeiture and Recovery Management, which remit such matters reside". "For the avoidance of doubt, the disposal of finally forfeited trucks in the Port Harcourt Zonal Office through public auction, was conducted after the exit of Bawa as Zonal Head", it said. The EFCC maintained that it was illogical for him to have been indicted over an auction that was not superintended by him.

== Cases investigated ==
During his services as the EFCC zonal head of Portharcourt Zonal Office and Lagos Zonal Office, he has successfully investigated and testified in prosecution of many cases leading to convictions and recovery of looted funds. He headed the investigations of Mrs. Diezani Allison-Madueke from 2015 to 2019 that led to the recovery of millions of dollars and properties.

His rise to national prominence in 2021 came as a result of his appointment as the Chairman of Nigeria's EFCC and was listed in the same year among Nigeria's Under 50 Leaders in Public Service, alongside other government appointees including Ahmad Salihijo Ahmad of the Rural Electrification Agency, Hadiza Bala Usman of the Nigerian Ports Authority, Elijah Onyeagba, Nigeria's ambassador to the republic of Burundi, Aishah Ahmad, Deputy Governor Financial System Stability of the Central Bank of Nigeria (CBN), Dr Sanusi Ohiare of the Rural Electrification Fund (REF), Ahmad Rufai Zakari Special Adviser to the President on Infrastructure, Mrs Yewande Sadiku of Nigeria Investment Promotion Commission and 3 others under the age of 50 years.

== Contempt of court ==
On 8 November 2022, a federal high court in Abuja ordered him to be remanded for contempt for the EFCC's noncompliance with a court order issued on 21 November 2018.

== Transformation of EFCC under Bawa ==
Under the Leadership of Bawa, EFCC undergone wide ranging Institutional reforms which include:

1) development of twenty-six (26) Standard Operating Procedures and twenty-five (25) Policies and Manuals for the Departments, Units, and Staff of the Commission, 2) Establishment of two new Directorates, Intelligence and Procurement 3) Setting up of Tactical Operating Centre (TOC) in the Lagos Zonal Office 4) Setting up of Cyber Laboratory domiciled in the newly created Intelligence Department. 5)The launched of a mobile application designed to ease the process of reporting economic and financial crimes in the country called the Eagle Eye. Other measures introduced by Bawa include development of policies on Document Classification, Healthcare, Sexual Harassment and Bullying, Staff Welfare, Training, Communication, New Staff Ranking, Use of Firearms and Retirement among others. The renovation, upgrade and furnishing of the commission's training institution, EFCC Academy, Karu, Abuja as well as renovation of the Abuja, Benin, Gombe, Sokoto, Lagos, Port Harcourt Headquarters Complex and Uyo Zonal Offices were among the major strides of EFCC under Bawa. These were instrumental to the success of EFCC which led the Commission secured a total of 3785 (Three Thousand Seven Hundred and Eighty-five) convictions across all its Commands in 2022. The figure, which emerged from a review of the Commission’s performance in 2022, shows a 70.5% improvement over its record for 2021 and 2020. It also represents a 98.93% success rate in prosecution given that the Commission lost only 41 cases, representing 1.07% within the period.
