= Aliyu =

- Gender: Male
- Languages: Hausa, Yoruba

Origin
- Origin: Nigerian
- Meaning: to be exalted high.
- Region of origin: Southwestern and Northern region

pronunciation

Aliyu is a Nigerian male given name and surname predominantly used among Muslims, particularly within the Yoruba and Hausa communities. Derived from Arabic, "Ali", meaning "to be exalted high." related to the Hebrew name Eli. The diminutive form, as well as the dialectal variation is Àlíù.

== Given name ==
- Aliyu Abubakar, Nigerian politician
- Aliyu Abubakar (footballer) (born 1996), Nigerian footballer
- Aliyu Attah, Nigerian police officer
- Aliyu Babba (died 1926), Emir of Kano
- Aliyu Bawa (born 1991), Nigerian footballer
- Aliyu Doma (born 1942), Nigerian politician
- Aliyu Ibrahim, Nigerian footballer
- Aliyu Kama (born 1949), Nigerian general
- Aliyu Mohammed Gusau (born 1943), Nigerian Army officer
- Aliyu Mai-Bornu (1919–1970), Nigerian economist
- Aliyu Musa (born 1957), Nigerian politician
- Aliyu Obaje (1920–2012), Nigerian traditional ruler
- Aliyu Okechukwu (born 1995), Nigerian footballer
- Aliyu Modibbo Umar (born 1958), Nigerian politician
- Aliyu Magatakarda Wamakko (born 1953), Nigerian politician
- Aliyu Sani Madaki (born 1967), Nigerian politician

== Surname ==
- Abdullahi Aliyu, Nigerian civil servant
- Akilu Aliyu (1918–1999), Nigerian poet, writer, scholar and politician
- Dabo Aliyu (born 1947), Nigerian politician
- Hadiza Aliyu (born 1989), Nigerian actress
- Ibrahim Aliyu, Nigerian general
- Jummai Babangida Aliyu, Nigerian humanitarian
- Mohammed Goyi Aliyu (born 1993), Nigerian footballer
- Mu'azu Babangida Aliyu (born 1955), Nigerian politician
- Nasiru Aliyu (born 1990), Nigerian footballer
