= Ahmad Salihijo Ahmad =

Nigerian engineer, renewable energy advocate and politician (born 1983)

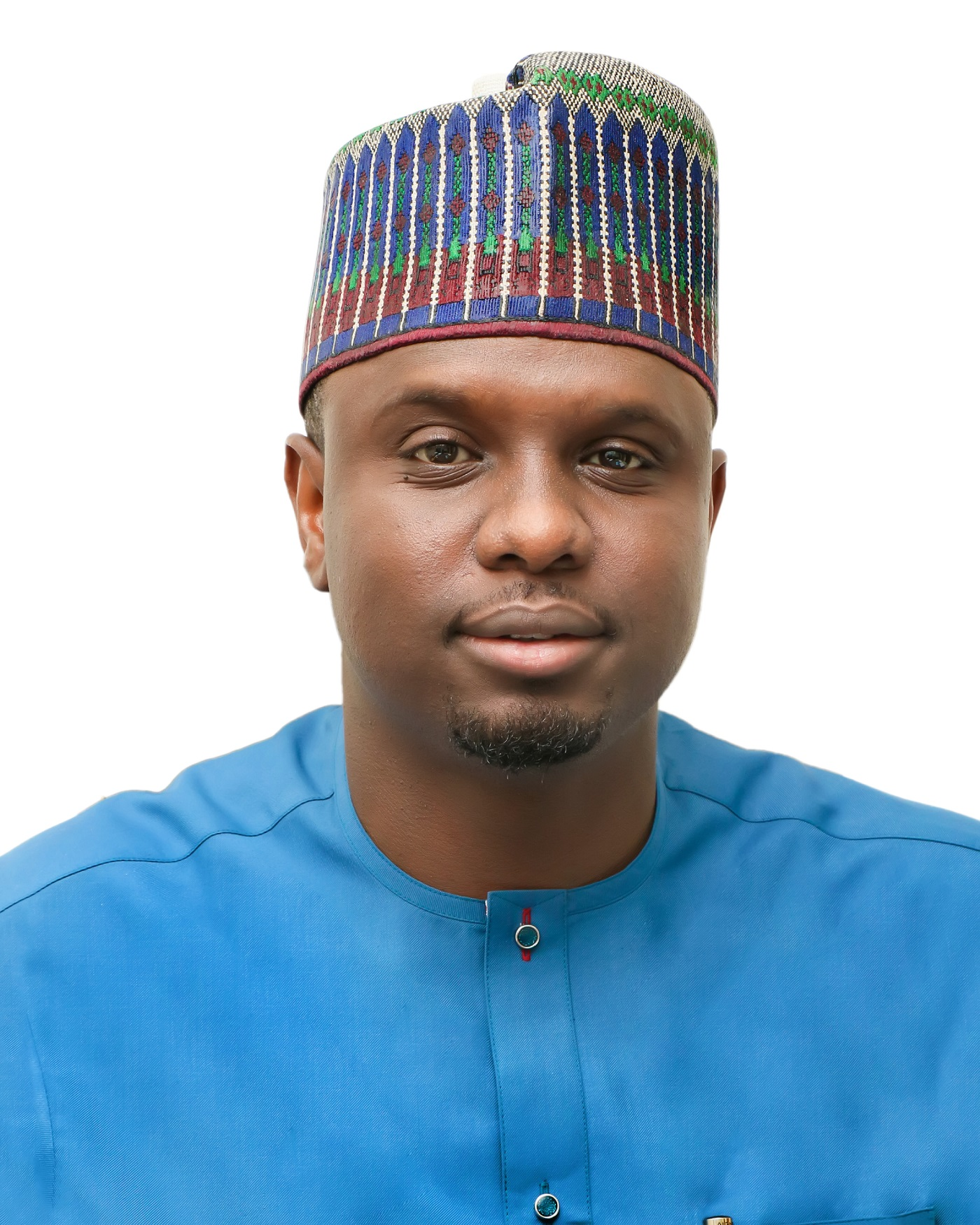
- Born: 20 October 1983 (age 43); Jimeta, Yola North, Adamawa State, Nigeria
- Education: University of Leeds (BEng); Nigerian Defence Academy (MDS)
- Occupations: Engineer, renewable energy consultant, politician
- Years active: 2006–present
- Employer(s): Rural Electrification Agency (2019–2024); AMSAL Consults (2025–present)
- Known for: Rural electrification and renewable energy development in Nigeria
- Title: Managing Director/CEO of the Rural Electrification Agency (2019–2024)
- Political party: All Progressives Congress (APC)
- Website: ahmadsalihijo.com

Ahmad Salihijo Ahmad (born 20 October 1983) is a Nigerian electrical engineer, renewable energy executive, and politician. He served as the Managing Director and Chief Executive Officer of Nigeria's Rural Electrification Agency (REA) from December 2019 to March 2024. Since May 2025, he has served as Managing Partner at the infrastructure and climate-finance advisory firm AMSAL Consults. In May 2026, he emerged as the All Progressives Congress (APC) candidate for the Yola North/Yola South/Girei Federal Constituency in Adamawa State ahead of the 2027 Nigerian House of Representatives election.

== Early life and family ==
Ahmad Salihijo Ahmad was born on 20 October 1983 at the General Hospital (now Specialist Hospital) in Jimeta, Yola North, Adamawa State, into the family of the late Ahmad Salihijo from Adamawa State, who was a prominent development planner and lead consultant to the Petroleum Trust Fund (PTF) through Afri-Projects Consortium. He is the eldest son of Ahmad Salihijo and traces his paternal lineage across Yola South (through his great-grandfather Modibbo Ahmadu Ganye), Yola North, and Girei.

== Education ==
Ahmad attended Essence International School in Kaduna and the British Secondary School of Lomé in Togo before proceeding to the University of Leeds in the United Kingdom, where he graduated with a Bachelor of Engineering (BEng) degree in Electronic and Electrical Engineering in 2006. He later earned a master's qualification in Project Planning and Management from CADD Centre in Abuja in 2008 and a Master of Development Studies from the Nigerian Defence Academy in Kaduna in 2018.

== Career ==
=== Early career ===
Between 2009 and 2012, Ahmad worked at Nigeria's Infrastructure Concession Regulatory Commission (ICRC), serving as a Senior Infrastructure Officer and later Principal Infrastructure Officer evaluating public-private partnership (PPP) business cases, including the Kuje Water Works, the National Theatre redevelopment, and Katampe District infrastructure. At the Subsidy Reinvestment and Empowerment Programme (SURE-P), he helped design the Graduate Internship Scheme, which placed over 50,000 Nigerian graduates into internships, and coordinated youth employment initiatives under the Community Services Scheme.

He subsequently served as Special Adviser to the Minister of Environment, Amina J. Mohammed, at the Federal Ministry of Environment, where he was a focal person on the Great Green Wall project and the Ogoni Clean-Up. During his time at the ministry, he coordinated the Nigerian Green Bond Programme Secretariat, participating in the issuance of Africa's first Sovereign Green Bond valued at ₦10.69 billion, which financed climate-smart infrastructure including a 7.1 MW solar hybrid power plant at Bayero University Kano. He later served as Executive Director of Operations at eN Consulting and Projects Limited, where he worked on the origination and licensing of two 50 MW grid-connected solar photovoltaic power plants and greenfield hydropower concessions in Benue and Taraba states.

=== Rural Electrification Agency (2019–2024) ===
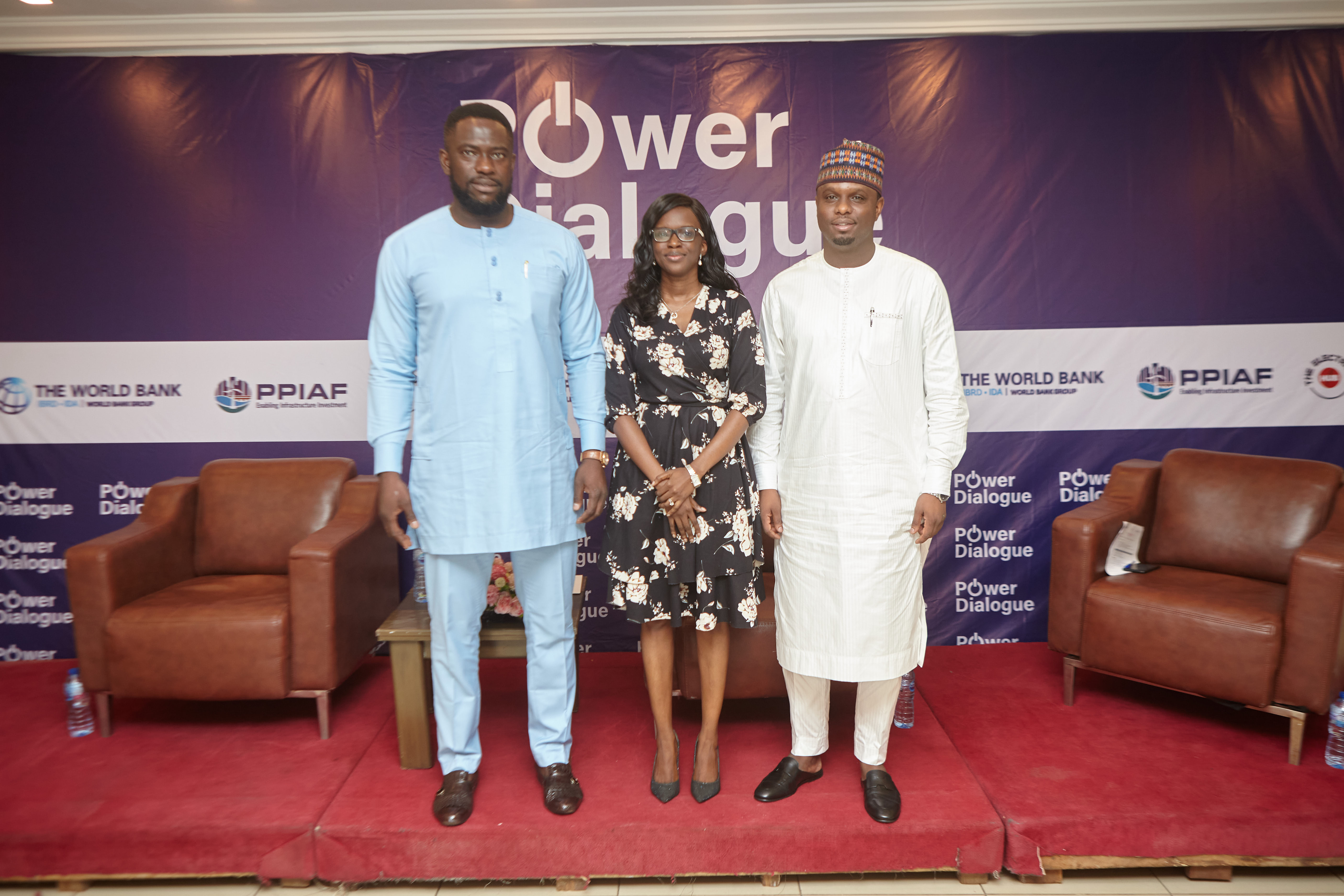
[L–R] Alexander Obiechina, Abigail Jibril-Okonta, and Ahmad Salihijo Ahmad, MD/CEO of the Rural Electrification Agency, at The Electricity Hub's 71st Power Dialogue.

In December 2019, President Muhammadu Buhari appointed Ahmad as Managing Director and Chief Executive Officer of the Rural Electrification Agency (REA), succeeding Damilola Ogunbiyi following her appointment as Special Representative of the UN Secretary-General for Sustainable Energy for All.

During his first year in office, the agency expanded rural electricity access through the $550 million Nigeria Electrification Project (NEP)—jointly financed by the World Bank and the African Development Bank—delivering over 99,000 connections and solar hybrid mini-grids across states including Ebonyi, Anambra, Katsina, Osun, and Ogun. Across his four-year tenure, REA executed off-grid solar mini-grids and solar home systems under the Energizing Economies Initiative, Energizing Education Programme (covering federal universities and teaching hospitals), and Energizing Agriculture Programme, while concluding technical preparation with the World Bank for the $750 million Distributed Access through Renewable Energy Scale-Up (DARES) programme approved in December 2023.

==== 2023–2026 financial investigations and exoneration ====
In 2023, the REA came under scrutiny following internal and external audits into unauthorized withdrawals and irregular payment practices within the agency's accounts department. Prior to leaving office, Ahmad flagged unusual disbursement patterns on the Government Integrated Financial Management Information System (GIFMIS) to external authorities and initiated an internal investigation; implicated finance and accounts officers were queried and suspended, and the agency's Senior Staff Committee (SSC) recommended their dismissal to the Federal Ministry of Power.

On 7 March 2024, President Bola Tinubu suspended Ahmad and three executive directors indefinitely pending a comprehensive investigation into financial activities at the agency and appointed Abba Abubakar Aliyu in an acting capacity. Separate investigations conducted between 2023 and 2026 by the Economic and Financial Crimes Commission (EFCC) and the Independent Corrupt Practices Commission (ICPC) subsequently determined that the disputed disbursements were processed by officials in the finance, accounts, and human resources departments without mandatory internal audit clearance and without the approval of Ahmad or Executive Director of Technical Services Barka Sajou.

Between June 2024 and May 2025, the EFCC and ICPC arraigned several former REA finance, human resources, and corporate services officials before the Federal High Court and FCT High Court in Abuja, securing remand and interim asset forfeiture orders against two former directors of finance and accounts and other personnel. Neither Ahmad nor Sajou was charged or listed as a defendant in any of the prosecutions arising from the investigations.

=== Post-REA career and politics ===
After leaving the REA, Ahmad became Managing Partner at AMSAL Consults, an infrastructure market-readiness and climate-finance advisory firm based in Abuja.

In April 2026, Ahmad formally declared his candidacy for the House of Representatives seat representing Yola North, Yola South, and Girei Federal Constituency in Adamawa State on the platform of the All Progressives Congress (APC). In May 2026, he won the APC primary election to become the party's candidate for the constituency in the 2027 general election, and subsequently inaugurated his campaign directorate in Yola in July 2026.

== Philanthropy and community impact ==
Ahmad is the founder and former chairman of the FlexiSAF Foundation, a non-profit organization focused on improving educational access for underprivileged and out-of-school (Almajiri) children in Northern Nigeria. In 2019, he led the establishment of an Accelerated Learning Programme (ACCLEARN) school in Rugga Village, Wuye, Abuja, for out-of-school children. He holds the traditional title of Kainuwa Adamawa.

== Recognition ==
In April 2021, Ahmad was listed by Blueprint among Nigeria's "Under 50 Leaders in Public Service" alongside REA Executive Director Sanusi Ohiare, Hadiza Bala Usman, Aishah Ahmad, Abdulrasheed Bawa, and Yewande Sadiku. In April 2026, he received the Award for Transformational Leadership in Energy and Nation-Building from the Coalition for a Better Adamawa (CBA) and the Public Speakers Network of Africa (PSNA).
