= Farida Waziri =

Nigerian technocrat and law enforcement officer (born 1949)

Farida Mzamber Waziri

Chairman of the EFCC
- In office May 2008 – 23 November 2011
- Preceded by: Nuhu Ribadu
- Succeeded by: Ibrahim Lamorde

Personal details
- Born: 7 July 1949 (age 77) Gboko, Benue, Nigeria
- Education: University of Lagos
- Occupation: Police officer; lawyer

Farida Mzamber Waziri (born 7 July 1949) is a Nigerian technocrat, law enforcement officer and former chairperson of the Nigerian Economic and Financial Crimes Commission (EFCC). She succeeded Nuhu Ribadu in this post.

== Background ==
Waziri was born on 7 July 1949 and raised in Gboko, Benue State. She obtained a law degree from the University of Lagos and obtained a master's degree in Law from the Lagos State University. In 1996, she gained a master's degree in Strategic Studies from the University of Ibadan. She is the author of Advance Fee Fraud, National Security and the Law.

== Police career ==
Waziri enlisted in the Nigeria Police Force in 1965 and rose to the position of Assistant Inspector General of Police. She held the positions of Assistant Commissioner of Police (Operations), screening and selection, Assistant/Deputy Commissioner of Police Force C.I.D Alagbon, Lagos, Commissioner of Police, General Investigation and Commissioner of Police in charge of X-Squad. In this last position she was responsible for handling cases of bribery and corruption within the police force. She also served as Commissioner of Police (special fraud unit) in which role she recorded the first conviction for Advance Fee Fraud in Nigeria.

She led the West African delegation on Advance Fee Fraud to Lyon, France in 1996. She led the Nigeria delegation to Dallas, Texas for a seminar organised by the United States Secret Service in 1998.

== Personal life ==
She was married to Senator Ajuji Waziri, a former Ambassador to Turkey who passed on in 2017.

== EFCC chairman ==
When being screened for the EFCC job by the Senate committee on anti-corruption, she denied that she had stood as surety for the former Benue State governor, Senator George Akume when he was charged with corruption.

She was confirmed by President Umaru Yar'Adua as EFCC chairman in May 2008, but refused to accept the position until she had also been confirmed by the Senate.

The appointment to this sensitive position was controversial.

Shortly after her appointment, Waziri inspected the EFCC detention facilities to ascertain the conditions of suspects.

In September 2008, Waziri said that allegations of corruption by former president Olusegun Obasanjo and some former state governors could not be supported because the files did not exist or they had disappeared.

In August 2008, the EFCC arrested former National Deputy Chairman of the PDP Bode George in Lagos and arraigned him and four others on a 163 count-charge of conspiracy, disobedience to lawful order, abuse of office and alleged illegal award of contracts worth N84 billion while he was chairman of the NPA.

In October 2009, Bode George was found guilty and sentenced to jail for 30 months.

In April 2009 Waziri said that the EFCC was making arrangements to extradite former Minister of the Federal Capital Territory Mallam Nasir El-Rufai from the US to face charges. She also said the President had approved the return to the Nigeria Police Force of insurance benefits that were part of the N17 billion recovered from the former Inspector General of Police Mustafa Adebayo Balogun, although Alhaji Tafa Balogun was seeking the return of these assets. She said were 200 pending cases for corruption, money laundering, fraud, illegal oil bunkering and pipeline vandalism.

In June 2009, speaking at a press conference to mark her first year in office, Farida Waziri said the EFCC was continuing its efforts to prosecute former governors including Dr. Peter Odili of Rivers State, Senator Bola Tinubu of Lagos State, Ayo Fayose of Ekiti State, Joshua Dariye of Plateau State, Saminu Turaki of Jigawa State, Jolly Nyame of Taraba State and Michael Botmang of Plateau State. Other high-level suspects being pursued included Senator Nicholas Ugbane and the former FCT Minister Nasir El-Rufai. She expressed frustration at court delays in these cases. She also said she would start to crack down on property ownership cases in Abuja.

In May 2009 there were reports of a power struggle with EFCC Director of Operations, Mr. Tunde Ogunshaki, who had been sacked by Waziri, apparently involving James Ibori, the Nigerian Attorney General, Mike Aondoakaa and the Inspector General of Police Mike Mbama Okiro.

Also in May, the EFCC took into custody in connection with the N6 billion rural electrification contract scam Senate Committee chairman on Power, Senator Nicholas Ugbane, Permanent Secretary, Ministry of Power, Alhaji Abdullahi Aliyu and others.

Later that year, the Economic and Financial Crimes Commission gave a list to the leadership of the Nigeria Labour Congress of 56 prominent Nigerians who allegedly had between them defrauded the nation of N243 billion.

== Dismissal and later career ==
Waziri was removed from her position by President Goodluck Jonathan on 23 November 2011 and on 28 November 2011 was replaced by Ibrahim Lamorde as acting chairman. Her dismissal may have been related to accusations that the EFCC had been selective in its investigations, or to her falling out with the Attorney-General and Minister of Justice, Mohammed Bello Adoke over the prosecution of cases that were brought before the court. It was also alleged that Waziri might have compromised the investigation into financial misappropriation against the former governor of Bayelsa state, Timipreye Sylva.

In some cases, as with a case against former Edo State governor Lucky Igbinedion, the court imposed negligible penalties. However, the EFCC may have opened the door by agreeing to accept a plea bargain.

After leaving office, there were reports that Waziri was considering writing a book about her experience at the EFCC.
