= Ibrahim Lamorde =

Nigerian police officer (1962–2024)

Ibrahim Abdullahi Lamorde

Chairman of the EFCC
- In office 23 November 2011 – 9 November 2015
- Preceded by: Farida Mzamber Waziri
- Succeeded by: Ibrahim Magu

Personal details
- Born: 20 December 1962 Mubi, Northern Region, Federation of Nigeria
- Died: 25 May 2024 (aged 61) Cairo, Egypt
- Occupation: Police Officer

Ibrahim Abdullahi Lamorde (20 December 1962 – 25 May 2024) was a Nigerian police officer who was appointed Chairman of the Economic and Financial Crimes Commission (EFCC) on 23 November 2011 after chairman Farida Waziri had been dismissed by President Goodluck Jonathan. He was confirmed as Chairman by the Senate on 15 February 2012.

== Early career ==
Lamorde was born on 20 December 1962 in Mubi, now in Adamawa State. He attended Ahmadu Bello University, Zaria, graduating with a B.A in Sociology in 1984. He joined the Nigerian police in 1986, and from 1987 to 1988 worked at the Niger State Police Command in Minna. From 1988 to 1989 he was Divisional Crime Officer in Rijau, Niger State. He then served as Police Public Relations Officer for the Niger State police from 1989 to 1993.

In 1993, Lamorde was appointed an officer of the newly created Special Fraud Unit (SFU) of the Nigeria Police, serving in the unit charged with investigated advance-fee fraud until 2002. One of Lamorde's colleagues at the SFU was Farida Waziri. While in the SFU, from 2000 to 2001 he was seconded to the United Nations Civilian Police in the Ermera District of East Timor as a Chief Investigation Officer. Lamorde was a Divisional Police Officer in Oyo State before being deployed to the police force headquarters in Abuja.

== EFCC ==
The EFCC was created in 2003, headed by Nuhu Ribadu, Lamorde was made Director of Operations after Tiyamiyu Oluwagbemiga retired as the pioneer Director of Operations and Strategy in 2006. In December 2007, Ribadu was removed from his post by president Umaru Musa Yar'Adua, ostensibly to attend a training course. Lamorde took over as Acting Chairman in January 2008, holding this position until Farida Waziri was appointed Chairperson in May 2008. He was then posted to Ningi in Bauchi State. In December 2010 Lamorde returned to the EFCC, again as Director of Operations. He replaced Stephen Otitoju, the acting Director of Operations.

When Farida Waziri was dismissed on 23 November 2011, Assistant Commissioner of Police (ACP) Lamorde was again appointed Acting Chairman. A number of other senior police officers were said to be competing for the position of EFCC Chairman. Lamorde's association with Waziri dating back to their days with the SFU could be a handicap. However, Lamorde was confirmed as substantive Chairman of the EFCC on 15 February 2012.

== Miscellaneous ==
Lamorde was a member of the Nigerian Institute of Management and the Nigerian Institute of Public Relations.

== Sacked By Buhari ==
On 9 November 2015, President Buhari sacked Ibrahim Lamorde, replacing him with Ibrahim Magu as the new EFCC chairman.

== Death ==
Lamorde died in the Egyptian capital, Cairo, where he had been receiving medical treatment, on 25 May 2024, at the age of 61.
