= 1991 Kebbi State gubernatorial election =

1991 gubernatorial election in Kebbi State, Nigeria

Kebbi gubernatorial election
- December 14, 1991
Nominee	Abubakar Musa	Abubakar Koko
Party	NRC	SDP
Running mate		Abdullahi Abubakar Argungu
Popular vote	296,961	102,543
Elected Governor
Abubakar Musa
NRC

The 1991 Kebbi State gubernatorial election occurred on December 14, 1991. NRC candidate Abubakar Musa won the election, defeating SDP Abubakar Koko.

== Conduct ==
The gubernatorial election was conducted using an open ballot system. Primaries for the two parties to select their flag bearers were conducted on October 19, 1991.

The election occurred on December 14, 1991. NRC candidate Abubakar Musa won the election, defeating SDP Abubakar Koko. Abubakar Musa polled 296,961 votes, while Abubakar Koko polled 102,543 votes.
