= Chairman of the EFCC =

The chairman of the EFCC is the head of the Economic and Financial Crimes Commission (EFCC), the main law enforcement and anti-graft agency in the Federal Republic of Nigeria. The Chairman of the EFCC is appointed by the President of Nigeria.

== List of chairmen ==
Photo	Chairman	Term Start	Term End	President of Nigeria
	Nuhu Ribadu	2003	December 2007	Olusegun Obasanjo Umaru Musa Yar'Adua
	Farida Mzamber Waziri	June 6, 2008	23 November 2011	Umaru Musa Yar'Adua Goodluck Jonathan
	Ibrahim Lamorde	23 November 2011	9 November 2015	Goodluck Jonathan Muhammadu Buhari
	Ibrahim Magu	9 November 2015	7 July 2020	Muhammadu Buhari
	Mohammed Umar Abba	9 July 2020	16 February 2021	Muhammadu Buhari
	Abdulrasheed Bawa	16 February 2021	14 June 2023	Muhammadu Buhari Bola Tinubu
	Olanipekun Olukayode	12 October 2023	Present	Bola Tinubu

== See also ==
- Inspector General of Police (Nigeria)
- Chief of Defence Staff (Nigeria)
