= Peoples Gazette =

Nigerian online English newspaper

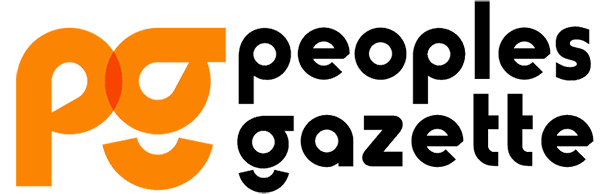
- Peoples Gazette logo
- Type: Online newspaper
- Publisher: Peoples Gazette Limited
- Managing editor: Samuel Ogundipe
- Founded: 2020
- Language: English
- Headquarters: Abuja, Nigeria
- ISSN: 2736-0156
- Website: peoplesgazette.com

Peoples Gazette is a Nigerian online newspaper based in Abuja. It launched in 2020. The online medium is notable for its investigative journalism, among other fields.

== Launching ==
Peoples Gazette was launched in 2020 by Samuel Ogundipe, an investigative journalist who was arrested and detained by the Nigerian government for reporting undesirable stories about the Muhammadu Buhari administration. He left Premium Times in 2020 to start his own paper. In one week of its launch, it reported groundbreaking exclusive reports that became issues of national discussion.

== Attacks and censorship ==
On 26 January 2021, the newspaper had its website blocked across all telecommunication networks in Nigeria; this blockage, Peoples Gazette stated, was based on a directive from the Nigerian government as a result of an unfavourable publication it wrote indicting the Chief of Staff to President Muhammadu Buhari, Ibrahim Gambari, of delegating his son to take over the duty of his office even without security clearance to do so.

A forensic analysis conducted by Qurium Media Foundation in Sweden indicated that users in Nigeria were unable to access the domain of the newspaper because access to it was tampered with by telecommunication networks.

The Committee to Protect Journalists and Reporters Without Borders condemned the clampdown on Peoples Gazette describing it as an obstruction of citizens' right to information and press freedom.

On 10 January 2022, Peoples Gazette reported it had been raided by National Intelligence Agency forces demanding Peoples Gazette reveal the identities of certain government officers who had leaked information related to Ahmed Rufai Abubakar to the newspaper.

== Major breaking reports ==
Following the mass protest across Nigeria against police brutality in October 2020, named EndSARS, which led to the Lekki Massacre, the paper was the first to report the disbandment of the brutal police unit known as SARS, four hours before the announcement was officially made. The paper also exclusively reported the decision of the Nigerian government to clamp down on individuals who participated in the EndSARS protest by freezing their bank accounts through the Central Bank of Nigeria.

In March 2021, the paper reported exclusively on the move by the Economic and Financial Crimes Commission to investigate the former governor of Lagos State and National Leader of the ruling All Progressive Congress, Bola Tinubu, by writing to the Code of Conduct Bureau to demand for his asset declaration file which he submitted as governor of Lagos state. The report generated a nationwide discussion on attempts by some individuals within the Nigerian Presidency to entrap Bola Tinubu in other to ensure he doesn't contest for the 2023 presidential election.

The platform also broke the story of the Code of Conduct investigation of the sacked Chairman of the Economic and Financial Crimes Commission Ibrahim Magu

In April 2021, the platform published video, audio and transcripts of the preaching of Nigeria's Minister for Communications and Digital Economy Isa Ali Pantami, also known as Isa Pantami. In the publication series, the minister pronounced his support for terrorist organisations such as Taliban and Al-Qaeda saying “Oh God, give victory to the Taliban and to al-Qaeda". Pantami called for all Muslim brothers in the country to embark on jihad saying "jihad is an obligation for every single believer, especially in Nigeria" while expressing joy when unbelievers are killed saying “We are all happy whenever unbelievers are being killed, but the Sharia does not allow us to kill them without a reason.”

The publications birthed the call by thousands of Nigerians on Twitter for the dismissal or resignation of the minister.

The platform reported exclusively the robbery by armed individuals at the presidential villa in Aso Rock where the residences of the Chief of Staff to the President, Ibrahim Gambari, as well as that of the Administration Officer in the Presidency, Abubakar Maikano, were robbed. The report was later confirmed by the spokesman to President Buhari, Garba Shehu.

The Gazette was the first media platform to report the death of the founder of The Synagogue, Church Of All Nations (SCOAN), Prophet T. B. Joshua on Saturday 5 June 2021. The report cited family sources who disclosed that the referend preacher died after the weekend service. The report was initially dismissed by a close ally of the pastor and former minister for aviation Femi Fani-Kayode, who disclosed that he called the preacher's daughter and she was unaware. Fani-Kayode would later walk back his dismissal when he confirmed the story five hours later.

== Corruption report series ==
The Gazette has reported series of exclusive reports that involve powerful political players in Nigeria. Through the publication of bank records, the platform reported a ring of financial misappropriation and corruption in the Government of Lagos State which leads to the former governor of the state, Bola Tinubu alongside his companies TVC News and The Nation and family members through shell companies. The platform also reported bank records of payment made by Africa's richest man Aliko Dangote to Hadiza Bala Usman a chieftain of the All Progressive Congress, co-founder of the campaign for the release of the Chibok schoolgirls kidnapping Bring Back Our Girls movement and erstwhile managing director of the Nigerian Ports Authority during the 2015 presidential election. Dangote paid Bala Usman the sum of 200 million naira in two tranches of 100 million naira each.

The platform also reported through bank records, how the former governor of Ogun State and Senator, Ibikunle Amosun withdrew public funds directly from the state coffer and also making a direct payment to the account of President Muhammadu Buhari. The Governor of Ebonyi State Dave Umahi was also reported to have awarded state contracts to companies he has an interest in. The governor threatened to sue the media platform.

In another report, The Gazette detailed how an ally of President Muhammadu Buhari Ismaila Isa Funtua received via his company Bulet International Nigeria Limited the sum of 840million naira from the Federal Inland Revenue Service in four transactions between March and June 2019.

== Nigeria's National Intelligence Agency attack ==
On January 10, 2021, four operatives of the Nigerian secret intelligence service National Intelligence Agency (Nigeria) raided the head office of Peoples Gazette newspaper in Abuja, demanding that the paper reveal sources to a letter written by some of its senior officers to the president alleging that the director-general Ahmed Rufai Abubakar was not qualified to hold the position. A letter demanding that the newspaper cooperate or the agency activate other options was signed by Armstrong Machunga on behalf of the director-general and submitted by the operatives.

In reaction to the raid and threat, the Committee to Protect Journalists stated that “Nigerian intelligence’s brazen efforts to identify sources for Peoples Gazette’s reporting fit a pattern of disrespect for journalists’ rights to protect those that give them information. Source protection is a critical condition for press freedom, and Nigerian authorities should stop trying to force journalists to disclose their sources.” In a similar reaction, Reporters Without Borders described the action of the NIA as extremely dangerous. "We strongly condemn the pressure being placed on this media outlet, which violates the most basic rights of journalists. For an intelligence agency to conduct a raid on a news organisation in order to identify a source with the sole aim of protecting its own interests is extremely dangerous. We call on the authorities to end their harassment of this site, which is constantly subjected to pressure and threats because of the quality of its reporting and the serious subjects it addresses.”

== Police Raid ==
On July 22, 2022, armed policemen clamped down on the headquarters of Peoples Gazette, arresting an editor of the newspaper alongside two journalists and two administrative staff. Five policemen took part in the raid and arrests in an operation that lasted over 30 minutes. The police officers demanded to see the managing editor and a reporter on a story published by the newspaper on June 23 chronicling how the nation's anti-graft agency recovered cash and luxury items from the home of the former chief of army staff Tukur Yusuf Buratai.

The raid was criticised by Amnesty International, Committee to Protect Journalists, amongst many others.

== Awards and nominations ==
In April 2021, One World Media longlisted Peoples Gazette for the Special Award, an award category that recognises outstanding reporting that informs the public, provides an outlet for local people's voices, creates a space for critical information, and holds those in power to account.

The newspaper became the third of any Nigerian newspaper to be so nominated by the U.K based non-profit organisation.
