= Mohammed Bello-Koko =

Nigerian banker (born 1969)

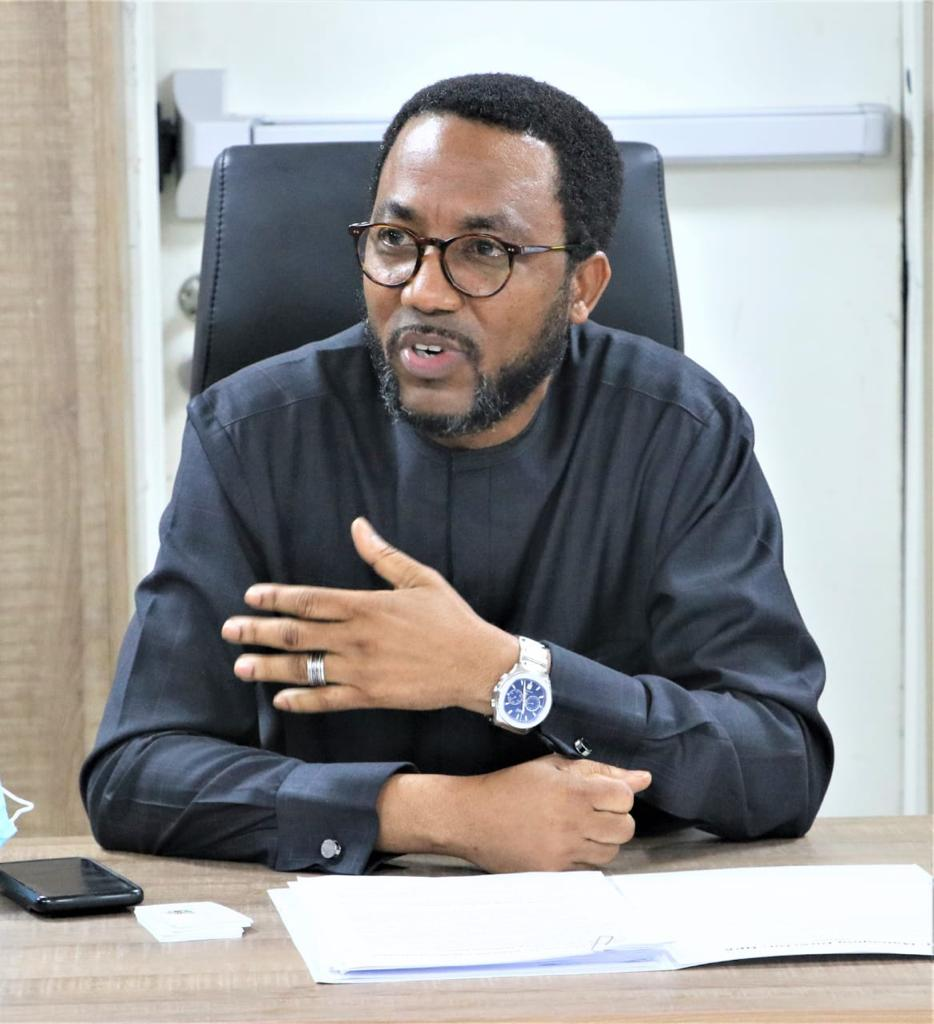
- Bello-Koko on duty at the Nigerian Ports Authority, Lagos in 2022

Managing Director of Nigerian Ports Authority
- In office 6 May 2021 – 12 July 2024
- Preceded by: Hadiza Bala Usman
- Succeeded by: Dr Abubakar Dantsoho

Personal details
- Born: 25 March 1969 (age 57) Koko-Besse, North-Western State, Nigeria (now in Kebbi State)
- Spouse: Agatha Anne Koko
- Education: Usman Danfodio University; Harvard Kennedy School
- Occupation: Banker

Mohammed Bello-Koko NPOM (born 25 March 1969) is a Nigerian banker and former Managing Director of the Nigerian Ports a position he assumed on 22 February 2022. Before his appointment as substantive managing director, Bello-Koko was on 6 May 2021, made the acting managing director of NPA when Hadiza Bala Usman was directed to handover to the most senior executive director after she was suspended for insubordination. Prior to the appointment as acting MD, Bello-Koko was the executive director, Finance & Administration of the Authority.

== Early life and education ==
Mohammed Bello-Koko was born on 25 March 1969, in Koko/Besse local government area in Kebbi State. He attended and completed his secondary school education at the Federal Government College Sokoto in 1986. He then proceeded to the Usmanu Danfodio University, Sokoto for his bachelor of science (B.Sc.) degree in Management Studies and Master’s degree in Business Administration (MBA) in 1992 and 1995 respectively. He earned Executive Certificate in Public Leadership at Harvard Kennedy School.

Bello-Koko is a Fellow of the Association of National Accountants of Nigeria (ANAN) and the Institute of Strategies Management (ISMN) and a member of Nigerian Institute of Management (NIM).

== Career ==
Bello Koko started his career with FSB International Bank Plc from the year 1996 to 2004 and functioned across several strategic portfolios including Banking operations, Credit-Risk Management, Treasury Operations, Retail banking and Corporate Marketing that found him in charge of Energy sector and Public Sector, thus responsible for managing accounts of several multinational oil and Gas companies, Public sector relationships.

He joined Zenith International Bank Plc in the year 2005 where he grew at various times to be Branch ahead, zonal Head Public Sector and also Large Corporates from where his contribution to the bank’s globally referenced profitability and balance sheet in the period 2005 to 2015 earned him awards in the bank and a spot in the bank’s Executive Management Team as Deputy General Manager and Zonal Head.

=== Nigerian Ports Authority ===
In the year 2016, Bello-Koko was appointed by President Muhammadu Buhari as Executive Director Finance and Administration of the Nigerian Ports Authority (NPA), a role he held with distinction till May 2021, when he was appointed Acting Managing Director.

His sterling performance as acting Managing Director evidenced by plugging of income leakages, unprecedented growth in revenue and improved operational efficiencies that led to significant increase in container traffic to Onne Port and the demonstrated resolve to open up the Eastern Ports of Warri, Calabar and Rivers convinced President Muhammadu Buhari to confirm Koko as Managing Director of the NPA on 15 February 2022.

As Managing Director of the Port Authority, Bello Koko revealed that measures and investments are being undertaken to create a fully digital ecosystem in port locations across Nigeria by 2025.

During his term in office, the NPA received “Platinum Level” certification from Bureau of Public Service Reforms (BPSR) for reducing export processing time and plugging revenue leakages.

== Awards and honours ==
He was awarded Champion Newspapers Maritime Icon of the Year Award 2022 for “fast tracking operationalisation of Nigeria’s first deep seaport, unprecedented revenue generation and remittances to consolidated revenue fund”. Same year, he won the Best Maritime Agency Award (2022) presented by New Telegraph and Public Sector Icon of the Year (2022) awarded by Vanguard

Bello-Koko won the National Productivity Order of Merit (NPOM) Award (2022) for his reforms in the NPA; improved trade facilitation and revenue generation and was honoured with African Ports Administrative Excellence Award (2023) by African Leadership Magazine based in the UK for “immense contribution to innovation, creativity, invention and productivity in the Nigerian Maritime sector.”

In 2024, he received the World Customs Organisation, WCO Merit Award (2024) for ‘rendering exceptional services to the international Customs community’ and was named best performing CEO on ease of doing business by the Presidential Enabling Business Environment Council, PEBEC in June 2024.

== Personal life ==
Mohammed Bello-Koko is married to Agatha Anne Koko, an entrepreneur. He is a nephew of the late Sarkin Yakin Gwandu Alhaji Abubakar Koko

== Recognition ==
As acting Director, Bello-Koko was a recipient of the 2021 Visionary Leadership Award from Renner and Renner Consulting.
