= Fredrick Nwabufo =

Nigerian journalist and media entrepreneur

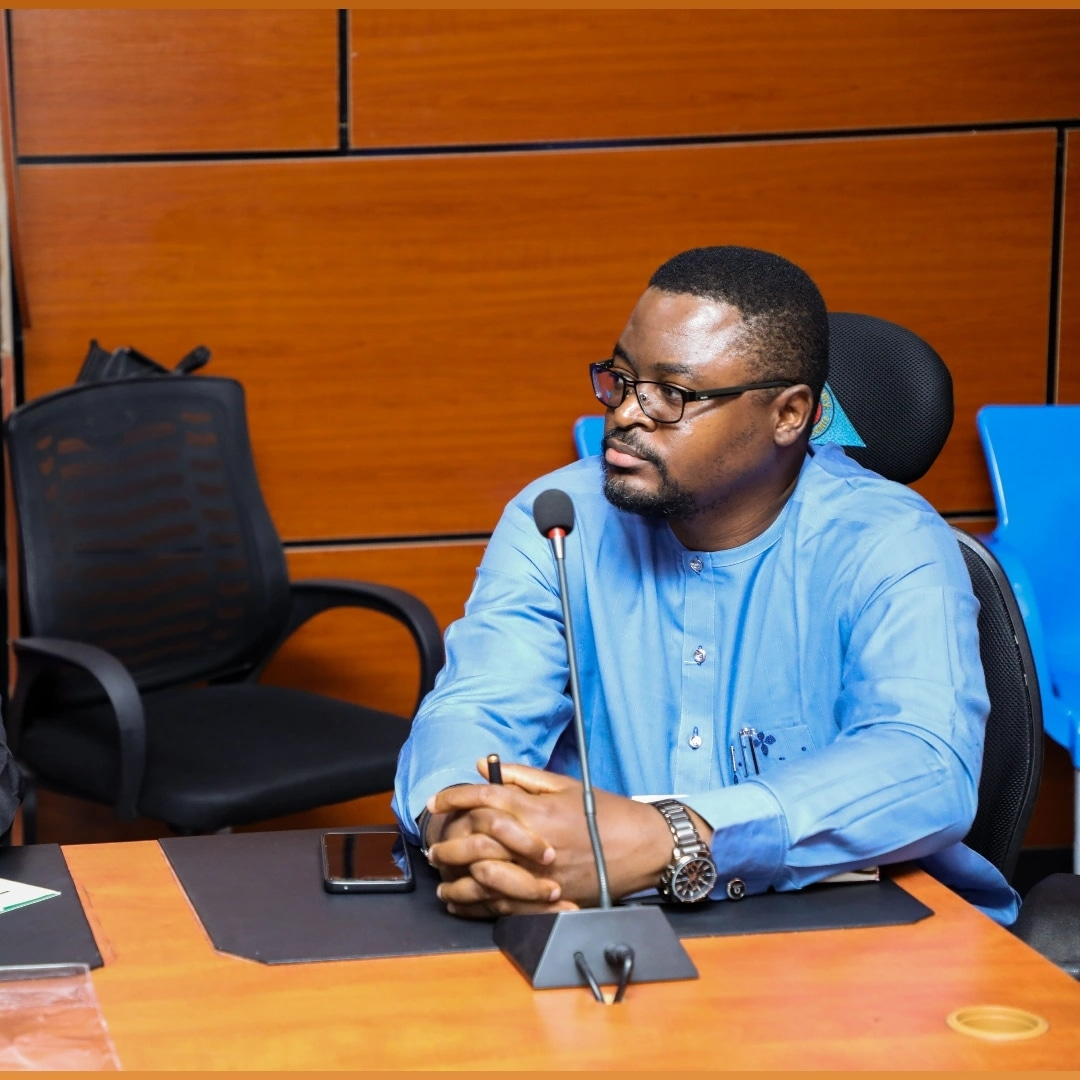
- Fredrick Nwabufo in 2024
- Born: Lagos
- Occupations: Nigerian Journalist and Media Entrepreneurs
- Website: https://www.fredricknwabufo.com/

Fredrick Nwabufo is a Nigerian journalist and media entrepreneur currently serving as Senior Special Assistant on Public Engagement to President Tinubu. He is a columnist with Cable News Paper Limited, Leadership Newspaper, The Nation Newspaper, peoples Gazette Nigeria and other national newspapers where he discusses issues on governance, politics and national security. Nwabufo is the convener of Journalists For United Nigeria (JUN), an ideological and voluntary group for journalists committed to peace-building, national cohesion and progress. He is also the Publisher of the Link News Newspaper.

== Early life ==
Nwabufo was born and raised in Lagos State and hails Idemili North Local Government Area of Anambra state, Nigeria.

== Journalism career ==
Nwabufo joined TheCable Newspaper as deputy editor in 2014. He was made the online news platform's Abuja bureau chief in 2016. In September 2022, Fredrick Nwabufo launched TheLinkng, an online newspaper.
