= Olanipekun Olukayode =

Nigerian lawyer

Olanipekun Olukoyede

Chairman of the EFCC
- Incumbent
- Assumed office 12 October 2023
- President: Bola Tinubu
- Preceded by: Abdulrasheed Bawa

Personal details
- Born: 14 October 1969 (age 57) Ikere, Western State, Nigeria
- Education: Harvard University; Lagos State University; University of Lagos
- Occupation: Civil servant

Olanipekun Olukoyede (born 14 October 1969) also known as Ola is the Chairman of the Economic and Financial Crimes Commission (EFCC). He was appointed by President Bola Ahmed Tinubu on 12 October 2023.

== Education and early life ==
Olanipekun was born on 14 October 1969, in Ikere-Ekiti. He serves as a pastor in the City of Refuge, Lagos Province 12, Shasha, Lagos State, of the Redeemed Christian Church of God. Ola attended Harvard University for the Kennedy School of Executive Education, as well as Lagos State University, University of Lagos, the Institute of Arbitration in the International Chamber of Commerce (ICC) in Paris, France, and the Institute of Arbitration in Lagos.

== Career ==
Prior to Olanipekun's involvement and appointment as the Executive Chairman of the EFCC, he worked as a lawyer at a law firm owned by former Vice President of Nigeria, Yemi Osinbajo. He served as the Chief of Staff to the Executive Chairman (2016–2018) and Secretary to the Commission (2018–2021). He was nominated as Secretary to the EFCC in 2018 by the-then President of Nigeria, Muhammadu Buhari. The presidential spokesperson, Ajuri Ngelale, during the announcement of Olukoyede's appointment for a four-year tenure stated thus: "Olukoyede has 22 years of regulatory compliance consulting, fraud management, and business intelligence experience." Olukoyede is a member of the Fraud Advisory Panel, United Kingdom and the Federal Government Technical Committee on the Repositioning of the Nigerian Financial Intelligence Unit.
