= Ajuji Waziri =

Nigerian politician (died 2017)

Senator
- Constituency: Bauchi South East Senatorial District

Personal details
- Died: April 17, 2017
- Spouse: Farida Waziri
- Occupation: Nigerian politician, Diplomat

Ajuji Waziri (died April 17, 2017) was a Nigerian politician and diplomat. He served as a senator during the Sixth National Assembly and later held the position of Nigeria's ambassador to Turkey.

== Career ==
Waziri was elected as a senator representing the Bauchi South East Senatorial District in 1983. He also served as Nigeria’s Ambassador to the Republic of Turkey from 2004 to 2007.

== Personal life ==
Waziri was married to Farida Waziri.
