= John Ubah =

John I. Ubah

Military Administrator of Kebbi State
- In office 22 August 1996 – August 1998
- Preceded by: Salihu Tunde Bello
- Succeeded by: Samaila Bature Chamah

Personal details
- Born: 17 October Agila, Benue State, Nigeria
- Died: 8 August 2024
- Spouse: Alice Ubah
- Children: 5

Colonel John Ikwebe Paul Ubah was Administrator of Kebbi State in Nigeria from August 1996 to August 1998 during the military regime of General Sani Abacha. He was born in Okpobla, Agila, Benue State.

As Kebbi State governor, in January 1998 he threatened to sack the management of the Kebbi state radio station since it could still not be heard beyond a 10-kilometre radius.

In 2001 he was one of the former military governors who declared the formation of the United Nigeria Development Forum (UNDF), a political lobby group. John Ubah is the author of four poetry works - Songs of Lokoja, Where the Eagle Perches, Birds of Kebbi Land and Daybreak - and has contributed to several poetry anthologies.
