= Patrick Aziza =

Nigerian politician and general

Major General Patrick Aziza CFR

Governor of Kebbi State
- In office 28 August 1991 – January 1992
- Preceded by: Bashir Salihi Magashi (Sokoto State)
- Succeeded by: Abubakar Musa

Minister of Communications
- In office. – August 1998
- Succeeded by: Air Vice Marshal Cannes Umenwaliri

Minister of Commerce and Tourism
- In office 22 August 1998 – May 1999
- Succeeded by: Mustapha Bello

Personal details
- Born: 23 December 1947 Okpe, Delta State
- Died: 16 August 2014 (aged 66) Abuja, Nigeria

Military service
- Allegiance: Nigeria
- Branch/service: Nigerian Army
- Rank: Major General
- Commands: Brigade Commander, Amphibious Brigade, Calabar

Patrick Aziza (23 December 1947 – 16 August 2014) was a Nigerian military officer who served as the first military Governor of Kebbi State, Nigeria after it was split off from Sokoto State on 27 August 1991 during the military regime of General Ibrahim Babangida.

== Birth and early career ==
Aziza was born in Okpe local Government Area in Delta State on 23 December 1947. He was raised in Abakaliki, Ebonyi State. He went to Ibadan for his secondary education before joining the Army and participating in the Nigerian Civil War (1967–1970). Aziza then attended the Nigeria Defence Academy, Kaduna, graduating in 1970. He was commissioned 2nd lieutenant and promoted to lieutenant in 1970, and was posted to the 3rd Marine Commando. In 1971, he was promoted to captain. He was appointed ADC to the Chief of Army Staff, Major General David Ejoor. In 1974, he attended the Advanced School of Infantry in Fort Benning, United States for a 12-month course.

Aziza was posted to Warri as a battalion commander, then promoted and posted to Kano as brigade major. He attended the Command and Staff College, Jaji (1978–1979), and was then posted to Army Headquarters responsible for movement and planning. In this role he handled troop movement planning for the Nigerian contingent in the United Nations' operations, UNIFIL, in Lebanon. Aziza served in the Provisional Ruling Council.

== Senior army positions ==
Aziza was the Brigade Commander of the Amphibious Brigade in Calabar when he was appointed the first military administrator of Kebbi State, holding office from 28 August 1991 to January 1992, when he handed over to the elected civilian governor Abubakar Musa at the start of the aborted Nigerian Third Republic.

Aziza was a member of the group of officers that planned the coup in which General Sani Abacha took power. He was Chairman of the Special Military Tribunal that convicted Olusegun Obasanjo and Major General Shehu Musa Yar'Adua for involvement in an alleged 1995 coup plot. He was also head of a tribunal that tried six journalists for treason, based on publishing accounts of the coup. The trials were swift and the conclusion appeared to be decided in advance.

Aziza served as communications minister in the military regime of General Sani Abacha. In this role he revoked the licenses of 12 companies that had earlier been given the go-ahead to provide various telecommunications services. In March 1998, Aziza said that Nigeria was seeking six billion U.S. dollars to "meet our immediate requirements of over three million telephone lines and 200,000 cellular lines." He was appointed Minister of Commerce and Tourism during the transitional regime of General Abdulsalami Abubakar.

== Later career ==
Aziza was required by President Olusegun Obasanjo to retire from the army in June 1999 after the return to democracy with the Nigerian Fourth Republic, along with other former military administrators. In October 2000, he appeared before the Oputa panel on violation of human rights sitting in Abuja, investigating the Special Military Tribunal that sentenced Obasanjo to jail over the alleged 1995 coup. He denied ordering torture in connection with the tribunal. In July 2001, the Justice Michael Edem Commission on the Cocoa Export Levy and Cocoa Buffer Stock Funds indicted Aziza for wrongly appropriating money while Minister of Trade and Tourism.

Aziza became engaged in private business, and also a successful amateur golfer. He was given the chieftaincy title of Ajaguna of Okukuland by the Olokuku of Okuku, Osun State, also Azizokpe of Okpe by the Orodje of Okpe kingdom Delta state and was named a Commander of the Federal Republic. Until his death, he was the president General of Urhobo Progress Union (UPU) a social cultural organisation of the Urhobo people.

Aziza died of cancer on 16 August 2014 at the age of 66.
