= Mustafa Bello =

Nigerian politician

Minister of Commerce
- In office June 1999 – 2002
- Preceded by: Major-General Patrick Aziza

Personal details
- Born: January 31, 1954 (age 72) Niger State, Nigeria
- Party: PDP

Mustafa Bello (born 31 January 1954) was appointed Nigerian Minister of Commerce in the first cabinet of President Olusegun Obasanjo, holding office between June 1999 and 2002. He became head of the Nigerian Investment Promotion Commission (NIPC) in December 2003.

== Background ==
He is a cousin to the retired army officer Colonel Sani Bello. Colonel Bello is being credited for supporting Mustafa through school that was largely on the scholarship of the North-Western State of Nigeria. The support and encouragement of General Ibrahim Badamasi Babangia made it possible for him to become a Minister in 1999 as the only name forwarded to the then elected President Olusegun Obasanjo with whom he worked closely and gained lot of his confidence as "Dutiful Minister" as he described him in one of his books. Bello obtained a Bachelor of Engineering (Civil) Degree from Ahmadu Bello University, Zaria through scholarship by the then North Western State

== Minister of Commerce ==
Bello was Minister of Commerce from 1999 until a cabinet re-shuffle in early 2001. In August 2001 he said that Nigeria's huge gas resources would last for about 50 years, and could supply the continent once planned pipelines had been constructed. In March 2002 Bello urged GSM operators and other telecommunications service providers to reduce their tariffs and provide quality services for their customers. In June 2002 the Niger State government accused Bello and Information Minister Jerry Gana of being behind the June 4 attack on Governor Abdulkadir Kure. Both men denied the allegations.

Bello resigned from the government, and in December 2002 he became the candidate of the newly registered People's Redemption Party (PRP) for governor of Niger State in the 2003 Niger State gubernatorial election. He said he had left the People's Democratic Party (PDP) because it had been hijacked by the administration of Governor Abdulkadir Kure for selfish reasons. He came in second after Kure, who was reelected.

== Nigeria Investment Promotion Commission ==
Bello assumed the position of Executive Secretary and Chief Executive Officer of the Nigeria Investment Promotion Commission (NIPC) in December 2003.

In June 2005 he predicted that interest rate would fall to about 6% on completion of bank recapitalization in 2006. In July 2006 the Chinese Commercial Counselor Mr. Hu Yu Chen praised the NIPC in assisting Chinese investors, and said that in 2005 trade between Nigeria and the People's Republic of China had exceeded $2.8 billion, making Nigeria China's second largest trading partner. This was an increase from $1.45 billion 2001. In June 2007 Bello confirmed that poverty was in the increase, with half of the nation's 140 million people living below the poverty line. In August 2007 Bello said Nigeria was fast becoming a preferred destination for investors, with total foreign direct investments (FDIs) now at about $35 billion, of which China alone had invested $10 billion. In December 2007 Bello said the NIPC was open to assist any foreign investor who wished to do business in Nigeria. That month he said that the NIPC investment drive were attracting about N232 billion ($2 billion) annually into the economy. In February 2008, Bello noted that the Federal Government did not encourage investment in gambling-related businesses.

In February 2009 President Umaru Yar'Adua approved Bello's re-appointment as head of the NIPC for another five years. In October 2009 Bello announced that the NIPC and the Nigerian Tourism Development Corporation had formed a partnership to increase foreign investment in tourism. In November 2009 Bello said that Nigeria was keen to cement business ties with Iran. In January 2010 Bello welcomed officials of the Islamic Development Bank (IDB), who had come to discuss introducing the bank to stakeholders in Nigeria in the private and public sector. The bank aims to reduce poverty and promote economic development without any political attachment, in the same way as the World Bank and the International Monetary Fund. In February 2010 he met with officials of the United Nations Industrial Development Organization (UNIDO) and Bank of Industry (BOI), who were discussing providing funding to develop the Nigerian palm oil, rice and textile sectors. In February 2010 he said the government would try to sustain targeted foreign direct investment (FDI), which was currently at N2.98 trillion.
