= 2003 Niger State gubernatorial election =

2003 gubernatorial election in Niger State, Nigeria

- April 19, 2003
Nominee	Abdulkadir Kure	Mustafa Bello
Party	PDP	PRP
Running mate	Shem Zagbayi Nuhu	Jibrin Kolo Saba
Popular vote	561,929	247,695
Governor before election
Abdulkadir Kure
PDP
Elected Governor
Abdulkadir Kure
PDP

The 2003 Niger State gubernatorial election occurred in Nigeria on April 19, 2003. The PDP nominee Abdulkadir Kure won the election, defeating Mustafa Bello of the PRP.

Abdulkadir Kure emerged PDP candidate. He picked Shem Zagbayi Nuhu as his running mate. Mustafa Bello was the PRP candidate with Jibrin Kolo Saba as his running mate.

== Electoral system ==
The Governor of Niger State is elected using the plurality voting system.

== Primary election ==
=== PDP primary ===
The PDP primary election was won by Abdulkadir Kure. He picked Shem Zagbayi Nuhu as his running mate.

=== PRP primary ===
The PRP primary election was won by Mustafa Bello. He picked Jibrin Kolo Saba as his running mate.

== Results ==
A total number of 8 candidates registered with the Independent National Electoral Commission to contest in the election.

The total number of registered voters in the state was 1,607,730. Total number of votes cast was 1,044,681, while number of valid votes was 968,934. Rejected votes were 75,747.

Candidate	Party	Votes	%
Abdulkadir Kure	People's Democratic Party	561,929	69.41
Mustafa Bello	People's Redemption Party	247,695	30.59
Total		809,624	100.00
Valid votes		809,624	91.44
Invalid/blank votes		75,747	8.56
Total votes		885,371	100.00
Registered voters/turnout		1,607,730	55.07
Source: CCSU
