= Salihu Tunde Bello =

Nigerian politician and soldier

Military Administrator of Kebbi State
- In office 9 December 1993 – 22 August 1996
- Preceded by: Abubakar Musa
- Succeeded by: John Ubah

Personal details
- Children: 6
- Education: Nigerian Military School

Colonel (Later Brigadier General) Salihu Tunde Bello was Administrator of Kebbi State in Nigeria from December 1993 to August 1996 during the military regime of General Sani Abacha. During his administration he achieved significant development of the state infrastructure. In July 1999, after the return to democracy, all armed forces officers that had served in military governments for six months or more were forced to retire. Brigadier-General Salihu Bello was among those affected by this decision.

== Membership of professional body ==
In 2009 Salihu Bello was a member of the board of the Cocoa Research Institute of Nigeria (CRIN).
