= Nigerian Investment Promotion Commission =

National agency of the Federal Government of Nigeria

Agency overview
- Formed: 2004
- Type: Investment Promotion
- Jurisdiction: Federal Government of Nigeria
- Headquarters: Abuja, FCT, Nigeria
- Agency executive: Aisha Rimi, Executive Secretary/Chief Executive Officer;
- Website: nipc.gov.ng

The Nigerian Investment Promotion Commission (NIPC) is a specialized agency of the Federal Government of Nigeria, established through the Nigerian Investment Promotion Act Chapter N117 of 2004. It is aimed at encouraging, promoting, and coordinating all investments in Nigeria. The Federal Government of Nigeria, has tasked the investment promotion agency with attracting Foreign Direct Investment (FDI) over the years.

== Origin ==
The Nigerian Investment Promotion Commission was established by the United Nations Conference on Trade and Development through Chapter N117 of the Nigerian Investment Promotion Act of 1995, and later became a specialized agency of the Federal Government of Nigeria through Chapter N117 of the Nigerian Investment Promotion Act of 2004 by the former President of Nigeria Olusegun Aremu Obasanjo in a bid to enhance Nigeria's investment climate, attract foreign investments and deviate from oil as the major growth rate of the Nigerian economy. The then President appointed his former Minister for Commerce, Engr. Mustapha Bello as the pioneer Executive Secretary/CEO of the Commission and invited Mr Felix Ohiwerei, a boardroom guru, as the Chair of the Governing Board.

The commission was established to enhance Nigeria's investment climate, attract foreign investments and deviate from oil as the major growth rate of the Nigerian economy. Nigerian President, Olusegun Aremu Obasanjo appointed a former Minister for Commerce, Mustapha Bello as the pioneer Executive Secretary/CEO of the Commission, as well as Felix Ohiwerei, as the Chair of the Governing Board.

== Administration ==
NIPC has a Governing council that comprises a Chairman, four independent members, the Executive Secretary/CEOs' permanent secretaries of seven ministries including; Federal Ministry of Industry, Trade and Investment; Federal Ministry of Information and Culture, Federal Ministry of Finance, Federal Ministry of Budget and National Planning, Federal Ministry of Foreign Affairs, Federal Ministry of Interior, Federal Ministry of Petroleum, Governor, Central Bank of Nigeria and six members from the private sector.

The Commission's Governing Council is chaired by Rt. Hon. Dr Babangida S.M. Nguroje OFR. The Executive Secretary of the Commission is Saratu Altine Umar. The organogram of the Commission has seven specialized departments — Finance & Administration, Investment Promotion, Investor Relations, Human Resources, Policy Advocacy, States Coordination and Strategic Communications. The Commission was structured to consist of North-Central, North-East, North-West, South-East and South-West Zonal offices to work with sub-national state investment agencies in the coordinating and further actualization of the Federal Government's mandate.

=== Leadership ===
Aisha Rimi is the Executive Secretary/Chief Executive Officer of the Nigerian Investment Promotion Commission (NIPC). Prior to her appointment, Hajja Gana Wakil was the Commission's Acting Executive Secretary after Emeka Offor. Yewande Sadiku was the Executive Secretary and CEO from 8 November 2016 to 24 September 2021. In 2015, the former President Goodluck Ebele Jonathan relieved the appointment of Saratu Altine Umar.

=== Organisational structure ===
The Commission's Governing Council is chaired by Rt. Hon. Dr Babangida S.M. Nguroje OFR. The Executive Secretary's office is headed by Saratu Umar. The organogram of the Commission has seven specialised departments — Finance & Administration, Investment Promotion, Investor Relations, Human Resources, Policy Advocacy, States Coordination and Strategic Communications. Furthermore, the Commission was structured to consist of North-Central, North-East, North-West, South-East and South-West Zonal offices to work with sub-national state investment agencies in the coordinating and further actualisation of the Federal Government's mandate.
