= Emmanuel Acholonu =

Nigerian politician

- Appointed by: Sani Abacha

Military Administrator of Katsina State
- In office 9 December 1993 – 22 August 1996
- Preceded by: Saidu Barda
- Succeeded by: Samaila Bature Chamah

Emmanuel A. Acholonu is a retired Commodore in the Nigerian Navy and the former Administrator of Katsina State in Nigeria from December 1993 to August 1996 during the military regime of General Sani Abacha.

Lt, Commander, Acholonu was Directing Staff Junior Division Navy at the Armed Forces Command and Staff College, Jaji from August 1986 – May 1988.

Appointed governor of Katsina State in December 1993 after the coup that brought General Sani Abacha to power, Group Captain Acholonu defined improvements in water and education as his primary objectives.

In 1996 he said a law making it illegal to withdraw girls from schools would soon be enacted.

In September 1998, General Abdulsalami Abubakar appointed him a member of the military Provisional Ruling Council.

After the return to democracy in 1999, Acholonu was required to retire, as were all other former military administrators.
