= Sanusi Ohiare =

Nigerian politician

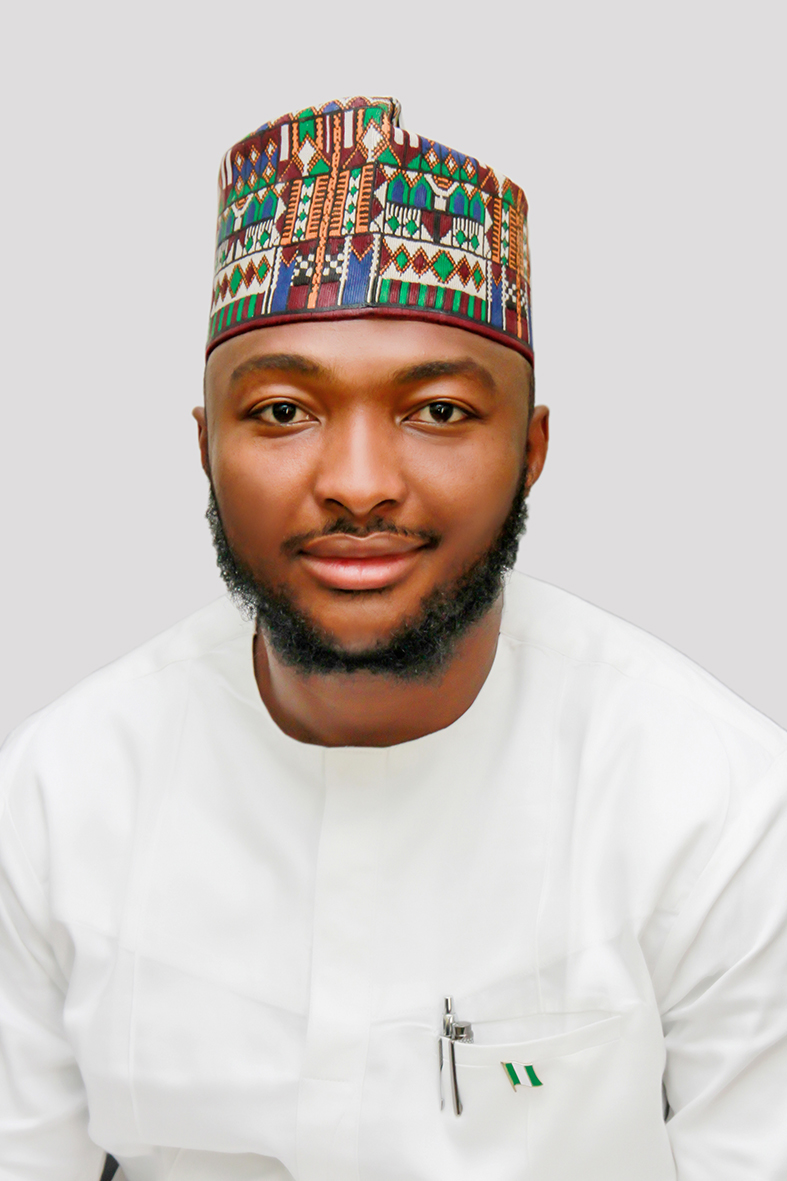

Executive Director: Rural Electrification Fund
- In office 24 April 2017 – February 2023
- Succeeded by: Hajiya Sa’adatu Belgore

Personal details
- Born: Sanusi Mohammed Ohiare; 6 March 1985 (age 41) Abuja, Federal Capital Territory, Nigeria
- Party: All Progressives Congress
- Parent: Mohammed Ohiare (father)
- Education: University of Jos; University of Dundee; De Montfort University
- Website: sanusiohiarefoundation.org

Sanusi Mohammed Ohiare (born 6 March 1985) is an Economist, Researcher, Energy Expert and astute Fund Manager; with 18 years experience of proven leadership and Management abilities in Public Service; Strategic planning; Public Private partnerships; Funds Mobilisation and Management; Education and Change Management. He has been a member of the ruling All Progressives Congress, APC in Nigeria since 7 February 2014.

In March 2017, he became at 32, the youngest Executive Director in a Federal Agency in Nigeria following his appointment by former President Muhammadu Buhari as Executive Director, Rural Electrification Fund (REF) and member of the management board of the Rural Electrification Agency (REA) of Nigeria. He was reappointed as Executive Director of the Rural Electrification Fund in January 2022 for another five years term by former president Muhammadu Buhari.

Ohiare resigned his position as Executive Director of the Rural Electrification Fund in February 2023 to contest the Kogi State gubernatorial primary election held in April, 2023 under the All Progressives Congress, APC.

== Early life and education ==
Ohiare was born on the 6 March 1985 in Abuja Nigeria's Federal Capital Territory where he spent most of his early years and he hails from Adavi Local Government Area in Kogi State north central Nigeria. His father, former Senator Mohammed Ohiare was representing Kogi central senatorial district at Nigeria's national assembly. He is a well known politician both in federal and state levels, he contributed positively to the development of the people within Kogi central senatorial district while serving as a senator and afterwards. Ohiare has a bachelor's degree in economics from University of Jos, Plateau state Nigeria between 2002 and 2006. Between 2009 and 2011, he attended the University of Dundee, Scotland, United Kingdom, where he obtained a Master of Science degree in energy Studies, with a specialization in energy finance. Thereafter, he received his PhD in Rural Energy Development from De Montfort University, Leicester, United Kingdom, in 2015

== Career ==
He was appointed by President Muhammadu Buhari in April 2017, as an executive director of the Rural Electrification Fund and board member under the Rural Electrification Agency of Nigeria. Prior to his being appointed as the executive director of the Rural Electrification Fund he worked with the German International Cooperation (Deutsche Gesellschaft für Internationale Zusammenarbeit),(GIZ), as a national advisor on rural electrification, under the Nigerian Energy Support Programme (NESP), which is co-funded by the European Union and German Government. With about 16 years experience within the Rural Electrification space he has brought his experience to bear on the job at the agency.

== Association memberships ==
He is a member of various professional bodies and associations such as International Association of Energy Economics (IAEE), an international non-profit society of professionals with interest in energy economics with also its national chapters in different parts of the world including the Nigerian Association of Energy Economics (NAEE), Nigeria, Lagos Oil Club, Society of Petroleum Engineers (SPE), Energy Institute United Kingdom. and a Fellow of Mandela Washington Fellowship for Young African Leaders, at The Regents of the University of California, Davis, California, United States.

== Humanitarian work and speaking activities ==
In 2019, he founded the Sanusi Ohiare Foundation for the purpose of empowering women and children in Africa through education, sports and rural electrification which he reaches out to the less privileged. He has presented speeches and also been a keynote speaker at several events on rural electrification including fourth national council on power in Edo state, policy dialogue in Abuja and other events in promoting rural electrification in Nigeria.

== Achievements ==
- He has contributed in facilitating the actualization of the rural electrification as stated in an interview in 2019 when he stated that about 43,000 households had been provide with electricity through the two billion naira fund received by the agency.
- As the executive director of Nigeria's Rural Electrification Fund (REF) he leads the dedication of staff and team members to ensure that electricity is equally distributed to various communities using rural electrification grants. Akpabom community in Akwa Ibom State, a community of about 2,000 people who are engaged mainly in crop and fish farming is one of the communities to first benefit from the first tranche of the fund which had been dormant prior to his appointment.

== Publications ==
- The Evolution of Rural Household Electricity Demand in Grid-Connected Communities in Developing Countries.
- Financing Rural Energy Projects in Developing Countries: A Case Study of Nigeria by Sanusi Mohammed Ohiare
- Financing Rural energy Projects in China: Lessons from Nigeria, Vol 3, No 4, 2021, ISSN 1923-4023

== Award & recognition(s) ==
- In 2021, he was published among Nigeria's 10 Under 50 Leaders in Public Service alongside the managing director and chief executive officer of the Rural Electrification Agency Mr Ahmad Salihijo Ahmad
- Global Finalists-Professional Achievement Award 2021 by the British Council.
- Young Leader of the 2020 African Power, Energy & Water Industry Awards
- Traditional title of Akiliwo Ejeh meaning (The Strength of the King) by the Ejeh of Olamaboro, His Royal Highness, Ujah Simeon Sani.
