= Samaila Bature Chamah =

Nigerian politician

Samuel Bature Chamah

Military Administrator of Katsina State
- In office 22 August 1996 – August 1998
- Preceded by: Emmanuel Acholonu
- Succeeded by: Joseph Akaagerger

Military Administrator of Kebbi State
- In office August 1998 – 29 May 1999
- Preceded by: John Ubah
- Succeeded by: Adamu Aliero

Brigadier General Samuel Bature Chamah was Administrator of Katsina State in Nigeria from August 1996 to August 1998 during the military regime of General Sani Abacha, and then of Kebbi State from August 1998 to May 1999 during the transitional regime of General Abdulsalami Abubakar, handing over power to the elected civilian governor Adamu Aliero on 29 May 1999.

All military governors and administrators in the Babangida, Abacha and Abubakar regimes were retired by the Federal Government in June 1999, including Brigadier-General Samuel Chamah.

Later he became the Managing Director /CEO of Falpas Ventures Limited and the Representative of My Africa magazine in Nigeria. Brigadier General (Deacon) Samaila Bature Chamah died at the IBB Golf club in Abuja in 2007.
