= Aliyu Bawa =

Nigerian footballer

Personal information
- Full name: Bawa Aliyu Bawa
- Date of birth: 10 February 1991 (age 35)
- Place of birth: Sokoto, Nigeria
- Height: 1.90 m (6 ft 3 in)
- Positions: Forward; attacking midfielder

Team information
- Current team: Akwa United F.C.
- Number: 18

Youth career
- 2005–2007: Elcruzero Football Academy

Senior career*
Years	Team	Apps	(Gls)
2007–2008	Niger Tornadoes F.C.	14	(6)
2008–2009	El-Kanemi Warriors F.C.	23	(11)
2009–2010	Kano Pillars F.C.	18	(7)
2010–2011	Sahel SC	20	(14)
2011–2012	Union Douala	14	(8)
2012–2013	Yong Sports Academy	22	(13)
2013–2014	Gombe United F.C.	11	(4)
2014–2016	Akwa United F.C.	37	(16)

International career^{‡}
2008–2009	Nigeria U-17	12	(4)
- * Club domestic league appearances and goals as of 15 November 2015 ‡ National team caps and goals as of 10 December 2011.

Aliyu Bawa (born 10 February 1991) is a Nigerian professional footballer who plays as a forward for Akwa United F.C.

== Club career ==
=== Early career ===
Bawa began his youth career with Elcruzero Football Academy Kaduna.

=== El-Kanemi Warriors F.C. (2008-2009) ===
In the 2008-2009 league season, he transferred to the El-Kanemi Warriors F.C. of Maiduguri, penning a year contract with them which earn him 23 match appearance and scoring 11 goals for the NPFL side.

=== Kano Pillars F.C. (2009-2010) ===
After an impressive season with El-Kanemi Warriors F.C. he caught the attention of Kano Pillars F.C. and he was offered a year contract for an undisclosed fee. He made 18 appearances and scoring 7 goals for the Nigeria Professional League side.

=== Sahel SC (2010-2011) ===
In the 2010-2011 season, Bawa joined a Niger Premier league side Sahel SC on a one-year contract making 20 appearances and netting 14 goals which marks his best season.

=== Union Douala (2011-2012) ===
In the 2011-2012 season, he moved to Cameroon to sign a year contract after agreeing terms and conditions with the elite one side Union Douala, making 14 appearances, scoring 11 goals.

=== Yong Sports Academy (2012-2013) ===
In the 2012-2013 season he move to another Elite One Yong Sports Academy in Cameroon on a year contract scoring 13 goals in 22 appearances.

=== Gombe United (2013-2014) ===
In the 2013-2014 league season, he returned to Nigeria after agreeing with the terms and conditions of the division one side Gombe United F.C. He pen a year contract with them, scoring just 4 goals in 11 appearances due to injury.

=== Akwa United (2014-2016) ===
In the 2014-2015 season, he sign one-year deal with the Nigeria Professional Football League side Akwa United F.C. he made 15 appearances for them netting 4 goals. On 6 January 2016. Aliyu extended one-year deal with the Nigeria Professional Football League side Akwa United F.C. making 22 appearances for them, netting 12 goals.
