= Yewande Sadiku =

Nigerian investment banker (born 1972)

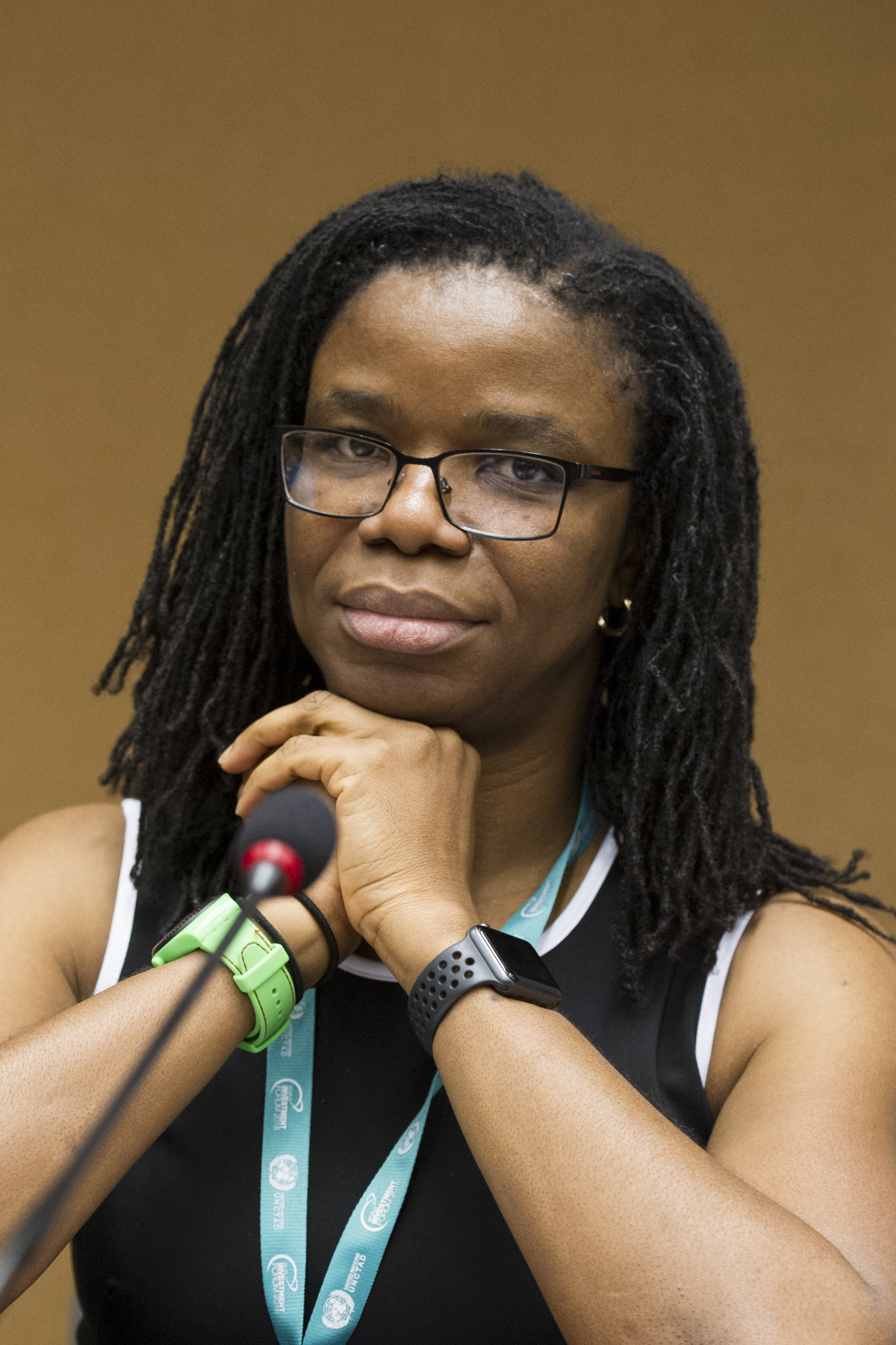
Yewande Sadiku in 2018 at the World Investment Forum

Yewande Sadiku (born 27 July 1972) is a Nigerian investment banker and former public servant. She was the executive secretary and CEO of the Nigerian Investment Promotion Commission from 8 November 2016 to 24 September 2021.

== Education ==
In 1992, Sadiku graduated from University of Benin with a Bachelor of Science degree in Industrial Chemistry. She went on to get a Master of Business Administration degree from the University of Warwick in 1995.

== Career ==
She worked at Nigeria International Bank Limited (now Citibank Nigeria) from 1992 to 1994. In 1996, she joined Investment Banking & Trust Company Limited (later to be known as Stanbic IBTC Bank), rising to become chief executive officer of Stanbic IBTC Capital in November 2012.

She went into banking despite studying Chemistry, "In my final year at the University of Benin, a roommate asked me to accompany her to the venue of an aptitude test for a bank. I sat outside the venue waiting for her for about 5 minutes and then for some reason, I decided to write the test myself. The following day, I emerged as a successful candidate even though ironically, my roommate was unsuccessful".

She worked at Citibank for two years before earning an MBA from the University of Warwick. After receiving job offers from Total and Arthur Andersen, she joined IBTC, then a relatively new bank. She was awarded the Eisenhower Fellowship for International Leadership in May 2010. In 2014, Yewande raised funding for the adaptation of the Chimamanda Ngozi Adichie novel, Half of a Yellow Sun, into a full feature film where she (Yewande) served as Executive Producer.

She became executive director, corporate and investment of Stanbic IBTC Bank in July 2015.

She was appointed as executive secretary and chief executive officer of the Nigerian Investment Promotion Commission (NIPC), in September 2016 by president Muhammadu Buhari.

Under Sadiku, the NIPC improved in ranking from 90th (2016) to 1st (2021) in the Freedom of Information (FOI) Rankings for compliance and transparency. NIPC's internally generated revenue also went from N296 million in 2016 to N3.06 billion in 2020 of which over 50% of this revenue was remitted to the consolidated revenue fund.

In June 2022, Yewande Sadiku was appointed head of international investment banking at Standard Bank.

== Allegations ==
In August 2021, The Economic and Financial Crimes Commission investigated Sadiku for alleged abuse of office, contract fraud and allowances unaccounted for. No charges were pressed against her and the act was criticized by groups as harassment from the EFCC. In December 2021, the Independent Corrupt Practices Commission confirmed that they had closed the case investigating her, as none of the allegations made against her was established. She is widely respected for her commitment to transparency, accountability and good corporate governance.
