= Ibrahim Magu =

Former acting chairman of EFCC

Chairman of the EFCC
- In office 9 November 2015 – 7 July 2020
- Preceded by: Ibrahim Lamorde
- Succeeded by: Mohammed Umar Abba

Personal details
- Born: 5 May 1962 (age 64) Maiduguri, Borno State
- Education: Ahmadu Bello University
- Occupation: Police officer

Ibrahim Magu (born 5 May 1962) is a Nigerian police officer who served as acting chairman of the Economic and Financial Crimes Commission, EFCC from 9 November 2015, until his suspension on 7 July 2020. He was replaced by Muhammed Umar as the acting EFCC chairman.

Magu was appointed as EFCC chairman after Ibrahim Lamorde, who had earlier served twice, was sacked by the president of Nigeria, Muhammadu Buhari. Both Lamorde and Magu served during Nuhu Ribadu’s time at the anti-graft agency and were also credited with part of the success Ribadu recorded in his time.

== Early career ==
Magu was born on 5 May 1962 in Maiduguri, Borno State. He attended Maiduguri’s primary school (from 1969 to 1975), Waka Biu's Secondary School from 1975 to 1980, and Ahmadu Bello University, Zaria from 1982 to 1986, where he graduated with a BSc in accounting. After the completion of his National Youth Service Corps, he served in various ministries and departments in the Borno State Government as an accountant and rose to become a zonal accountant before he voluntarily resigned to join the Nigeria Police Force as an assistant superintendent of police in 1990. He was the coordinator for the Nigeria Police Building Society before moving on to the Special Fraud Unit (SFU) of the Nigeria Police Criminal Investigations Department (CID), where he served as a team leader in charge of financial crimes, money laundering and advance fee fraud investigation.

He served as a member of the investigative committee convened by National Security Advisor (NSA), Babagana Monguno on the orders of President Muhammadu Buhari to probe the procurement of arms in the Armed Forces from 2007 to 2020.

Magu remains unconfirmed as the chairman of EFFC which is one of the challenges and controversies being faced by the administration of President Muhammadu Buhari on appointments and nominations confirmation. The Police Service Commission (PSC) on Friday, 28 April 2018 announced the promotion of 18 senior officers after her 27th Plenary Meeting which ended in Abuja where Magu was promoted to the rank of a full commissioner from deputy commissioner.

At the end of the 8th Regional Conference of Anti-Corruption Agencies in Commonwealth Africa held at Transcorp Hilton (Abuja, Nigeria) on 19 May 2018, Magu emerged as their new chairman. His appointment was the high point of a five-day regional conference with the theme: “Partnering Towards Assets Recovery and Return”.

On 29 May 2018, the EFCC announced that 603 Nigerian figures had been convicted on corruption charges since Buhari and Magu assumed their offices in 2015. The EFCC also announced that for the first time in Nigeria's history, judges and military officials were prosecuted.

== Arrest ==
On 6 July 2020, Magu was arrested for corruption charges related to finances he allegedly embezzled for, among other things, supporting his lavish living and traveling expenses. Twenty-two corruption allegations were reported against Magu in June 2020 as well. Following his arrest, Magu remained in custody.

On 7 July 2020, Magu was suspended as the chairman of Economic and Financial Crimes Commission (EFCC) because of corruption allegations leveled against him.

The panel had specifically recommended that Magu should be removed “for failing to properly account for N431,000,000.00 security votes/information fund released to the office of the Executive Chairman of EFCC between November 2015 and May 2020”. The panel also recommended that Magu should be referred to the inspector-general of police for “necessary disciplinary action”.

That week, President Buhari convened an investigative panel led by Justice Ayo Salami. In late November the panel presented its report (the "Salami Report") confidentially to President Buhari. Two weeks later, President Buhari released the report which cleared Magu of the charges, and indicated that there had been a plot to discredit Magu in order to stop his anti-corruption activities. It is suggested that Attorney General Abubakar Malami was involved with the plot, in part because of the animosity he showed towards Magu, and his direct action writing a letter to President Buhari on 5 June 2020 entitled "Flagrant abuse of public office and other infractions committed by Mr Ibrahim Magu, acting chairman of the Economic and Financial Crimes Commission".

Magu was exonerated on 4 October 2022 over a false claim that Pastor Emmanuel Omale of the Divine Hand of God Prophetic Ministry and his wife, Deborah, had laundered 573 million naira for him. Magu was quoted as saying “I am a victim of corruption fighting back, but I am happy that recent events are revealing the truth to Nigerians".
