= Abdullahi Aliyu =

Nigerian Civil servant

Permanent Secretary, Ministry of Science and Technology

Personal details
- Born: 28 January 1957 (age 69) Damau, Kubau LGA, Kaduna State
- Education: B. Engineering, M.Sc Mechanical engineering, Ahmadu Bello University, Zaria, PhD Mechanical Engineering, Illinois Institute of Technology, Chicago, United States
- Occupation: Civil servant
- Profession: Mechanical Engineer

Aliyu Abdullahi (born 28 January 1957) is a Nigerian Civil servant who joined the Civil Service in August 1988 and became a Permanent Secretary in January 2001. In 2003 he was appointed Permanent Secretary of the Federal Ministry of Science and Technology. In July 2007 Aliyu said that he had received a presidential mandate to explore the use of nuclear energy in Nigeria for the generation of electricity.

In March 2008, as the Permanent Secretary in the Ministry of Energy (Power Section), Aliyu testified before a panel investigating expenditures in the power sector in the previous eight years. He said that contracts had been awarded by the former minister of Power and Steel and the Presidency, and said that the civil service had not been involved in the contract awards and payments.

In May 2009 he was suspended from office and arraigned by a High Court in Abuja over alleged fraud in the rural electrification contracts, along with Senator Nicholas Ugbane and 7 others. The Economic and Financial Crimes Commission (EFCC) said the accused had breached public trust and conspired among themselves to defraud the country. The High Court ordered that the accused be remanded in prison custody until June 4, 2009 when it would decide on their bail requests. He was granted bail, but in June 2009 was rearrested by the EFCC on fresh charges. In November 2009 the EFCC preferred a fresh 130-count charge for defrauding the government of over N5.2bn. All of the accused pleaded "not guilty". In December 2017, the Court of Appeal in Abuja discharged and acquitted Aliyu for the offences of conspiracy to commit criminal breach of trust and criminal breach of trust contrary to Section 97 (1) and Section 315 of the Penal Code ACT CAP. 532 LFN 1990.

== Background ==
Abdullahi Aliyu was born on 28 January 1957 in Damau, Kubau Local Government Area of Kaduna State. He attended Government College Kaduna from 1971 to 1975, then went on to Ahmadu Bello University (ABU), Zaria where he obtained a First Class Honours B. Engr in Mechanical Engineering; M.Sc in Mechanical Engineering and a PhD in Mechanical Engineering from Illinois Institute of Technology, Chicago, United States.

== Career ==
Aliyu lectured at Ahmadu Bello University, Zaria and the University of Zimbabwe, Harare, before joining the Raw Materials Research and Development Council (RMRDC), Abuja, in 1988. In 1994, he was appointed the Director-General and Chief Executive of RMRDC, where he succeeded in advising the Federal Government to ban the importation of two industrial raw materials in 1996, gypsum for cement production and barley malt for soft drink production and substituted them with locally sourced gypsum and sorghum malt. In August 1997, Abdullahi Aliyu was appointed the Pioneer Director-General and Chief Executive of the Family Economic Advancement Programme (FEAP). He said the programme remains Nigeria's only hope in the big task of reducing poverty and minimising income disparities between the rich and the poor. He was a visiting professor at Abubakar Tafawa Balewa University, Bauchi in 1998. In 2001, FEAP was transformed to National Poverty Eradication Programme (NAPEP) as a move to address poverty in Nigeria and related issues, where he served as a Federal Permanent Secretary. In 2007, Dr Aliyu was awarded for his services to the nation with the title of Officer of the Order of the Niger (OON) by former late President Umaru Musa Yar'Adua.
