= Jummai Babangida Aliyu =

Nigerien teacher and education research officer

First Lady of Niger State 2007-2015

Personal details
- Born: 1959 (age 65–66) Niger State

Jummai Babangida Aliyu was born in 1959 in Niger State. She is the wife of the former governor of Niger State, a teacher, an education research officer, and a guidance and counseling officer at the Education Resource Center, Abuja.

== Early life and education ==
Aliyu was born in 1959 in Niger State. She started her secondary education at the age of thirteen at the Government Girls Secondary School Minna between 1972 and 1976. She enrolled in Women Teachers College at Minna where she obtained her Grade II Teachers Certificate between 1978 and 1979. She enrolled in the NCE for the Advanced Teachers College between 1979 and 1982. She obtained her Bachelor of Arts degree at the University of Abuja between 1994 and 1997.

== Career ==
Aliyu was a teacher, an education research officer, and a guidance and counselling officer at the Education Resource Center, Abuja. She is the founder and chair of the Life Rehabilitation Foundation for Womanhood, and the matron of many organizations such as IWO (Nigerian chapter), the National Association of Students Nurses and Midwifery (Niger State chapter), and the Grand Matron, Nigerian Association of Women Journalists (NAWOJ) (Niger State chapter).

== Honours ==
Aliyu has received many accolades for her generosity and humanitarianism. The African Mandate Global Initiative in collaboration with Fix Nigerian Initiative awarded her in 2008. She also received a merit award from the National Council of Women in 2007 and 2008, and the Association for Peace and Progress in Nigeria.

A hospital in Minna, the Jummai Babangida Aliyu Maternal and Neonatal Hospital, Minna, was named after her.

== Bibliography ==
- Kabir, Hajara Muhammad, Northern women development. [Nigeria]. ISBN 978-978-906-469-4. OCLC 890820657.
