= Aliyu Musa =

Nigerian politician (born 1957)

Member of the House of Representatives of Nigeria from Katsina
- Incumbent
- Assumed office 3 June 1999
- Constituency: Mani/Bindawa

Personal details
- Born: 1 December 1957 (age 68)
- Party: Peoples Democratic Party
- Education: Ahmadu Bello University
- Occupation: Politician

Aliyu Musa (born 1 December 1957) is a Nigerian politician. He has been a member of the House of Representatives since 1999 representing the Mani/Bindawa constituency of Katsina State. He is a member of the Peoples Democratic Party.

== Political career ==
In 1999, Musa was elected representative of the Mani/Bindawa constituency of Katsina State. In 2019, he ran for the governorship seat in Sokoto State under the APC platform and came second in the election. Musa was also confirmed by the Senate as the chairman of the Independent Corrupt Practices and Other Related Offenses Commission.
