= Abubakar Musa =

Nigerian politician

Abubakar Musa Garkuwan Yauri

Governor of Kebbi State
- In office January 1992 – November 1993
- Preceded by: Patrick Aziza
- Succeeded by: Salihu Tunde Bello

Alhaji Abubakar Musa is a Nigerian politician who was elected on the National Republican Convention (NRC) platform as Governor of Kebbi State, Nigeria, holding office between January 1992 and November 1993 during the Nigerian Third Republic.

Before entering politics, Musa was Director of Customs.

Musa was accused of tampering with ballot boxes in the December 1991 elections, but when they took place he was in fact abroad undergoing medical treatment. In July 1993 he enacted the edict to form the Kebbi State College of Education, now the Adamu Augie College of Education.

In June 2002, he was the national treasurer of the newly formed National Democratic Party (NDP). He was a candidate to be the People's Democratic Party (PDP) for governor in the 2003 elections. In January 2003 he was at a meeting where Kebbi Governor Muhammad Adamu Aliero announced his intention to run for reelection in April 2003 on the All Nigeria Peoples Party (ANPP) platform.
