= Ahmad Rufai Zakari =

- Born: 25 February 1984 (age 42); Jigawa, Nigeria
- Known for: Engineering; Oil and Gas; Infrastructure Finance; SA to presidency
- Title: Engineer and Consultant

Ahmad Rufai Zakari (born 25 February 1984), is a Nigerian expert on financial infrastructure on power. Ahmed is the executive director of Gas Power Installed Fleet and Services for Nigeria/South Africa General Electric. He served as the Special Adviser to President Muhammadu Buhari on Infrastructure from 2019 to 2023.

== Early life and family ==
Ahmad was born on 25 February 1984 to the family of Mr. and Mrs. Zakari Kazaure of Jigawa State. His father, Mr. Zakari Kazaure was a banker and an economist before his death in 2000. He is the first child in the family of five (5) children.

== Educational background ==
After attending secondary school in Nigeria, Ahmad got admission to study bachelor degree in Electrical Engineering/Economics from State University of New York at Buffalo, and in 2006 at the age of 22 years he graduated. While in University, he developed interest in Oil and gas and financial infrastructure in Power.

== Career ==
From 2006 to 2008, he was among the youngest Engineer admitted to build a career at General Electric through a programme known as Edison Engineering Development Programme, USA. He was later employed to work as an Electric Engineer at General Electric.

From September 2012 to January 2014, Ahmad was the executive director and Audit manager of GE Corporate (aligned to Oil and Gas, Sub Saharan Africa & Middle East) and was the first African to be promoted to the position of Executive Audit Manager.

In 2013, he served as the co-chair for the revamp of the Acquisition Integration Framework for GE leading 30 executives.

Between 2015 and 2017, he was the Executive Director/Chief Operating Officer of General Electric, Nigeria.

== Achievements ==
Mr. Ahmad was the first African to be promoted to Executive Audit Manager Position and responsible for global financial/compliance audits and operational consulting for $20B GE Oil and Gas unit.

He was responsible for the company's gas power installation based in Nigeria and South Africa. This amounts to over 150 turbines and up to 8GW of installed capacity.

== Awards and honours ==
- GE Power Services Middle East and Africa Team of the Year Award (SSA)
- GE Global Chairman's Circle Award
- GE Corporate Audit Staff Individual Award – Sub Saharan Africa structural review
- GE Corporate Audit Staff Team Award – Global Growth Organization Shared Service Award

== Political appointment ==
In 2019, the President of Federal Republic of Nigeria, President Muhammadu Buhari appointed him as the Special Adviser to the presidency on Infrastructure. He was among the few youth appointed as aids to the presidency.
