= Abubakar Koko =

Administrator

Alhaji Abubakar Koko
- Born: 1937
- Died: 26 December 2003 (aged 65–66)
- Honours: OFR

Alhaji Abubakar Garba Koko, OFR, Sarkin Yakin Gwandu, (1937 – 26 December 2003), was a Nigerian civil servant, Administrator, and Politician who served as the first Executive Secretary of the Federal Capital Development Authority (FCDA), Abuja. He planned and executed the development of Nigeria's new federal capital in the 80s.

== Early life and education ==
He was born in Birnin Kebbi, in 1937, and attended elementary school in Sokoto, and middle school in Katsina. Koko later attended the Ilorin Institute of Education where he trained to become a Teacher. He also studied administration at Ahmadu Bello University, and later at Wadham College, Oxford University.

== Career and politics ==
From 1955 to 1981, Koko worked as a Teacher and Administrative officer, and later served on many company boards.

Board	Title
NBCI Cooperative Bank, Sokoto	Chairman
ABU Zaria Council	Member
North Western State	Permanent Secretary
FCDA Abuja	Executive Secretary
Ministry of Aviation	Permanent Secretary
Habib Bank Limited	Director
Dolphine Fisheries Limited	Chairman
Sangara Farms	Chairman
E.M.C Limited	Chairman

Koko was a member of several Nigerian political parties, some of which are now defunct. These include the Social democratic Party (SDP), Peoples Front of Nigeria, United Nigeria Congress Party, and the Peoples Democratic Party (PDP).

== Abuja master plan ==
Abubakar is best known for his role as the executive secretary of the FCDA, responsible for the development and execution of the Abuja Master plan.

The move of Nigeria's Capital to Abuja was controversial, and the biggest opposition to it, was led by Obafemi Awolowo. Awolowo as a politician and a representative of the Yoruba people defended their claims against the move of the Capital from Lagos. During the Hotly contested campaign for presidency, He vowed to hire the American Walt Disney Corporation to convert the new site (Abuja) into an amusement park if he was elected. However, after his election as president, Alhaji Shehu Shagari showed a lot of support for the project and pushed for its early completion. His first Journey outside of Lagos after his election, was to Abuja, where he visited contractors and workers on site to urge a speedy completion of the project. On his return, he confided in Alhaji Abubakar Koko his disappointment with the slow progress of work. Shehu Shagari rescheduled the planned relocation to Abuja from 1986 to 1982 which later proved difficult.

The International Planning Associates (IPA) was commissioned in June, 1977, by the Federal Capital Development Authority (FCDA) to produce the Abuja Master Plan and its regional grid. According to the terms of reference, the master planning process was to include a review of relevant data, selection of a capital city site, preparation of regional and city plans and the accompanying design and development standards manual.

IPA did not exist prior to the Nigerian Government's engagement for an internationally reputable firm to design the master plan. IPA was formed by a consortium of three American firms which won the worldwide competitive bidding. After winning the bid, and completing the project, the firms were disbanded. The firms were Planning Research Corporation (PRC), Wallace, McHarg, Roberts and Todd, and Archisystems (a division of the Hughes Organisation).

Abraham Krushkov addressed the final report of the Abuja master plan to Alhaji Abubakar Koko on 15 February 1979. In the preface to the master plan, the following declaration was made by IPA:

The master plan for Abuja the new Capital City of Nigeria represents the culmination of 18 months' work by the Federal Capital Development Authority (FCDA) board, several advisory panels consultants. Without the unstinting efforts of these experts, the momentum now exhibited in the beginning of actual implementation of the new capital could not have been achieved. The plan itself represents a milestone in the process of building the new capital city. It is a necessary element in the monumental effort about to be undertaken by the Nigerian people.

== Legacy ==
In a book written in honor of Alhaji Abubakar 'With All My Strength' a Minister in the second republic Alhaji Idris Koko, said:

At the time Abubakar Koko was given the assignment, people were not sure whether Abuja would succeed. To go into that area (FCT) which was like a wilderness to build a federal capital was very challenging. He worked extremely hard to make Abuja a reality. He displayed a great sense of sacrifice, selfless service and no doubt made a name there; he was widely known. He made a most judicious use of the meagre resources available to them. "

Abubakar Koko Crescent, and Abubakar Koko Avenue in Abuja are named after him. He also had the traditional title of 'Sarkin Yakin Gwandu' which later passed on to his son. Alhaji Koko was also Awarded Officer of the Order of the Federal Republic (OFR).

== Personal life ==
Koko was a sunni Muslim, and had 3 wives. He also had 18 children, ten Sons, and eight Daughters.
