= Hadiza Bala Usman =

Nigerian activist and politician (born 1976)

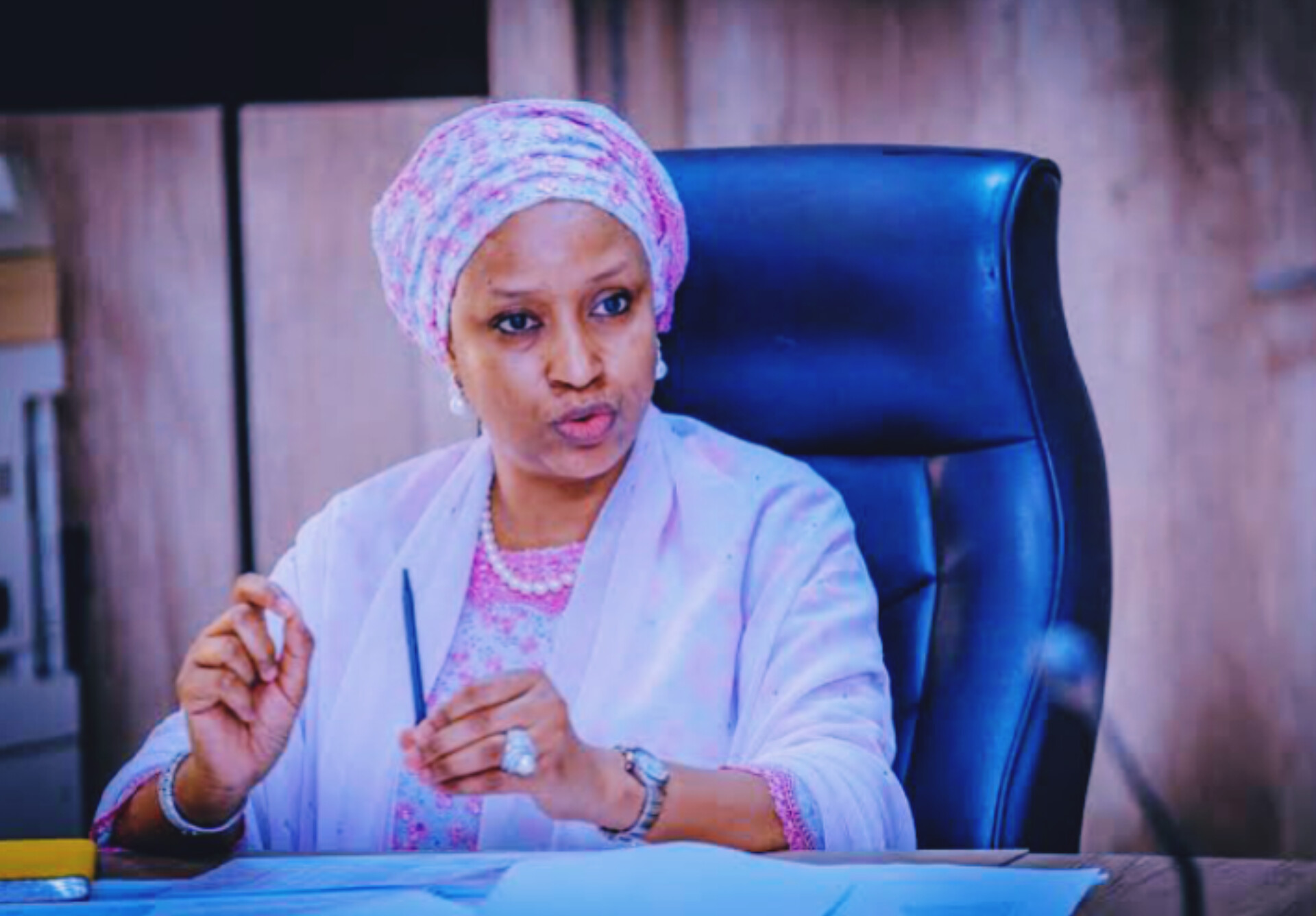

Special Adviser on Policy Coordination to the President
- Incumbent
- Assumed office 19 June 2023
- President: Bola Tinubu

Managing Director of Nigerian Ports Authority
- In office 11 July 2016 – 6 May 2021
- Preceded by: Habibu Abdullahi
- Succeeded by: Mohammed Bello-Koko

Personal details
- Born: 2 January 1976 (age 50) Zaria, Kaduna State, Nigeria
- Party: All Progressives Congress (2013–present)
- Other political affiliations: Peoples Democratic Party (until 2010); Congress for Progressive Change (2010–2013)
- Relations: Bala Usman (father); Abdullahi Bayero (great grandfather)
- Children: 2
- Education: Ahmadu Bello University; University of Leeds

Hadiza Bala Usman (born 2 January 1976) is a Nigerian politician who served as managing director of the Nigerian Ports Authority from 2016 to 2021. She previously served as the chief of staff to the governor of Kaduna State from 2015 to 2016. She was appointed special adviser on Policy and Coordination Central Delivery Coordination Unit (CDCU) to President Bola Tinubu in June 2023, together with Hannatu Musawa, who is currently serving as minister of Art, Culture and the Creative Economy of Nigeria.

Since 2014, Usman is one of the co-founders of the Bring Back Our Girls campaign, and is also a founding member of the ruling All Progressives Congress.

== Early life and education ==
Hadiza Bala Usman was born on 2 January 1976 in Zaria to a Fulani ruling class family of the Sullubawa clan. Her father, Yusufu Bala Usman, the grandson of Sarkin Katsina Muhammadu Katsina Dikko, was a prominent academic and historian who founded the Centre for Democratic Development, Research and Training in Zaria. Her great-grandfather, Abdullahi Bayero (father to her paternal grandmother), was the 10th Emir of Kano from 1926 to 1953, her paternal grand father was the Durbin Katsina, her grand uncle was Usman Nagogo the Emir of Katsina and her great-grandfather was Sarkin Katsina Muhammadu Dikko (father to her paternal grandfather).

Usman grew up on the campus of Ahmadu Bello University in Zaria, where her father worked. She started her education at the university staff primary school and went ahead to complete her secondary education. In 1996, she enrolled at the university and received a bachelor's degree in business administration in 2000. She received a master's degree in development studies from the University of Leeds in 2009.

== Career ==
=== Private sector ===
In 1999, she spent a year at the Centre for Democratic Development and Research Training in Zaria as a research assistant.

She then worked at the Bureau of Public Enterprises from July 2000 to August 2004 as an enterprise officer. From October 2004 to January 2008, she was then hired by the UNDP for the Federal Capital Territory Administration as a special assistant to the Minister on project implementation.

In 2011, Usman campaigned and lost for the federal constituency of Musawa/Matazu as a candidate of the Congress for Progressive Change. She then joined the Good Governance Group in Nigeria, a non-governmental organisation, as the country director of strategy from 2011 to July 2015.

In 2014, following the Chibok schoolgirls kidnapping by Boko Haram, Usman co-founded the Bring Back Our Girls campaign group to create awareness and advocate the rescue of the abducted schoolgirls. She chose the colour red for the campaign because it is a sign of "alarm, danger, a warning." Usman also helped coordinate meetings with the parents of the kidnapped girls and members of the Nigerian government. She has continued to protest with the group into 2016.

=== Public sector ===
In 2015, following his election, Governor Nasir Ahmad el-Rufai appointed her as Chief of Staff to the Governor of Kaduna State, thus becoming the first female to hold that position. She was appointed as the managing director of Nigerian Ports Authority (NPA) in July 2016 by President Muhammadu Buhari. Her appointment generated a lot of controversies as many saw her nomination as ethnically based and questioned her qualification for the specific role. On May 6, 2021, President Muhammadu Buhari approved her suspension as the managing director of Nigerian Ports Authority (NPA). Usman, who was recently re-appointed for second term, was suspended following a public spate with then transport minister Rotimi Amaechi. She was the Deputy Director-General Administration of the Tinubu/Shettima APC Presidential Campaign Council for the 2023 presidential election.

Her book, Stepping on Toes: My Odyssey at Nigerian Ports Authority, was published by TheCable Books in April 2023.

In June 2023, she was appointed Special Adviser to the President on Policy Coordination by Bola Ahmed Tinubu.

== Personal life ==
Usman was married to economic analyst Tanimu Yakubu Kurfi, who served under the former (late) President Umaru Musa Yar'adua as economic adviser. Together they have two boys.. She is currently married to Shehu Dikko, the chairman of National sports commission (NSC) in Nigeria.

== Recognition ==
Usman has been recognized in various ways for her achievements both in the maritime sector as Queen of the Maritime and Nigeria's public service among "Under 50 Leaders in Public Service" in 2021 when she received the outstanding female executive in public service (Maritime) award alongside other prominent women in public service.
