= Nuhu Ribadu =

Nigerian politician and police officer (born 1960)

Nuhu Ribadu Sardauna adamawa mni (born 21 November 1960) is a Nigerian politician, barrister and retired police officer who is currently serving as the National Security Adviser to Nigerian President Bola Tinubu.

Ribadu ran unsuccessfully for office of the President of Nigeria in 2011 as the candidate of the Action Congress. He ran for governor of Adamawa State in 2015 as a candidate of the Peoples Democratic Party; before joining the All Progressives Congress to run in 2019 and lost his bid in 2023 to Aishatu Dahiru Ahmed.

He was the Chairman of the Petroleum Special Revenue Task Force from 2012 to 2014 and the Chairman of Economic and Financial Crimes Commission (EFCC) from 2003 to 2007.

== Early life and education ==
Ribadu was born on 21 November 1960 in Yola. His father, Ahmadu Ribadu, was a First Republic Member of Parliament, and Ambassador to Niger, during the military regime of Muhammadu Buhari. He attended Mustapha Primary School from 1966 to 1973 in Adamawa and Yelwa Government Secondary School, Yola from 1973 to 1978; College of Preliminary Studies, Yola from 1978 to 1980.

Ribadu studied law at Ahmadu Bello University in Zaria, Kaduna State from 1980 until 1983, receiving a Bachelor of Laws degree. Following a year at the Nigerian Law School, he was called to Bar in 1984. He also earned a Master of Laws degree from the same university.

== Police career ==
Ribadu joined the Nigerian Police Force shortly after graduation and held the positions of Assistant Superintendent of Police, Nigeria Police Force, 1 January 1986; Divisional Crime Officer for Ajegunle, Mushin, Apapa from 1990 to 1997; Force CID. AIagbon Close, Ugos; dep. Superintendent of Police, 1992; Superintendent of Police, 1995; Chief Superintendent of Police, 1998; asst comm. of Police, 2002; Head, Legal and Prosecution Department, NPF.

=== Anti-corruption and the EFCC ===
The Nigerian president, Olusegun Obasanjo, appointed Ribadu as the pioneer chairman of the EFCC in 2003 and reappointed him in 2007.

On 20 October 2006, Nuhu Ribadu told the BBC that over 380 billion dollars had been stolen or wasted by Nigerian governments since independence in 1960. Under Ribadu's administration, the EFCC charged prominent bankers, former state governors, ministers, Senators, high-ranking political party members, even the head of the Nigerian police.

The EFCC issued thousands of indictments and achieved about 270 convictions during his stint in office. One notable case was that of his boss, the then Inspector General of the Nigerian Police Force, Tafa Balogun, who was convicted, jailed and made to return £150 million under a plea bargain.

During the course of his duty Ribadu was offered bribes to pervert the course of justice, amongst these was a State governor who offered Ribadu $15 million and a house abroad. Interviewed from Washington D.C. on the BBC's Hardtalk, Ribadu said that he took the money and used the bribe as evidence to prosecute the state governor. This claim has however been refuted by the ex-governor who claimed that the fact that Ribadu put the money in the CBN is not a proof that he gave the money. Ribadu escaped two assassination attempts in Nigeria before he left the country for the United Kingdom in early 2009.

Less than 2 months before the end of the Obasanjo administration, he was promoted to the position of Assistant Inspector General of Police. The promotion on 9 April 2007, was later challenged on the basis that it was "illegal, unconstitutional, null and void, and of no legal effect." In December 2007, Mike Okiro, Inspector-General of Police, stated that Ribadu would be removed as EFCC chairman and sent on a one-year training course.

In December 2007, Inspector-General of Police Mike Okiro ordered that Ribadu be temporarily removed from the position of EFCC chairman and ordered him to attend the National Institute of Policy and Strategic Studies (NIPSS) in Kuru, Jos, Plateau State for a mandatory one-year course. The decision was criticised by, among others, Nobel Laureate Wole Soyinka, House of Representatives members, and All Nigeria Peoples Party (ANPP) national chairman Edwin Ume-Ezeoke as politically motivated and/or likely to set back the fight against corruption.

== Exile and return ==
On 22 December 2008, as widely predicted, he was dismissed from the Nigerian Police Force by the Nigerian Police Service Commission (PSC). He left Nigeria and in April assumed a fellowship at the Center for Global Development. He lived in exile until 2010 when he returned to Nigeria and declared his intention to run for President of Nigeria under the platform of the Action Congress of Nigeria (ACN) political party.

== Entry into politics ==
Ribadu returned to Nigeria and joined opposition ACN as the presidential candidate on 14 January 2011. Tinubu had campaigned for a merger between the ACN and the CPC, but the plan failed due to Ribadu’s refusal to step down for CPC candidate Muhammadu Buhari. After the merger talks collapsed, Tinubu decided to choose Ribadu’s running mate for the April presidential elections.

Shortly after Jonathan won the election, Ribadu joined a six-man UN monitoring team tasked with auditing Afghanistan’s governance, the third most corrupt country in the world. The committee aimed to reduce corruption in Afghanistan. While on this international assignment, the Jonathan administration asked him to chair the Petroleum Special Revenue Task Force, tasked with improving accountability in Nigeria’s oil and gas sector.

In August 2014, he defected to the ruling party PDP with the intention to run for the Governorship of Adamawa State, Nigeria. He later joined the ruling APC and contested for governorship of Adamawa in 2019 and 2023, he became a close confidant of Bola Tinubu during the presidential campaign.

== National Security Adviser ==
Ribadu was appointed by President Bola Tinubu as National Security Adviser on 19 June 2023. In March 2024, Ribadu oversaw the arrest and detention of two employees of cryptocurrency exchange Binance, including a former United States Internal Revenue Service agent, for Binance's alleged role in market manipulation that led to a drop in value of Nigerian currency.
