= Economic and Financial Crimes Commission =

Nigerian Law enforcement agency

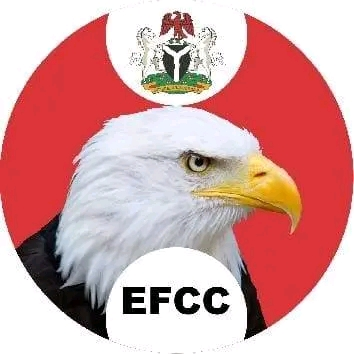
- Abbreviation: EFCC

Agency overview
- Formed: 2003; 23 years ago

Jurisdictional structure
- Operations jurisdiction: Nigeria
- Legal jurisdiction: Economic and financial crimes
- Governing body: President of Nigeria
- Constituting instrument: EFCC Establishment Act 2004
- Specialist jurisdiction: Serious or complex fraud, commercial crime, fraud covering multiple lower level jurisdictions

Operational structure
- Headquarters: Plot 301/302, Institution and Research Cadastral District, Jabi, Abuja, Federal Capital Territory
- Agency executive: Olanipekun Olukayode, Chairman

Website
- https://www.efcc.gov.ng

The Economic and Financial Crimes Commission (EFCC) is a Nigerian law enforcement and anti-graft agency that investigates financial crimes and unknown transactions such as advance fee fraud (419 fraud) and money laundering. The EFCC was established in 2003, partially in response to pressure from the Financial Action Task Force on Money Laundering (FATF), which named Nigeria as one of 23 countries non-cooperative in the international community's efforts to fight money laundering. The agency has its head office in Abuja, Nigeria. The EFCC was also set up to fight against corruption and protect the country from economic saboteurs. The current chairman of EFCC is Ola Olukoyede, appointed by President Bola Tinubu on 12 October 2023.

== History ==
The Economic and Financial Crimes Commission (EFCC) was established on December 12, 2002, by President Olusegun Obasanjo's administration to combat financial crimes and money laundering. The commission's creation was partly in response to pressure from the Financial Action Task Force (FATF) on Money Laundering, which had ranked Nigeria as one of 23 non-cooperative countries. However, on April 13, 2003, the EFCC commenced operational activities under Nuhu Ribadu as the pioneer Executive Chairman. Under Nuhu Ribadu, the agency addressed financial corruption by prosecuting and convicting a number of high-profile corrupt individuals, ranging from Nigeria's former chief law enforcement officer to several bank chief executives. By 2005, the EFCC arrested government officials including Diepreye Alamieyeseigha.

== Operations ==
In September 2006, the EFCC had 31 of Nigeria's 36 state governors under investigation for corruption. In December 2007, the Nigerian Federal Government, after extensive investigations by EFCC and other organisations, cleared the Vaswani Brothers of any wrongdoing and invited them back into the country. Leading Nigerian daily This Day and other major newspapers reported the facts of their clearance quoting text from FG issued directives. In April 2008, the EFCC began an investigation of the very influential daughter of a former Nigerian President, Senator Iyabo Obasanjo-Bello for receiving N10 million ($100,000), stolen from the Ministry of Health. The former Health Minister (Professor Adenike Grange) and her deputy were tried for stealing over N30,000,000 ($300,000) from the ministry's unspent funds from a year before.

On September 14, 2010, the head of the Forensic Unit of the EFCC, Abdullahi Muazu, was assassinated in Kaduna. He had been actively involved in the trials of several heads of banks.

On July 6, 2020, Magu was arrested by operatives of the State Security Service and the Nigeria Police Force and driven to the Aso Villa where he was made to answer questions on alleged corruption against him. He was detained overnight and on July 7 was suspended from his position as chairman of the agency pending the completion of the investigation.

On July 10, 2020, President Muhammadu Buhari approved the immediate suspension of Ibrahim Magu as acting chairman of the Economic and Financial Crimes Commission (EFCC) in a statement issued by the Office of the Attorney-General of the Federation, Abubakar Malami. President Muhammadu Buhari also approved that the EFCC Director of Operations, Mohammed Umar Abba, should take charge and oversee the activities of the Commission pending the conclusion of the ongoing investigation and further directives.

In October 2024, the chairman of the EFCC, Ola Olukoyede, has challenged religious leaders in Nigeria to be more committed to the fight against corruption by preaching the right messages.

== Geographic structure ==
The EFCC is structured into 16 zonal commands.

- Corporate Headquarters
- Abuja Zonal Command
- Benin Zonal Command
- Enugu Zonal Command
- Gombe Zonal Command
- Ibadan Zonal Command
- Ilorin Zonal Command
- Kaduna Zonal Command
- Kano Zonal Command
- Lagos Zonal Command
- Maiduguri Zonal Command
- Makurdi Zonal Command
- Port Harcourt Zonal Command
- Sokoto Zonal Command
- Uyo Zonal Command
- Ekiti Zonal Command

== Eagle Eye app ==
The Economic as Financial Crimes Commission launched an application on the 14th of July, 2021 called the "Eagle Eye App". The app was specifically crafted to simplify the process of reporting financial and economic crimes in Nigeria.

== EFCC Academy ==
Formerly known as the Training and Research Institute, the EFCC Academy was established in 2005 with the initial mandate of training and capacity development of the EFCC staff until 2012 when its role was expanded to other law enforcement agencies, security agencies and anti-corruption bodies within and outside Nigeria. The EFCC Academy is located in Karu, Abuja.
