= 2023 Borno State gubernatorial election =

2023 gubernatorial election in Borno State, Nigeria

- 18 March 2023
- Registered: 2,513,281
Nominee	Babagana Umara Zulum	Mohammed Ali Jajari
Party	APC	PDP
Running mate	Umar Usman Kadafur	Saleh Ahmed Kida
Popular vote	545,543	82,147
Percentage	86.10%	12.96%
Governor before election
Babagana Umara Zulum
APC
Elected Governor
Babagana Umara Zulum
APC

The 2023 Borno State gubernatorial election took place on 18 March 2023, to elect the Governor of Borno State, concurrent with elections to the Borno State House of Assembly as well as twenty-seven other gubernatorial elections and elections to all other state houses of assembly. The election—which was postponed from its original 11 March date—was held three weeks after the presidential election and National Assembly elections. Incumbent Governor Babagana Umara Zulum (APC) was re-elected by a 74% margin over PDP nominee — businessman Mohammed Ali Jajari.

The party primaries, scheduled for between 4 April and 9 June 2022, resulted in Zulum winning the All Progressives Congress primary unopposed on 26 May while the Peoples Democratic Party nominated businessman Mohammed Ali Jajari on 25 May.

On 20 March, collation completed and INEC declared Zulum as the winner. In total, Zulum won over 545,000 votes and 86% of the vote while runner-up Ali Jajari received about 82,000 votes and 13% of the vote.

== Electoral system ==
The Governor of Borno State is elected using a modified two-round system. To be elected in the first round, a candidate must receive the plurality of the vote and over 25% of the vote in at least two-thirds of state local government areas. If no candidate passes this threshold, a second round will be held between the top candidate and the next candidate to have received a plurality of votes in the highest number of local government areas.

== Background ==
Borno State is a northeastern state in the process of recovering from the Boko Haram insurgency. Still facing threats by and partial occupation from Boko Haram and ISWAP terrorists, the state also has to contend with an underdeveloped yet agricultural sector, desertification, and low education rates.

Politically, the 2019 elections confirmed the state's status as one of the most staunchly APC states in the nation as both Buhari and Zulum won the state by wide margins and every single legislative seat on the senatorial, house of representatives, and house of assembly levels were carried by APC nominees.

At the beginning of his term, Zulum said administration would focus on ending the insurgency, rebuilding the educational sector, creating jobs, and reconstructing abandoned communities. In terms of his performance, Zulum was praised for his outreach to Christian areas in the state's south that are heavily targeted by terrorists, the restoration of power to Bama, an early and proactive approach to the beginning of the COVID-19 pandemic, efforts to support internally displaced persons' return to their communities, and for signing the Child Protection Law but was criticized for ordering the reopening of schools in an insecure area, being insensitive in the aftermath of the Koshebe massacre, and rushing the closure of IDP camps before security could be guaranteed.

== Primary elections ==
The primaries, along with any potential challenges to primary results, were to take place between 4 April and 3 June 2022 but the deadline was extended to 9 June.

=== All Progressives Congress ===
On 20 April 2022, the APC National Executive Committee announced the party's schedule for gubernatorial primaries, setting its expression of interest form price at ₦10 million and nomination form price at ₦40 million with a 50% nomination form discount for candidates younger than 40 while women and candidates with disabilities get free nomination forms. Forms were to be sold from 26 April to 6 May until the deadline was later extended to 10 May then 12 May. After the submission of nomination forms by 13 May, candidates were screened by a party committee on 14 and 15 May while 16 May was the date for the screening appeal process. Ward congresses and LGA congresses were set for between 7 and 9 May to elect delegates for the primary. Candidates approved by the screening process advanced to a primary set for 26 May, in concurrence with other APC gubernatorial primaries; challenges to the result could be made the next day.

On the primary date, Zulum was the sole candidate and won the nomination unanimously at the El-Kanemi Sports Centre in Maiduguri. In his acceptance speech, Zulum noted that combating insecurity was a priority in the wake of the Kala-Balge killings; he also rejected his long-rumored interest in the APC's vice presidential slot.

==== Nominated ====
- Babagana Umara Zulum: Governor (2019–present) and former Commissioner of Reconstruction, Rehabilitation and Resettlement (2015–2018)
  - Running mate—Umar Usman Kadafur: Deputy Governor (2019–present)

==== Declined ====
- Mohammed Abba-Aji: Northeast Governors Forum Executive Secretary (2020–present) and former Senator for Borno Central (2003–2007)
- Kashim Ibrahim-Imam: 2019 APC gubernatorial candidate, 2003 and 2007 PDP gubernatorial nominee, and son of First Republic politician Ibrahim Imam
- Abubakar Kyari: APC Deputy National Chairman (North) (2022–present), Senator for Borno North (2015–2022), former commissioner, and son of former Military Administrator of North-Central State Abba Kyari
- Mohammed Ali Ndume: Senator for Borno South (2011–present) and former House of Representatives member for Chibok/Damboa/Gwoza (2003–2011)
- Idris Mamman Durkwa: 2019 APC gubernatorial candidate
- Mustapha Baba Shehuri: Minister of State for Agriculture and Rural Development (2019–present) and former Minister of State for Works, Power and Housing (2015–2019)

==== Results ====
APC primary results
Party	Candidate	Votes	%
APC	Babagana Umara Zulum	1,411	100.00%
Total votes		1,411	100.00%
Turnout		1,411	90.45%

=== People's Democratic Party ===
On 16 March 2022, the national PDP announced its gubernatorial primaries' schedule, setting its expression of interest form price at ₦1 million and the nomination form price at ₦20 million with a 50% discount for candidates between 25 and 30. Forms were to be sold until 1 April but the party later extended the deadline four times before reaching a final deadline of 22 April. After the submission of nomination forms by 25 April, candidates were screened by a party committee on 28 April while 2 May was the rescheduled date for the screening appeal process. Ward congresses were set for 29 April and LGA congresses were rescheduled for 10 May to elect delegates for the primary. Candidates approved by the screening process advanced to a primary set for 25 May, in concurrence with all other PDP gubernatorial primaries; challenges to the result could be made in the following days.

On the primary date, an indirect primary held in Maiduguri with that ended with Mohammed Ali Jajari emerging as the PDP nominee by defeating 2019 nominee Muhammed Imam, 57% to 43%. After announcing the results, primary committee chairman Abdulrahman Bobboi urged those that had lost out to commit their support to Ali Jajari.

==== Nominated ====
- Mohammed Ali Jajari: businessman
  - Running mate—Saleh Ahmed Kida

==== Eliminated in primary ====
- Muhammed Imam: 2019 PDP gubernatorial nominee

==== Results ====
Candidates' vote share
1. Mohammed Ali Jajari (57.4%)
2. Muhammed Imam (42.6%)

PDP primary results
Party	Candidate	Votes	%
PDP	Mohammed Ali Jajari	487	57.36%
PDP	Muhammed Imam	362	42.64%
Total votes		849	100.00%
Turnout		849	Unknown

=== Minor parties ===
- Buji Babagana (Action Alliance)
  - Running mate: Mohammed Abubakar
- Alhaji Monguno (Action Democratic Party)
  - Running mate: Hamid Zamzam Abbas
- Umar Abdulkadir (Action Peoples Party)
  - Running mate: Salihu Umar
- Fatima Abubakar (African Democratic Congress)
  - Running mate: Shettima Muhammad
- Musa Hassan (Allied Peoples Movement)
  - Running mate: Mayami Mustapha
- Kaka Goni Shettima (Boot Party)
  - Running mate: Bukar Mohammed
- Abdullahi Goni (Labour Party)
  - Running mate: Sanusi Salisu
- Mustapha Umar (National Rescue Movement)
  - Running mate: Yusuf Haruna
- Muhammad Bashir Maigawa (People's Redemption Party)
  - Running mate: Ali Gora Yakubu
- Modu Abba (Social Democratic Party)
  - Running mate: Fatima Lawan

== Campaign ==
In the months after the primaries, the campaign was dominated by questions over the ability of Ali Jajari to challenge the strong APC hold of the state. Coupled with the pro-APC leaning of the state were accusations that the incumbent administration was suppressing the opposition, most notably when the NNPP campaign office was closed in August by order of the Borno State Urban Planning and Development Board as it allegedly violated zoning laws. After the NNPP protested the closure, Zulum ordered the unbarring of the office with a statement that "no matter the justification [for the closure], the timing is wrong." By September, the PDP had begun expressing fears of electoral fraud while the APC dismissed the PDP and NNPP as parties without widespread support in the state.

By 2023, attention largely switched to the presidential election on 25 February. In the election, Borno State voted for Bola Tinubu (APC); Tinubu won 54.2% of the vote, beating Atiku Abubakar (PDP) at 41.0%. Although the result was unsurprising as Borno is the home state of Tinubu's running mate—Kashim Shettima—and projections had favored him, the totals led to increased attention on the gubernatorial race as it was a much slimmer APC margin of victory than in recent previous elections. Gubernatorial campaign analysis from after the presidential election noted the role of Ali Jajari in the state PDP's renewal while noting NNPP support among Shuwa Arab and Hausa communities in addition to LP support among Christian communities. Pundits also observed that the boost of APC incumbency had been counteracted by weak areas where unpopular APC legislative candidates could drag down Zulum's vote share. Nevertheless, the EiE-SBM forecast projected Zulum to win based on "quantitative data and the convincing party victory in the presidential vote" while a Vanguard piece predicted a Zulum "walk over."

== Projections ==
Source	Projection	As of
Africa Elects (Note: AfricaElects projections predict the likelihood of a candidate winning a state by categorizing a state as "Safe" for exceedingly likely, "Likely" for somewhat likely, and "Lean" for least likely. If no clear determination could be made, states are categorized as "tossups".)	Safe Zulum	17 March 2023
Enough is Enough- SBM Intelligence (Note: EiE-SBM projections predict which candidates will win states.)	Zulum	2 March 2023

== Conduct ==
=== Electoral timetable ===
On 26 February 2022, the Independent National Electoral Commission released the timetable, setting out key dates and deadlines for the election. Months later on 27 May 2022, INEC made a slight revision to the timetable, allowing parties extra time to conduct primaries.

- 28 February 2022 – Publication of Notice of Election
- 4 April 2022 – First day for the conduct of party primaries
- 9 June 2022 (Note: The original deadline was 3 June; however, INEC pushed it back to 9 June at the behest of parties.) – Final day for the conduct of party primaries, including the resolution of disputes arising from them
- 1 July 2022 – First day for submission of nomination forms to INEC via the online portal
- 15 July 2022 – Final day for submission of nomination forms to INEC via the online portal
- 12 October 2022 – Commencement of the official campaign period
- 16 March 2023 (Note: The original deadline was 9 March; however, INEC pushed it back to 16 March.) – Final day of the official campaign period

== General election ==
=== Results ===
2023 Borno State gubernatorial election
Party	Candidate	Votes	%
A			
AA			
ADP			
APP			
AAC			
ADC			
APM			
APC			
APGA			
BP			
LP			
New Nigeria Peoples Party			
NRM			
PDP			
PRP			
SDP			
YPP			
ZLP			
Total votes			100.00%
Turnout			

==== By senatorial district ====
The results of the election by senatorial district.

Senatorial District	Babagana Umara Zulum APC		Mohammed Ali Jajari PDP		Others		Total Valid Votes
Senatorial District	Votes	Percentage	Votes	Percentage	Votes	Percentage	Total Valid Votes
Borno Central Senatorial District (Note: Comprising the local government areas of Bama, Dikwa, Jere, Kaga, Kala/Balge, Konduga, Mafa, Maiduguri, and Ngala.)	TBD	%	TBD	%	TBD	%	TBD
Borno North Senatorial District (Note: Comprising the local government areas of Abadam, Gubio, Guzamala, Kukawa, Magumeri, Marte, Mobbar, Monguno, and Nganzai.)	TBD	%	TBD	%	TBD	%	TBD
Borno South Senatorial District (Note: Comprising the local government areas of Askira/Uba, Bayo, Biu, Chibok, Damboa, Gwoza, Hawul, Kwaya Kusar, and Shani.)	TBD	%	TBD	%	TBD	%	TBD
Totals	TBD	%	TBD	%	TBD	%	TBD

==== By federal constituency ====
The results of the election by federal constituency.

Federal Constituency	Babagana Umara Zulum APC		Mohammed Ali Jajari PDP		Others		Total Valid Votes
Federal Constituency	Votes	Percentage	Votes	Percentage	Votes	Percentage	Total Valid Votes
Askira-Uba/Hawul Federal Constituency (Note: Comprising the local government areas of Askira/Uba and Hawul.)	TBD	%	TBD	%	TBD	%	TBD
Bama/Ngala/Kala-Balge Federal Constituency (Note: Comprising the local government areas of Bama, Kala/Balge, and Ngala.)	TBD	%	TBD	%	TBD	%	TBD
Biu/Kwaya Kusar/Shani/Bayo Federal Constituency (Note: Comprising the local government areas of Bayo, Biu, Kwaya Kusar, and Shani.)	TBD	%	TBD	%	TBD	%	TBD
Chibok/Damboa/Gwoza Federal Constituency (Note: Comprising the local government areas of Chibok, Damboa, and Gwoza.)	TBD	%	TBD	%	TBD	%	TBD
Dikwa/Mafa/Konduga Federal Constituency (Note: Comprising the local government areas of Dikwa, Konduga, and Mafa.)	TBD	%	TBD	%	TBD	%	TBD
Gubio/Kaga/Magumeri Federal Constituency (Note: Comprising the local government areas of Gubio, Kaga, and Magumeri.)	TBD	%	TBD	%	TBD	%	TBD
Jere Federal Constituency (Note: Comprising the local government areas of Jere.)	TBD	%	TBD	%	TBD	%	TBD
Kukawa/Mobbar/Abadam/Guzamala Federal Constituency (Note: Comprising the local government areas of Abadam, Guzamala, Kukawa, and Mobbar.)	TBD	%	TBD	%	TBD	%	TBD
Maiduguri (Metropolitan) Federal Constituency (Note: Comprising the local government area of Maiduguri.)	TBD	%	TBD	%	TBD	%	TBD
Monguno/Marte/Nganzai Federal Constituency (Note: Comprising the local government areas of Monguno.)	TBD	%	TBD	%	TBD	%	TBD
Totals	TBD	%	TBD	%	TBD	%	TBD

==== By local government area ====
The results of the election by local government area.

LGA	Babagana Umara Zulum APC		Mohammed Ali Jajari PDP		Others		Total Valid Votes	Turnout Percentage
LGA	Votes	Percentage	Votes	Percentage	Votes	Percentage	Total Valid Votes	Turnout Percentage
Abadam	TBD	%	TBD	%	TBD	%	TBD	%
Askira/Uba	TBD	%	TBD	%	TBD	%	TBD	%
Bama	TBD	%	TBD	%	TBD	%	TBD	%
Bayo	TBD	%	TBD	%	TBD	%	TBD	%
Biu	TBD	%	TBD	%	TBD	%	TBD	%
Chibok	TBD	%	TBD	%	TBD	%	TBD	%
Damboa	TBD	%	TBD	%	TBD	%	TBD	%
Dikwa	TBD	%	TBD	%	TBD	%	TBD	%
Gubio	TBD	%	TBD	%	TBD	%	TBD	%
Guzamala	TBD	%	TBD	%	TBD	%	TBD	%
Gwoza	TBD	%	TBD	%	TBD	%	TBD	%
Hawul	TBD	%	TBD	%	TBD	%	TBD	%
Jere	TBD	%	TBD	%	TBD	%	TBD	%
Kaga	TBD	%	TBD	%	TBD	%	TBD	%
Kala/Balge	TBD	%	TBD	%	TBD	%	TBD	%
Kukawa	TBD	%	TBD	%	TBD	%	TBD	%
Kwaya Kusar	TBD	%	TBD	%	TBD	%	TBD	%
Mafa	TBD	%	TBD	%	TBD	%	TBD	%
Magumeri	TBD	%	TBD	%	TBD	%	TBD	%
Maiduguri	TBD	%	TBD	%	TBD	%	TBD	%
Marte	TBD	%	TBD	%	TBD	%	TBD	%
Mobbar	TBD	%	TBD	%	TBD	%	TBD	%
Monguno	TBD	%	TBD	%	TBD	%	TBD	%
Ngala	TBD	%	TBD	%	TBD	%	TBD	%
Nganzai	TBD	%	TBD	%	TBD	%	TBD	%
Shani	TBD	%	TBD	%	TBD	%	TBD	%
Totals	TBD	%	TBD	%	TBD	%	TBD	%

== See also ==
- 2023 Nigerian elections
- 2023 Nigerian gubernatorial elections
