= 2023 Nigerian Senate elections in Borno State =

2023 Senate elections in Borno

- 25 February 2023

All 3 Borno State seats in the Senate of Nigeria
	Majority party
Party	APC
Last election	3
Seats before	2
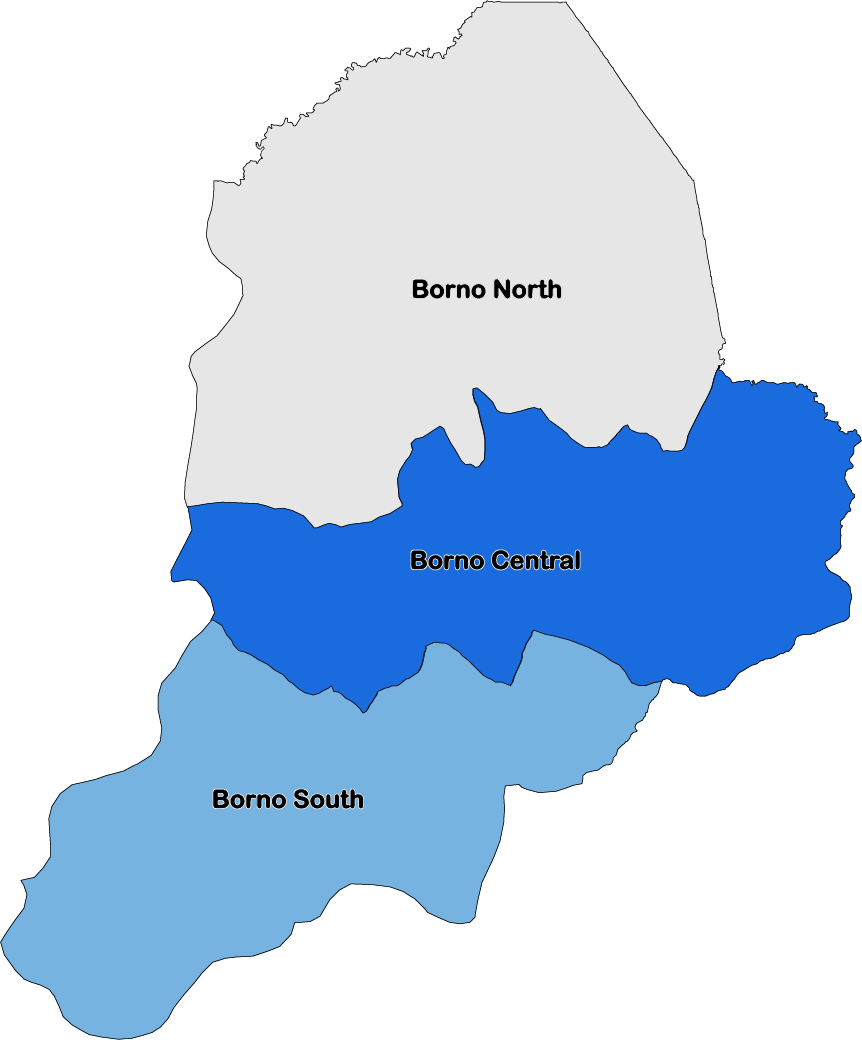
- APC incumbent retiring APC incumbent running for re-election Vacant

The 2023 Nigerian Senate elections in Borno State will be held on 25 February 2023, to elect the 3 federal Senators from Borno State, one from each of the state's three senatorial districts. The elections will coincide with the 2023 presidential election, as well as other elections to the Senate and elections to the House of Representatives; with state elections being held two weeks later. Primaries were held between 4 April and 9 June 2022.

== Background ==
In the previous Senate elections, two of the three incumbent senators were returned with APC senators Abubakar Kyari (North) and Mohammed Ali Ndume (South) winning re-election but Baba Kaka Bashir Garbai (APC-Central) retired. In the Central district, Kashim Shettima retained the seat for the APC with 81% of the vote; Kyari was re-elected with 68% in the North district while Ndume won with 76% in the South district. These results were a part of an APC sweep of Borno elections as both Buhari and gubernatorial nominee Babagana Umara Zulum won the state by wide margins and every single legislative seat in the House of Representatives and State House of Assembly levels were carried by APC nominees.

In April 2022, Kyari resigned from the Senate to focus on his new position as APC Deputy National Chairman (North) while in June of the same year, Shettima was picked as the APC vice presidential nominee.

== Overview ==
Affiliation	Party		Total
Affiliation	APC	Vacant	Total
Previous Election	3	0	3
Before Election	2	1 (Note: The seat of Borno North is vacant due to the April 2022 resignation of Senator Abubakar Kyari.)	3
After Election	TBD	TBD	3

== Summary ==
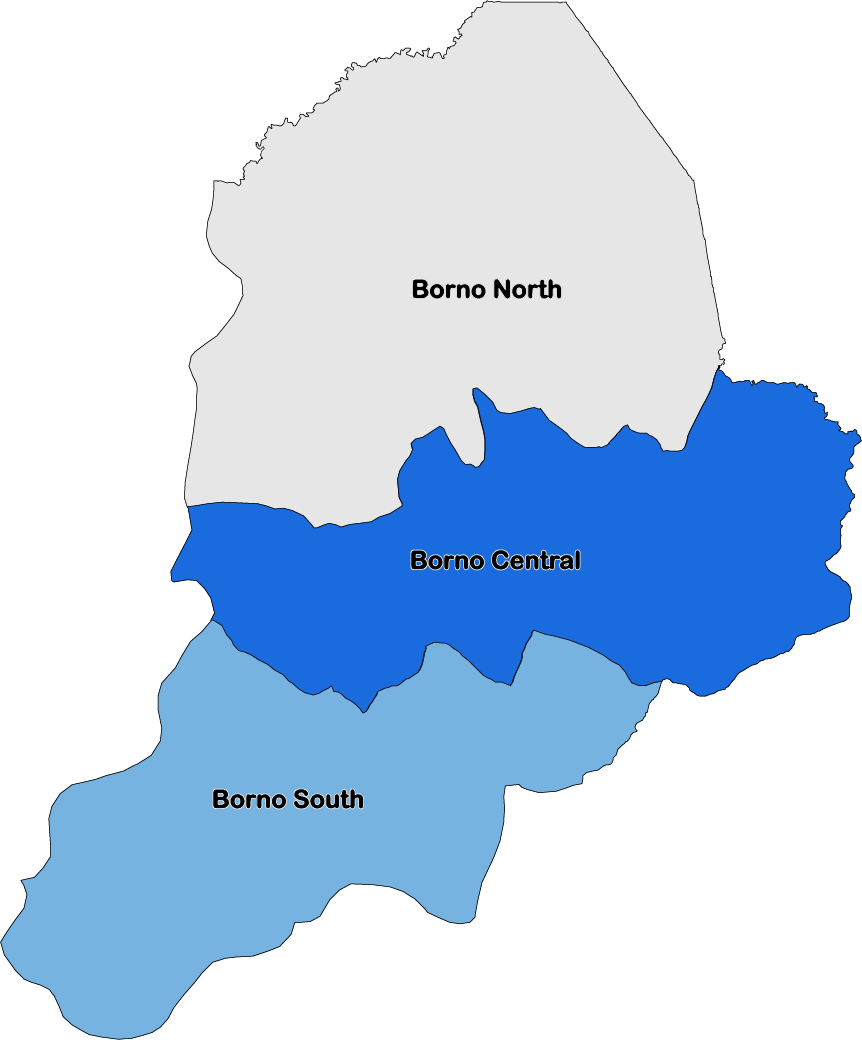
APC incumbent retiring APC incumbent running Vacant

District	Incumbent		Results	
District	Incumbent	Party	Status	Candidates
Borno Central	Kashim Shettima	APC	Incumbent withdrew from nomination New member elected APC gain	▌ ✓ Shehu Lawan (APC); ▌Mohammed Umara Kumalia (PDP)
Borno North	Vacant		New member elected APC gain	▌ ✓ Mohammed Tahir Monguno (APC); ▌Isa Lawan (PDP)
Borno South	Mohammed Ali Ndume	APC	Incumbent re-elected	▌ ✓ Mohammed Ali Ndume (APC); ▌Kudla Milinda Satumari (PDP)

== Borno Central ==
2023 Borno Central Senatorial District election
- 25 February 2023
Nominee	Kaka Shehu Lawan	Mohammed Umara Kumalia
Party	APC	PDP
Senator before election
Kashim Shettima
APC
Elected Senator
To be determined
To be determined

The Borno Central district covers the local government areas of Bama, Dikwa, Jere, Kaga, Kala/Balge, Konduga, Mafa, Maiduguri, and Ngala. The incumbent Kashim Shettima (APC), who was elected with 80.9% of the vote in 2019, initially sought re-election and was renominated by his party but withdrew from the nomination to become the APC nominee for vice president.

=== Primary elections ===
==== All Progressives Congress ====
On 20 April 2022, the APC National Executive Committee announced the party's schedule for senatorial primaries, setting its expression of interest form price at ₦3 million and nomination form price at ₦17 million with a 50% discount for candidates younger than 40 while women and candidates with disabilities get free nomination forms. Forms were to be sold from 26 April to 6 May until the deadline was later extended to 10 May then 12 May. After the submission of nomination forms by 13 May, candidates were screened by a party committee on 14 and 15 May while 18 May was the date for the screening appeal process. Ward congresses and LGA congresses were set for 16 and 17 May to elect delegates for the primary. Candidates approved by the screening process advanced to a primary set for 27 May, in concurrence with other APC senatorial primaries; challenges to the result could be made on 28 May.

Shettima was renominated unopposed in the primary at the state APC secretariat in Maiduguri. However, in the weeks after the primary, Shettima was named by pundits as a potential vice presidential running mate for APC presidential nominee Bola Tinubu. These rumours were confirmed on 10 July when Tinubu announced Shettima as his running mate. After Shettima relinquished his senatorial nomination, a new primary was held in Maiduguri with Kaka Shehu Lawan—the former state Attorney-General and Commissioner of Justice—winning unopposed. In his acceptance speech, Lawan thanked Governor Babagana Umara Zulum, hailed Shettima, and vowed to properly represent the district.

Original primary results

APC primary results
Party	Candidate	Votes	%
APC	Kashim Shettima	479	100.00%
Total votes		479	100.00%
Invalid or blank votes		1	N/A
Turnout		480	Unknown

APC rerun primary results
Party	Candidate	Votes	%
APC	Kaka Shehu Lawan	459	100.00%
Total votes		459	100.00%
Invalid or blank votes		21	N/A
Turnout		480	Unknown

==== People's Democratic Party ====
On 16 March 2022, the national PDP announced its senatorial primary timetable, setting its expression of interest form price at ₦1 million and the nomination form price at ₦20 million with a 50% discount for candidates between 25 and 30. Forms were to be sold until 1 April but the party later extended the deadline four times before reaching a final deadline of 22 April. After the submission of nomination forms by 25 April, candidates were screened by a party committee on 27 April while 2 May was the rescheduled date for the screening appeal process. Ward congresses were set for 29 April and LGA congresses were rescheduled for 10 May to elect delegates for the primary. Candidates approved by the screening process advanced to a primary set for 23 May, in concurrence with other PDP senatorial primaries but due to often violently enforced Monday stay-at-home orders by separatists, southeastern state parties held their primaries on 24 May; challenges to the result could be made on 25 May.

Although Jibrin Mustapha Tatabe won the initial primary, former MHR Mohammed Umara Kumalia's name was listed as nominee amid an alleged substitution plot. In response, the APC went to court to challenge Umara Kumalia's candidacy leading to an early January 2023 ruling from Federal High Court judge Jude K. Dagat that barred Umara Kumalia from the nomination due to his illegal nominating process. However, the decision was overturned by a Court of Appeal ruling a few days before the election.

PDP primary results
Party	Candidate	Votes	%
PDP	Jibrin Mustapha Tatabe	244	84.72%
PDP	Bukar Kachallah	44	15.28%
Total votes		288	100.00%

=== General election ===
==== Results ====
2023 Borno Central Senatorial District election
Party	Candidate	Votes	%
A	Maryam Tijani		
AA	Mohamed Saleh Moulud		
ADP	Mohammed Manga Tijani		
APP	Abdulkadir Fema		
ADC	Sheriff Muhammed		
APC	Kaka Shehu Lawan		
NRM	Mustapha Tijjani		
New Nigeria Peoples Party	Attom Magira Tom		
PDP	Mohammed Umara Kumalia		
SDP	Zanna Shettima Wuroma		
Total votes			100.00%
Invalid or blank votes			N/A
Turnout			

== Borno North ==
2023 Borno North Senatorial District election
- 25 February 2023
Nominee	Mohammed Tahir Monguno	Isa Lawan
Party	APC	PDP
Senator before election
Vacant
Elected Senator
To be determined
To be determined

The Borno North district covers the local government areas of Abadam, Gubio, Guzamala, Kukawa, Magumeri, Marte, Mobbar, Monguno, and Nganzai. The seat is vacant as Senator Abubakar Kyari (APC), who was elected with 67.7% of the vote in 2019, resigned from the Senate on 12 April 2022 to focus on his new position as APC Deputy National Chairman (North). Despite a constitutional stipulation that by-elections must be held after a vacancy, INEC did not schedule a by-election amid its preparations for prescheduled elections in 2022 and 2023.

=== Primary elections ===
==== All Progressives Congress ====
On 20 April 2022, the APC National Executive Committee announced the party's schedule for senatorial primaries, setting its expression of interest form price at ₦3 million and nomination form price at ₦17 million with a 50% discount for candidates younger than 40 while women and candidates with disabilities get free nomination forms. Forms were to be sold from 26 April to 6 May until the deadline was later extended to 10 May then 12 May. After the submission of nomination forms by 13 May, candidates were screened by a party committee on 14 and 15 May while 18 May was the date for the screening appeal process. Ward congresses and LGA congresses were set for 16 and 17 May to elect delegates for the primary. Candidates approved by the screening process advanced to a primary set for 27 May, in concurrence with other APC senatorial primaries; challenges to the result could be made on 28 May.

On the primary date, Mohammed Tahir Monguno—MHR for Monguno/Marte/Nganzai—was the sole candidate and was nominated unopposed at the primary.

==== People's Democratic Party ====
On 16 March 2022, the national PDP announced its senatorial primary timetable, setting its expression of interest form price at ₦1 million and the nomination form price at ₦20 million with a 50% discount for candidates between 25 and 30. Forms were to be sold until 1 April but the party later extended the deadline four times before reaching a final deadline of 22 April. After the submission of nomination forms by 25 April, candidates were screened by a party committee on 27 April while 2 May was the rescheduled date for the screening appeal process. Ward congresses were set for 29 April and LGA congresses were rescheduled for 10 May to elect delegates for the primary. Candidates approved by the screening process advanced to a primary set for 23 May, in concurrence with other PDP senatorial primaries but due to often violently enforced Monday stay-at-home orders by separatists, southeastern state parties held their primaries on 24 May; challenges to the result could be made on 25 May.

=== General election ===
==== Results ====
2023 Borno North Senatorial District election
Party	Candidate	Votes	%
APP	Gambo Abatcha		
ADC	Abubakar Mohammed Alhashim		
APC	Mohammed Tahir Monguno		
NRM	Bukar Mustapha		
New Nigeria Peoples Party	Amos Dawa		
PDP	Isa Lawan		
SDP	Modu Babagana Kura		
Total votes			100.00%
Invalid or blank votes			N/A
Turnout			

== Borno South ==
2023 Borno South Senatorial District election
- 25 February 2023
Nominee	Mohammed Ali Ndume	Kudla Milinda Satumari
Party	APC	PDP
Senator before election
Mohammed Ali Ndume
APC
Elected Senator
To be determined
To be determined

The Borno South district covers the local government areas of Askira/Uba, Bayo, Biu, Chibok, Damboa, Gwoza, Hawul, Kwaya Kusar, and Shani. The incumbent Mohammed Ali Ndume (APC), who was re-elected with 75.5% of the vote in 2019, is seeking re-election.

=== Primary elections ===
==== All Progressives Congress ====
On 20 April 2022, the APC National Executive Committee announced the party's schedule for senatorial primaries, setting its expression of interest form price at ₦3 million and nomination form price at ₦17 million with a 50% discount for candidates younger than 40 while women and candidates with disabilities get free nomination forms. Forms were to be sold from 26 April to 6 May until the deadline was later extended to 10 May then 12 May. After the submission of nomination forms by 13 May, candidates were screened by a party committee on 14 and 15 May while 18 May was the date for the screening appeal process. Ward congresses and LGA congresses were set for 16 and 17 May to elect delegates for the primary. Candidates approved by the screening process advanced to a primary set for 27 May, in concurrence with other APC senatorial primaries; challenges to the result could be made on 28 May.

On the primary date, Ndume was the sole candidate and was nominated unopposed at the primary.

==== People's Democratic Party ====
On 16 March 2022, the national PDP announced its senatorial primary timetable, setting its expression of interest form price at ₦1 million and the nomination form price at ₦20 million with a 50% discount for candidates between 25 and 30. Forms were to be sold until 1 April but the party later extended the deadline four times before reaching a final deadline of 22 April. After the submission of nomination forms by 25 April, candidates were screened by a party committee on 27 April while 2 May was the rescheduled date for the screening appeal process. Ward congresses were set for 29 April and LGA congresses were rescheduled for 10 May to elect delegates for the primary. Candidates approved by the screening process advanced to a primary set for 23 May, in concurrence with other PDP senatorial primaries but due to often violently enforced Monday stay-at-home orders by separatists, southeastern state parties held their primaries on 24 May; challenges to the result could be made on 25 May.

=== Campaign ===
Campaign analysis from December 2022 pointed out Satumari's focus on power rotation as only natives of Gwoza had occupied the senate seat since the return of democracy in 1999; for the APC, pundits noted Ndume's longtime political power and electoral history.

=== General election ===
==== Results ====
2023 Borno South Senatorial District election
Party	Candidate	Votes	%
APP	Musa Galadima		
AAC	John Usman		
ADC	Paul Andrew		
APC	Mohammed Ali Ndume		
NRM	Abdulaziz Umar		
New Nigeria Peoples Party	Stanley Dika Ngada		
PRP	John Mark Bwala		
PDP	Kudla Milinda Satumari		
SDP	Audu Haruna		
Total votes			100.00%
Invalid or blank votes			N/A
Turnout			

== See also ==
- 2023 Nigerian Senate election
- 2023 Nigerian elections
