= 2023 Nigerian presidential election in Borno State =

- 25 February 2023
- Registered: 2,513,281
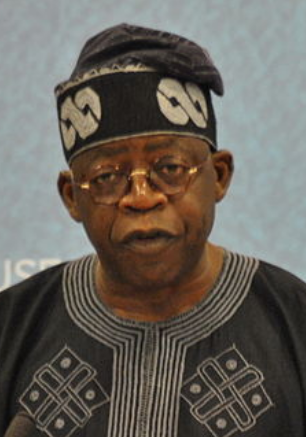

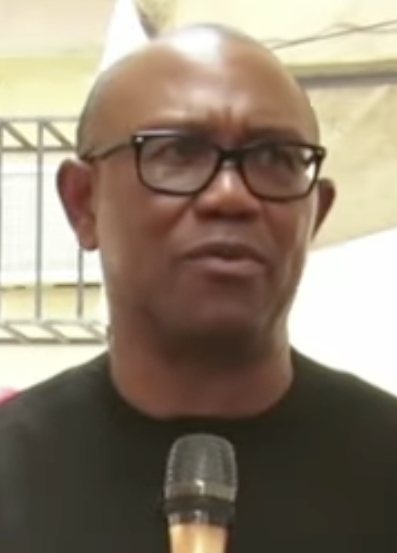

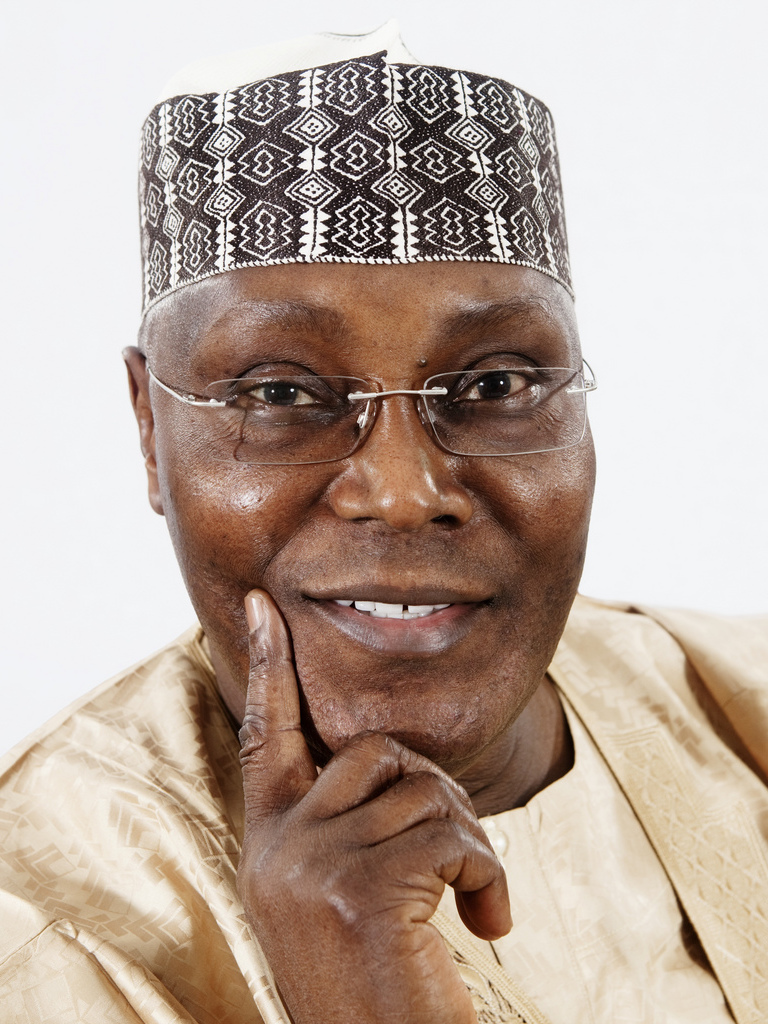
| Nominee | Bola Tinubu | Peter Obi |
| Party | APC | LP |
| Home state | Lagos | Anambra |
| Running mate | Kashim Shettima | Yusuf Datti Baba-Ahmed |
| Nominee | Rabiu Kwankwaso | Atiku Abubakar |
| Party | New Nigeria Peoples Party | PDP |
| Home state | Kano | Adamawa |
| Running mate | Isaac Idahosa | Ifeanyi Okowa |
President before election
Muhammadu Buhari
APC
Elected President
TBD

The 2023 Nigerian presidential election in Borno State will be held on 25 February 2023 as part of the nationwide 2023 Nigerian presidential election to elect the president and vice president of Nigeria. Other federal elections, including elections to the House of Representatives and the Senate, will also be held on the same date while state elections will be held two weeks afterward on 11 March.

== Background ==
Borno State is a large, diverse northeastern state in the process of recovering from the worst of the Boko Haram insurgency. Still facing large-scale threats by and partial occupation from Boko Haram and ISWAP terrorists, the state also has to contend with an underdeveloped yet vital agricultural sector, desertification, and low education rates. Politically, the 2019 elections confirmed the state's status as one of the most staunchly APC states in the nation as both Buhari and APC gubernatorial nominee Babagana Umara Zulum won the state by wide margins and every single legislative seat on the senatorial, house of representatives, and house of assembly levels were carried by APC nominees.

== Polling ==
| Polling organisation/client | Fieldwork date | Sample size | | | | | Others | Undecided | Undisclosed | Not voting |
| Polling organisation/client | Fieldwork date | Sample size | Tinubu APC | Obi LP | Kwankwaso NNPP | Abubakar PDP | Others | Undecided | Undisclosed | Not voting |
|---|---|---|---|---|---|---|---|---|---|---|
| Nextier (Borno crosstabs of national poll) | 27 January 2023 | N/A | 62.9% | 32.6% | 3.4% | 1.1% | – | – | – | – |
| SBM Intelligence for EiE (Borno crosstabs of national poll) | 22 January-6 February 2023 | N/A | 24% | 10% | 2% | 42% | 3% | 20% | – | – |

== Projections ==
| Source | Projection | | As of |
|---|---|---|---|
| Africa Elects (Note: AfricaElects projections predict the likelihood of a candidate winning a state by categorizing a state as "Safe" for exceedingly likely, "Likely" for somewhat likely, and "Lean" for least likely. If no clear determination could be made, states are categorized as "tossups".) | Safe Tinubu | | 24 February 2023 |
Dataphyte (Note: Dataphyte projections predict candidates' projected votal shares in each state.)
| Dataphyte | Tinubu: | 45.37% | 11 February 2023 |
| Dataphyte | Obi: | 4.95% | 11 February 2023 |
| Dataphyte | Abubakar: | 45.37% | 11 February 2023 |
| Dataphyte | Others: | 4.32% | 11 February 2023 |
| Enough is Enough- SBM Intelligence (Note: EiE-SBM projections predict which candidates will win states.) | Abubakar | | 17 February 2023 |
| SBM Intelligence (Note: SBM projections predict which candidates will win states or, if no determination could be made, categorizes states as "Too close to call" (TCC).) | Tinubu | | 15 December 2022 |
ThisDay (Note: ThisDay projections predict candidates' projected votal shares in each state.)
| ThisDay | Tinubu: | 40% | 27 December 2022 |
| ThisDay | Obi: | – | 27 December 2022 |
| ThisDay | Kwankwaso: | 20% | 27 December 2022 |
| ThisDay | Abubakar: | 35% | 27 December 2022 |
| ThisDay | Others/Undecided: | 5% | 27 December 2022 |
| The Nation (Note: The Nation projections predict which candidates will win states or, if no determination could be made, categorizes states as "Battlegrounds.") | Tinubu | | 12-19 February 2023 |

== General election ==
=== Results ===
2023 Nigerian presidential election in Borno State
| Party | Candidate | Votes | % |
|---|---|---|---|
| A | Christopher Imumolen | | |
| AA | Hamza al-Mustapha | | |
| ADP | Yabagi Sani | | |
| APP | Osita Nnadi | | |
| AAC | Omoyele Sowore | | |
| ADC | Dumebi Kachikwu | | |
| APC | Bola Tinubu | | |
| APGA | Peter Umeadi | | |
| APM | Princess Chichi Ojei | | |
| BP | Sunday Adenuga | | |
| LP | Peter Obi | | |
| NRM | Felix Johnson Osakwe | | |
| New Nigeria Peoples Party | Rabiu Kwankwaso | | |
| PRP | Kola Abiola | | |
| PDP | Atiku Abubakar | | |
| SDP | Adewole Adebayo | | |
| YPP | Malik Ado-Ibrahim | | |
| ZLP | Dan Nwanyanwu | | |
| Total votes | | | 100.00% |
| Invalid or blank votes | | | N/A |
| Turnout | | | |

==== By senatorial district ====
The results of the election by senatorial district.

| Senatorial district | Bola Tinubu APC | | Atiku Abubakar PDP | | Peter Obi LP | | Rabiu Kwankwaso NNPP | | Others | | Total valid votes |
| Senatorial district | Votes | % | Votes | % | Votes | % | Votes | % | Votes | % | Total valid votes |
|---|---|---|---|---|---|---|---|---|---|---|---|
| Borno Central Senatorial District (Note: Comprising the local government areas of Bama, Dikwa, Jere, Kaga, Kala/Balge, Konduga, Mafa, Maiduguri, and Ngala.) | TBD | % | TBD | % | TBD | % | TBD | % | TBD | % | TBD |
| Borno North Senatorial District (Note: Comprising the local government areas of Abadam, Gubio, Guzamala, Kukawa, Magumeri, Marte, Mobbar, Monguno, and Nganzai.) | TBD | % | TBD | % | TBD | % | TBD | % | TBD | % | TBD |
| Borno South Senatorial District (Note: Comprising the local government areas of Askira/Uba, Bayo, Biu, Chibok, Damboa, Gwoza, Hawul, Kwaya Kusar, and Shani.) | TBD | % | TBD | % | TBD | % | TBD | % | TBD | % | TBD |
| Totals | TBD | % | TBD | % | TBD | % | TBD | % | TBD | % | TBD |

==== By federal constituency ====
The results of the election by federal constituency.

| Federal constituency | Bola Tinubu APC | | Atiku Abubakar PDP | | Peter Obi LP | | Rabiu Kwankwaso NNPP | | Others | | Total valid votes |
| Federal constituency | Votes | % | Votes | % | Votes | % | Votes | % | Votes | % | Total valid votes |
|---|---|---|---|---|---|---|---|---|---|---|---|
| Askira-Uba/Hawul Federal Constituency (Note: Comprising the local government areas of Askira/Uba and Hawul.) | TBD | % | TBD | % | TBD | % | TBD | % | TBD | % | TBD |
| Bama/Ngala/Kala-Balge Federal Constituency (Note: Comprising the local government areas of Bama, Kala/Balge, and Ngala.) | TBD | % | TBD | % | TBD | % | TBD | % | TBD | % | TBD |
| Biu/Kwaya Kusar/Shani/Bayo Federal Constituency (Note: Comprising the local government areas of Bayo, Biu, Kwaya Kusar, and Shani.) | TBD | % | TBD | % | TBD | % | TBD | % | TBD | % | TBD |
| Chibok/Damboa/Gwoza Federal Constituency (Note: Comprising the local government areas of Chibok, Damboa, and Gwoza.) | TBD | % | TBD | % | TBD | % | TBD | % | TBD | % | TBD |
| Dikwa/Mafa/Konduga Federal Constituency (Note: Comprising the local government areas of Dikwa, Konduga, and Mafa.) | TBD | % | TBD | % | TBD | % | TBD | % | TBD | % | TBD |
| Gubio/Kaga/Magumeri Federal Constituency (Note: Comprising the local government areas of Gubio, Kaga, and Magumeri.) | TBD | % | TBD | % | TBD | % | TBD | % | TBD | % | TBD |
| Jere Federal Constituency (Note: Comprising the local government areas of Jere.) | TBD | % | TBD | % | TBD | % | TBD | % | TBD | % | TBD |
| Kukawa/Mobbar/Abadam/Guzamala Federal Constituency (Note: Comprising the local government areas of Abadam, Guzamala, Kukawa, and Mobbar.) | TBD | % | TBD | % | TBD | % | TBD | % | TBD | % | TBD |
| Maiduguri (Metropolitan) Federal Constituency (Note: Comprising the local government area of Maiduguri.) | TBD | % | TBD | % | TBD | % | TBD | % | TBD | % | TBD |
| Monguno/Marte/Nganzai Federal Constituency (Note: Comprising the local government areas of Monguno.) | TBD | % | TBD | % | TBD | % | TBD | % | TBD | % | TBD |
| Totals | TBD | % | TBD | % | TBD | % | TBD | % | TBD | % | TBD |

==== By local government area ====
The results of the election by local government area.

| Local government area | Bola Tinubu APC | | Atiku Abubakar PDP | | Peter Obi LP | | Rabiu Kwankwaso NNPP | | Others | | Total valid votes | Turnout (%) |
| Local government area | Votes | % | Votes | % | Votes | % | Votes | % | Votes | % | Total valid votes | Turnout (%) |
|---|---|---|---|---|---|---|---|---|---|---|---|---|
| Abadam | TBD | % | TBD | % | TBD | % | TBD | % | TBD | % | TBD | % |
| Askira/Uba | TBD | % | TBD | % | TBD | % | TBD | % | TBD | % | TBD | % |
| Bama | TBD | % | TBD | % | TBD | % | TBD | % | TBD | % | TBD | % |
| Bayo | TBD | % | TBD | % | TBD | % | TBD | % | TBD | % | TBD | % |
| Biu | TBD | % | TBD | % | TBD | % | TBD | % | TBD | % | TBD | % |
| Chibok | TBD | % | TBD | % | TBD | % | TBD | % | TBD | % | TBD | % |
| Damboa | TBD | % | TBD | % | TBD | % | TBD | % | TBD | % | TBD | % |
| Dikwa | TBD | % | TBD | % | TBD | % | TBD | % | TBD | % | TBD | % |
| Gubio | TBD | % | TBD | % | TBD | % | TBD | % | TBD | % | TBD | % |
| Guzamala | TBD | % | TBD | % | TBD | % | TBD | % | TBD | % | TBD | % |
| Gwoza | TBD | % | TBD | % | TBD | % | TBD | % | TBD | % | TBD | % |
| Hawul | TBD | % | TBD | % | TBD | % | TBD | % | TBD | % | TBD | % |
| Jere | TBD | % | TBD | % | TBD | % | TBD | % | TBD | % | TBD | % |
| Kaga | TBD | % | TBD | % | TBD | % | TBD | % | TBD | % | TBD | % |
| Kala/Balge | TBD | % | TBD | % | TBD | % | TBD | % | TBD | % | TBD | % |
| Kukawa | TBD | % | TBD | % | TBD | % | TBD | % | TBD | % | TBD | % |
| Kwaya Kusar | TBD | % | TBD | % | TBD | % | TBD | % | TBD | % | TBD | % |
| Mafa | TBD | % | TBD | % | TBD | % | TBD | % | TBD | % | TBD | % |
| Magumeri | TBD | % | TBD | % | TBD | % | TBD | % | TBD | % | TBD | % |
| Maiduguri | TBD | % | TBD | % | TBD | % | TBD | % | TBD | % | TBD | % |
| Marte | TBD | % | TBD | % | TBD | % | TBD | % | TBD | % | TBD | % |
| Mobbar | TBD | % | TBD | % | TBD | % | TBD | % | TBD | % | TBD | % |
| Monguno | TBD | % | TBD | % | TBD | % | TBD | % | TBD | % | TBD | % |
| Ngala | TBD | % | TBD | % | TBD | % | TBD | % | TBD | % | TBD | % |
| Nganzai | TBD | % | TBD | % | TBD | % | TBD | % | TBD | % | TBD | % |
| Shani | TBD | % | TBD | % | TBD | % | TBD | % | TBD | % | TBD | % |
| Totals | TBD | % | TBD | % | TBD | % | TBD | % | TBD | % | TBD | % |

== See also ==
- 2023 Borno State elections
- 2023 Nigerian presidential election
