= 2019 Borno State gubernatorial election =

2019 gubernatorial election in Borno State, Nigeria

- March 9, 2019
Nominee	Babagana Umara Zulum	Mohammad Imam
Party	APC	PDP
Running mate	Umar Usman Kadafur	Buba Haruna Biu
Popular vote	1,175,440	66,115
Governor before election
Kashim Shettima
APC
Elected Governor
Babagana Umara Zulum
APC

The 2019 Borno State gubernatorial election occurred on March 9, 2019, the APC nominee Babagana Umara Zulum won the election, defeating Mohammad Imam of the PDP.

Babagana Umara Zulum emerged APC gubernatorial candidate after scoring 4,432 votes and defeating his closest rival, Idris Durkwa, who received 115 votes. He picked Umar Usman Kadafur as his running mate. Mohammad Imam was the PDP candidate with Buba Haruna Biu as his running mate. 32 candidates contested in the election.

== Electoral system ==
The Governor of Borno is elected using the plurality voting system.

== Primary election ==
=== APC primary ===
The APC primary election was held on September 30, 2018. Babagana Umara Zulum won the primary election polling 4,432 votes against 9 other candidates. His closest rival was Idris Durkwa, who came a distant second with 115 votes, while Kashim Imam came third with 20 votes.

=== Candidates ===
- Party nominee: Babagana Umara Zulum: former commissioner for reconstruction, rehabilitation and resettlement
- Running mate: Umar Usman Kadafur
- Idris Durkwa
- Kashim Imam
- Gambo Lawan
- Atom Magira
- Mustapha Shehuri
- Baba Ahmed Jidda: Nigeria ambassador to China
- Umara Kumalia
- Umar Alkali
- Abba Jato

=== PDP primary ===
The PDP primary election was held on September 30, 2018. Mohammad Iman won the primary election polling 2,785 votes against 2 other candidates. His closest rival was Kyari Abba Bukar came second with 52 votes, while Mohammed Wakil came third with 20 votes.

=== Candidates ===
- Party nominee: Mohammad Imam
- Running mate: Buba Haruna Biu
- Kyari Abba Bukar
- Mohammed Wakil

== Results ==
A total number of 32 candidates registered with the Independent National Electoral Commission to contest in the election.

The total number of registered voters in the state was 2,316,218, while 1,292,138 voters were accredited. Total number of votes cast was 1,289,027, while number of valid votes was 1,266,967. Rejected votes were 22,060.

Candidate	Party	Votes	%
Babagana Umara Zulum	All Progressives Congress	1,175,440	92.78
Mohammad Imam	People's Democratic Party	66,115	5.22
Other candidates		25,412	2.01
Total		1,266,967	100.00
Valid votes		1,266,967	98.29
Invalid/blank votes		22,060	1.71
Total votes		1,289,027	100.00
Registered voters/turnout		2,316,218	55.65
Source: Premium Times

=== By local government area ===
Here are the results of the election by local government area for the two major parties. The total valid votes of 1,266,967 represents the 32 political parties that participated in the election. Blue represents LGAs won by Babagana Umara Zulum. Green represents LGAs won by Mohammad Imam.

LGA	Babagana Umara Zulum APC		Mohammad Imam PDP		Total votes
LGA	#	%	#	%	#
Abadam	9,968		50		
Askira/Uba	58,719		9,800		
Bayo	33,752		1,903		
Biu	46,794		5,597		
Damboa	36,617		721		
Gwoza	120,213		3,118		
Gubio	33,203		419		
Guzamala	28,030		277		
Dikwa	22,138		1,542		
Kaga	16,647		1,166		
Kala/Balge	35,780		497		
Kukawa	29,040		344		
Kwaya Kusar	19,790		6,860		
Mafa	53,011		163		
Magumeri	22,261		123		
Marte	19,329		173		
Mobbar	35,828		622		
Monguno	41,999		493		
Ngala	42,301		1,910		
Nganzai	20,196		907		
Chibok	19,370		1,804		
Konduga	31,484		2,407		
Jere	122,384		3,440		
Bama	54,783		1,036		
Hawul	29,845		7,039		
Maiduguri	168,952		5,493		
Shani	23,006		8,205		
Totals	1,175,440		66,115		1,266,967
