= Borno North Senatorial District =

Local government area in Nigeria

Borno North Senatorial District is one of the three senatorial zones in Borno State, located in Nigeria’s North-East geopolitical region. It is made up of nine local government areas: Abadam, Gubio, Guzamala, Kukawa, Magumeri, Marte, Mobbar, Monguno, and Nganzai. Mohammed Tahir Monguno is the senator representing borno north senatorial district since after Nigerian 2023 senate election and the Chief Whip of the 10th Assembly, having replaced Mohammed Ali Ndume after Ndume criticized president Bola Ahmed Tinubu.

== Senators Representing the District ==
Senators representing Borno north senatorial district
Senator	Year	Assembly	Party
Maina Maaji Lawan	1999-2003	4th	PDP
Mohammed Daggash	2003-2007	5th	PDP
Maina Maaji Lawan	2007-2015	6th and 7th	ANPP
Abubakar Kyari	2015-2022	8th and 9th	APC
Mohammed Tahir Monguno	2023–present	10th	APC
