= Borno South Senatorial District =

Borno South is one of the three senatorial districts in Borno State, Nigeria. Located in the southern part of the state, the district is made up of nine local government areas. The local government areas include: Biu, Hawul, Kwaya Kusar, Shani, Damboa, Chibok, Askira/Uba, Bayo, Gwoza. Mohammed Ali Ndume is the current senator representing the district, he has been representing the district since 2011.

== Senators Representing the District ==
Senators representing Borno South Senatorial District
Senator	Year	Assembly	Party
Abubakar Mahdi	1999–2003	4th	PDP
Omar Abubakar Hambagda	2003–2011	5th, 6th	ANPP
Mohammed Ali Ndume	2011–present	7th, 8th, 9th and 10th	ANPP, PDP and APC
