= Borno Central senatorial district =

Senatorial district in Borno State, Nigeria

The Borno Central senatorial district in Borno State, Nigeria covers the local government areas of Bama, Dikwa, Jere, Kaga, Kala/Balge, Konduga, Mafa, Maiduguri, and Ngala. The senator currently representing the district is Kaka Shehu Lawan, he was elected in 2023 under the platform of the All Progressives Congress, to succeed Vice President Kashim Shettima.

== List of senators ==
Senator	Party	Year	Assembly	Ref
Ali Modu Sheriff	NRC	5 December 1992 – 17 November 1993	3rd	
Ali Modu Sheriff	ANPP	3 June 1999 – 3 June 2003	4th	
Mohammed Abba Aji	ANPP	3 June 2003 – 5 June 2007	5th	
Kaka Mallam Yale	ANPP	5 June 2007 – 6 June 2011	6th	
Ahmed Zanna	PDP/APC	6 June 2011 – 16 May 2015	7th	
Baba Kaka Bashir Garbai	APC	4 November 2015 – 9 June 2019	8th	
Kashim Shettima	APC	11 June 2019 – 29 May 2023	9th	
Kaka Shehu Lawan	APC	13 June 2023 – present	10th	
