= Battle of Marte =

- Part of Boko Haram insurgency
Date	24–25 April 2015
Location	Marte, Borno State, Nigeria
Result	ISWAP victory
Territorial changes	Marte and surrounding villages fall under Boko Haram control

Belligerents
Nigeria	Islamic State - West Africa Province

Strength
Several hundred	2,000

Casualties and losses
Heavy	Heavy

Between 24 and 25 April 2015, militants from the Islamic State – West Africa Province (ISWAP) attacked the town of Marte, Borno State, Nigeria, capturing it from Nigerian forces. The battle was the first success of Boko Haram in 2015 since the Baga massacre in January.

== Background ==
Boko Haram emerged in 2009 as a jihadist social and political movement in a failed rebellion in northeast Nigeria. Throughout the following years, Abubakar Shekau unified militant Islamist groups in the region and continued to foment the rebellion against the Nigerian government, conducting terrorist attacks and bombings in cities and communities across the region. On 7 March 2015, the group publicly declared allegiance to the Islamic State and became known as the Islamic State – West Africa Province (ISWAP).

During the 2015 West African offensive, Nigerian, Chadian, and Nigerien forces recaptured large swathes of Borno State that Boko Haram captured in late 2014. The offensive intensified in March, when Chadian and Nigerien forces captured Damasak, Chadian forces captured Dikwa, and Nigerian forces captured Bama and Gwoza. Malam Fatori fell to the allied forces on 1 April. Many jihadists fled into the forests of Borno State to recoup their losses.

Marte was among the towns recaptured by the allied offensive after having been under Boko Haram control since 2013.

== Battle ==
About 2,000 ISWAP fighters entered Marte on the night of 24 April, sparking battles with Nigerian forces. These battles lasted all night and into the morning of 25 April. Several hundred Nigerian soldiers attempted to resist the attack in Marte and the neighboring town of Kirenowa, but were overrun. Casualties from the battle are unknown, but expected to be significant.

On 25 April, the same day of the fall, Nigerian officials did not confirm whether Marte had fallen, and called the withdrawal from the town a strategic retreat. Nigerian Defense Headquarters confirmed on 28 April that Nigerian forces were not in control of Marte. ISWAP recaptured Marte again on the night between 15 and 16 May.
