= General Hospital Marte =

Coordinates: 12.3643°N 13.8249°E

Geography
- Location: New marte, Borno State, Nigeria

Links
- Lists: Hospitals in Nigeria

The General Hospital Marte is a public hospital, located in New Marte, Marte Local Government Area, Borno State, Nigeria. It operates on 24hours basis.
