= Gubio massacre =

Massacre in Borno, Nigeria

Coordinates: 12.496°N 12.779°E

- Part of the Boko Haram insurgency
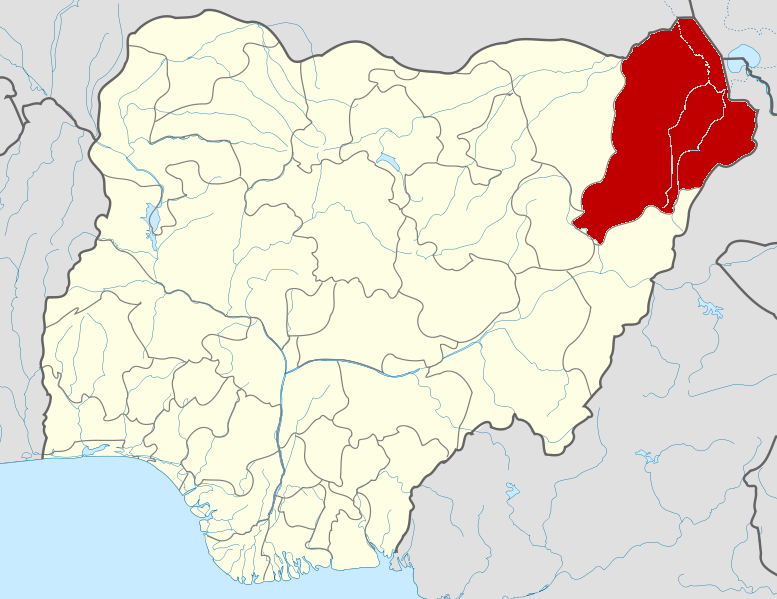
- Location of Borno State in Nigeria
- Location: Gubio, Borno State, Nigeria
- Date: 9 June 2020
- Attack type: Mass shooting, arson, kidnapping
- Deaths: 82
- Injuries: Several
- Perpetrator: ISWAP

During the afternoon of 9 June 2020, a massacre occurred in a village in Gubio Local Government Area of Borno State, northeastern Nigeria. A group of gunmen on motorcycles and other vehicles attacked the village for over two hours, killing at least 81 people. Thirteen other people were injured in the attack, and seven others abducted. The attackers also killed over 300 cows and stole another 1,000. An Air Force fighter jet fired shots at the insurgents as they left. The insurgents returned the following morning, killing a herdsman who escaped the massacre, then set fire to the village. No group claimed responsibility, but suspicion fell on the jihadist group Boko Haram.

On the same day, a 200-strong gang attacked Kadisau, a village in Katsina State. They looted it, killing at least 20 people who tried to defend it. No group claimed responsibility.
