= Al-Ansar University Maiduguri =

Nigrian University

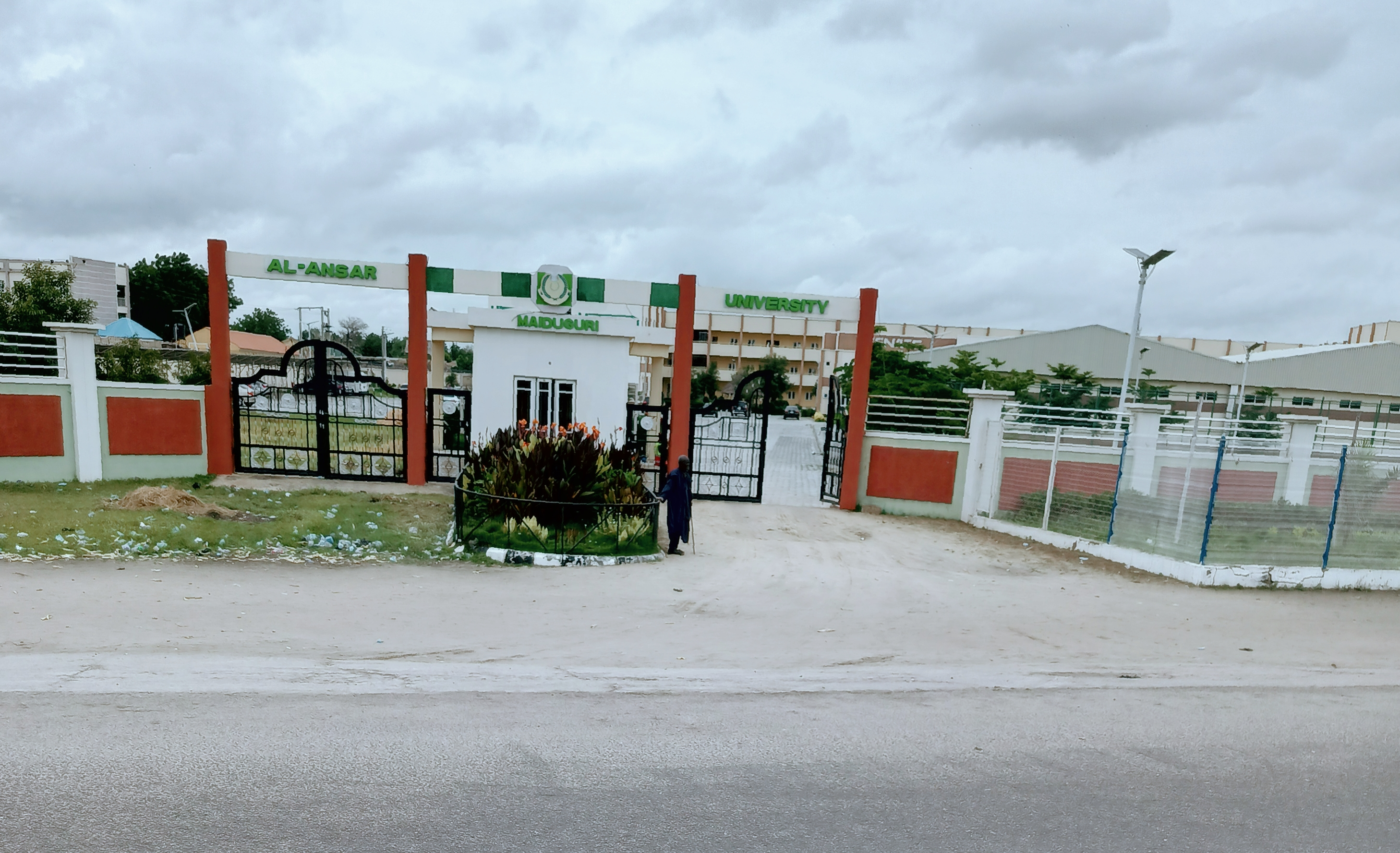
- Type: Private
- Established: April 6, 2020
- Vice-Chancellor: Professor Abubakar Musa Kundiri
- Location: Maiduguri, Borno, Nigeria; 11.8679°N 13.1263°E
- Campus: Urban
- Website: www.aum.edu.ng

Al-Ansar University Maiduguri is a private university located in Maiduguri, Borno State, Nigeria.

== Description ==
Established in 2020 by the Al-Ansar Foundation, it is the first private university in Borno State. The university was approved by the National Universities Commission (NUC) in December 2020.

The university offers undergraduate programs in sciences, social and management sciences, and arts and humanities, with plans to expand into postgraduate studies and professional programs.

== Vice chancellors ==
- Prof. Abubakar Musa Kundiri (2022 - 2025) The pioneer vice chancellor.
- Prof. Fanna Inna Abdulrahman (2025 - till date) Acting vice chancellor.

== courses ==
College of Arts, Management & Social Science

- B.A. Arabic
- B.A. Islamic Studies
- B.Sc. Accounting
- B.Sc. Economics
- B.A. English Language & Literary Studies
- B.Sc. Entrepreneurship
- B.Sc. Human Resource Management
- B.Sc. Procurement Management
- B.Sc. Mass Communication
- B.Sc. Peace Studies & Conflict Resolution
- B.Sc. Criminology & Security Studies

College of Science, Information & Communication Technology

- B.Sc. Computer Science
- B.Sc. Cyber Security
- B.Sc. Software Engineering
- B.Sc. Information Technology
- B.Sc. Data Science
- B.Sc. Biotechnology
- B.Sc. Biochemistry
- B.Sc. Petroleum Chemistry
- B.Sc. Microbiology
- B.Sc. Industrial Mathematics
- B.Sc. Physics with Electronics

College of Medicine & Health Sciences

- Bachelor of Medicine, Bachelor of Surgery (MBBS)
- B.NSc. Nursing Science
- B.Sc. Public Health
- B.MLS. Medical Laboratory Science
- Human Anatomy
- Human Physiology
