= Kaka Shehu Lawan =

Nigerian politician

Kaka Shehu Lawan is a Nigerian politician. He currently serve as the senator representing Borno Central Senatorial District in Borno state in the 10th Senate under the platform of the All Progressives Congress (APC).
