= 2003 Borno State gubernatorial election =

2003 gubernatorial election in Borno State, Nigeria

- (Nigeria)
- April 19, 2003
Nominee	Ali Modu Sheriff	Mala Kachalla
Party	ANPP	AD
Running mate	Adamu Dibal
Popular vote	581,880
Governor before election
Mala Kachalla
AD
Elected Governor
Ali Modu Sheriff
ANPP

The 2003 Borno State gubernatorial election occurred on April 19, 2003. Incumbent governor, ANPP's Ali Modu Sheriff won election for a second term, defeating AD's Mala Kachalla and three other candidates. Sheriff allegedly sought for Boko Haram's assistance to win the election.

Ali Modu Sheriff emerged the ANPP candidate in the gubernatorial primary election. His running mate was Adamu Shettima Yuguda Dibal.

== Electoral system ==
The Governor of Borno State is elected using the plurality voting system.

== Results ==
A total of four candidates registered with the Independent National Electoral Commission to contest in the election. ANPP candidate, Ali Modu Sheriff, defeated the incumbent governor and three others to win the election.

The total number of registered voters in the state was 2,156,019. However, only 37.92% (i.e. 817,533) of registered voters participated in the exercise.

Candidate	Party	Votes	%
Ali Modu Sheriff	All Nigeria Peoples Party (ANPP)	581,880	100.00
Mala Kachalla	Alliance for Democracy (AD)		
Kashim Ibrahim-Imam	People's Democratic Party (PDP)		
United Nigeria People's Party (UNPP)			
Abdulwahab Mohammed	African Renaissance Party (ARP)		
Comrade Shettima	National Democratic Party (NDP)		
Total		581,880	100.00
Registered voters/turnout		2,156,019	–
Source: Gamji, Africa Update, Dawodu
