= Sa'id Alkali Kori =

Chairman of Nigeria Food Corporation (NFC)

Technical Adviser to the Lake Chad Basin Governors Forum

Personal details
- Education: Federal University of Technology, Yola University of Salford, University of Liverpool
- Occupation: Businessman
- Profession: Architect

Sa’id Alkali Kori is a Nigerian architect, entrepreneur and development expert. He currently serves as the Honorary Special Adviser on International Relations and Development to the Governor of Yobe State and as a Technical Adviser to the Lake Chad Basin Governors Forum, and is the chairman of Nigeria Food Corporation

== Education ==
Kori holds a bachelor's degree in architecture from the Federal University of Technology, Yola (now Modibbo Adama University). He obtained a master's degree from the University of Salford, United Kingdom, and later earned a Doctor of Philosophy (Ph.D.) in a built environment-related field from the University of Liverpool.

== Career ==
Kori has experience in academia, development finance, and advisory services. He previously lectured at the University of Liverpool and Yobe State University. He also worked as the General Manager of Family Homes Funds, where he was involved in project management and housing initiatives.

He is the founder and Group Chief Executive Officer of Thinklab Group Limited, a company involved in construction and development consulting. Kori has also served on the boards of organizations such as BIM Africa and Fulus Capital.

In June 2025, he received two notable appointments: Honorary Special Adviser on International Relations and Development to the Governor of Yobe State, Mai Mala Buni, Technical Adviser to the Lake Chad Basin Governors Forum. These roles involve supporting regional development, fostering multilateral partnerships, and contributing to international cooperation among Lake Chad Basin member states. He’s the Chairman, Board members, Borno Investment Promotion Agency.
