= Mohammed Kumalia =

Nigerian politician

Mohammed Umara Kumalia

Member House of Representatives of Nigeria for Maiduguri metropolitan council.
- In office 1999–2007
- Succeeded by: Mustapha Baba Shehuri
- Constituency: Maiduguri Metropolitan Council

Personal details
- Born: Mohammed Umara Kumalia; 6 September 1967 (age 58) Borno, Maiduguri
- Party: Peoples Democratic Party (2022– Present)
- Other political affiliations: All Nigeria People's Party (1998–2006) Peoples Democratic Party (2008–2016) All Progressive Congress (2016–2022)
- Spouse(s): Amina kumalia and Kaaka Kumalia
- Occupation: A Politician in the Pan-African Parliament of Nigeria, Former member of the House of Representatives of Nigeria, currently he is a senior partner in prime law firm and the CEO of PPP Advisories and Prime properties.

Mohammed Umara Kumalia is a politician in the Pan-African Parliament of Nigeria. He was born in 1967, he was the 1999 APP leader. He was a member of the House of Representatives of Nigeria from 1999 to 2007 and served as minority leader from 1999 to 2003. After 8 years in the National assembly and serving in different capacities kumalia left to go and pursue his governorship ambition.

== Background ==
Mohammed Kumalia was born in Maiduguri, Borno State. His father was a renowned and well respected teacher at the time. He attended Government Secondary School, Maiduguri, He then studied law (LL.B.) at the University of Maiduguri, qualified as a lawyer, and is a senior partner of Prime law firm. He also has specialized training as a legislative draftsman from the Royal Institute of Public Administration London. Before his election into the House of Representatives, Kumalia worked as a Legislative Draftsman with the National Assembly for several years during which period he served as the Secretary, Nigerian Constitution Review Committee (Adhoc).

== Northern Reawakening Forum ==
The Northern Reawakening Forum is a socio-political and development-focused advocacy organization based in Northern Nigeria. The forum comprises professionals, political leaders, business figures, academics, and civil society representatives who aim to promote peace, unity, and sustainable development across the northern region of the country. It was established to address the growing socio-economic and security challenges in Northern Nigeria, including poverty, unemployment, insecurity, and educational decline. The organization is chaired by Mohammed Umara Kumalia, a lawyer and former Minority Leader of the Nigerian House of Representatives. Under his leadership, the forum has sought to mobilize Northern professionals and civic actors to participate actively in the region’s political and economic renewal.
