= Babagana Zulum =

Nigerian politician (born 1969)

His Excellency Babagana Zulum CON, GCON
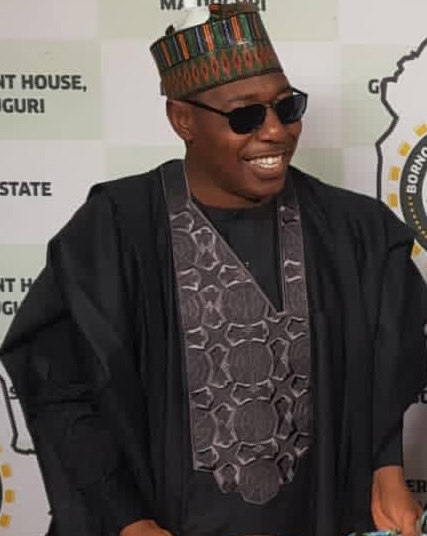
- Zulum in 2020

Governor of Borno State
- Incumbent
- Assumed office 29 May 2019; Kadafur Acting: 29 April 2021 to 19 May 2021
- Deputy: Umar Usman Kadafur
- Preceded by: Kashim Shettima

Borno State Commissioner for Reconstruction, Rehabilitation and Resettlement
- In office 17 September 2015 – 29 May 2019
- Governor: Kashim Shettima
- Preceded by: position established
- Succeeded by: Mustapha Gubio

Personal details
- Born: 25 August 1969 (age 57) Mafa, North-Eastern State, Nigeria (now in Borno State)
- Party: All Progressives Congress
- Education: University of Maiduguri
- Occupation: Politician; professor
- Website: www.zulum.ng

Babagana Umara Zulum CON mni (born 25 August 1969) is a Nigerian Professor and Politician who is the current governor of Borno State since 2019 under the platform of the All Progressives Congress (APC).

== Early life and education ==
Zulum was born on 25 August 1969, in Mafa Local Government Area of Borno State.

After elementary school in Mafa Primary School from 1975 to 1980 and secondary education in Government Secondary School, Monguno from 1980 to 1985, Zulum studied at the University of Maiduguri, where he obtained a degree in Agriculture Engineering after which he served as a youth corps member with Katsina State Polytechnic. He proceeded to the University of Ibadan from 1997 to 1998, where he obtained a master's degree in Agriculture Engineering. In 2005, he enrolled for a PhD in Soil and Water Engineering with the University of Maiduguri which he completed in 2009.

== Career ==
Zulum's first appointment was in 1989 with Borno State Civil Service as an Assistant Technical Officer in the State's Ministry of Agriculture.

In 1990, Babagana moved into Borno State Unified Local Government Service as Senior Field Overseer and later Principal Water Engineer. In 2000, he took up an appointment with the University of Maiduguri as an assistant Lecturer where he rose to the rank of Professor. Babagana was Deputy Dean and Acting Dean, Faculty of Engineering in 2010 and 2011 respectively. In 2011, Babagana Umara was appointed the rector of the state-owned Ramat Polytechnic in Maiduguri. Meanwhile, he retained his teaching position in the University of Maiduguri.

In 2015, Governor Kashim Shetima of Borno State made Zulum the Commissioner of the newly established ministry of Reconstruction, Rehabilitation and Resettlement.

== Publications ==
Zulum has written papers and article for publication in both local and international journals, in the area of Agriculture Engineering.

== Politics ==
On 1 October 2018, he won the gubernatorial primaries of the All Progressives Congress for Borno State. He was elected to the office of the governor of Borno State in the 2019 Borno gubernatorial election held on 9 March 2019, with 1175440 votes.

In 2023, according to the Independent National Electoral Commission (INEC), Professor Babagana Umara Zulum won the March 18 Governorship election with a total votes of 545,543 to defeat his closest contender Mohammed Jajari of the Peoples Democratic Party PDP who scored 82,147 votes as re-elected governor for the second term in the office. In August 2020, Zulum emerged as the Chairman of the northeast governors forum after a meeting in Maiduguri.

== Assassination attempts ==
Zulum has been the target of several failed assassination attempts by the group Boko Haram.

His convoy was attacked by Boko Haram insurgents on 29 July 2020, on Maiduguri-Damaturu highway. Five people were killed including three policemen.

On 26 September 2020, Zulum and his convoy were again attacked by Boko Haram near Lake Chad. At least 18 people were reportedly killed, including 14 police officers and soldiers and 4 civilians. The death toll was later updated to 30 as more bodies were found.

Three days later, on the 29, Zulum's convoy noticed a donkey on the road and shot at it. After the donkey exploded due to the bomb on it, insurgents came out of hiding and fired at them. A number of insurgents were killed, whereas no one in the convoy was injured.

On 22 November 2020, a convoy belonging to Zulum was attacked while he was traveling to meet with government officials in Baga. Seven soldiers and two civilians were killed in this ambush, but the governor was unhurt.

== Awards ==
In October 2022, a Nigerian National Honour of Commander Of The Order Of The Niger (CON) was conferred on him by President Muhammadu Buhari.

In 2020, Governor Babagana Umara Zulum of Borno also received the Nigerein’s Second Order National Honour, “de Grand Officer dans I`Ordre”.

== Life Blessing ==
on the 2 November 2026, Professor Zulum in company of President Bola Ahmed Tinubu entered the Holy Ka'aba along side other delegations.

== Projects ==
Babagana Zulum, has completed and commissioned 77 projects for service deliveries in the health, education and other sectors of the economy.

=== Distribution of Palliatives ===
Zulum stated that the palliative distribution was to salvage communities whose sources of livelihood were cut off due to the activities of Boko Haram insurgents.

== See also ==
- List of governors of Borno State
- List of local government in Borno State
