= 2019 Nigerian Senate elections in Borno State =

2019 Nigerian Senate election in Bornu State

The 2019 Nigerian Senate elections in Bornu State were held on 23 February 2019, to elect members of the Nigerian Senate to represent Bornu State. Governor Shettima Kashim representing Bornu Central, Kyari Abubakar Shaib representing Bornu North, and Ndume Mohammed Ali representing Bornu South all won on the platform of All Progressives Congress.

== Overview ==
| Affiliation | Party | | Total |
| Affiliation | APC | PDP | Total |
|---|---|---|---|
| Before Election | 3 | 0 | 3 |
| After Election | 3 | 0 | 3 |

== Summary ==
| District | Incumbent | Party | Elected Senator | Party |
|---|---|---|---|---|
| Bornu Central | Baba Kaka Bashir Garbai | APC | Kashim Shettima | APC |
| Bornu North | Abubakar Kyari | APC | Abubakar Kyari | APC |
| Bornu South | Mohammed Ali Ndume | APC | Mohammed Ali Ndume | APC |

== Results ==
=== Bornu Central ===
A total of 20 candidates registered with the Independent National Electoral Commission to contest in the election. APC candidate Shettima Kashim won the election, defeating PDP candidate Muhammed Abba Aji and 18 other party candidates. Shettima received 80.90% of the votes, while Abba-Aji received 17.83%.

2019 Nigerian Senate election in Bornu State
| Party | Candidate | Votes | % |
|---|---|---|---|
| APC | Kashim Shettima | 342,898 | 80.90% |
| PDP | Muhammed Abba-Aji | 75,569 | 17.8% |
| Others | | 5,360 | 1.26% |
| Total votes | | 423,827 | 100% |
| APC hold | | | |

=== Bornu North ===
A total of 8 candidates registered with the Independent National Electoral Commission to contest in the election. APC candidate Kyari Abubakar Shaib won the election, defeating PDP candidate Isa Lawan and 6 other party candidates. Shaib received 67.69% of the votes, while Lawan received 31.70%.

2019 Nigerian Senate election in Lagos State
| Party | Candidate | Votes | % |
|---|---|---|---|
| APC | Kyari Abubakar Shaib | 76,963 | 67.69% |
| PDP | Isa Lawan | 36,042 | 31.70% |
| Others | | 690 | 0.60% |
| Total votes | | 113,695 | 100% |
| APC hold | | | |

=== Bornu South ===
A total of 11 candidates registered with the Independent National Electoral Commission to contest in the election. APC candidate Ndume Mohammed Ali won the election, defeating PDP candidate Kudla Milinda Satumari and 9 other party candidates. Ndume received 75.53% of the votes, while Satumari received 21.25%.

2019 Nigerian Senate election in Bornu State
| Party | Candidate | Votes | % |
|---|---|---|---|
| APC | Ndume Mohammed Ali | 300,637 | 75.53% |
| PDP | Kudla Milinda Satumari | 84,608 | 21.25% |
| Others | | 12,773 | 3.20 |
| Total votes | | 398,018 | 100% |
| APC hold | | | |
