= Guzamala =

- Local Government Area
- Interactive map of Guzamala
- Country: Nigeria
- State: Borno State
- Headquarters: Gudumbali

Area
  - Total: 2,517 km^{2} (972 sq mi)

Population (2006)
  - Total: 95,648
  - Density: 38.00/km^{2} (98.42/sq mi)
- Time zone: UTC+1 (WAT)
- Postal code: 612

Guzamala is a Local Government Area of Borno State, Nigeria. Its headquarters are in the town of Gudumbali. It is located approximately 125 km (78 miles) north of the state capital, Maiduguri. It has an area of 2,517 km^{2} and a population of 95,648 at the 2006 census.

The postal code of the area is 612.

It is a part of the traditional Borno Emirate.

This Local Government Area is located very close to the northern axis of Borno state. It is bordered by six LGAs. These LGAs are Mobbar, Gubio, Nganzai, Monguno, Kukawa and Abadan LGAs.

== Climate/Geography ==
The Guzamala Local Government Area spans 2,517 square kilometres (972 square miles) and experiences two distinct seasons: the dry season, which occurs from October to April, and the rainy season, which occurs from May to September. The average temperature and humidity in Guzamala LGA are 33 degrees Celsius (91 degrees Fahrenheit) and 19 percent, respectively.

== Wards ==
It has 10 local wards. They are:- Aduwa, Gudumbali East, Gudumbali West, Guworam, Guzamala East, Guzamala West, kingarwa, Maijari, Moduri, Wamiri.

The Kanuri ethnic group lives in the LGA.

It is one of the sixteen LGAs that constitute the Borno Emirate, a traditional state located in Borno State, Nigeria.

== Insurgency ==
In June 2022 it was reported that all but two villages within Guzamala were under ISWAP control, including the area's administrative headquarters at Gudumbali.
