= Kaga, Nigeria =

Kaga
- Local Government Area
- Interactive map of Kaga
- Coordinates: 11.6452°N 12.4516°E
- Country: Nigeria
- State: Borno State
- Headquarters: Damboa

Area
  - Total: 2,700 km^{2} (1,000 sq mi)

Population (2006)
  - Total: 90,015
  - Density: 33/km^{2} (86/sq mi)
- Time zone: UTC+1 (WAT)
- Postal code: 601

Kaga is a Local Government Area of Borno State, Nigeria. Its headquarters are in the town of Benisheikh.

It has an area of 2,700 km^{2} and a population of 90,015 according to the census 2006.

The postal code for the area is 601.

Kaga is one of the sixteen LGAs that constitute the Borno Emirate, a traditional state located in Borno State, Nigeria.

== Climate/Geography ==
Kaga LGA has a total area of 2,700 square kilometres (1,000 sq mi) and experiences two distinct seasons: the rainy and the dry. The average temperature and humidity in the area are 34 °C (93 °F) and 25%, respectively.
