= Abadam =

- Local Government Area and town
- Interactive map of Abadam
- Coordinates: 13.610953°N 13.277664°E
- Country: Nigeria
- State: Borno State
- Headquarters: Mallam Fatori

Area
  - Total: 3,973 km^{2} (1,534 sq mi)

Population (2006)
  - Total: 100,180
  - Density: 25.22/km^{2} (65.31/sq mi)
- Time zone: UTC+1 (WAT)
- Area code: 602

Abadam is a remote Local Government Area and town in Borno State, Nigeria, on the western coast of Lake Chad. It borders Chad and Niger, and it is very close to Cameroon. In 2016 its population is projected to be 140,000 inhabitants. Its headquarters are in the town of Mallam Fatori. Security, healthcare, infrastructure, and climate change are some of the major challenges in Abadam Local government.

== Landscape ==
It has a landmass area of 3,973 km^{2}.

== Population ==
Abadam had a total population of 100,180 in the 2006 population census.

== Postal code ==
The postal code of the area is 602.

== History ==
It is one of the sixteen LGAs that constitute the Borno Emirate, a traditional state located in Borno State, Nigeria.

== Climate ==
Abadam has a hot semi-arid climate influenced by the Lake Chad basin. Rainfall is concentrated between June and September, while the long dry season lasts from October to May and is dominated by dry Harmattan winds. Average temperatures typically range from 25 °C (77 °F) to 41 °C (106 °F), with annual rainfall generally below 500 mm (1.6 ft).

== Cases of Insurgency ==
In October 2014, Boko Haram fighters took over Abadam town, with at least 40 deaths, but fled after an attack by Multinational Joint Task Force (MNJTF) troops. Local residents, some of whom had fled to Niger border areas, were urged to return.

On 2 February 2015, the Nigerian Army said it had recaptured Abadam from Boko Haram, along with the nearby towns of Gamboru, Mafa, Mallam Fatori, and Marte, following joint military operations by Nigerian and Cameroonian forces, civilian forces, and three days of Chadian airstrikes. A bomb dropped by an air strike struck in the midst of a mourning ceremony, which injured 27 people and killed 37 persons. Borno State senator Baba Kaka Garbai however stated in February 2016 that the group still controlled Abadam. Major General Lucky Irabor also stated in August 2016 that Abadam was under control of the militants.
