= Kwaya Kusar =

- Local Government Area and town
- Interactive map of Kwaya Kusar
- Country: Nigeria
- State: Borno State
- Headquarters: Kwaya Kusar

Area
  - Total: 732 km^{2} (283 sq mi)

Population (2006)
  - Total: 56,500
  - Density: 77.2/km^{2} (200/sq mi)
- Time zone: UTC+1 (WAT)
- Postal code: 603

Kwaya Kusar is a town and Local Government Area of Borno State, Nigeria.

It has an area of 732 km^{2} and a population of 56,500 at the 2006 census.

The postal code of the area is 603.

The inhabitants speak the Bura language. They are mostly subsistence farmers.

It is one of the four LGAs that constitute the Biu Emirate, a traditional state located in Borno State, Nigeria.

== History ==
Kwaya Kusar is located in southern Borno State and is part of the historic Biu area. The area is predominantly inhabited by the Bura (Bura-Pabir) people, whose communities have long occupied parts of present-day Kwaya Kusar, Biu, Hawul, Shani and Bayo.

During the colonial period, Kwaya Kusar became part of the Biu administrative system. The British established Biu Division in 1918, and the area later became part of the Biu Federation.

Kwaya Kusar developed into a local administrative centre and was recognised as a Local Government Area by the early 1990s.

== Climatic Condition ==
With temperatures ranging from 16 °C (61 °F) to 39 °C (103 °F), the climate has two distinct seasons: a hot, oppressive rainy season and a scorching, windy, and partly cloudy dry season.

Kwaya Kusar has a tropical continental climate with a short rainy season from June to September and a long dry season marked by Harmattan winds. Temperatures generally range from 24 °C (75 °F) to 38 °C (100 °F), and the area receives between 700 millimetres (28 in) and 1,000 millimetres (39 in) of rainfall annually.
