= Jere, Nigeria =

Jere
- Local Government Area and town
- Interactive map of Jere
- Country: Nigeria
- State: Borno State
- Headquarters: Khaddamari

Area
  - Total: 868 km^{2} (335 sq mi)

Population (2006)
  - Total: 211,204
  - Density: 243/km^{2} (630/sq mi)
- Time zone: UTC+1 (WAT)
- Postal code: 600

Jere is a local government area of Borno State, Nigeria. It has its headquarters in the town of Khaddamari. London Ciki is a community in Jere under Maimusari ward.

== Climate /Geography ==
Jere LGA has an average temperature of 33 degrees Celsius or 94 degrees Fahrenheit and a total area of 868 square kilometres or 335 square miles. The local government region's average humidity is reported to be 29%, and the area receives 850 mm (33 in) of precipitation.

Jere experiences a hot semi-arid climate similar to that of the greater Maiduguri area. Rainfall is limited and occurs mainly from June to September, while the dry season lasts from October to May with strong Harmattan winds. Temperatures range from about 24 °C (75 °F) to 41 °C (106 °F) across the year.

== Population ==
Jere had a population of 211,204 at the 2006 census. Most of the people in Jere are from the Arabic tribes Baggara and Kanuri.

== Postal code ==
The postal code of the area is 600.

== History ==
It is one of the sixteen LGAs that constitute the Borno Emirate, a traditional state located in Borno State, Nigeria.
