= Magumeri =

- Local Government Area and town
- Interactive map of Magumeri
- Country: Nigeria
- State: Borno State
- Headquarters: Magumeri

Area
  - Total: 4,856 km^{2} (1,875 sq mi)

Population (2006)
  - Total: 140,231
  - Density: 28.88/km^{2} (74.79/sq mi)
- Time zone: UTC+1 (WAT)
- Postal code: 602

Magumeri is a town and Local Government Area of Borno State, Nigeria.

It has an area of 4,856 km^{2} and a population of 140,231 at the 2006 census.

The postal code of the area is 602.

It is one of the sixteen LGAs that constitute the Borno Emirate, a traditional state located in Borno State, Nigeria.

== Climate/Geography ==
Magumeri LGA has an average temperature of 33 degrees Celsius (91 degrees Fahrenheit) and a total area of 4,856 square kilometres (1,875 square miles). Within the LGA, there is an average wind speed of 11 km/h (6.8 mph) and an estimated 800 mm (31 in) of precipitation annually.

== Notable people ==
- Kyari Magumeri(1897–1972), was a Nigerian Army officer who fought in both World Wars
- Laminu Njitiya (died 1871), 19th-century fief-holder of Magumeri
