= Kala/Balge =

- Local Government Area and town
- Interactive map of Kala/Balge
- Country: Nigeria
- State: Borno State
- Headquarters: Rann

Area
  - Total: 1,896 km^{2} (732 sq mi)
- Time zone: UTC+1 (WAT)
- Postal code: 611

Kala/Balge is a Local Government Area of Borno State, Nigeria. It is the easternmost LGA of Nigeria. It has its headquarters in the town of Rann.

== Climate/Geography ==
The overall area of Kala Balge LGA is 1,896 square kilometres (732 square miles), with an average temperature of 34 °C (93 °F). The LGA experiences two distinct seasons: the dry and the wet. The dry season is frequently marked by exceptionally high temperatures in the region. It is calculated that the average wind speed in Kala Balge LGA is 9 km/h (5.6 mph).

== Towns and Villages ==
The LGA comprises towns and villages such as Duguma, Kulakura, Gulgum, Mada, Bombo, Diama, Sabba, and Kalam. The majority of the area's inhabitants belong to ethnic groups such as Hausa, Kanuri, and Fulani. The Hausa language is commonly spoken in the area.

== Postal Code ==
The postal code of the area is 611.

== History ==
It is one of the sixteen LGAs that constitute the Dikwa Emirate, a traditional state located in Borno State, Nigeria. The Dikwa Emirate was established in 1902 during the British colonial era following the division of the former Bornu Kingdom. Since then, Kala/Balge has been one of the local government areas under the emirate.

== Insurgency ==
On May 14, 2014, local civilian vigilantes repelled a raid by the terrorist group Boko Haram, killing over 200 militants.On May 31, 500 Boko Haram terrorists returned and overwhelmed the vigilantes killing 40.
