= Hawul =

- Local Government Area and town
- Interactive map of Hawul
- Country: Nigeria
- State: Borno State
- Headquarters: Azare

Area
  - Total: 2,098 km^{2} (810 sq mi)

Population (2006)
  - Total: 120,000
  - Density: 57/km^{2} (150/sq mi)
- Time zone: UTC+1 (WAT)
- Postal code: 603

Hawul is a Local Government Area of Borno State, Nigeria. It is located in the southern part of the state. The headquarters of the LGA are in the town of Azare and the area is made up of towns and villages which include Dagiza, Bantali, Damudanaka, Kidang, Samari, Pakilama, Tong, Ghuma, and Shaffa. Hawul LGA is part of the Biu Emirate with the Emir superintending over the traditional affairs of the LGA. The Hausa, Kanuri, and Fufulde languages are commonly spoken in the LGA while Islam and Christianity are widely practiced in the LGA. It has an area of 2,098 km^{2} and a population of about 120,000 at the 2006 census.

The postal code of the area is 603.

It is one of the four LGAs that constitute the Biu Emirate, a traditional state located in Borno State, Nigeria.

== Climate/Geography ==
Hawul LGA has an average temperature of 34 degrees Celsius or 93 degrees Fahrenheit and a total area of 2,098 square kilometres or 810 square miles. The dry and rainy seasons are the two distinct seasons experienced by the LGA. In the Hawul LGA, the average wind speed is 10 km/h (6.2 mph), and the average humidity is 21%.

== Gallery ==
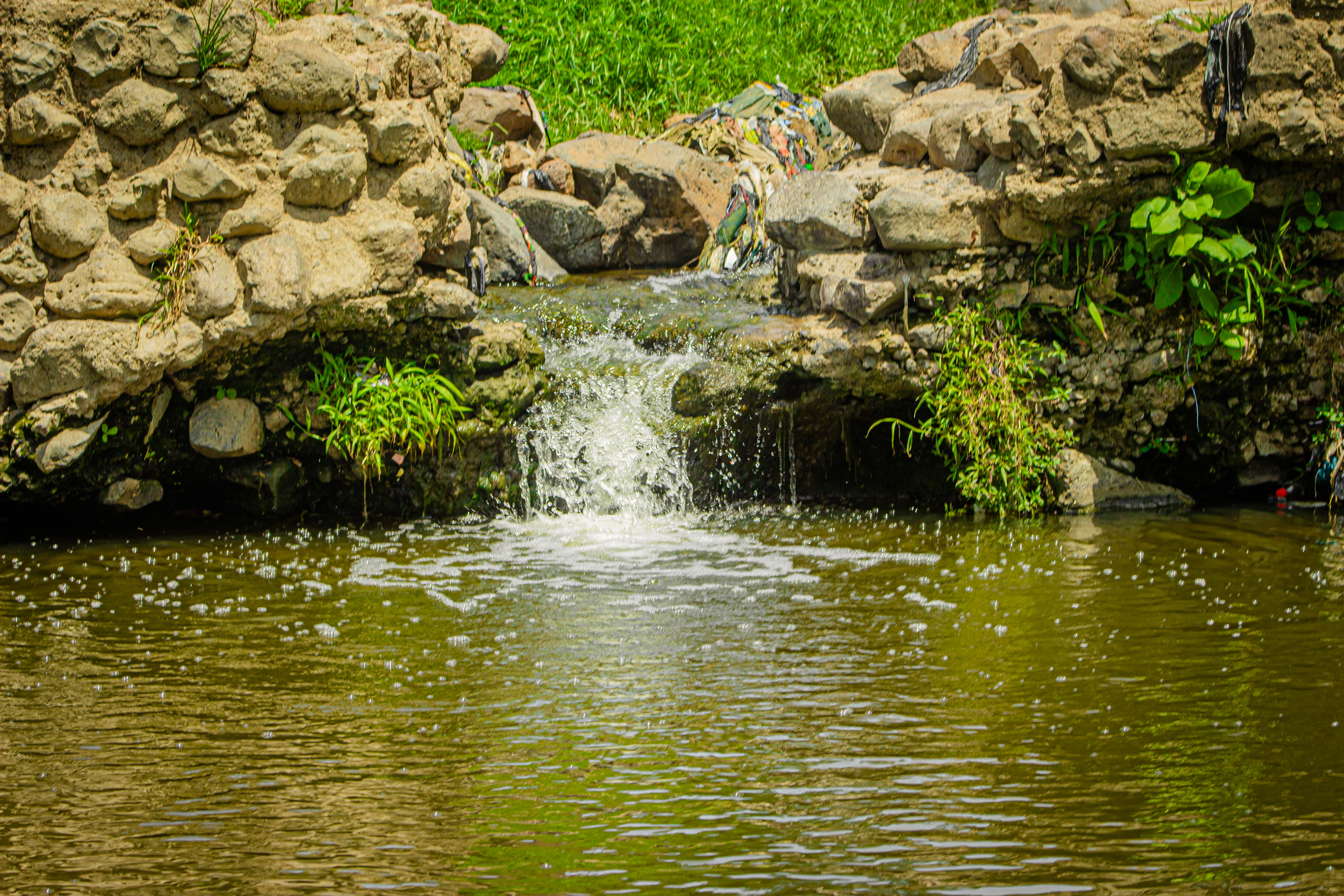
A beautiful clear water running between rocks in Hawul, Borno State

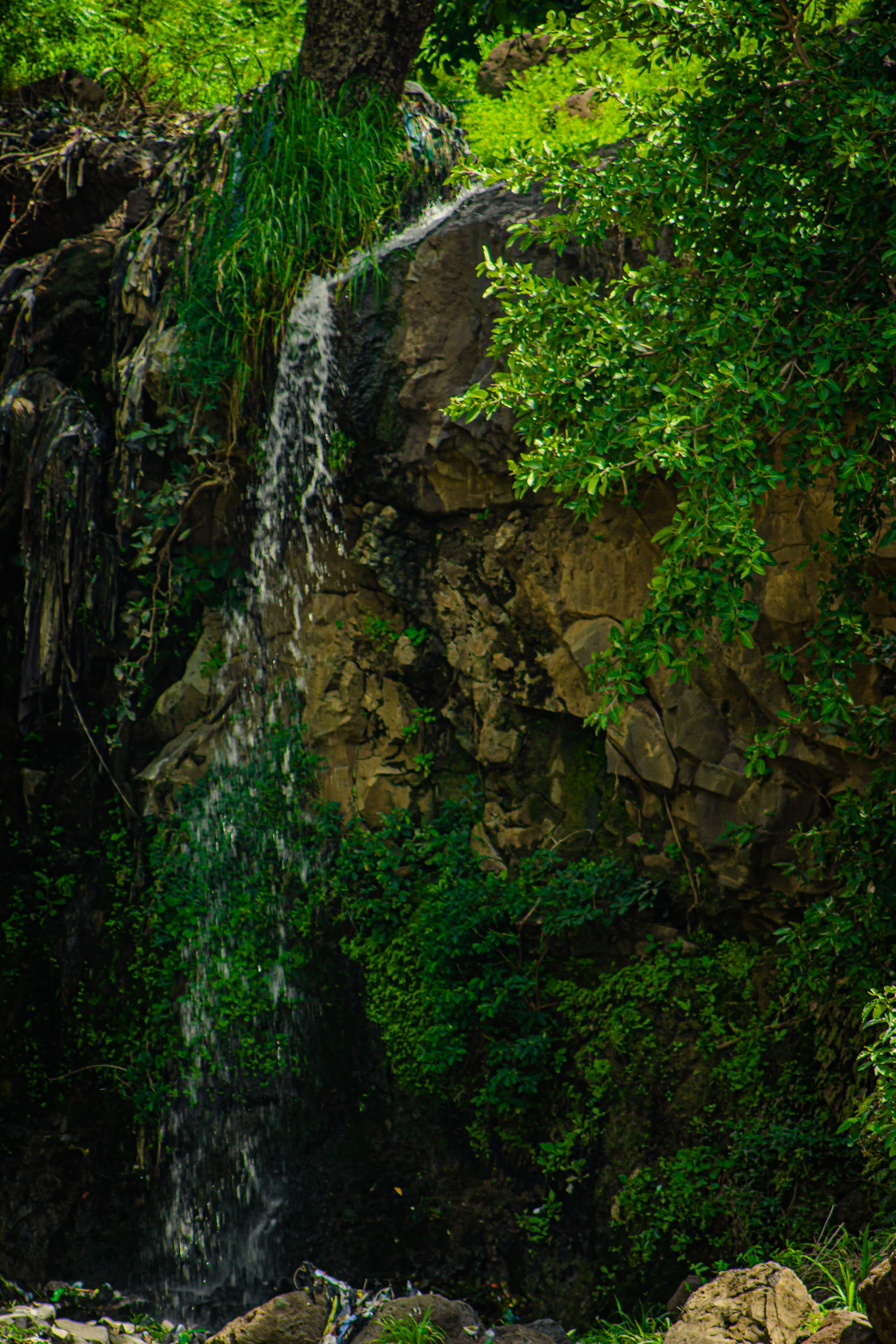
A beautiful water fall in Hawul, Borno State

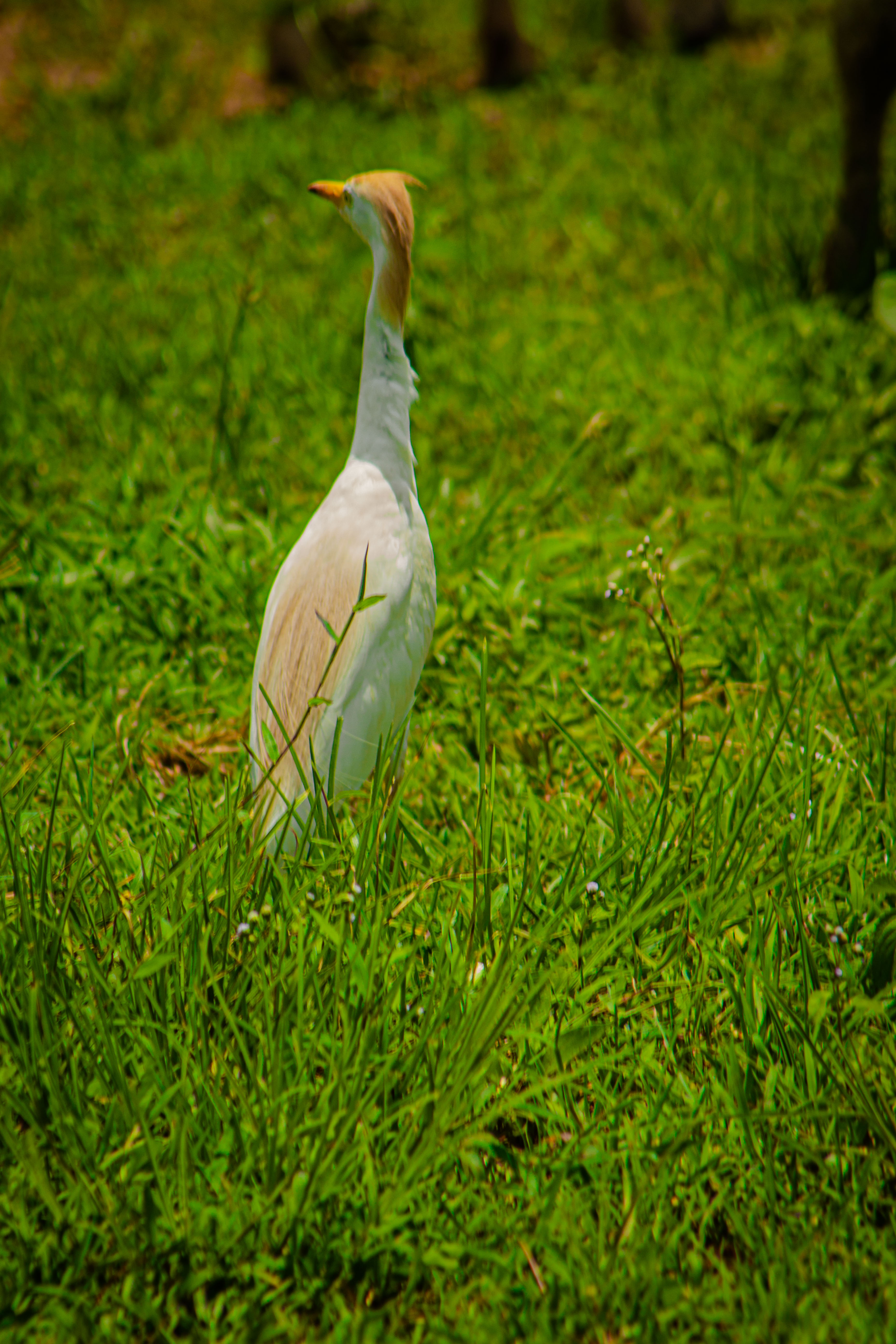
A beautiful bird in Hawul, Borno State

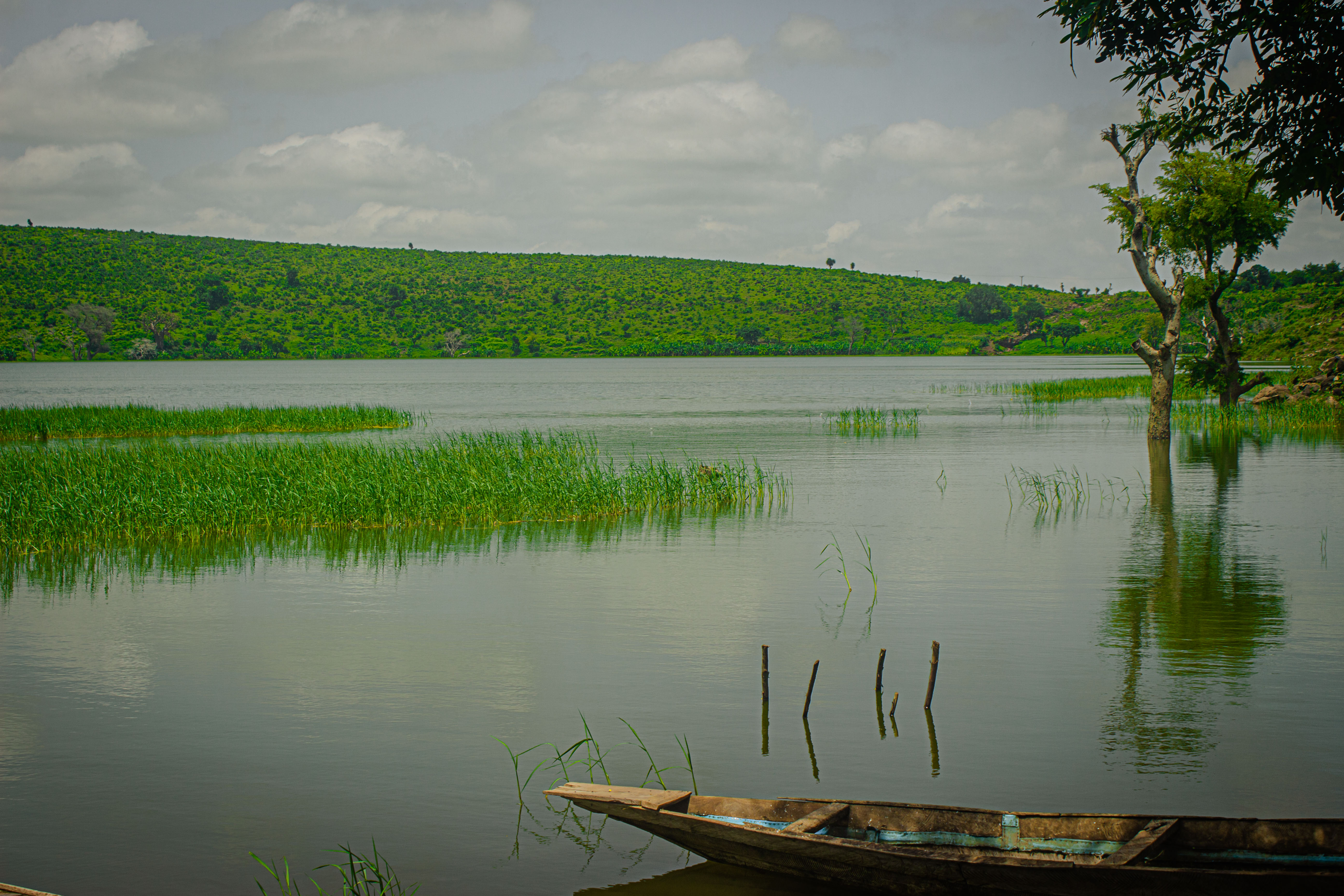
A beautiful river in Hawul, Borno State

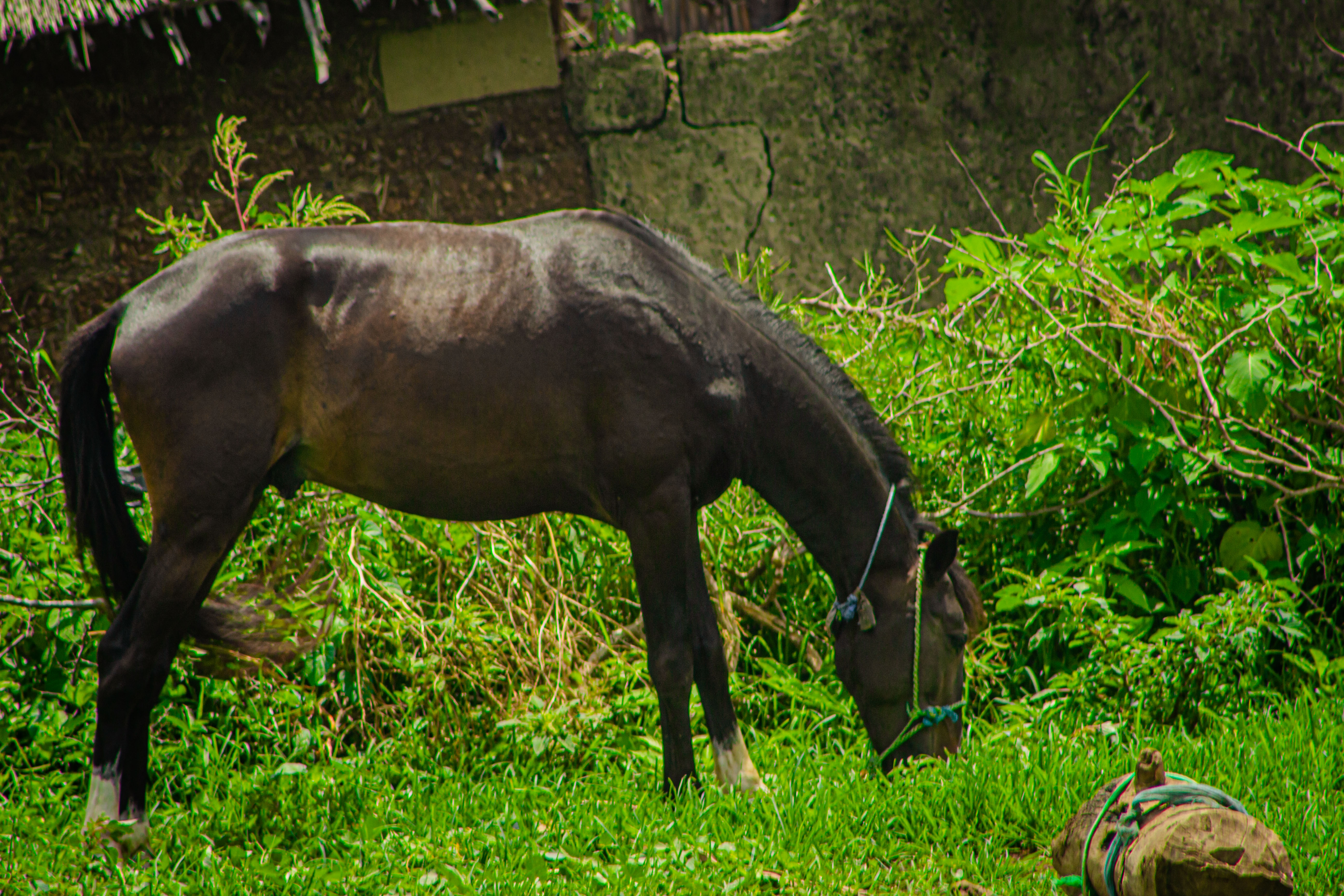
A beautiful horse eating grass in Hawul, Borno State
