= Shani, Nigeria =

Local government area of Borno, Nigeria

Shani
- Local Government Area
- Interactive map of Shani
- Coordinates: 10.220°N 12.053°E
- Country: Nigeria
- State: Borno State
- Headquarters: Shani

Area
  - Total: 1,262 km^{2} (487 sq mi)

Population (2006)
  - Total: 102,317
  - Density: 81.08/km^{2} (210.0/sq mi)
- Time zone: UTC+1 (WAT)
- Postal code: 603

Shani is a town and Local Government Area of Borno State, Nigeria. Its headquarters are in the town of Shani.

It has an area of 1,262 square kilometres (487 sq mi) and a population of 102,317 as of the 2006 census. Shani Local Government Area is located in the southeastern axis of Borno state. It is bordered by Bayo, Hawul, and Kwaya Local Government Area. Its administrative headquarters lies in the heart of Shani town.

The postal code of the area is 603.

== History ==
Shani has a long history of indigenous settlement and traditional leadership in southern Borno. During the colonial era, the area became part of the British administrative system and was incorporated into Biu Division, established in 1918. In 1957, Shani District was incorporated into the Biu Federation. After independence, Shani remained part of Borno State and later became a Local Government Area, with Shani town as its headquarters. In 1991, Hawul Local Government Area was created from the former Shani Local Government Area.

== Climatic Condition ==
Between February and April, when it is the hottest on Shani, and June to October, when it is the coolest, December is the coldest month.

Shani's climate is experiencing a warmer temperature trend, with warmer temperatures indicating a more favorable climate.

Its annual rainfall typically falls between 700 millimetres (28 in) and 1,000 millimetres (39 in)—slightly higher than the northern Sahel zones of Borno.
