= Borno State =

State of Nigeria

Borno
- State
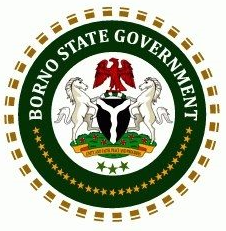
- Flag Seal
- Nicknames: Home of Peace
- Location of Borno State in Nigeria
- Coordinates: 11°30′N 13°00′E
- Country: Nigeria
- LGAs: 27
- Date created: 3 February 1976
- Capital: Maiduguri

Government
  - Body: Government of Borno State
  - Governor: Babagana Zulum (APC)
  - Deputy Governor: Umar Usman Kadafur (APC)
  - Legislature: Borno State House of Assembly
  - Senators: C: Kaka Shehu Lawan (APC); N: Mohammed Tahir Monguno (APC); S: Mohammed Ali Ndume (APC)
  - Representatives: List

Area
  - Total: 70,898 km^{2} (27,374 sq mi)
  - Rank: 2nd of 36

Population (2022)
  - Total: 6,111,500
  - Rank: 12th of 36
  - Density: 86.201/km^{2} (223.26/sq mi)

GDP (PPP)
  - Year: 2021
  - Total: $12.67 billion 29th of 36
  - Per capita: $1,823; 33rd of 36
- Time zone: UTC+01 (WAT)
- Postal codes: 600001
- ISO 3166 code: NG-BO
- HDI (2022): 0.464 low · 30th of 37

Borno is a state in the North-East geopolitical zone of Nigeria. It is bordered by Yobe to the west, Gombe to the southwest, and Adamawa is to the south, while its eastern border forms part of the national border with Cameroon. Its northern border forms part of the national border with Niger and its northeastern border forms all of the national border with Chad. It is the only Nigerian state to border up to three countries. It takes its name from the historic emirate of Borno, with the emirate's old capital of Maiduguri serving as the capital city of Borno State. The state was formed in 1976 when the former North-Eastern State was broken up. It originally included the area that is now Yobe State, which became a distinct state in 1991.

Borno is the second largest in area of the 36 states, only behind Niger State. Despite its size, the state is the eleventh most populous with an estimated population of about 5.86 million as of 2016. Geographically, the state is divided between the semi-desert Sahelian savanna in the north and the West Sudanian savanna in the centre and south with a part of the montane Mandara Plateau in the southeast. In the far northeast of the state is the Nigerian portion of Lake Chad and the Lake Chad flooded savanna ecoregion; the lake is fed by the Yobe River which forms the state's border with Niger until it reaches the lakebed. In the centre of the state is part of the Chad Basin National Park, a large national park that contains populations of black crowned crane, spotted hyena, patas monkey, and roan antelope along with transient herds of some of Nigeria's last remaining African bush elephants. However, a section of the park, the Sambisa Forest, was taken over during the Boko Haram insurgency in the early 2010s forcing many fauna to flee; large animals were not seen until 2019 and 2020 when a massive herd of migratory elephants returned to Borno.

Borno State as a territory has been inhabited for centuries by various ethnic groups, including the Dghwede, Glavda, Guduf, Laamang, Mafa, and Mandara in the central region; the Afade, Yedina (Buduma), and Kanembu in the extreme northeast; the Waja in the extreme south; and the Kyibaku, Kamwe, Kilba, and Margi groups in the south while the Kanuri and Shuwa Arabs live throughout the state's north and centre. Religiously, the vast majority of the state's population (~85%) are Muslim with smaller Christian and traditionalist minorities (especially in the south) at around 7% each.

From the 700s, what is now Borno State was within the territory of the Kanem Empire, an empire spanning from modern-day southern Libya (Fezzan) south through most of now-Chad into modern-day Borno State. In the late 1300s, the Kanem Empire was forced to move after unsuccessful wars, becoming the Bornu Empire before regaining strength and ruling the wider area for the next 500 years. It was not until the early 1800s when the Fulani jihad significantly weakened the Empire, that Bornu began to decline. Much of modern-day southern Borno State was seized in the wars and incorporated into the Adamawa Emirate under the Sokoto Caliphate. About 80 years later, Rabih az-Zubayr, a Sudanese warlord, conquered the Empire and ruled until he was killed by French forces in the 1900 Battle of Kousséri. The Adamawa Emirate was also defeated by colonial powers, losing the Adamawa Wars to Germany and the British Empire. Both Rabih's lands (later reconstituted as the Borno Emirate) and the Adamawa Emirate were then divided among colonial powers with modern-day Borno State being split between Germany and the British Empire.

The British-controlled area was incorporated into the Northern Nigeria Protectorate which later merged into British Nigeria before becoming independent as Nigeria in 1960. The German-controlled area (territory along the modern-day border with Cameroon) formed Deutsch-Bornu as a part of German Kamerun until allied forces invaded and occupied Kamerun during the Kamerun campaign of World War I. After the war, what is now the eastern periphery of Borno State became a part of the Northern Cameroons within the British Cameroons until 1961, when a referendum led to a merger with Nigeria. Originally, modern-day Borno State was a part of the post-independence Northern Region until 1967 when the region was split and the area became part of the North-Eastern State. After the North-Eastern State was split, Borno State was formed on 3 February 1976 alongside ten other states. Fifteen years after statehood, a group of LGAs in the state's west was broken off to form the new Yobe State. Years later, the state became the epicentre of the Islamist group Boko Haram since it began its insurgency in 2009. From 2012 to 2015, the insurgency escalated dramatically with much of the state falling under the control of the group, which soon became the world's deadliest terror group in 2015 and forced millions from their homes. Following a 2015 mass multinational offensive along with infighting within the terrorists between the original Boko Haram group and the Islamic State – West Africa Province breakaway, the group was forced from its strongholds into the Sambisa Forest and some islands in Lake Chad by 2017; however, terrorists continue to be a threat statewide with frequent attacks on both civilian and military targets.

As a partially agriculturally-based state, the rural Borno State economy relied heavily on livestock and crops prior to the Boko Haram insurgency while the state capital Maiduguri is a major regional trade and service center. However, after years of the insurgency affecting development and forcing farmers from rural areas in the state, Borno has the thirteenth lowest Human Development Index in the country but as the insurgency has slightly abated since 2016, development has renewed.

== History ==
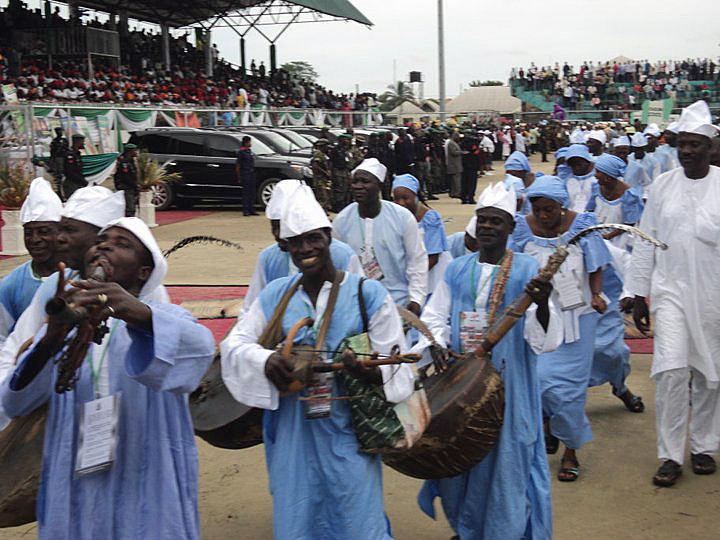
Dancers in Borno state attire

The state has a predominance of Kanuri people, while other ethnic groups such as Lapang, Babur/Bura, Mafa and Marghi are also found in the southern part of the state. Shuwa Arabs are mainly the descendants of Arab people and are an example of the endurance of traditional political institutions in some areas of Africa. The emirs of the former Kanem–Bornu Empire have played a part in the politics of this area for nearly 1,000 years.

The current Kanemi dynasty gained control of the Borno Emirate in the early 19th century after the Fulani jihad of Usman dan Fodio. Conquered by Rabih in 1893, Borno was invaded by the British, French and Germans at the beginning of the 20th century. In 1902, the British officially incorporated Borno into the Northern Nigeria Protectorate and in 1907 established a new capital at Maiduguri, which remains the capital to this day.

After Nigerian independence in 1960, Borno remained fairly autonomous until the number of states in Nigeria expanded to 12 in 1967. Local government reform in 1976 further reduced the power of the emirs of the former dynasty, and by the time of Nigeria's return to civilian rule in 1979, the emirs' jurisdiction has been restricted solely to cultural and traditional affairs. Mala Kachallah was elected governor of Borno State in 1999 under the flagship of the then APP (All Peoples Party), later renamed the All Nigeria People's Party (ANPP). Ali Modu Sheriff was elected governor of Borno State in Nigeria in April 2003.

Boko Haram's insurgency began in 2009, with Borno being the worst-affected area. On 14 May 2013, President Goodluck Jonathan declared a state of emergency in northeastern Nigeria, including Borno State along with the neighboring states of Adamawa and Yobe. This happened after fighting between Boko Haram and the state armed forces killed 200 people in the town of Baga. A spokesman for the armed forces declared that the offensive would continue "as long as it takes to achieve our objective of getting rid of insurgents from every part of Nigeria."

In July 2014, the state's governor Kashim Shettima said that "176 teachers had been killed and 900 schools destroyed since 2011." After the Chibok schoolgirls kidnapping in April 2014, most schools in Borno State were closed.

In November 2014, UNICEF reported it has increased its Community Management of Acute Malnutrition (CMAM) centres in Borno State "from 5 to 67." In Borno State, the agricultural sector has suffered mostly because of the insurgency, and many people have experienced acute food insecurity.

== Climate ==
The climate of Borno state is characteristic of rainfall variability, with a strong latitudinal zone, which is drier in this northeastern state. The commencement of the rainy season in this northeast state is around June/July of every year, which is far behind the southeastern states. The trade wind, also regarded as the harmattan season is often experienced in the state between the months of December and February. There is a reduction in rainfall from 3,800 mm to below 650 mm in the state, hence it rains in the state between 4 and 5 months annually. The state experiences high relative humidity annually. The hottest period in the state is in the month of May, with an average of 34^{o}C while the month of January is the coldest with an annual average of 23^{o}C. The wettest month is August with an average of 118.6 mm while the windiest month is December with an average of 11 km/h.

== Education ==
Borno has many higher institutions, these include:

- Borno State University
- Mohammed Goni College of Legal and Islamic Studies.
- Nigerian Army University Biu
- University of Maiduguri
- Al-Ansar University Maiduguri
- Federal Polytechnic Monguno.
- Federal University of Agricultural Technology Damboa
- Maiduguri College of Nursing and Midwifery.
- Mohamet Lawan College of Agriculture, Maiduguri.
- Shehu Garbai College of health and technology, Maiduguri.
- Ramat Polytechnic, Maiduguri.

== Local Government Areas ==
Borno State consists of twenty-seven (27) Local Government Areas, grouped into three Senatorial Districts (shown below with their areas and 2006 census population figures):

Borno Central Senatorial District	Area in km^{2}	1,666,541	Borno South Senatorial District	Area in km^{2}	1,245,962	Borno North Senatorial District	Area in km^{2}	1,238,390
Maiduguri	137.36	540,016	Askira/Uba	2,431.83	143,313	Abadam	4,172.27	100,065
Ngala	1,519.82	236,498	Bayo	985.78	79,078	Gubio	2,575.09	151,286
Kala/Balge	1,962.13	60,834	Biu	3,423.86	175,760	Guzamala	2,631.44	95,991
Mafa	2,976.99	103,600	Chibok	1,392.00	66,333	Kaga	2,802.46	89,996
Konduga	6,065.89	157,322	Damboa	6,426.18	233,200	Kukawa	5,124.41	203,343
Bama	5,158.87	270,119	Gwoza	2,973.15	276,568	Magumeri	5,057.61	140,257
Jere	900.72	209,107	Hawul	2,160.99	120,733	Marte	3,280.02	129,409
Dikwa	1,836.89	105,042	Kwaya Kusar	754.69	56,704	Mobbar	3,280.02	116,633
			Shani	1,238.93	100,989	Monguno	1,993.20	109,834
						Nganzai	2,572.35	99,074

In addition, there are eight Emirate Councils (Borno, Bama, Damboa, Dikwa, Biu, Askira, Gwoza, Shani and Uba Emirates), which advise the local governments on cultural and traditional matters.

=== Displaced People ===
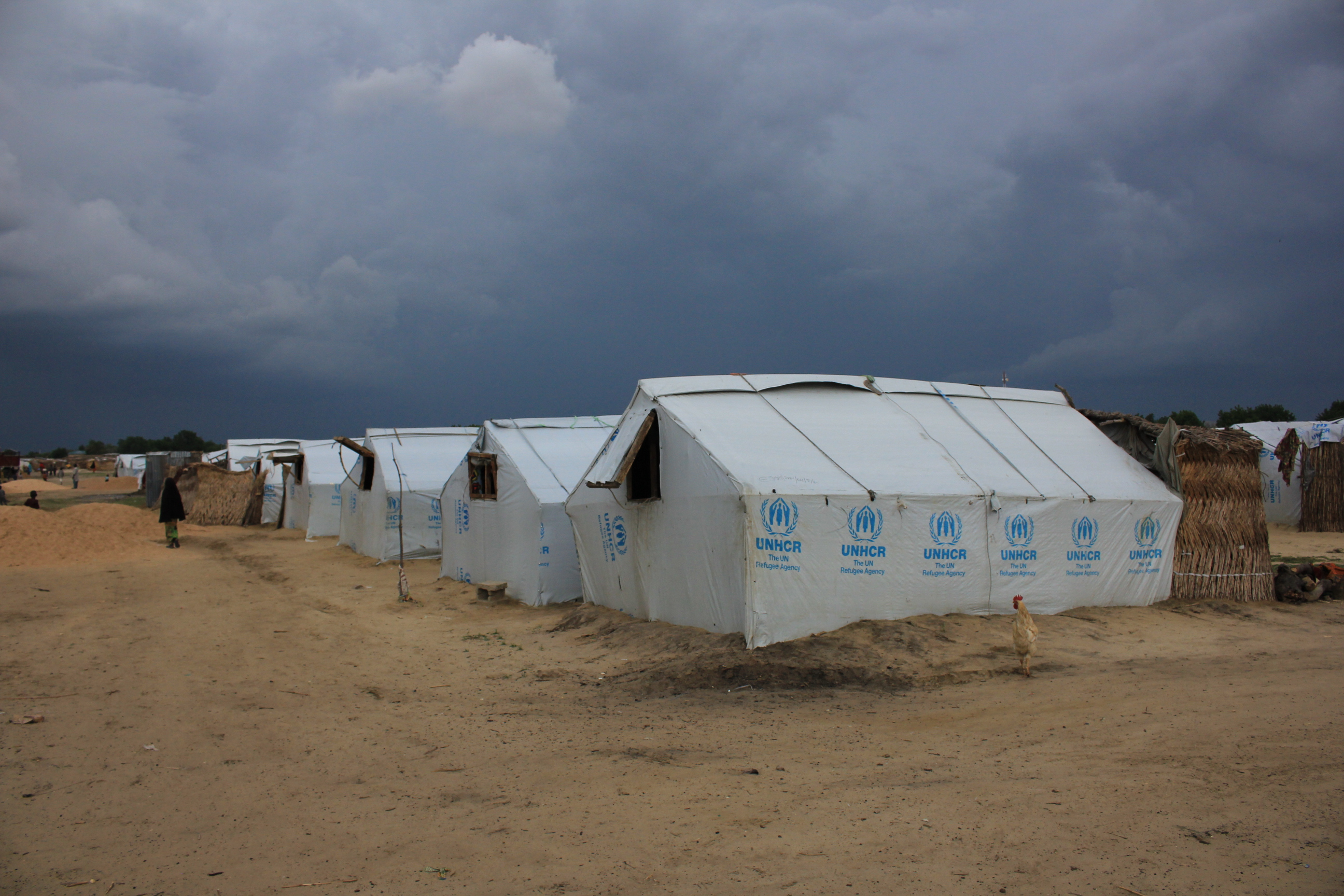
An IDP camp outside Maiduguri from 2018, where internally displaced people come to escape harassment from the Boko Haram insurgency.

Internally displaced person camps in Borno State, Nigeria were centers accommodating Nigerians who had been forced to flee their homes but remain within the country's borders. Displaced persons camps in Maiduguri accommodated from 120,000 to 130,000 people, while those in local government areas ranged above 400,000. There were over two million displaced persons in the state. Internal Displacement Monitoring Centre (IDMC) suggested the figure of internally displaced persons in the state to be 1,434,149, the highest in Northern Nigeria.

== Languages ==
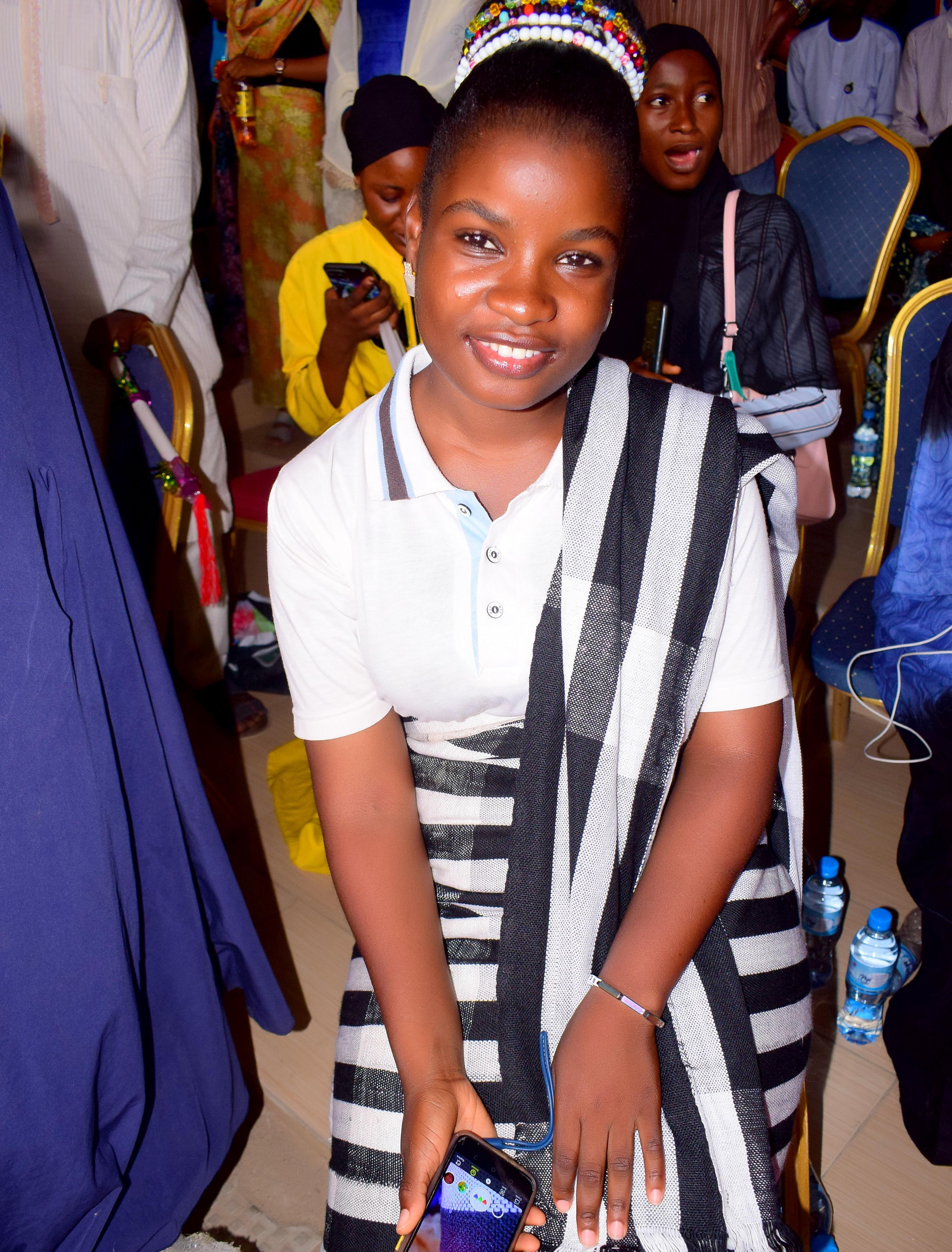
A Bura-Pabir (Babur) woman in a traditional attire

A wide variety of Biu–Mandara languages are spoken in Borno State, particularly in the Mandara Mountains. Languages of Borno State listed by Local Government Area:

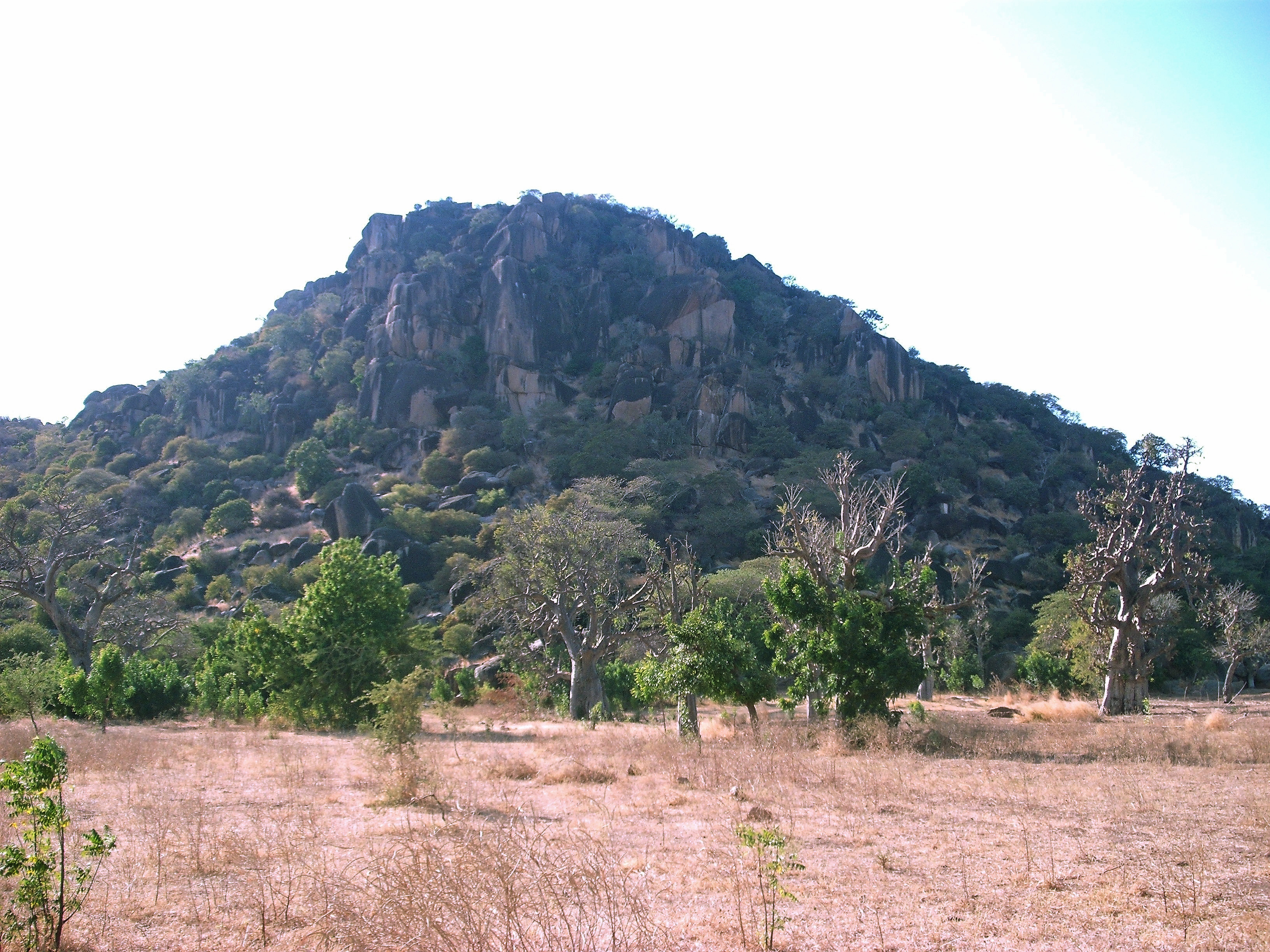
Wamdeo Hill, Borno State

LGA	Languages
Askira-Uba	Putai;Gude; Kibaku; Marghi Central; Marghi South; Nggwahyi; Nya Huba; Marghi
Bama	Shuwa Arabic; Yerwa Kanuri; Wandala; Mafa; Marghi
Biu	Bura-Pabir; Dera; Ga'anda; Jara; Putai,
Chibok	Kibaku; Putai; Marghi
Damboa	Kibaku; Marghi Central; Putai; Mulgwai; Kanuri
Dikwa	Shuwa Arabic
Gwoza	Cineni; Dghwede; Glavda; Guduf-Gava; Gvoko; Hide; Yerwa Kanuri; Lamang; Mafa; Sukur; Waja; Wandala; Marghi Mandara
Hawul	Bura, Hwana,
Kaga	Yerwa Kanuri; Putai
Kala/Balge	Shuwa Arabic; kanuri; Afade; Jilbe (in Jilbe town)
Konduga	Shuwa Arabic; Yerwa Kanuri; Maffa; Putai; Wanda; Marghi
Kukawa	Yerwa Kanuri
Kwaya-Kusar	Bura, Putai, Marghi South Tera
Maiduguri	Yerwa Kanuri; Mafa
Monguno	Yerwa Kanuri; Mafa
Ngala	Shuwa Arabic; Yerwa Kanuri

Other languages of Borno State are Lala-Roba, Tarjumo, Yedina, and Tedaga.

== Religion ==
Islam continues to be the dominant faith practised in Borno State, with much smaller numbers of adherents of Christianity and other faiths spread throughout and living within the region. Sharia operates as the primary foundation for the development, interpretation, and enforcement of most civic codes and laws. The Roman Catholic Diocese of Maiduguri has its seat in the State. The Anglican Diocese of Maiduguri (1990) within the Province of Jos, is led by Bishop Emmanuel Morris (2017). Ekklesiar Yan'Uwa A Nigeria (EYN) buildings in Maiduguri were destroyed by Boko Haram as a part of their uprising, which were later rebuilt.

== Transport ==
Federal Highways are:

- A3 east from Yobe State at Ngamdu via Benisheikh, Maiduguri, Mafa and Dikwa to Gamboru as part of the Trans-Sahel Highway (Trans-African Highway 5),
- A4 north from Numan in Adamawa State at Mada via Biu, Damboa and Bulabulin to A3 near Maiduguri as the Maiduguri-Numan Rd, and then east via Konduga, Kabuiri, and Bama as the Bama-Maiduguri Rd to Cameroon at Banki,
- A13 north from Adamawa State near Limankara via Gwoza Wakane and Burari to A4 near Bama.

Two border crossings to Niger across the Komadougou Yobe:

- Damasak to Difa
- Bisagana to Bosso.

Three roads to Cameroon:

- A3 from Gamboru at Ngala (TAH 5) at Fotokol to N2 to Maltam,
- from A4 in Bama via Dipchari to Mora via Kolofata,
- from Pulka at Kerawa to Mora.

Other major roads include:

- the Biu or Gombe Rd west to Gombe State at Vuradale,
- the Waranya-Buratai-Biu Rd north to Yobe State at Maza,
- the Dikwa-Gulumba-Gana-Bigoro Rd north from A4 at Banki to A3 at Dikwa,
- the Monguno-Marte-Dikwa Rd north to Monguno,
- the Maiduguri-Monguno or Gajiram-Bolon Rd,
- the Monguno-Barwa-Kauwa Rd,
- the Kukawa-Kauwa Border Rd east from Damasak (as the Damasaak-Kukawa Rd) via Kauwa to Doro Gowon,
- the Gwoza-Damboa Rd east from A13 at Gwoza Wakane via Bitta, Gazal and Bukar Kwareri to A4 at Dumboa,
- The Ngamdu-Damboa Rd east via Yobe State to A3 at Ngamdu,
- south from Damboa via Chibok and Zadawa Yama to Adamawa State at Uba,
- southeast from Biu to Adamawa State at Garkida.

Railways:

Maiduguri lies at the terminus of the 1067 mm (3ˈ6") Cape Gauge Eastern Line east from Bauchi in Gombe State.

Airports:

Served by the Maiduguri International Airport.

== Notable people ==
- Ibrahim Ibn Saleh al-Hussaini, Islamic cleric and Mufti
- Mohammed Indimi, businessman
- Baba Gana Kingibe, diplomat and politician
- Sa'id Alkali Kori, entrepreneur and development expert.
- Abba Kyari, businessman and politician
- Abba Kyari, military officer
- Mohammed Ali Ndume, politician
- Kyari Magumeri, soldier
- Zakariya Maimalari, soldier
- Babagana Monguno, military general
- Kashim Shettima, politician and Vice President
- Babagana Zulum, Executive Governor of Borno

== Natural resources ==
Borno State is rich with abundant natural resources, which are highly demanded by industries and for commercial purposes. These include:

- Kaolin
- Clay
- Diatomite
- Trona
- Natural salt
- Iron ore
- Silica sand
- Mica
- Quartz
- Magnetite
- Uranium
- Columbium

== Companies/Industries ==
- Borno textile
- Flex Foam Nigeria Limited
- Simba Industries Limited

== See also ==
- Religion in Borno State
- Islamist insurgency in Nigeria

== Sources ==
- Aborisade, Oladimeji; Robert J. Mundt (2001). Politics in Nigeria. White Plains, New York: Longman. ISBN 9780321085610.
