= Bayo, Borno State =

Bayo
- Local Government Area
- Interactive map of Bayo
- Coordinates: 10.2729°N 11.6613°E
- Country: Nigeria
- State: Borno State
- Headquarters: Fikhayel

Area
  - Total: 956 km^{2} (369 sq mi)
- Elevation: 760 m (2,490 ft)

Population (2006)
  - Total: 78,978
  - Density: 82.6/km^{2} (214/sq mi)
- Time zone: UTC+1 (WAT)
- Postal code: 603

Bayo is a Local Government Area of Borno State, Nigeria. Its headquarters are in the town Fikhayel.

It has an area of 956 km^{2} and a population of 78,978 at the 2006 census. The postal code of the area is 603.

It is one of the four LGAs that constitute the Biu Emirate, a traditional state located in Borno State, Nigeria.

== Demography ==
In a 2023 demographic survey of Internally displaced persons (IDPs), the most commonly reported languages (spoken at homes and places of primary residence) present in the local government area were; Hausa – 66.9%, Eastern Fulfulde – 20.5%, Bura – 8.8% and six other languages spoken by populations below 1% each. This data was not obtained from a nationally co-ordinated population headcount. The last time Nigeria included ethnic and linguistic data in its enumeration parameters was in the national census of 1963.

== Climate/Geography ==
Bayo LGA is located at an elevation of 760 metres (2,500 feet) above sea level and has a total size of 956 square kilometres or 369 square miles. The terrain of the Bayo local government region, which is part of the Savannah belt, is made up of hills and other rock formations. The area's temperature is reported to be 33 °C or 91 °F, with a 13% humidity level.
