= Mafa =

- Local Government Area and town
- Interactive map of Mafa
- Coordinates: 11°55′33″N 13°36′20″E
- Country: Nigeria
- State: Borno State
- Headquarters: Mafa

Government
  - Chairman: Hon. Sunusi Mustapha

Area
  - Total: 2,869 km^{2} (1,108 sq mi)

Population (2006)
  - Total: 3,518
  - Density: 1.226/km^{2} (3.176/sq mi)
- Time zone: UTC+1 (WAT)
- Postal code: 611

Mafa is a town and local government area of Borno State, Nigeria.

== Landscape ==
It has a total landscape area of 2,869 km^{2}

== Population ==
It has a total population of 3,518 at the 2006 census.

== Climate ==
The weather throughout the year fluctuates greatly, with the dry season being oppressively hot and humid and the wet season being hot and partially cloudy.

== Postal code ==
The postal code of the area is 611.

== History ==
It is one of the sixteen LGAs that constitute the Borno Emirate, a traditional state located in Borno State, Nigeria.

== Insurgency cases ==
On 2 February 2015, the Nigerian Army said it had recaptured Mafa from Boko Haram, along with the nearby towns of Gamboru, Abadam, Mallam Fatori, and Marte, following joint military operations by Nigerian and Cameroonian forces, civilian forces, and three days of Chadian airstrikes.
