= Gubio =

- Local Government Area and town
- Interactive map of Gubio
- Coordinates: 12°29′51″N 12°46′48″E
- Country: Nigeria
- State: Borno State
- Headquarters: Gubio

Area
  - Total: 2,464 km^{2} (951 sq mi)

Population (2006)
  - Total: 152,778
  - Density: 62.00/km^{2} (160.6/sq mi)
- Time zone: UTC+1 (WAT)
- Postal code: 602

Gubio, also Gobiyo, is a town and local government area of Borno State, in northeastern Nigeria.

It has an area of 2,464 km^{2} and a population of 152,778 at the 2006 census.

The postal code of the area is 602.

The primary road through Gubio runs north towards Damasak and south towards Maiduguri. Gubio is about 97 kilometres (60 miles) from each of those two settlements.

It is one of the sixteen LGAs that constitute the Borno Emirate, a traditional state located in Borno State, Nigeria.

== Massacre ==
On 9 June 2020, a group of gunmen killed 81 people in a massacre. The killers are believed to be from the jihadist group Boko Haram, whose insurgency began in 2009.

== Climate ==
The annual temperature in Gubio, Nigeria's Subtropical steppe region, is 31.59 °C (88.86 °F), 2.13% higher than the country's average, with 35.73 mm (1.407 in) of precipitation and 60.47 days with rain.

Gubio's climate is becoming warmer due to climate change, with both warmer and colder weather.

Gubio has a predominantly hot and dry climate, with very limited rainfall occurring mainly between June and early September. The rest of the year is dry, with Harmattan winds reducing visibility and humidity. Temperatures typically vary between 27 °C (80 °F) and 41 °C (105 °F), and annual rainfall rarely exceeds 500–600 millimetres (20–24 inches).
