= Mobbar =

- Local Government Area
- Interactive map of Mobbar
- Country: Nigeria
- State: Borno State
- Headquarters: Damasak

Government
  - Executive Chairman: Hon. Mohammed M. Aji

Area
  - Total: 2,790 km^{2} (1,080 sq mi)

Population (2006)
  - Total: 116,654
  - Density: 41.8/km^{2} (108/sq mi)
- Time zone: UTC+1 (WAT)
- Postal code: 602

Mobbar is a Local Government Area of Borno State, Nigeria. Its headquarters are in the town of Damasak.

It has an area of 2,790 km^{2} and a population of 116,654 at the 2006 census.

The postal code of the area is 602.

It is one of the sixteen LGAs that constitute the Borno Emirate, a traditional state located in Borno State, Nigeria.

== Business ==
Mobbar shares boundaries with the republic of Niger, as a result most agricultural commodities such as fish, pepper and tomato are exported through her border.

Tourism: The san-san dunes is situated in the outskirts of the local government which will be a site of tourism if further developed.

== Politics ==
Mobbar is a birthplace to prominent leaders and politicians among the notable ones are; former Governor of Borno State late Alh. Mohammed Goni, former military Administrator Late. Brig.Gen. Abba Kyari rtd, Sen. Abubakar Kyari, former senator representing Borno North senatorial district the current Minister of Agriculture and Food Security Federal Republic of Nigeria, Hon Mohammed M Aji (M Gas) Borno State Ambassador to Niger Republic, former two term care-taker Chairman, Retired Council Secretary, and Current Executive Chairman.

== Climate/Geography ==
The Mobbar Local Government Area (LGA) has a total area of 2790 square kilometres (1080 square miles), an average temperature of 33 °C (91 °F), two distinct seasons—the dry and the rainy—and an estimated average wind speed of 11 km/h.

Mobbar experiences a hot desert-bordering semi-arid climate with low rainfall and extreme temperatures. The short rainy season from June to September brings most of the annual precipitation, which rarely exceeds 500 mm (20 in). Temperatures typically range from 25 °C (77 °F) to 43 °C (109 °F).
