= Marte, Nigeria =

Marte
- Local Government Area and town
- Interactive map of Marte
- Country: Nigeria
- State: Borno State
- Headquarters: Marte

Area
  - Total: 3,154 km^{2} (1,218 sq mi)

Population (2006)
  - Total: 129,370
  - Density: 41.02/km^{2} (106.2/sq mi)
- Time zone: UTC+1 (WAT)
- Postal code: 611

Marte is a town and Local Government Area of Borno State, Nigeria, on the western coast of Lake Chad.

It has an area of 3,154 km^{2} and a population of 129,370 at the 2006 census.

The postal code of the area is 611.

It is one of the sixteen LGAs that constitute the Borno Emirate, a traditional state located in Borno State, Nigeria. The traditional head of Marte is the mai of Marte, claimed to be one of the oldest continuous political offices in Borno State.

== Agriculture ==
In 2013, according to PM News,

5,000 hectares (12,355 acres) of wheat and rice were left to rot in the Marte area of Borno near Lake Chad after 19,000 farmers abandoned their farms. “We lost 200 metric tonnes of wheat as a result of the exodus,” said Abubakar Gabra Iliya, head of the Lake Chad Basin Development Agency, based in the Borno state capital, Maiduguri. A 2012 NEMA report said that violence linked to the Boko Haram insurgency has caused 60 percent of farmers to leave the fertile region.

== Climate ==
The annual temperature in Marte, Nigeria's Subtropical steppe climate, is 34.39 °C (93.9 °F), with 38.89 millimetres or 1.531 inches of precipitation and 65.83 wet days.

Marte has a hot semi-arid climate typical of communities near the Lake Chad basin. Rainfall is low and occurs mainly between June and September, while the long dry season extends from October through May. Temperatures remain high throughout the year, generally between 26 °C or 79 °F and 42 °C or 108 °F.

== Boko Haram violence ==
In May 2014, Boko Haram attacked villages in Marte LGA, according to The Punch. Kirenowa town had about 20 deaths, with one observer stating that over 60 houses were burnt. In the town of Ngurmuji, over 40 deaths were reported.

In Gurmushi Village, a "remote border community" on the Nigeria-Cameroon border, 40 deaths were reported. However, this claim could not be verified as of May 28.

On 2 February 2015, the Nigerian Army said it had recaptured Marte from Boko Haram, along with the nearby towns of Gamboru, Mafa, Mallam Fatori, and Abadam, following joint military operations by Nigerian and Cameroonian forces, civilian forces, and three days of Chadian airstrikes. However, in August 2016, Borno State government stated that Marte still hadn't been fully cleared of Boko Haram control.

On 16 January 2021, Islamic State West Africa Province (ISWAP) fighters armed with machine guns overran the military base in Marte. ISWAP said seven were killed and one person was captured. They said they seized weapons, ammunition, six-wheel vehicles, and burned down the barracks.
