= June 2014 Borno State attacks =

Terrorist incident in Nigeria

From 20 to 23 June 2014, a series of attacks occurred in Borno State, Nigeria. 91 women and children were kidnapped in the attacks and more than 70 people were killed.

== Background ==
Boko Haram is an Islamic terrorist group opposed to what it considers to be the Westernization of Nigeria, which they have stated is the root cause of criminal behaviour in the country. Thousands of people have been killed in attacks perpetrated by the group, and the federal government declared a state of emergency in May 2013 in Borno State in its fight against the insurgency. The resulting crackdown, however, has failed to stabilise the country.

Boko Haram's attacks have intensified in 2014. In February, the group killed more than 100 Christian men in the villages of Doron Baga and Izghe. Also in February, 59 boys were killed in the Federal Government College attack in Yobe State.

By mid-April, Boko Haram had been blamed for nearly 4,000 deaths in 2014. Militants then attacked a school and kidnapped 276 girls, of which 57 escaped, in Chibok. The incident brought international attention on the situation in Nigeria, and Western nations promised to help fight Boko Haram. Negotiations to trade the girls for captured militants took place, but the talks stalled and president Goodluck Jonathan announced the government would not consider a trade. As of June, the girls were still unaccounted for. The Nigerian military says they are aware of where the girls are being held, but are afraid to use force for fear that Boko Haram will kill the girls if attacked. Vigilante groups have formed throughout the North, with modest success in repelling attacks.

Attacks, however, have continued. On 20 May 118 people were killed in a pair of bombings in Jos. The following day, two dozen people were killed in a raid on a village. On 1 June, around 40 people were killed in a bombing in Mubi. On June 2, 2014, in an event that has been called the Gwoza massacre, "No fewer than 300 villagers were reportedly killed in three communities around Gwoza local government area of Borno State".

== Kidnappings ==
Over several days, around the weekend of 21–22 June, suspected Boko Haram militants attacked the village of Kummabza and three others in the Damboa district of Borno State, according to eyewitnesses. The attackers took 60 women and girls, and 31 boys in the attack. Some of the women were married and the children were as young as three. Vigilante leader Aji Khalil said four villagers who tried to escape the attackers were shot. An eyewitness said closer to 30 men had been killed in the attack.

After the attack, elderly villagers walked 15 miles (24 km) to report the attack and seek help. Borno governor Kashim Shettima ordered an official probe, but when the news leaked the national government denied any abductions had taken place. A government spokesperson stated there was "nothing on the ground to prove any act of abduction" and claimed Shettima had determined the missing women had merely moved to another village. A local politician and multiple eyewitnesses, however confirmed the abduction report to Agence France-Presse. On condition of anonymity, an intelligence officer with Nigeria's Department of State Security confirmed to the Associated Press that an attack had taken place. However, he reported that the abductions had taken place a week earlier, between 13 and 15 June.

== Bombings and shootings ==
On 21 and 22 June, suspected Boko Haram militants attacked the villages of Chuha A, Chuha B, and Korongilim near Chibok. The attackers were met by military and vigilante resistance. The towns were destroyed and at least 40 villagers were killed in the fighting. Six vigilantes and about twenty-five militants were also killed in the attacks. A government official described the scene: "Corpses of affected people ... littered the three villages."

On 23 June, a bomb explosion at a college in Kano killed 8 people and injured about 20 others. On the night of 28 June, a bomb exploded at a brothel in Bauchi that resulted in 11 deaths and 28 injuries.

== Analysis ==
Analyst Jacob Zenn suggested the new attacks showed that international efforts to launch a counterattack against Boko Haram were stalled. Security analyst Ryan Cumming said the new kidnappings may be an attack to direct attention from the Chibok kidnappings, and to intensify pressure to make a hostage exchange deal.

== Aftermath ==
On 7 July 2014, it was reported that more than 60 of the kidnapped women had escaped from Boko Haram.
