= June 2014 Kaduna and Abuja attacks =

Terrorist incident in Nigeria

Coordinates: 9.0667°N 7.4833°E

June 2014 central Nigeria attacks
- Part of the Boko Haram insurgency
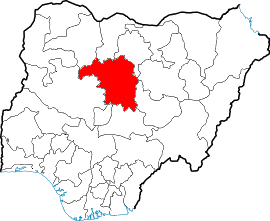
- Location: Abuja and villages of Kaduna State, Nigeria
- Date: 23–25 June 2014 (GMT+1)
- Attack type: Shootings, bombing
- Deaths: 100+

Between 23 and 25 June 2014, a series of attacks occurred in central Nigeria. On 23–24 June, gunmen attacked a number of villages in Kaduna State, killing around 150 people. The attack was blamed on Fulani tribesmen. On 25 June 2014, a bomb exploded at the Emab Plaza in the national capital of Abuja, killing at least 21 people. In response to the bombing, the Nigerian military raided two militants camps on 26 June, killing more than 100 people.

== Background ==
Over 20,000 people have been killed in Nigeria between 2009 and 2014 during an Islamist insurgency, led by the militant group Boko Haram. Boko Haram opposes the Westernization of Nigeria, which they believe is the root cause of criminal behaviour in the country. The federal government declared a state of emergency in May 2013 in Borno State in its fight against the insurgency. The resulting crackdown, however, has failed to stabilise the country.

Boko Haram's attacks have intensified in 2014. In February, the group killed more than 100 Christian men in the villages of Doron Baga and Izghe. Also in February, 59 boys were killed in the Federal Government College attack in Yobe State.

By mid-April, Boko Haram had been blamed for nearly 4,000 deaths in 2014. Militants then attacked a school and kidnapped 276 girls, of which 57 escaped, in Chibok. The incident brought international attention on the situation in Nigeria, and Western nations promised to help fight Boko Haram. However, attacks continued. On 20 May, 118 people were killed in a pair of bombings in Jos. The following day, two dozen people were killed in a raid on a village. Vigilante groups have subsequently formed throughout the North, with modest success in repelling attacks.

Attacks in Gwoza LGA, Borno State, are difficult to confirm due to poor communications.

Additionally, Nigeria has also had attacks by MEND.

== Kaduna village attacks ==
On 23 June 2014, gunmen attacked the villages of Kabamu and Ankpong in Kaduna State, killing 38 people according to vigilante leader Christopher Chisom. Governor Ramalan Yero confirmed the attack, although reported the villages attacked as Fadan Karshi and Nandu. He said 17 villagers had been killed around 10 pm in Fadan Karshi, with two assailants captured or killed. At 2am, 21 people were killed in Nandu by the same gunmen. "Many" others were injured, although an exact figure was unavailable. The president of the Ninzon Progressive Youths organisation said a threatening letter from the Fulani had warned of the attack earlier in the month.

Elsewhere that evening, additional gunmen attacked seven other villages: Dogon-Daji, Gani, Hayin-Kwanta, Kabani, Kabamu, Kobin, and Naidu. According to Chisom, a total of 123 additional people were killed in the overnight raids: 38 in Kobin, 30 in Kabamu, 21 in Dogon-Daji, 16 in Naidu, 9 in Gani, 5 in Hayin Kwanta, and 4 in Kabani. The Christian Association of Nigeria (CAN) also reported that at least 100 people had been killed in the attacks. According to reports, two of the attackers were wearing police uniforms. No official death toll has been released.

The perpetrators' identity is unclear, although three Fulani herdsmen were arrested in connection with the attack on 25 June. A CAN spokesperson remarked "I believe that they are terrorists because the Fulani that we live with cannot do this thing." He also said that the chanting indicated the attack was motivated by religion. Three AK-47s and 158 rounds of ammunition were confiscated in the arrests. The Sanga Local Government Area declared a 24-hour curfew in response to the attacks.

== Emab Plaza bombing ==
An explosion occurred at the Emab Plaza, a busy shopping center, in Abuja just before 16:00 on 25 June near federal government offices. The blast, which occurred during peak traffic hours, resulted in billowing smoke. An eyewitness reported: "We heard a really loud noise and the building shook ...We saw the smoke and people covered in blood. It was just chaos." According to official reports, at least 21 people were killed in the attack. The Premium Times reported there were at least 30 deaths with a likelihood of more casualties. More than 50 people were injured in the attack.

A suspect attempting to flee the scene was shot and killed. A bag he was carrying contained additional explosives. On 26 June, the Multinational Joint Task Force responded to the attack by raiding two militant camps. According to the Minister of Defense, roughly 50 militants were killed at each location. Two soldiers were killed in the raids. President Goodluck Jonathan cut short an African Union meeting to meet with families of the blast victims on 27 June. "Nigerians are struggling, thinking about how to contribute to [the] nation's development and working very hard to take care of their families [while] others are busy to kill people," he remarked.

No claim of responsibility was made, but media reports generally linked the bombing to Boko Haram. A week earlier, government intelligence indicated the group was planning to hijack gasoline trucks and drive them into the capital, strapped with improvised explosive devices.
