= The Jos Forum Inter-communal Dialogue Process =

The Jos Forum Inter-communal Dialogue Process refers to a peace process undertaken by communities living in Jos, Plateau State, Nigeria.

Since 2001, Jos has been the site of riots and communal violence leading to significant death and displacement estimated well into the thousands.

The Jos Forum dialogue process spanned 16 months from August 2013 - December 2014, ultimately leading to a "Declaration of Commitment to Peace" signed by the participating communities (Afizere, Anaguta, Berom, Fulani, Hausa, Igbo, South-South and Yoruba, as well as women who were represented as their own distinct community).

== Background ==
The ‘Middle Belt’ region of Nigeria refers to the imprecise dividing line between a mostly Muslim north and the mainly Christian south. Surrounded by divergent religious, economic, and cultural histories, the middle belt has been the melting pot where small and large ethno-religious groups in Nigeria have long coexisted, but where they have also increasingly collided over land, resources, identity and political power. In particular, Jos city in Plateau State has been a centre for ethno-religious disputes and violence since the 1990s. The Nigerian state responded to these episodes of violence by either launching security force operations (military and police) or by establishing commissions of inquiry at the Federal and State levels of Government. However, independent reports have observed that these actions have not achieved permanent security and the Nigerian Government itself stated that recommendations by the commissions of inquiry were not followed up: "[The 2010 Presidential Advisory Committee on the Jos Crisis] found that the recommendations of the previous reports on past crises in the State had not been implemented".

== Dialogue Process ==
Following the numerous previous attempts to resolve conflict in Jos, the Centre for Humanitarian Dialogue (HD) launched a community-driven process in 2013, which was steered by the main protagonists and the victims of conflict - the local communities (Afizere, Anaguta, Berom, Fulani, Hausa, Igbo, South-South, Yoruba. In addition, women were participating as their own distinct community). Over the course of 16 months, HD convened a series of discussions on several issues of concern, including:

- Trust building and religious tolerance.
- Rebuilding places of worship, and access to burial grounds
- Issues relating to youth and unemployment
- Governance issues
- Traditional rulership issues
- Jos City issues such as ownership and indigeneship
- Countryside issues such as cattle rustling and land disputes
- Impunity, reparations and compensation.
- Securing lives and property

Following each dialogue session, the forum developed recommendations, which ultimately formed the basis of the implementation phase of the project.

== Outcomes ==
The dialogue process culminated in a ceremony held in Jos on 12 December 2014 to mark the achievements of the forum and to launch the implementation phase of the project. The ceremony was attended by representatives of the government, civil society and prominent members of the concerned communities. It culminated in the signing of a Joint Declaration of Commitment to Peace.

The declaration begins with a general description of the consensus reached, but goes on to commit the signatory communities to cooperate for the sake of peace:

"During the dialogue sessions, we learned much about each other’s fears and desires, and have come to recognize several general truths, including that tolerance and respect serve as the foundation for peaceful living; dialogue rather than violence is the preferred means of resolving disputes; and that uniting around common values and ideals can achieve more progress and development than emphasizing differences. Further, we agreed that the actions of individuals should not be attributed to communities as a whole. Instead, our communities should work together to prevent wicked and criminal-minded individuals and small groups from wrecking any more havoc in our city and its environs."

The endorsed recommendations committed the communities to pursue their implementation in coordination with Federal, State, and Local Governments and civil society. One of the activities involved the reconstruction and rehabilitation of several destroyed schools, churches and mosques.

The communities took further initiative to legally register the "Jos Peace Dialogue Forum" as a recognized Nigerian non-profit, to serve as a sustainable and impartial dialogue mechanism to be used by the communities to handle disputes. In 2015, the Jos Peace Dialogue Forum has already served as a platform for various political parties to discuss challenges and commit to peaceful elections in 2015.

== See also ==
- 2001 Jos riots
- 2008 Jos riots
- 2010 Jos riots
- 2014 Jos bombings
- Kafanchan Peace Declaration
