= Jos massacre =

Jos massacre may refer to:

- 2001 Jos riots
- 2008 Jos riots
- 2010 Jos riots
- 2010 Jos bombings
- 2014 Jos bombings
- 5 July 2015 Nigeria attacks
