= Jos riots =

Jos riots can refer to:

- 2001 Jos riots
- 2008 Jos riots
- 2010 Jos riots
