= Cineni (disambiguation) =

Cineni may refer to:

- The village of Cineni in Gwoza, Borno State, Nigeria.
- The Cineni language
