= Fall of Gwoza =

- Part of Boko Haram insurgency
| Date | 6 August 2014 |
| Location | Gwoza, Borno State, Nigeria |
| Result | Boko Haram victory: Gwoza declared headquarters of Boko Haram's caliphate |
| Territorial changes | Gwoza LGA falls under Boko Haram control |

Belligerents
| Nigeria; Civilian Joint Task Force | Boko Haram |

Commanders and leaders
| Unknown | Abubakar Shekau; Mohammed Bashir |

Strength
| 350 soldiers | Unknown |

Casualties and losses
| Unknown | Unknown |
- 600-1,000+ civilians killed 5,000 civilians displaced

On 6 August 2014, militants from Boko Haram stormed the town of Gwoza, Borno State, Nigeria, seizing control of the city. The militants destroyed government buildings and churches, and massacred fleeing civilians in villages in and around Gwoza. At least 600 civilians were killed in the aftermath of the fall of the city.

The fall of Gwoza was also the first time that Boko Haram, which had pledged bay'ah to the Islamic State on 7 May, declared territory under Boko Haram control as part of the Islamic State's caliphate and de facto independence from Nigeria. The fall of the city and declaration of the caliphate foresaw the seizures of Buni Yadi, Madagali, and other cities in Yobe, Borno, and Adamawa States. Gwoza was declared the headquarters of the militant group until the recapture of the city by Nigerian soldiers in March 2015.

== Background ==
Boko Haram emerged in 2009 as a jihadist social and political movement in a failed rebellion in northeast Nigeria. Throughout the following years, Abubakar Shekau unified militant Islamist groups in the region and continued to foment the rebellion against the Nigerian government, conducting terrorist attacks and bombings in cities and communities across the region.

Gwoza, located on the Nigerian-Cameroonian border, had been attacked several times throughout the Boko Haram insurgency. Gwoza LGA in particular was a hub of Boko Haram activity, particularly in 2014, with the kidnapped Chibok schoolgirls being rumored to be held there. In May 2014, Emir of Gwoza Idrissa Timta was killed in a Boko Haram ambush. The largest attack against Gwoza took place on 2 June 2014, when Boko Haram militants massacred over 500 civilians in villages around Gwoza. Roads into and out of Gwoza were subject to Boko Haram ambushes, and the group had imposed a siege on the LGA since May.

On 7 May, Boko Haram under Abubakar Shekau pledged bay'ah to the Islamic State, then based in Syria and Iraq. They also seized the city of Damboa after the Damboa massacre in July. Several weeks prior to the fall of Gwoza, Boko Haram had sent calls to Muslims in the city urging them of the impending attack. Many civilians told Nigerian soldiers stationed in Gwoza about these impending attacks and plead for them to station in the villages set to be attacked, but the soldiers did not move.

== Battle ==
At the time of the fall, Gwoza had a population of around 200,000. The exact population is unknown due to the amount of refugees from nearby villages that fled to Gwoza combined with the number of residents of Gwoza that fled to other cities like Maiduguri. Boko Haram militants dressed in Nigerian military uniforms stormed the city at 4pm on 6 August, setting fire to government buildings, the town's police station, churches, and other public buildings. Many civilian houses were destroyed in the arson attacks along with the Emir of Gwoza's palace. Survivors claimed that no Nigerian soldiers were present in Gwoza at the time of the fall, and the new Emir of Gwoza Mustapha Idrissa Timta was also nowhere to be found. However, an Amnesty International report showed that 350 soldiers were present in the town during the fall.

At least 70 civilians were killed immediately after the fall of the city. One witness speaking to Amnesty International said that Boko Haram militants began shooting everywhere when they entered the city. Militants on motorcycles shot at civilians, and militants on armored vehicles attacked the military bases. Civilians interviewed by Amnesty said that the army soldiers began fleeing on the evening of 6 August and calling upon civilians to flee into the mountains. While no civilian was spared in the initial attacks on the evening of 6 August, in the days following the attack Boko Haram militants searched the city for any men, who they believed were fighters in the Civilian Joint Task Force (CJTF), pro-government militias. Later estimates said that 600 to over 1,000 civilians were killed by Boko Haram in the attack on Gwoza and subsequent attacks on fleeing refugees in the mountains. Thousands of civilians fled to Maiduguri, Abuja, and Cameroon in the immediate aftermath of the fall. Many more fled to the Sambisa Forest and mountains outside of the city.

Nigerian soldiers at the Maimalari camp in Maiduguri refused orders to deploy to Gwoza on 9 August. Nigerian bombing campaigns of the city began on 11 and 12 August.

On 24 August, while the city was under his control, Boko Haram media released footage of a man (likely Mohammed Bashir) calling himself Abubakar Shekau declared that Gwoza was part of an "Islamic State" that "has nothing to do with Nigeria anymore." Nigerian officials directly disputed Shekau's claim and said that they were launching an offensive to dislodge the militants from Gwoza. In the 25-minute video including Shekau's claim, Boko Haram militants broadcast clips of executions and killings similar to Islamic State propaganda. The Islamic State did not react to these support claims, but said in October 2014 that Boko Haram was among several tentative wilayat that would need a direct line of communication to Abu Bakr al-Baghdadi to be considered a province.

== Aftermath ==
Following the capture of Gwoza, Boko Haram militants seized control of Buni Yadi and Bara in Yobe State, Madagali, Michak, Bazza, and Gulak in Adamawa State, Banki, Gamboru Ngala, Achigachia, Kerawa, Dikwa, and Bama in Borno State all within a span of two weeks. Gamboru Ngala and Bama each were the site of brutal massacres by Boko Haram, with over 200 people killed in Gamboru Ngala and the entire town of Bama displaced. Across their territory, Boko Haram dismissed local emirs and appointed their own emirs. In September 2014, Nigerian forces reported the death of Mohammed Bashir, a spokesman for Boko Haram who called himself Abubakar Shekau.

Gwoza was recaptured on 14 April 2015 as part of the 2015 West African offensive against Boko Haram. By 2017, only a third of Gwoza's original 350,000 residents had returned to the city. Shortly after the recapture of Gwoza, Boko Haram was considered by the central Islamic State to be the Islamic State – West Africa Province (ISWAP), although by this point their territorial gains were diminishing. Throughout 2016, Gwoza was attacked constantly by ISWAP and Shekau's breakaway faction JAS.
