= Slavery in 21st-century jihadism =

Modern slavery by quasi-state-level jihadist groups

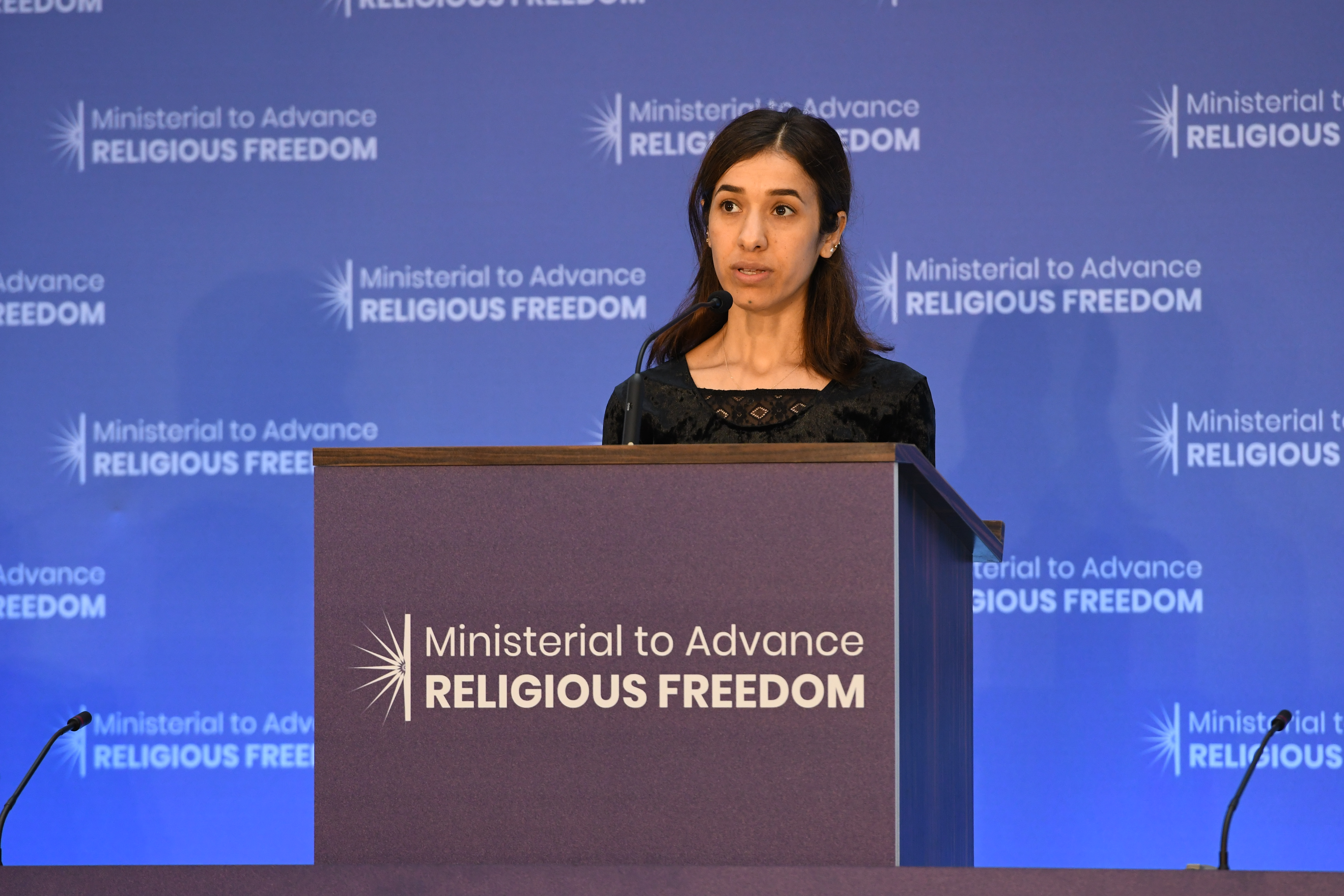
Nadia Murad, a prominent Yazidi human rights activist and survivor of ISIS sexual slavery, delivers remarks at the Ministerial to Advance Religious Freedom at the U.S. Department of State in Washington, D.C.

Quasi-state-level jihadist groups, including Boko Haram and the Islamic State of Iraq and the Levant, have captured and enslaved women and children, often for sexual slavery. In 2014 in particular, both groups organised mass kidnappings of large numbers of girls and younger women.

== Historical background ==
=== Medieval to modern period ===
Slavery was historically deemed a lawful institution in the Muslim world. In various historical interpretations of Islamic law, non-Muslims conquered under Muslim rule could be subject to different legal outcomes, including conversions, payment of the jizya tax, exile and enslavement. and the females among such enslaved non-Muslims are deemed lawful to have sexual relations with - these enslaved females are called, "Ma malakat aymanuhum" which means, "What your right hand possesses".

Slavery was common during the medieval Arab slave trade, in which prisoners of war captured from non-Arab lands often became enslaved. Enslaved women were sometimes used as concubines ; if such a woman gave birth to a child acknowledged by her master, she could attain the status of umm al-walad, meaning she would be freed upon her master’s death.

=== Abolition period ===
Chattel slavery survived longest in the Middle East, and was eventually banned during the 20th-century due to pressure from Western nations and international bodies such as the UN. After the Trans-Atlantic slave trade had been suppressed, the ancient Trans-Saharan slave trade, the Indian Ocean slave trade and the Red Sea slave trade continued to traffic slaves from the African continent to the Middle East. During the 20th century, the issue of chattel slavery was addressed and investigated globally by international bodies created by the League of Nations and the United Nations, such as the Temporary Slavery Commission in 1924–1926, the Committee of Experts on Slavery in 1932, and the Advisory Committee of Experts on Slavery in 1934–1939. By the time of the UN Ad Hoc Committee on Slavery in 1950–1951, legal chattel slavery still existed only in the Arabian Peninsula: in Oman, in Qatar, in Saudi Arabia, in the Trucial States and in Yemen. Legal chattel slavery was finally abolished in the Arabian Peninsula in the 1960s: Saudi Arabia and Yemen in 1962, in Dubai in 1963, and Oman as the last in 1970.

Earlier in the 20th century, Islamist authors declared slavery outdated without actually clearly affirming and promoting its abolition. This has caused at least one scholar (William Clarence-Smith) to criticize the notable "evasions and silences of Muhammad Qutb" and the "dogged refusal of Abul A'la Maududi to give up on slavery".

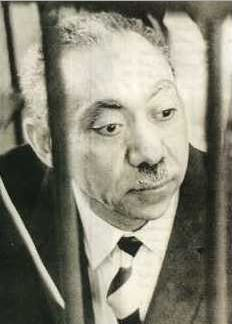
Sayyid Qutb.

Sayyid Qutb, a leading scholar of the Islamist Muslim Brotherhood wrote in his tafsir (commentary of the Quran) that slavery was a way of handling prisoners-of-war and it "was necessary for Islam to adopt a similar line of practise until the world devised a new code of practise during war other than enslavement". Qutb's brother and promoter, Muhammad Qutb, vigorously defended Islamic slavery, telling his audience that "Islam gave spiritual enfranchisement to slaves" and "in the early period of Islam the slave was exalted to such a noble state of humanity as was never before witnessed in any other part of the world." He contrasted the adultery, prostitution, and (what he called) "that most odious form of animalism" casual sex that are found in Europe, with (what he called) "that clean and spiritual bond that ties a maid [i.e. slave girl] to her master in Islam."

Abul A'la Maududi, the founder of Jamaat-e-Islami in the early 20th century, meanwhile wrote:

Islam has clearly and categorically forbidden the primitive practice of capturing a free man, to make him a slave or to sell him into slavery. On this point the clear and unequivocal words of [Muhammad] are as follows:

There are three categories of people against whom I shall myself be a plaintiff on the Day of Judgement. Of these three, one is he who enslaves a free man, then sells him and eats this money" (al-Bukhari and Ibn Majjah).

The words of this Tradition of the Prophet are also general, they have not been qualified or made applicable to a particular nation, race, country or followers of a particular religion.....After this the only form of slavery which was left in Islamic society was the prisoners of war, who were captured on the battlefield. These prisoners of war were retained by the Muslim Government until their government agreed to receive them back in exchange for Muslim soldiers captured by them.....

According to some scholars, there has been a "reopening" of the issue of slavery by some conservative Salafi Islamic scholars after its "closing" earlier in the 20th century when Muslim countries banned slavery and "most Muslim scholars" found the practice "inconsistent with Qur'anic morality."

== 21st-century Islamist revival ==
=== ISIS ===
Islamic State price list for women and children slaves
1–9 years old	$165
10–20	$124
21–30	$82
31–40	$62
41–50	$41
SOURCE: Zainab Bangura, UN special envoy on sexual violence in conflict.

The Economist reported that ISIS, also called the "Islamic State", had taken "as many as 2,000 women and children" captive, selling and distributing them as sexual slaves. Some women were reportedly sold through auctions, including online auctions, to buyers in Saudi Arabia and elsewhere. Matthew Barber, a scholar of Yazidi history at the University of Chicago, later said that he had compiled a list of 4,800 captured Yazidi women and children, and estimated that the total number could be as high as 7,000. Yazidis are a religious minority whose beliefs have been described as drawing on "a mix of Christian, Islamic, and ancient Mesopotamian beliefs".

According to Iraqi MP Vian Dakhil, herself a Yazidi from Sinjar, an estimated 6,383 Yazidis were enslaved and transported to Isis prisons, military training camps, and the homes of fighters across eastern Syria and western Iraq, where they were beaten, sold, and locked away. By mid-2016, 2,590 women and children had escaped or been smuggled out of the caliphate and 3,793 remained in captivity.

Several news organisations reported that captured Yazidi women and girls were subjected to organised sexual slavery. The Daily Telegraph reported that virgins among the captives were selected and given to commanders as sexual slaves. In August 2015, The New York Times reported that the trade in Yazidi women and girls had developed into a structured system, including warehouses where captives were held, rooms where they were inspected and marketed, and buses used to transport them.

In April 2015, Zainab Bangura, the United Nations special envoy on sexual violence in conflict, visited Iraq and was shown an Islamic State pamphlet that included a price list for captured women and children. According to Bloomberg, the authenticity of the list was established by UN researchers who had collected accounts of similar slave markets in Islamic State-controlled territory. The captives were non-Muslim minorities, "mostly Arab Christians and Yazidis", who had refused to convert to Islam and whose adult male relatives had been killed. Bloomberg reported that bidders included Islamic State fighters and wealthy Middle Easterners.

ISIL publicly attempted to justify the enslavement of Yazidi women through its interpretation of Islamic law. According to CNN and The Economist, the group cited Islamic theology to defend the kidnapping and enslavement of women. In an article titled "The Revival of Slavery Before the Hour", published in the ISIL online magazine Dabiq, the group claimed that Yazidi women could be taken captive and forced to become sex slaves or concubines under Islamic law. The article stated that Yazidi women and children were to be divided among Islamic State fighters who participated in the Sinjar operations, and asserted that denying or mocking this practice amounted to apostasy. Another article in Dabiq criticised ISIL supporters who denied that the group had taken slaves and stated that "slave markets will be established". In late 2014, the group released a pamphlet on the treatment of female slaves. Escaped Yazidi women described a system of forced marriage, sexual enslavement, organised rape, and sexual assault under ISIS captivity.

The use of religious arguments to justify enslavement drew condemnation from Muslim scholars. In late September 2014, 126 Islamic scholars from around the world signed an open letter to Islamic State leader Abu Bakr al-Baghdadi, rejecting the group's interpretations of the Qur'an and hadith. The letter accused the group of instigating fitna by reintroducing slavery in violation of the anti-slavery consensus of the Islamic scholarly community.

=== Boko Haram ===
The first report of slave-taking by Boko Haram was on 13 May 2013 when a video was released of Boko Haram leader Abubakar Shekau saying his group had taken women and children - including teenage girls - hostage in response to the arrest of its members' wives and children.

Abubakar Shekau, the leader of Boko Haram, a Nigerian Islamist group, said in an interview "I shall capture people and make them slaves" when claiming responsibility for the 2014 Chibok kidnapping. Shekau has justified his actions by appealing to the Quran saying "[w]hat we are doing is an order from Allah, and all that we are doing is in the Book of Allah that we follow."

According to Islamism expert Jonathan N.C. Hill, Boko Haram began kidnapping large numbers of girls and young women for sexual use in 2014. The attacks echoed kidnappings of girls and young women for sexual use by Algerian Islamists in the 1990s and early 2000s, and may reflect influence by al-Qaeda in the Islamic Maghreb.

According to a community leader from Borno state quoted by the BBC, some captured young women and teenage girls held by Boko Haram have been forced to marry one Boko Haram fighter after another as the fighters are killed. "Any time they go for an operation and one of the fighters is killed they will force the young woman to marry another one ... Eventually she becomes a habitual sex slave."

In response to the Nigerian extremist group Boko Haram's Quranic justification for kidnapping and enslaving people, and ISIL's religious justification for enslaving Yazidi women as spoils of war as claimed in their digital magazine Dabiq, 126 Islamic scholars from around the Muslim world, in late September 2014, signed an open letter to the Islamic State's leader Abu Bakr al-Baghdadi, rejecting his group's interpretations of the Qur'an and hadith to justify its actions. (Note: Abubakar Shekau, the leader of Boko Haram, a Nigerian extremist group, said in an interview "I shall capture people and make them slaves" when claiming responsibility for the 2014 Chibok kidnapping. ISIL claimed that the Yazidi are idol worshipers and their enslavement part of the old shariah practice of spoils of war.) The letter accuses the group of instigating fitna – sedition – by instituting slavery under its rule in contravention of the anti-slavery consensus of the Islamic scholarly community.

=== Allied Democratic Forces ===
According to Amnesty International, the ADF, affiliated with ISIS, has escalated a campaign of extreme violence against civilians, including acts that amount to war crimes and crimes against humanity. In 2019, the group pledged allegiance to ISIS and has since adopted more brutal and systematic tactics to terrorize communities.

ADF Fighters have been reported to have killed civilians, attacked medical facilities, and looted and burned homes. They have abducted men, women and children and forced them to take part in attacks and carry out different roles in the group’s camp and Women and girls have been forced into marriage and pregnancies and compelled to live a life of servitude. The group’s actions amount to war crimes and crimes against humanity.

In April 2023, Nihad Jariri, a senior Al Aan TV journalist, reported on Twitter that according to a leaked document, Allied Democratic Forces (ADF) have engaged in slavery of women and children in Congo.

== See also ==
- Forced marriage
- History of slavery
- Human trafficking
- Islamic sexual jurisprudence
- Raptio – large scale abduction of women
- Sexual jihad
- Sexual slavery § Present day
- History of concubinage in the Muslim world
- Slavery and religion
- Wartime sexual violence
