= Battle of Buni Yadi =

Massacre in Yobe State, Nigeria

Coordinates: 11.2689°N 11.9969°E

- Part of Boko Haram insurgency
Date	26 May 2014
Location	Buni Yadi, Yobe State, Nigeria
Result	Boko Haram victory

Belligerents
Nigeria	Boko Haram

Casualties and losses
45 killed: 24 soldiers; 21 policemen	Unknown
- 2 civilians killed

On 26 May 2014, militants from Boko Haram attacked the town of Buni Yadi, Yobe State, Nigeria, capturing it after a brief battle with Nigerian forces. The capture of the city occurred three months after the massacre in February, where over 59 people were killed at a high school in the city.

== Background ==
Boko Haram emerged in 2009 as a jihadist social and political movement in a failed rebellion in northeast Nigeria. Throughout the following years, Abubakar Shekau unified militant Islamist groups in the region and continued to foment the rebellion against the Nigerian government, conducting terrorist attacks and bombings in cities and communities across the region. Since the start of 2014, the group had carried out 40 attacks leaving 700 people dead.

In February 2014, Boko Haram militants attacked the Federal Government College in Buni Yadi, torching all the buildings of the school and killing over 59 students.

== Battle ==
Before the attack, a large number of insurgents gathered outside the town in disguised Hiluxes, armed with IEDs and rocket launchers. One witness said that the militants had one armored vehicle and at least six pick-ups. The jihadists said assured civilians that they were only there to attack the army, and did not attack civilians. At approximately 8:00 UTC, the militants assaulted a military checkpoint, firing on the soldiers there. Then, they set fire to a local police station and killed police, including the Divisional Police Officer. The military base adjacent to the police station was attacked as well. Several other government buildings along with the house of district chief Abba Hassan were also torched. The jihadists also fired on a primary school in the town, but it was empty. The clashes ended at around 9:00 UTC.

An initial report showed that 31 Nigerian troops, including soldiers and police officers, were killed in the battle. On 27 May, the death toll was revised to say 24 soldiers and 21 policemen were killed in the battle. Two civilians were killed as well. No casualties were mentioned for Boko Haram.

== Aftermath ==
It is not known for how long the militants stayed in Buni Yadi after overrunning it. In July 2014, a chemist and traditional ruler were kidnapped by Boko Haram from the town. On 22 August, two weeks after the fall of Gwoza, Boko Haram captured and retained control of Buni Yadi.
