= Battle of Gwoza (2015) =

- Part of Boko Haram insurgency
Date	24–27 March 2015
Location	Gwoza, Borno State, Nigeria
Result	Nigerian victory

Belligerents
Nigeria	Islamic State - West Africa Province

Casualties and losses
Unknown	Heavy (per Nigeria)
- 75+ civilians killed

Between 24 and 27 March 2015, Nigerian and allied forces recaptured Gwoza from Boko Haram, which had recently pledged allegiance to the Islamic State and became the Islamic State – West Africa Province. Several months prior, after the fall of the city to Boko Haram, Abubakar Shekau declared an Islamic caliphate from Gwoza.

== Background ==
Boko Haram emerged in 2009 as a jihadist social and political movement in a failed rebellion in northeast Nigeria. Throughout the following years, Abubakar Shekau unified militant Islamist groups in the region and continued to foment the rebellion against the Nigerian government, conducting terrorist attacks and bombings in cities and communities across the region.

On 6 August 2014, Boko Haram stormed Gwoza and massacred 600 civilians in the city. The city became the de facto capital of Boko Haram between August 2014 and March 2015, and amid the 2015 West African offensive, was one of the last strongholds of Boko Haram in northeastern Nigeria. Between November 2014 and February 2015, more than 1,500 women and children were abducted by Boko Haram from Gwoza LGA. Many civilians were tortured and detained in makeshift prisons under Boko Haram control.

On 25 August 2015, Abubakar Shekau speaking in Gwoza declared an Islamic caliphate in northeast Nigeria. Boko Haram pledged allegiance to the Islamic State on 7 March, becoming the Islamic State – West Africa Province (ISWAP).

== Battle ==
At the start of March 2015, amid losses to Nigerian and allied forces in Dikwa, Damasak, and Gamboru Ngala, ISWAP began rounding up and slaughtering civilians in Gwoza. At least 75 people were killed in this first massacre. Many of the fighters who perpetrated this massacre were gathered from surrounding villages, and anybody who didn't fight was shot. As Nigerian forces got closer to Gwoza, Shekau gave an order on 15 March to massacre all of the women in the city, including pregnant women. According to a former ISWAP fighter present at the massacre, Shekau said if the fighters didn't massacre the women the fighters wouldn't find them in jannah.

After bombarding the city for several days, Nigerian forces launched an offensive on Gwoza on 24 March. Two towns near Gwoza, Limakara and Pulka, were quickly taken. On 27 March, the Nigerian Army announced it had fully recaptured Gwoza and killed a lot of jihadists. The city was filled with corpses of civilians and fighters killed in the carnage for weeks after the massacre and battle.
