= Chibok schoolgirls kidnapping =

2014 kidnapping by Boko Haram

- Part of the Boko Haram insurgency
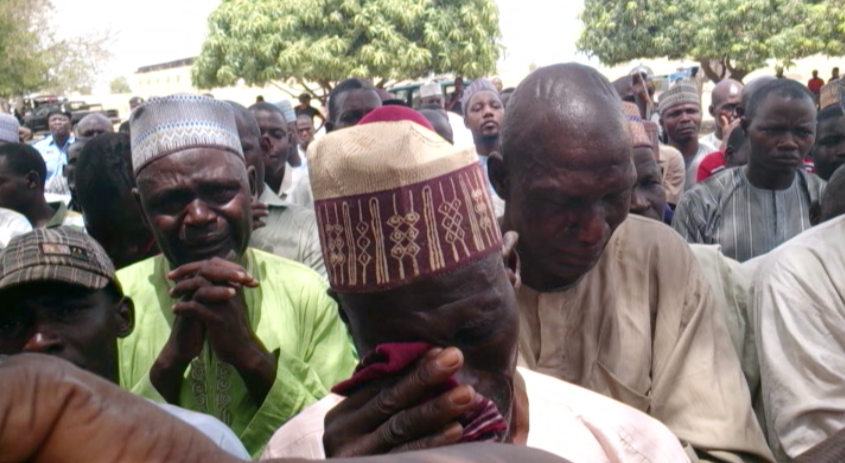
- Parents of the kidnapped girls
- Date: 14 April 2014
- Location: Chibok in Borno State, Nigeria; 10°52′55″N 12°50′17″E
- Perpetrator: Boko Haram
- Outcome: 276 female students abducted
- Missing: 82 (as of 14 April 2024)

On the night of 14–15 April 2014, 276 mostly Christian, with some Muslim, schoolgirls aged from 16 to 18 were kidnapped by the Nigerian militant group Boko Haram from the Government Girls Secondary School in the town of Chibok in Borno State, Nigeria. Prior to the raid, the school had been closed for four weeks due to deteriorating security conditions, but the girls were in attendance to take final exams in physics.

After the incident, 57 schoolgirls immediately escaped by jumping from the trucks on which they were being transported, and others have been rescued by the Nigerian Armed Forces on various occasions. Amina Ali, one of the missing girls, was found in May 2016. She claimed that the remaining girls were still there, but that six had died. On 14 April 2021, seven years after the initial kidnapping, over 100 of the girls remained missing. As of 14 April 2024, ten years after the kidnapping, 82 of the girls remained missing and presumed captive.

Some have described their capture in appearances at international human rights conferences. Boko Haram has used the girls as negotiating pawns in prisoner exchanges, offering to release some girls in exchange for some of their captured commanders in jail.

The girls kidnapped in Chibok in 2014 are only a small percentage of the total number of people abducted by Boko Haram. Amnesty International estimated in 2015 that at least 2,000 women and girls had been abducted by the group since 2014, many of whom had been forced into sexual slavery.

== Background ==
The militant group Boko Haram seeks to institute an Islamic caliphate in Nigeria and is in particular opposed to western-style modern education, which they say lures people away from following Islamic teaching as a way of life. By 2014, tens of thousands of people had been killed in attacks perpetrated by the group, and the Nigerian federal government declared a state of emergency in May 2013 in the states of Borno, Yobe and Adamawa during its fight against the insurgency. The resulting crackdown led to the capture or killing of hundreds of Boko Haram members, with the remainder retreating to mountainous areas from which they began increasingly to target civilians. However, the campaign failed to stabilise the country. A French military operation in Mali also pushed Boko Haram and AQIM militants into Nigeria.

The location of Borno State in northeast Nigeria

Boko Haram began to target schools in 2010, killing hundreds of students by 2014. A spokesperson for the group said such attacks would continue as long as the Nigerian government continued to interfere with traditional Islamic education. At the time, approximately 10,000 children were unable to attend school as a result of activities by Boko Haram. Boko Haram has also been known to kidnap girls, whom it believes should not be educated, and use them as cooks or sex slaves.

On 6 July 2013, armed men from Boko Haram attacked Government Secondary School in Mamudo, Yobe State, killing at least 42 people. Most of those killed were students, with some staff members among the dead. On 29 September 2013, armed men from Boko Haram gained access to the male hostel in the College of Agriculture in Gujba, Yobe State, killing forty-four students and teachers.

Boko Haram's attacks intensified in 2014. In February, the group killed more than 100 Christian men in the villages of Doron Baga and Izghe. That same month, 59 boys were killed in the Federal Government College attack in northeastern Nigeria. In March, the group attacked the Giwa military barracks, freeing captured militants. The Chibok abduction occurred on the same day as a bombing attack in Abuja in which at least 88 people died. The road leading to Chibok is frequently targeted due to the fact that there is little to no government protection for commuters for the village. Boko Haram was blamed for nearly 4,000 deaths in 2014. Training received from al-Qaeda in the Islamic Maghreb and al Qaeda in the Arabian Peninsula has helped Boko Haram intensify its attacks.

Jonathan N.C. Hill of King's College London has suggested that Boko Haram kidnapped these girls after coming increasingly under the influence of al-Qaeda in the Islamic Maghreb, and asserts that the group's goal is to use girls and young women as sexual objects and as a means of intimidating the civilian population into compliance. Hill describes the attacks as similar to the kidnapping of girls in Algeria in the 1990s and early 2000s.

== Kidnapping ==
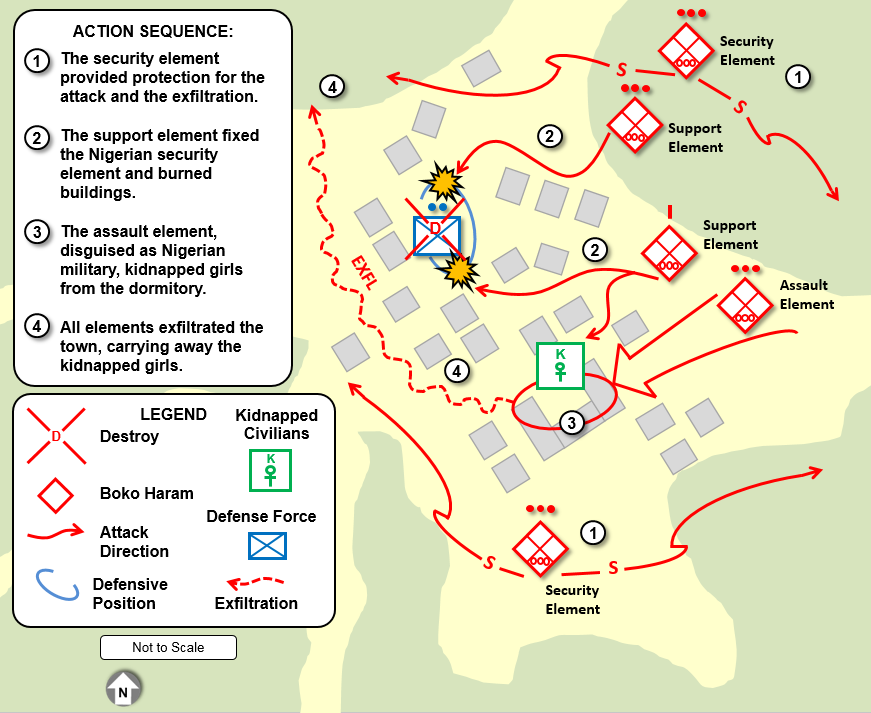
Map showing the events of the raid, produced by the United States Armed Forces

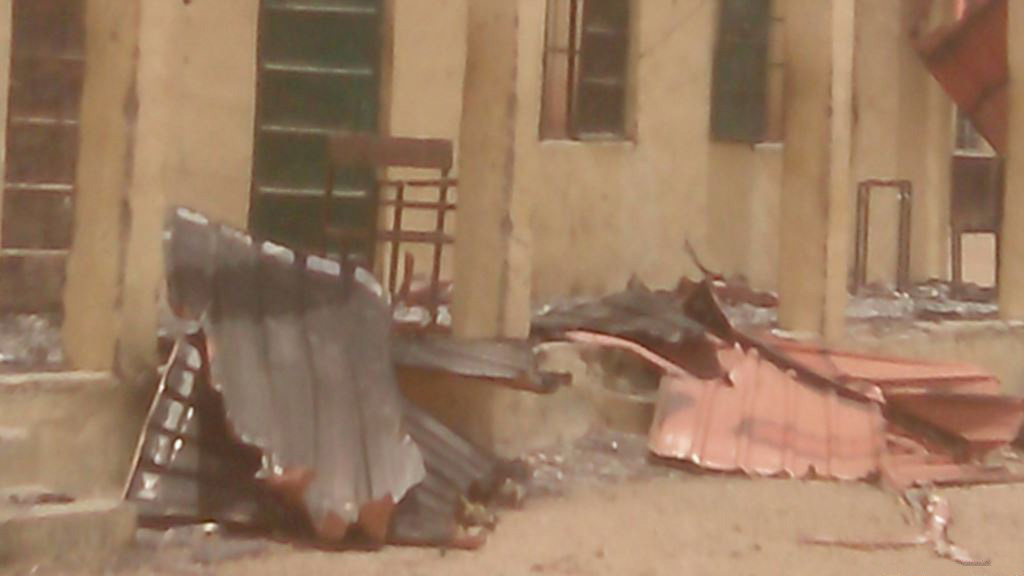
Damage to the school seen in the aftermath of the attack

On the night of 14 April 2014, members of the Islamic jihadist terrorist group Boko Haram attacked the Government Girls Secondary School in Chibok, Nigeria, a majority Christian village. A few hours prior to the raid, residents in Chibok had received phone calls from neighbouring villages warning them of the incoming attack, who had witnessed convoys containing armed insurgents driving in the direction of the town. The kidnappers broke into the school, pretending to be soldiers of the Nigerian Armed Forces and dressed in matching military uniforms. The militants also engaged approximately 15 soldiers based in Chibok, who were unable to stop the attack as the militants had superior numbers and firepower, and no reinforcements were sent by the Nigerian Military during the course of the attack. A soldier and a police officer were killed during the course of the raid. The attack lasted for about 5 hours, during which houses in Chibok were also burned down.

According to accounts given by some of the girls, including a diary written by two of the girls (Naomi Adamu and Sarah Samuel) whilst in captivity, the militants had intended to steal a piece of machinery and were initially unsure what to do with the girls. They told the girls to get out and come with them. Some girls were loaded into vehicles and the rest had to walk several miles until other trucks came to take them away, possibly into the Konduga area of the Sambisa Forest, a former nature reserve covering 60,000 km^{2} where Boko Haram were known to have fortified camps. An unidentified senior military source believed that the girls may have been split up and placed in different Boko Haram camps, around Lake Chad, the Gorsi mountains and the Sambisa forest. 57 girls were able to escape by jumping from the trucks in which they were being transported.

In the immediate aftermath of the attack, local vigilantes and parents searched the Sambisa forest in an attempt to locate and rescue some of the kidnapped girls, but were unsuccessful in finding the captives.

The school had been closed for four weeks before the attack due to deteriorating security conditions, however students from multiple schools and villages were in attendance at the time of the raid to take final exams in physics. There were 530 students registered to participate in Senior Secondary Certificate Examination at the Government Girls Secondary School, although it is unclear how many were in attendance at the time of the attack. The children were aged from 16 to 18 years of age and were in their final year of school. There was initial confusion over the number of girls kidnapped, with the Nigerian military initially incorrectly claiming in a statement that the majority of the girls had escaped or been released and only eight were still unaccounted for. Parents said that 234 girls were missing, however according to the local police approximately 276 children were taken in the attack, of whom 53 had escaped by 2 May. It is widely accepted that initially 276 girls were kidnapped. Other reports gave various other figures for the number of kidnapped and missing students.

Amnesty International condemned the Nigerian government, stating that it believed that the Nigerian military had a four hour advance warning of the kidnapping but failed to send reinforcements to protect the school. The Nigerian military later confirmed that they had a four-hour advance notice of the attack but stated that their over-extended forces were unable to mobilize reinforcements.

== Aftermath ==
=== Events in 2014 ===
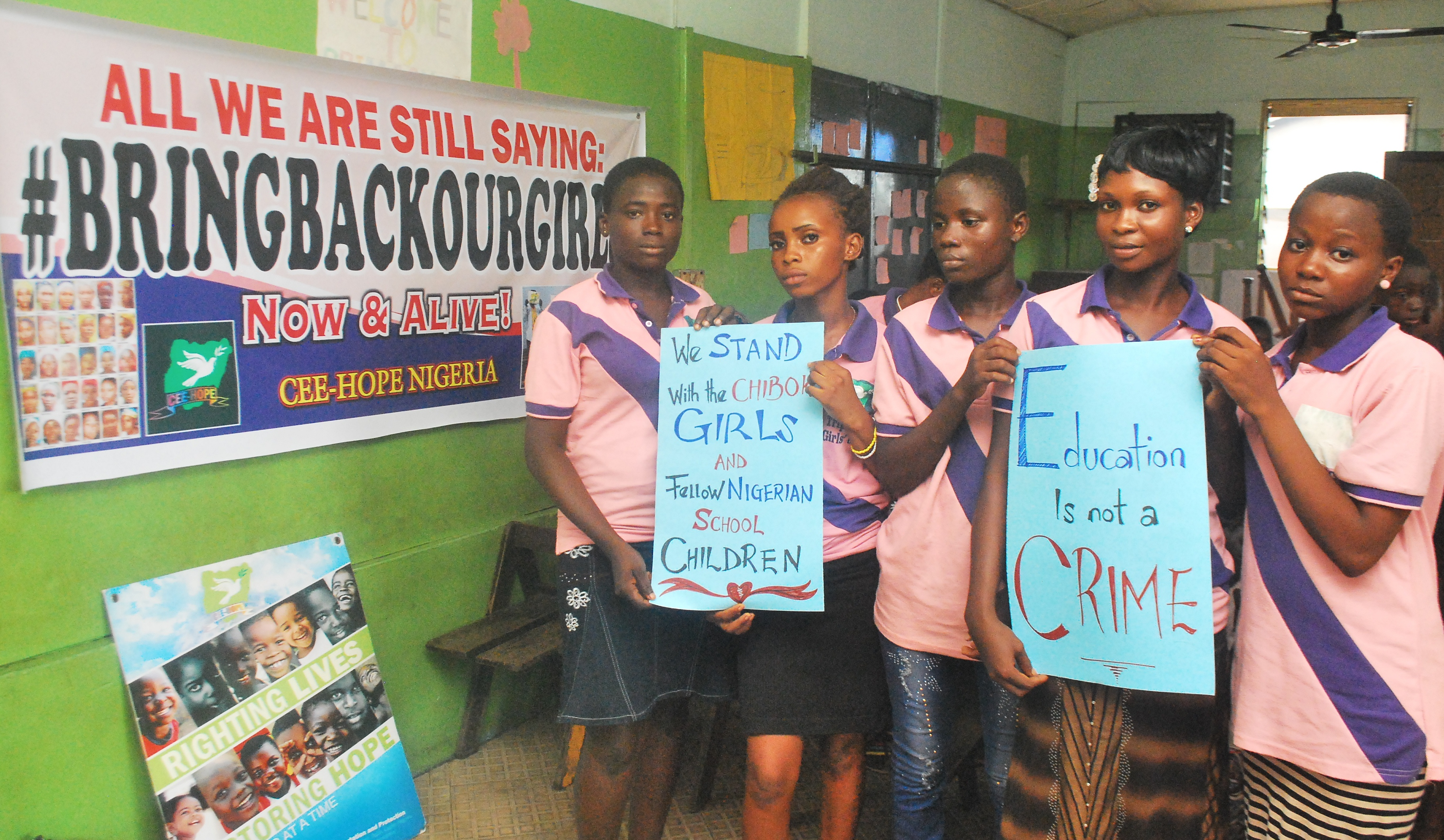
CEE-HOPE Nigerian organized an event to commemorate the one year anniversary of the kidnappings

The overwhelming majority of the kidnapped girls who were Christian were forced to convert to Islam. The girls were forced into marriage with members of Boko Haram, with a reputed bride price of ₦2,000 each ($6/£4). Sightings of the students were reported by villagers living in the Sambisa Forest, considered a refuge for Boko Haram. Others reported seeing the students crossing into the neighbouring countries of Chad and Cameroon with the militants, though Kashim Shettima, the governor of Borno State in Nigeria, said on 11 May that he had sighted the abducted girls and claimed that they had not been taken across the borders into either country. The Nigerian Military enlisted help from local volunteers and vigilantes in order to search forests close to Nigeria's borders by 21 April. Local residents were able to track the movements of the students with the help of contacts across north eastern Nigeria. A diary written by some of the kidnapped students described how some were able to escape, but were returned to Boko Haram by local villagers and whipped as punishment.

On 2 May, the Nigerian police said that the exact number of students kidnapped was unclear and asked parents to forward the names and photos of kidnapped girls so an official count could be made. The police blamed damage to school records during the attack as a reason for the confusion. Nigerian president Goodluck Jonathan spoke publicly about the kidnapping for the first time on 4 May, saying the government was doing everything it could to find the missing girls. At the same time, he criticized parents for not supplying enough information about their missing children, claiming that they were not fully cooperating with the police.

The Guardian reported that the British Royal Air Force conducted Operation Turus in response to the kidnapping. A source involved with the operation told the Observer that "the girls were located in the first few weeks of the RAF mission", and that "we [the RAF] offered to rescue them, but the Nigerian government declined", because they viewed the matter as a "national issue" to be resolved by Nigerian intelligence and security services. Sir Andrew Pocock, British High Commissioner to Nigeria at the time of the kidnapping, said that a couple of months after the kidnapping, a group of up to 80 of the Chibok girls were seen by American "eye in the sky" technology but nothing was done. About 80 girls, a camp and evidence of vehicle movement were spotted next to a local landmark called the "Tree of Life" in the Sambisa forest.

Boko Haram leader Abubakar Shekau claimed responsibility for the kidnappings in a video released shortly after 1pm on 5 May. Shekau claimed that "Allah instructed me to sell them... I will carry out his instructions", and that "Slavery is allowed in my religion, and I shall capture people and make them slaves." He said the girls should not have been in school and instead should have been married since girls as young as nine are suitable for marriage. Another video was released a week later, which showed about 130 girls dressed in hijabs and long Islamic chadors. This was the first public sighting of the girls since they were abducted from Chibok. In this video, Shekau acknowledged that many of the girls were not Muslims, but that some had converted to Islam and that they would "treat them well the way the Prophet Muhammad treated the infidels he seized". Shekau also mentioned that he would not release the girls until captured Boko Haram militants in prison were released, raising the possibility of a prisoner exchange with the Nigerian government.

Following the Chibok kidnapping, several attacks linked to Boko Haram occurred in Nigeria. On 5 May, at least 300 residents of the nearby town of Gamboru Ngala were killed in an attack by Boko Haram militants after Nigerian security forces left the town to search for the kidnapped students. The next day, Boko Haram militants abducted 8 girls aged between 12 and 15 from northeastern Nigeria. In the night of 13 to 14 May, Boko Haram ambushed a military convoy that was searching for the abductees near Chibok, killing twelve soldiers and wounding several others. The incident led to mutiny of government forces at Maiduguri, reducing the ability of the Nigerian Army to rescue the schoolgirls. Between 20 and 23 June 91 women and children were abducted in other areas of Borno State by Boko Haram militants, with an estimated 600 girls held by Boko Haram in three camps outside Nigeria by this stage. Boko Haram once again attacked Chibok and other nearby villages on 22 July, killing at least 51 people, including 11 parents of the abducted girls.

A journalist-brokered deal to secure the release of the girls in exchange for 100 Boko Haram prisoners held in Nigerian jails was scrapped at a late stage on 24 May after President Goodluck Jonathan consulted with U.S., Israeli, French and British foreign ministers in Paris, where the consensus was that no deals should be struck with terrorists, and that a solution involving force was required. On 26 May, the Nigerian Chief of Defence Staff announced that the Nigerian security forces had located the kidnapped girls, but ruled out a forceful rescue attempt for fears of collateral damage. Two of the kidnapped girls were found raped, "half-dead", and tied to a tree on 30 May by a civilian militia in the Baale region of Northeastern Nigeria. Villagers said that Boko Haram had left the two girls and had killed four other disobedient girls and buried them. Another 4 girls escaped later in the year, walking for three weeks and reaching safety by 12 October. They said they had been held in a camp in Cameroon and raped every day.

It was reported on 26 June that the Nigerian government had signed a contract worth more than $1.2 million with Levick, a Washington, D.C. public relations firm to work on "the international and local media narrative" surrounding the Chibok schoolgirl kidnapping. The contract was labeled a waste of money by President Jonathan's critics. Jonathan was criticized for a lack of communication regarding the kidnapping. Via an opinion column in The Washington Post, Jonathan attributed his silence to a desire not to compromise the details of security efforts being carried out to rescue the girls.

On 1 July, a businessman suspected of carrying out the kidnappings of the school girls, as well as the bombing of a busy market in northeastern Nigeria, was arrested. Military sources said that he was also accused of helping the Islamist militant group kill the traditional leader Idrissa Timta, the Emir of Gwoza. Two weeks later, Zakaria Mohammed, a high-ranking member of Boko Haram, was arrested at Darazo-Basrika Road while fleeing from counterinsurgency operations around the Balmo Forest.

=== Events in 2015 ===
Stephen Davis, a former Anglican clergyman, contacted three Boko Haram commanders who said they might be prepared to release Chibok schoolgirls and went to Nigeria in April 2015. He was given proof of life (a video of them being raped) and was told 18 were seriously ill, some with HIV. Davis got initial agreement that Boko Haram would release these ill girls. However, after three attempts the deal fell through when another group abducted the girls believing they could make money out of them and Davis left Nigeria. Davis commented that it was not difficult to locate the five or six main Boko Haram camps, and that he was able to find them on Google Earth.

Renovation of the school commenced in March, with Nigerian finance minister Ngozi Okonjo-Iweala visiting Chibok to deliver a short speech and help with laying bricks at the school.

By May, the Nigerian military had reclaimed most of the areas previously controlled by Boko Haram in Nigeria including many of the camps in the Sambisa forest where it was suspected the Chibok girls had been kept. Although many women previously held captive by Boko Haram had been freed as the Nigerian military reclaimed these areas, none of the Chibok girls were found. President Muhammadu Buhari, who gained power through the 2015 Nigerian general election, stated in December that he was willing to negotiate with Boko Haram for the release of the Chibok girls without any preconditions.

Acting director of defence information, Col. Rabe Abubakar, stated that the Nigerian armed forces would "not rush" to rescue the remaining girls. He justified this by claiming that rescue operations required "diligent intervention and a high-level operation".

=== Events in 2016 ===
The Nigerian military freed 1,000 women and girls held captive in the village of Boboshe by Boko Haram in January, but none of them were Chibok girls.

Boko Haram released another video in April showing 15 girls who appeared to be Chibok girls, at which point at least 219 of those originally kidnapped were still missing. The video was reportedly taken in December 2015, and the girls seemed to show no signs of distress, though it is possible that the militants selected the girls on the video specifically to give the impression all the Chibok girls were in good health.

Chibok schoolgirl Amina Ali Nkeki was found on 17 May by the vigilante Civilian Joint Task Force group in the Sambisa Forest, along with her baby and Mohammad Hayyatu, a suspected Boko Haram militant who claimed to be her husband. All three were suffering from severe malnutrition when they were found. She was then taken to house of the group's leader Aboku Gaji who recognised her. The group then reunited the girl with her parents. She met Nigerian President Muhammadu Buhari on 19 May. Government officials announced the same day that the Nigerian army and vigilante groups had killed 35 Boko Haram militants, freed 97 women and children and claimed one of the women was a Chibok schoolgirl. However, there were doubts that this girl, Serah Luka, was really one of the kidnapped Chibok schoolgirls. On 21 May 2016, Amir Muhammad Abdullahi, who claimed to be the Boko Haram second in command and speaker for several senior militants, offered to surrender so long as they would not be harmed, and in return they would release hostages, including the Chibok girls. However, when talking about the Chibok girls, he said that "...frankly, just about a third of them remain, as the rest have been martyred".

In August, the Nigerian military announced they had launched an air attack on Boko Haram's headquarters in the Sambisa Forest, claiming to have killed several commanders and seriously wounded the leader Abubakar Shekau. Later reports suggested the attack also killed 10 of the Chibok girls and wounded 30 others. Later in the month, Boko Haram released a video of what appeared to be about 50 Chibok girls, some holding babies, with an armed masked spokesman who demanded the release of jailed fighters in exchange for the girls' freedom. The masked gunman said some of the Chibok girls had been killed by Nigerian air strikes and 40 had been married. The film was apparently released on the orders of Abubakar Shekau, the leader of one of the factions of Boko Haram.

Following negotiations between Boko Haram and the Nigerian government, 21 of the Chibok schoolgirls were released in October. The negotiations were brokered by International Committee of the Red Cross and the Swiss government. A child born to one of the girls and believed by medical personnel to be about 20 months old also was released. On 16 October, President Buhari's spokesperson stated that the ISIL-allied faction of Boko Haram was willing to negotiate the release of 83 more of the girls. According to him, the splinter group had stated that the rest of the girls were under the control of Shekau-led faction. Two days later, Pogu Bitrus, the chairman of the Chibok Development Association, claimed that more than 100 of the missing girls apparently did not want to return home because they had either been brainwashed or were fearful of the stigma they would receive. Another girl named Maryam Ali Maiyanga was found along with a baby and rescued by the Nigerian Army on 5 November. The spokesman for the army, Sani Usman, said that she was found in Pulka, Borno State whilst screening escapees from Boko Haram's Sambisa forest base. She was confirmed to be one of those kidnapped at Chibok by Bring Back Our Girls.

=== Events in 2017 ===
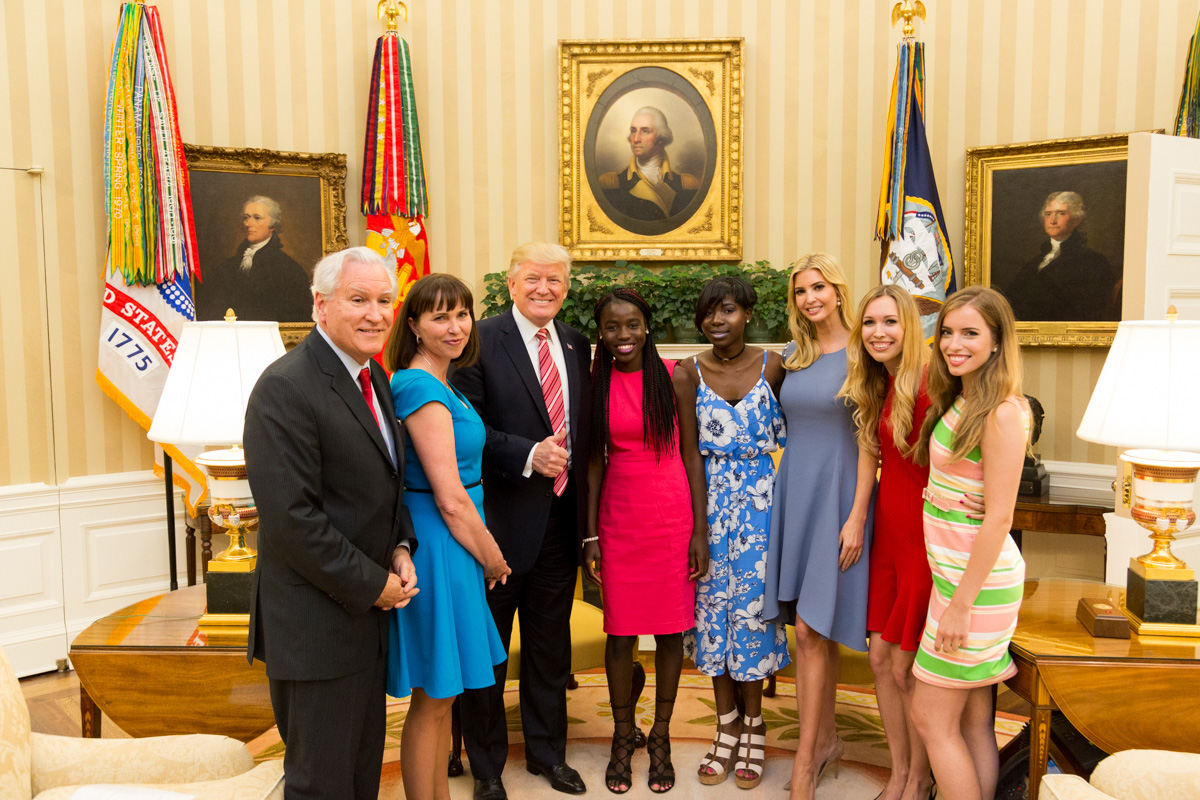
U.S. President Donald Trump, Ivanka Trump, and Chibok schoolgirls Joy Bishara and Lydia Pogu at the White House on 27 June 2017.

One of the kidnapped girls, Rakiya Abubakar, was reported on 5 January to have been found by the Nigerian Army along with a 6-month-old baby while they were interrogating suspects detained in army raids on the Sambisa forest. Her identity was later confirmed by Bring Back Our Girls group.

82 further schoolgirls were released on 6 May following successful negotiations between the Nigerian government and Boko Haram, involving the exchange of five Boko Haram leaders. The negotiations were carried out by Mustapha Zanna, barrister and owner of an orphanage in Maiduguri. The deal also involved the intervention of the human security division of Swiss government's foreign ministry and the Red Cross. 3 million euros (about 3.7 million USD) were paid as ransom money in two duffel bags for the total of 103 girls released in October 2016 and May 2017. A Nigerian government spokesman stated that though 83 girls were originally to be released in May 2017, one of them chose to stay with her husband instead of being freed.

U.S. President Donald Trump met Chibok schoolgirls Joy Bishara and Lydia Pogu at the White House on 27 June, who were due to start education at Southeastern University in Florida. Bishara and Pogu delivered a letter to Trump, urging him to "keep America safe and strong".

=== Events in 2018 ===
In January 2018, the Nigerian military stated that it had rescued Salomi Pogu, another of the kidnapped girls. Col. Onyema Nwachukwu stated that she was rescued near Pulka, Borno. She was found in the company of another young woman and her child. In February, most of the released girls were studying at the American University of Nigeria not far from the original scene of the kidnapping at Chibok. It was estimated that 13 girls were presumed dead and 112 were still missing.

In September, Ali Garga, a Boko Haram militant, offered to free 40 of the remaining Chibok schoolgirls. After discovering his actions, he was subsequently tortured and killed by other Boko Haram members. In July, Nigerian police arrested and charged eight Boko Haram fighters allegedly involved in the kidnapping, with one defendant convicted and sentenced to 20 years in prison.

=== Events in 2021 ===
An unknown number of girls escaped in January 2021. In 2021 Parkinson and Hinshaw published a book (Bring Back Our Girls: The Astonishing Survival and Rescue of Nigeria's Missing Schoolgirls) which drew on interviews with the girls, former militants, spies and government officials. Much of the book was based on a diary kept by 24-year-old Naomi Adamu, one of the girls who had been kidnapped and freed in 2017. Adamu described her experiences, including how they had compulsory lessons on the Quran every day and were regularly beaten with rifle butts, rope and wire. The girls who refused to be married were not abused sexually; however, they were treated as slaves and forced to provide hard manual labor. She led a group of resistant girls who refused to convert to Islam, who were threatened with being killed and starvation by the militants.

=== Events in 2022 ===
In June 2022, Nigerian troops found a Chibok girl called Mary Ngoshe and her baby near a village called Ngoshe in Borno State. Three more were later rescued in July 2022. A woman named Aisha Grema was rescued with her child in August 2022. Three were rescued in September 2022 from different locations, while Yana Pogu was rescued along with four children later in the same month from Bama and Rejoice Sanki was rescued from Kawuri in October 2022.

=== Events in 2023 ===
Two Chibok schoolgirls were rescued in April 2023 along with a baby; both had been married three times since being kidnapped. Another named Saratu Dauda was rescued the next month. A woman named Rebecca Kabu was rescued from Cameroon in July 2023, whilst a girl named Mary Nkeki was rescued from Dikwa in Borno in August 2023.

=== Events in 2024 ===
In April 2024, members of the Chibok community gathered to attend the screening of the film Statues Also Breathe and to remember the women still missing. That month, one of the abducted girls named Lydia Simon was rescued by the Nigerian military. In June, another girl named Ehi Abdul was rescued by the Nigerian military.

=== Events in 2025 ===
The federal government of Nigeria announced a grant of ₦1.85 billion to educate and rehabilitate the rescued girls in September 2025. Former Minister of Foreign Affairs Bolaji Akinyemi stated in November 2025 that the US had planned to assist the Nigerian military in rescuing the Chibok schoolgirls, but pulled out after discovering that Boko Haram had been alerted by someone in the Nigerian military.

== Reactions ==
A public art installation created by Nigerian artist Sarah Peace in Epping Forest, depicting the missing girls with black veiled figures

After the kidnapping, Borno State Governor Kashim Shettima demanded to visit Chibok, despite being advised that it was too dangerous. United Nations Secretary-General Ban Ki-moon and UNICEF condemned the abduction, as did former Nigerian military ruler Muhammadu Buhari. The UN Security Council also condemned the attack and warned of action against Boko Haram militants for abducting the girls.

The president of the Muslim Students Society of Nigeria called on Muslims to fast and pray "in order to seek Allah's intervention in this precarious time". Sa'ad Abubakar III, the Sultan of Sokoto, also called for prayers and intensified efforts to rescue the students. On 9 May, Shettima called on all Muslims and Christians to join in "three days of prayers and fasting". On the same day, Muslims in Cameroon called on fellow believers not to marry any of the girls should they be offered to them. On the same day, the Grand Mufti of Saudi Arabia, Sheikh Abdulaziz Al al-Sheikh, joined other religious leaders in the Muslim world in condemning the kidnappings, describing Boko Haram as misguided and intent on smearing the name of Islam. He stated that Islam is against kidnapping, and that marrying kidnapped girls is not permitted.

On the 600th day of the Chibok girls' abduction, a group of Nigeria experts in the United Kingdom known as the Nigeria Diaspora Security Forum called on the government of President Muhammadu Buhari to set up a special taskforce tasked solely with the responsibility of looking for the girls.

=== International reactions ===
==== Governments ====
- Canada: Canadian prime minister Stephen Harper acknowledged that Canadians had joined the international effort to free the schoolgirls. Details about the extent and duration of the involvement have been kept secret.
- China announced its intention to make available "any useful information acquired by its satellites and intelligence services".
- France offered a specialist team. French President François Hollande also offered to hold a summit in Paris with Nigeria and its neighbours to tackle the issue.
- Israel: Israeli prime minister Benjamin Netanyahu offered assistance to the Nigerian President in locating the missing pupils on 11 May 2014. "Israel expresses its deep shock at the crime committed against the girls. We are willing to help assist in locating the girls and fighting the terror that is afflicting you", he said. According to an unnamed Israeli official, the Prime Minister later sent a team of intelligence experts to Nigeria. It contained people experienced in dealing with hostage situations, but he said they "are not operational troops, they're there to advise". A joint U.S.-Israel project, which modified the Beechcraft C-12 Huron aircraft for electronic warfare and reconnaissance, was being used and "may prove decisive in finding the girls", according to one source.
- United Kingdom agreed to send experts to Nigeria to assist in the search for the students. The British experts were to be drawn from various governmental departments including the Foreign Office, the Department for International Development and the Ministry of Defence, and would concentrate on planning, co-ordination and advice to local authorities. A Sentinel R1 reconnaissance aircraft of the Royal Air Force was deployed to Ghana to assist in the search.
- United States agreed to send experts to Nigeria to assist in the search for the students. The American team consists of military and law enforcement officers, specializing in "intelligence, investigations, hostage negotiation, information-sharing and victim assistance". The US is not considering sending armed forces. Former Nigerian Vice President, Atiku Abubakar, and Dr. Babangida Aliyu, chairman of the Northern Governor's Forum, "welcomed the US government's offer of military assistance". On 12 May 16 military personnel from US African Command joined the Search and Rescue Operations. On 22 May, the Department of Defense announced that it was deploying an Unmanned Aerial Vehicle and 80 United States Air Force personnel to nearby Chad. Chad was chosen as a base for intelligence, surveillance, and reconnaissance flights because of its access to northern Nigeria.

==== Organisations ====
- European Union passed a resolution on 17 July, "calling for immediate and unconditional release of the abducted schoolgirls".

=== Criticism of media coverage ===
Adaobi Tricia Nwaubani writing for BBC News said that the kidnappings had "nothing to do with" the way media described the event as "an attack on girls' education", but was instead "banditry gone wrong". She described the media response as "Determined to make the Boko Haram attacks about the irresistible theme of terrorists targeting female education, some media outlets ignored any thread that did not fit this narrative". Victims of the kidnappings described the intention of the perpetrators as "simply on a mission to loot and steal". The perpetrators did not know what do to with the students after they had emptied a food store room, and began arguing. According to Nwaubani, little attention was paid by media to this detail.

There were previous school attacks by Boko Haram which had little media attention. One such example is an attack a few weeks prior to Chibok where female students were let to flee but 40 male students were killed in the dormitory.

Boko Haram eventually became the first terror group in history to use more female suicide bombers than male suicide bombers. Hilary Matfess, a co-author of the 2017 report by the Combating Terrorism Center which reported this number, said that "Through the global response to the Chibok abductions, the insurgents learned the potent symbolic value of young female bodies... that using them as bombers would attract attention".

== #BringBackOurGirls movement and protests ==
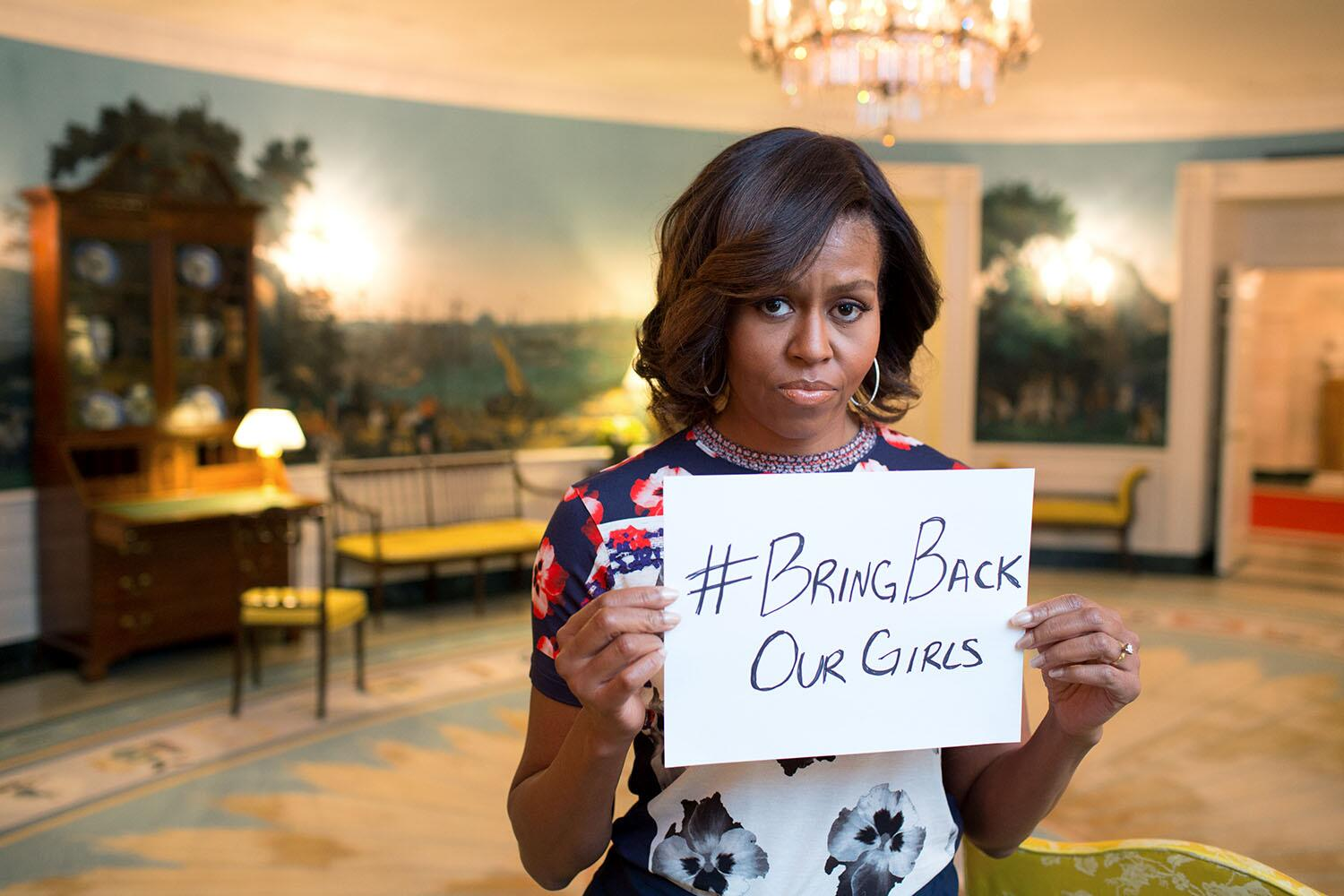
A photograph of Michelle Obama holding a sign with the #BringBackOurGirls hashtag, posted to her official Twitter account to help spread the awareness of the kidnapping.

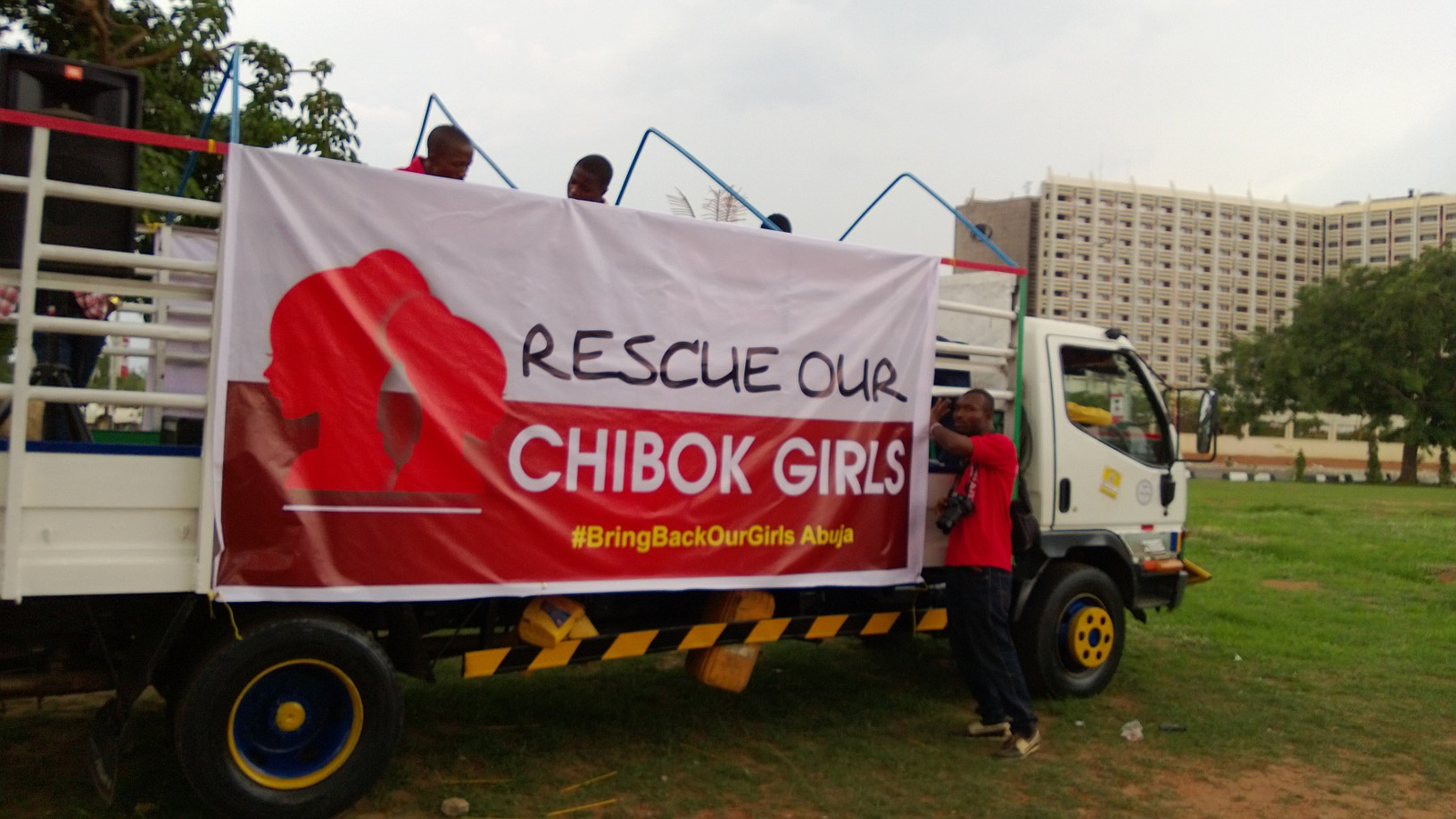
A truck in Nigeria promotes the #BringBackOurGirls hashtag.

Parents and others took to social media to complain about the government's perceived slow and inadequate response. The news caused international outrage against Boko Haram and the Nigerian government. On 30 April and 1 May, protests demanding greater government action were held in several Nigerian cities. However, most parents were afraid of speaking publicly for fear their daughters would be targeted for reprisal. On 3 and 4 May, protests were held in major Western cities including Los Angeles and London.

Initially, usage of the hashtag came from individuals attempting to raise awareness of the kidnapping. Ibrahim M Abdullahi, a lawyer in Abuja, the capital of Nigeria, started the hashtag #BringBackOurGirls in a tweet posted in April 2014 after listening to the former Federal Minister of Education Oby Ezekwesili speak on the kidnappings at an event at Port Harcourt. It was then used by a group of Nigerian activists protesting about the government's slow response to the kidnapping to tag tweets as they marched down a highway in protest. The hashtag began to trend globally on Twitter by May 2014 as a form of hashtag activism and the story spread rapidly internationally, becoming for a time Twitter's most tweeted hashtag. By 11 May it had attracted 2.3 million tweets and by 2016 it had been retweeted 6.1 million times. An official Twitter account for the movement was then set up, with a group of 20–30 people involved in its organization. Oby Ezekwesili and Aisha Yesufu have both been described as co-founders or co-conveners of the movement. A $300,000 cash reward was initially offered by the movement to anyone who could help locate or rescue the girls from their kidnappers.

The movement has been involved in the organization of several protests against the Nigerian government's slow response to the kidnapping. Naomi Mutah and Saratu Angus Ndirpaya, two women who were involved in the leadership and organization of the protests, were detained by the Nigerian police reportedly because the First Lady of Nigeria, Patience Jonathan, "felt slighted" when they were sent to attend a meeting instead of some of the mothers of the kidnapped girls. Ndirpaya was released soon after, and stated that the First Lady had accused them of fabricating the abductions, whilst others at the meeting had accused the two of being members of Boko Haram. Several online petitions were created to pressure the Nigerian government to act against the kidnapping. On 30 April, hundreds of protestors marched on the National Assembly to demand government and military action against the kidnappers. Vigils and protests were held around the world to mark 100 days since the kidnapping. Participating countries included Nigeria, Pakistan, India, Bangladesh, Togo, the United Kingdom, the United States, Canada and Portugal. Daily rallies by Bring Back Our Girls demonstrators at the Unity Fountain in Abuja were continuing to at least 5 January 2015, despite efforts by the police to shut down such protests. To mark a year since Boko Haram kidnapped the girls, on 13 April 2015 hundreds of protesters wearing red tape across their lips walked silently through the capital Abuja. Security forces are known to have detained protestors and dispersed crowds with armed police and water cannon.

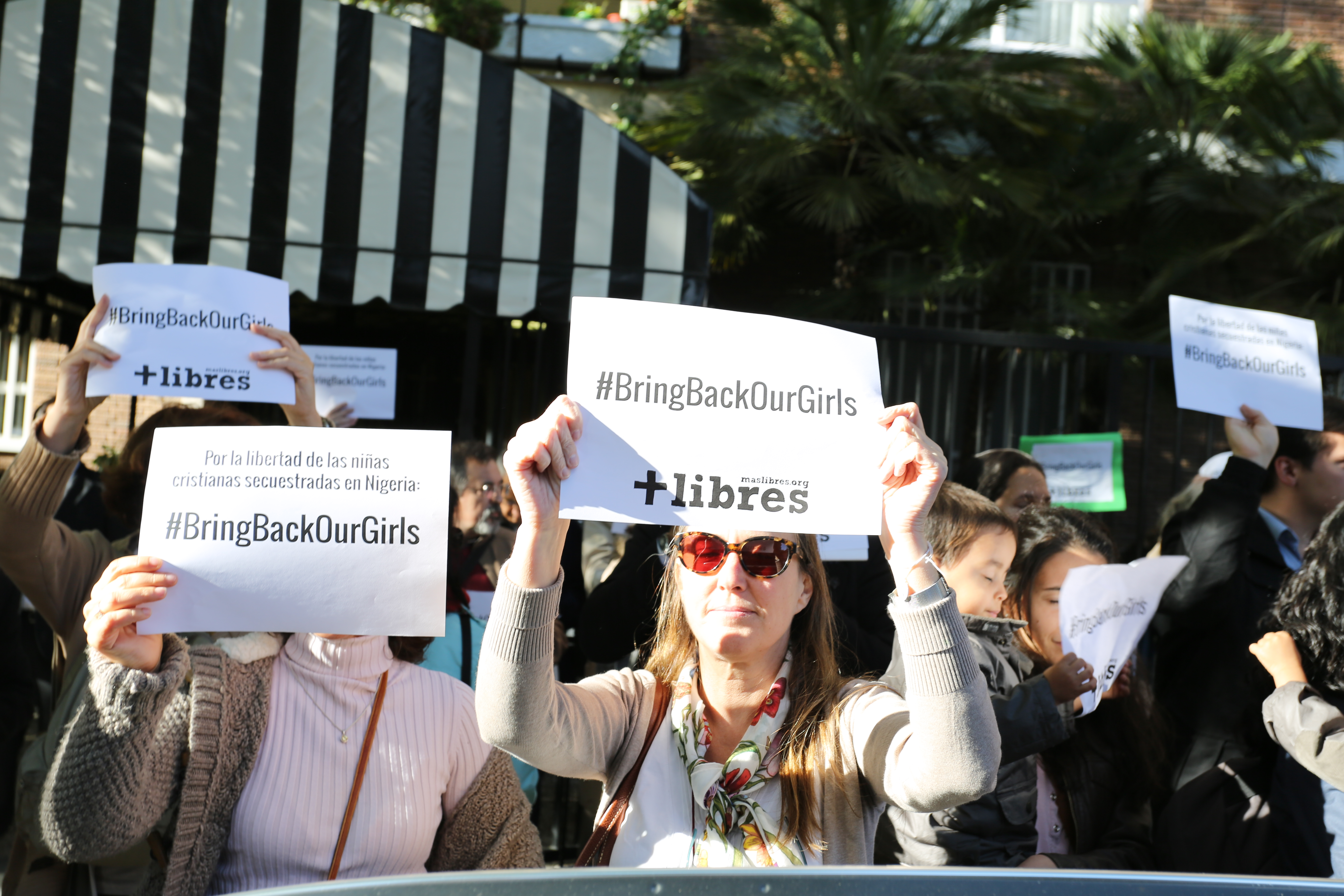
The social media movement resulted in offline protests around the world, including this one in Spain.

The movement attracted support from several celebrities. Notable participants included Malala Yousafzai, Hillary Clinton, Chris Brown Forest Whitaker, and First Lady Michelle Obama, who was photographed holding up a sheet of paper with the hashtag to support the movement and gave a public address on the kidnappings a few days later. Beyoncé had a separate section on her website that was dedicated to the movement.

The movement was criticized by some American conservatives, including Fox News contributor George Will, who stated that it was "not intended to have any effect on the real world" and House Intelligence Committee Chairman Mike Rogers who stated that the White House could not base its policy "on what's trending on Twitter". However, the hashtag has reportedly had an impact on Nigerian politics, with Oby Ezekwesili, a notable #BringBackOurGirls activist, running for presidency in the 2015 Nigerian general election. President Goodluck was criticized for using the hashtag "#bringbackgoodluck2015", a play on #BringBackOurGirls, during his reelection campaign in 2015. The newly-elected Nigerian President Muhammadu Buhari, who gained power over Goodluck following the 2015 elections after promising to tackle Boko Haram, said during his inaugural address to the nation on 29 May 2015 that they could not claim to "have defeated Boko Haram without rescuing the Chibok girls". Two weeks after President Buhari was sworn in, he, his wife Aisha Muhammadu Buhari, and the Vice President's wife Mrs. Dolapo Osinbajo met with some mothers of the abducted girls.

Abubakar Shekau mocked the efforts of the movement in a video released by Boko Haram. The movement has also been attributed to a change in Boko Haram tactics, and was linked to an increase in gender violence in the group in order to increase their recognition. A report released by Human Rights Watch in October 2014 on Boko Haram's violence against women and girls in Nigeria claims that, "The relative ease with which Boko Haram carried out the Chibok abductions seems to have emboldened it to step up abductions elsewhere." It has been reported that the international publicity for the Chibok schoolgirls has ironically made it more difficult to free the girls, with a military commander based in Maiduguri stating that Boko Haram viewed the Chibok girls as their "trump card".

== Later abductions ==
Between 2014 and 2024, more than 1400 schoolchildren were taken from Nigerian schools.

=== 2015 ===
In January 2015, less than a year after the 2014 Chibok abduction, in the village of Malari, Borno State about 40 boys and young men were abducted by Boko Haram.

=== 2018 ===
In February 2018, approximately four years after the 2014 Chibok abduction, in the nearby town of Dapchi again another 110 schoolgirls were abducted by Boko Haram, with no government intervention intercepting the abductors yet as of 4 March 2018.

A UNICEF report released in April 2018, claimed that more than 1,000 children have been kidnapped by Boko Haram since 2013.

=== 2020 ===
In December 2020, more than 500 boys were abducted by a group of masked gunmen from a secondary school in Kankara, a town in Nigeria's northwestern state of Katsina. Later, Boko Haram took responsibility for the abductions. Seven days after the incident, 344 boys out of the group were released due to successful negotiations by the Nigerian government.

=== 2021 ===
In February 2021, three mass kidnappings occurred at schools in Nigeria. In the first incident, gunmen kidnapped over 40 people, including at least 27 students, from a school in north-central Nigeria. In the second incident, on 25 February, gunmen abducted 317 girls from the Girls Science Secondary School in Jangebe, Zamfara State. In March 2021, another mass kidnapping in Afaka resulted in 39 students (made up of 23 females and 16 males) being abducted from Federal College of Forestry Mechanisation, Afaka, in the Igabi local government area of Kaduna State.

=== 2024 ===
On March 7, one staff member and 287 students were kidnapped from a school in Kuriga in northwestern Kaduna; 137 children were released two weeks later, but the staff member had died during that time.

=== 2025 ===
On 21 November 2025, 303 students and 12 teachers were taken from St Mary's School in Papiri, Niger State.

=== 2026 ===
On 15 May, armed men attacked three schools located in Oriire Local Government Area of Oyo State, Nigeria, and abducted over 30 pupils, teachers, and a toddler. After 56 days, the victims' rescue was officially confirmed by the sitting President, Bola Ahmed Tinubu.

== In media ==
- Irish writer Edna O'Brien's award-winning novel, Girl, published in 2019, offers an imaginative idea of what the experience of being kidnapped, even ultimately leading to escape, might have been like through the eyes of a single schoolgirl.
- Prune Nourry, in collaboration with 108 students of Obafemi Awolowo University and the family of the abducted girls, produced 108 clay-head sculptures of the missing girls.
- Atwal, Gemma (2018). Stolen Daughters: Kidnapped by Boko Haram (Motion picture).
- Adaobi Tricia Nwaubani (2018). Buried Beneath the Baobab Tree. (Novel, HarperCollins)
- Nourry, Prune (2022). Statues Also Breathe (Video). Nigeria: Department of Fine and Applied Arts at Obafemi-Awolowo University.
- Nagarajan, Chitra. The World Was in Our Hands: Voices from the Boko Haram Conflict. Cassava Republic Press, 2025. ISBN 978-1913175566

== See also ==
- Daughters of Chibok
- Raptio - large scale abduction of women
- Aboke abductions
- 2025 Niger State school kidnapping

== Bibliography ==
- Parkinson, Joe; Hinshaw, Drew (2021). Bring Back Our Girls: The Astonishing Survival and Rescue of Nigeria's Missing Schoolgirls. Swift Press. ISBN 978-1-80075-027-2.
- TRADOC G-2 (2015). Threat Tactics Report: Boko Haram (PDF). Fort Eustis: United States Army Training and Doctrine Command.
- Aisha Ahmad. 2019. ""We Have Captured Your Women": Explaining Jihadist Norm Change." International Security 44(1):80–116.
- Hilary Matfess. 2017. Women and the War on Boko Haram. Zed Books.
