= June 2014 Gwoza massacres =

Terrorist incident in Nigeria

Coordinates: 11.0933°N 13.8206°E

Gwoza massacre
- Part of the Boko Haram insurgency
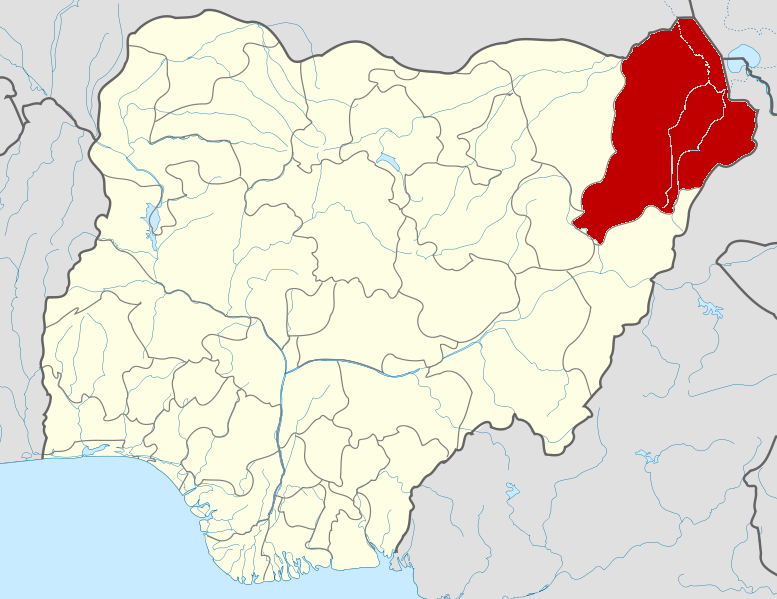
- Location: Gwoza, Borno State, Nigeria
- Date: 2 June 2014
- Deaths: ~ 110 - 500

The Gwoza massacre was a terrorist event that occurred on 2 June, 2014 in the Gwoza local government district, Borno State near the Nigerian-Camerounian border.

Militants (presumably from Boko Haram) dressed as soldiers slaughtered hundreds of civilians in the villages of Goshe, Attagara, Agapalwa and Aganjara. Some sources have put the death toll at 400-500.

A community leader who witnessed the Monday killings had said that local residents had pleaded for help from the military, but it did not arrive in time. It took a few days for word from survivors to reach the provincial capital of Maiduguri, because the roads are extremely dangerous and phone connections are poor or nonexistent, due to the state of emergency declared in Borno about a year before. The slaughter was confirmed by both Mohammed Ali Ndume, a senator representing Borno and whose hometown is Gwoza, as well as a top security official in Maiduguri who insisted on anonymity.

Several eyewitness sources reported that men and boys were targeted in these attacks. According to one witness, "When some of the villagers managed to escape, they were unfortunately waylaid outside the villages by some gunmen on motorcycles who would catch and slaughter the men and young boys; they only allowed women and children to go." Another source reported that mothers had their male infants taken from them and shot.

This followed shortly after the assassination of Muslim leader Alhaji Idrissa Timta, the Emir of Gwoza, at the end of May.

In 2022, a HumAngle piece found that many survivors of the massacre still were unable to return to their homes in Gwoza LGA. While the displaced remained in various refugee camps, people who did return to the LGA faced fears of renewed attacks due to their proximity to the Sambisa Forest—a known terrorist hideout.

== See also ==
- Fall of Gwoza
