= Amina Ali =

Nigerian hostage

- Born: Amina Ali Nkeki; Nigeria
- Known for: Abducted during the Chibok schoolgirls kidnapping

Amina Ali Nkeki is a Nigerian former hostage of Boko Haram. She was one of 276 female students the group kidnapped from Chibok in 2014. After 57 of the girls escaped in the first few months, the remaining 219 were held for several years. Of this larger group, Ali was the first freed. She was found on 17 May 2016 by Civilian Joint Task Force along with a four-month-old child and an alleged Boko Haram member, Mohammed Hayatu, who described himself as her husband. All three were severely malnourished.

== Aftermath of kidnapping ==
Ali was taken to the house of the leader of the Civilian Joint Task Force in Chibok, Aboku Gaji. After he recognised her, the group then reunited her with her parents. Ali also stated that 6 of the kidnapped Chibok schoolgirls had died.

She met Nigerian President Muhammadu Buhari on 19 May. In June 2016, the Bring Back Our Girls group as well as Ali's parents started demanding to know her whereabouts as they had not seen her since her meeting with Buhari. It was later discovered that she and her baby were being held in a government facility where they were to be deradicalised. In her interview with Reuters in August 2016, she stated that she was not comfortable with the way she was being kept from her husband Hayatu and that she still thought about him. She also stated that she just wanted to go home. While 21 Chibok schoolgirls who were formerly held by Boko Haram were allowed to visit their families in 2016 for Christmas, Ali and another girl, Maryam Ali Maiyanga were not, due to being reportedly deemed psychologically unfit to return home.

In 2017, Ali was studying at the American University of Nigeria, with the aim of becoming an accountant.

== See also ==
- List of kidnappings
- List of solved missing person cases (post-2000)
