= Cineni =

Village in Gwoza, Borno State, Nigeria

Cineni is a village in Gwoza, Borno State, Nigeria. It is the home of the Cineni language.
