= Izghe attack =

Massacre of 106 Nigerian civilians

Coordinates: 10.9833°N 13.3000°E

The Izghe attack was a terrorist incident that occurred in the evening of February 15, 2014.

Gunmen suspected of being members of Boko Haram entered the village of Izghe, Borno State in the early hours of the morning and murdered 105 men and 1 elderly woman.

A few days later, a repeat massacre occurred in the same village.

This was part of a wave of attacks by Boko Haram in February 2014; the Konduga massacre took place on the same date.

A group of people went to a Christian farming village of Izghe in Borno state and killed up 106 people. "Male residents of the village were the main target of shootings Saturday evening." The suspected gunmen were members of Boko Haram. "Killing over 100 people, the Boko haram are suspected in the attack of a small farming village, Izghe, in Borno, Nigeria."

One of the people that were involved in the attack had to jump fences to save his life. "A survivor of the attack scaled the fence of his house and crawled for about 40 minutes to safety."

The location at which the attack occurred was Izghe village, a village in Nigeria. "They moved door to door in search of male residents who were hiding."

The attack happened in order to cause the nation to go into war. "In the choosing of churches as targets for bombings, many see an attempt to drive a wedge between Christians and Muslims and perhaps push Nigeria into a civil war fueled on both sides by religious extremism."

It happened in that the attackers went into the village and killed several civilians.
