= Buni Yadi =

Buni Yadi Yadin Buni, Buni Gari
- Town
- Interactive map of Buni Yadi
- Location within Nigeria
- Coordinates: 11°16′13″N 12°0′22″E
- Country: Nigeria
- State: Yobe State
- LGA: Gujba
- Time zone: UTC+1 (WAT)

Buni Yadi, Buni Gari, Yadin Buni (or simply Buni) is a town in Gujba Local Government Area, Yobe State, Nigeria, about 55 km from Damaturu, the capital of Yobe State.

== Insurgency ==
Buni yadi has been attacked a number of times by the Boko Haram terrorists which lead to the closure of the public places like markets.

== See also ==
- Battle of Buni Yadi
