= Guduf-Gava language =

Afro-Asiatic language of Nigeria

Guduf-Gava
- Native to: Nigeria
- Region: Borno State
- Native speakers: (56,000 cited 2000)
- Language family: Afro-Asiatic: Chadic; Biu–Mandara; Wandala–Mafa; Wandala (A.4); West; Guduf-Gava
- Dialects: Cineni

Language codes
- ISO 639-3: gdf
- Glottolog: gudu1252

Guduf-Gava (also known as Gudupe, Afkabiye) is an Afro-Asiatic language spoken in Borno State, Nigeria. In a 2006 paper, Roger Blench classified Cineni as a dialect.

Blench (2019) lists Cikide as a dialect of Guduf.
