= Gwoza =

- City and LGA
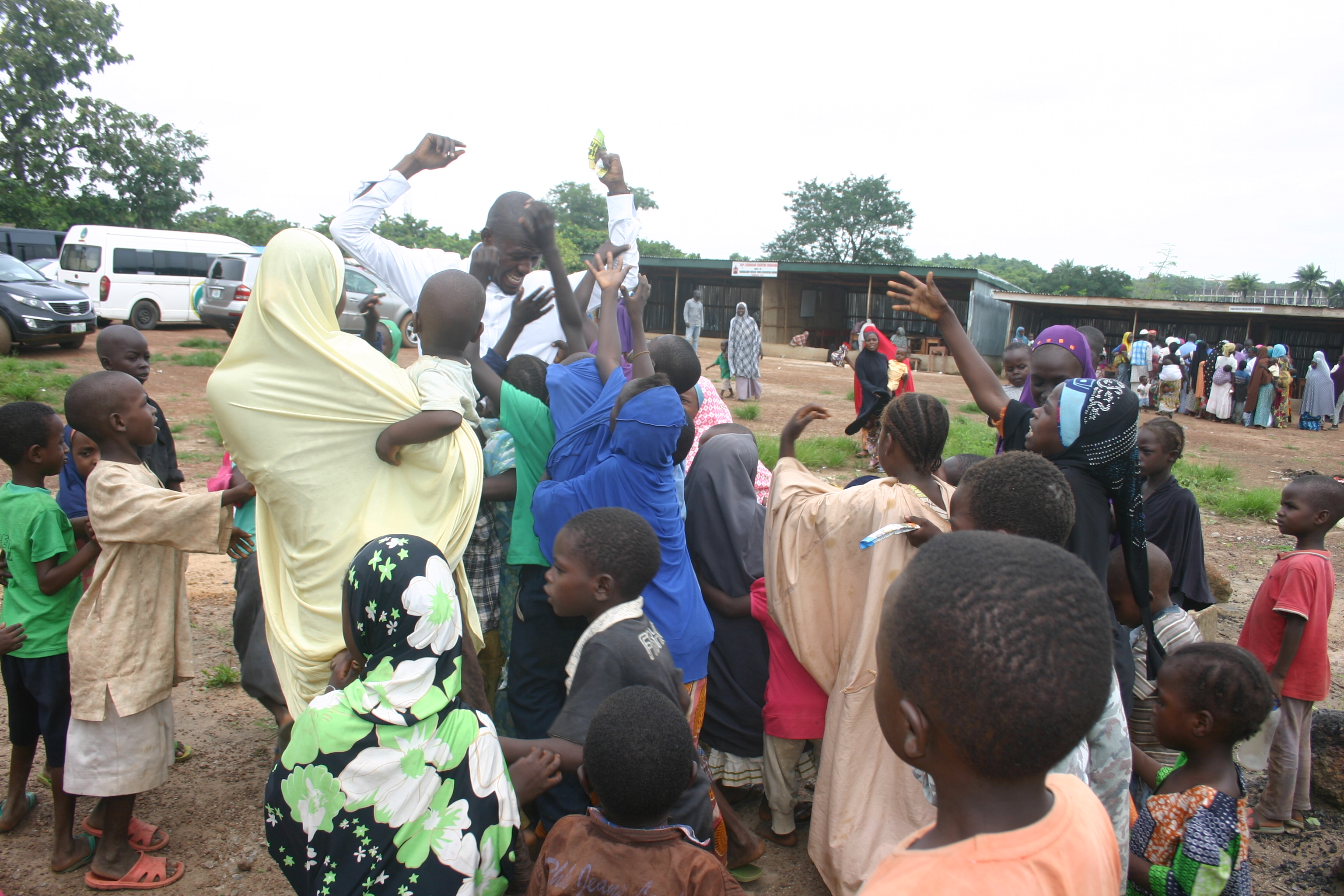
- An IDP Camp in Gwoza
- Interactive map of Gwoza
- Location within Nigeria
- Coordinates: 11°5′10″N 13°41′29″E
- Country: Nigeria
- State: Borno State

Area
  - Total: 2,883 km^{2} (1,113 sq mi)

Population (2016)
  - Total: 388 600
  - Density: 134.8/km^{2} (349/sq mi)
- Time zone: UTC+1 (WAT)
- Postal code: 610

Gwoza is a city and local government area of Borno State, Nigeria. It is a border town "about 135 kilometres South-East of Maiduguri." The postal code of the area is 610.

The terrain is rocky and hilly. The Gwoza Hills, with heights of about 1300m above sea level provides scenery and is made up of the Mandara Mountains, which form a natural barrier between Nigeria and Cameroon, starting from Pulka. They overlook the game reserves by meandering towards Mubi and beyond in Adamawa State.

The Gwoza LGA has been called "a notorious hide out for the Boko Haram insurgents," who arrived in the area in 2009 from Maiduguri. The area has suffered considerable violence as a result of the Islamist insurgency in Nigeria, and in 2014, saw an influx of Boko Haram fighters fleeing Sambisa Forest.

As of 23 June 2014, "reports indicated that the whole of Gwoza was under attack. The report could not be substantiated because most telephone masts in Gwoza and surrounding villages have been vandalized by insurgents." Deutsche Welle reported that "Roads out of the region are extremely dangerous and phone connections are poor to nonexistent."

As of 19 October 2014, an estimated 3,000 Gwoza residents displaced by fighting are "squatting on the fringes of Abuja", according to a local relief committee spokesman, with "the need for shelter, food, clothing and medicare for the displaced also becoming dire."

On 27 March 2015, the day before the Nigerian presidential election, the Nigerian Army announced that it had recaptured the town of Gwoza from Boko Haram.

== History ==
In April 2014, residents in Gwoza LGA reported that Boko Haram members fleeing from Sambisa Forest had moved into their towns on motorcycles, "being spotted in Patawe, Fadagwe, Wala, Uvaha, Gatha, Jige, Warabe and Ngoshe" villages. Motorcycles had been banned throughout Borno State for almost two years, and were rarely used by non-Boko Haram members.

According to House of Representatives member, Hon. Peter Biye Gumtha, since the beginning of the Boko Haram attacks, "over 200 churches have been completely razed down, leaving only 8 functional churches in the whole of Gwoza Council area." As of January 2014, Biye was "the only Christian House of Representatives member from Borno State." He remarked:

“What is happening in my constituency is very unfortunate and frightening. People are being killed by terrorists on a daily basis, Churches are being burnt, and if people like me who is also a member of the House Committee on Army, alerted military authorities based on intelligence reports that my village would be under attack by terrorists, and nothing was done to secure the area, then it is unfortunate, because the ordinary people that live in volatile areas are no longer safe and protected by our security outfits.

On 30 May 2014, the traditional ruler, the Emir of Gwoza, Idrissa Timta, was killed after he was abducted with his colleague, the Emir of Uba, Ismaila Mamza, by armed men, in Hawul LGA. "His convoy was ambushed while he was on the way to attend the funeral of his deceased colleague, the Emir of Gombe, Alhaji Shehu Abubakar."

Governor Kashim Shettima of Borno State traveled to Gwoza, accompanied by a sizeable military escort, to pay his last respects to the Emir of Gwoza. As of June 2014, the Maiduguri-Bama road to Gwoza has been designated a "no-go zone" due to an "upredictable security situation". A journalist accompanying the Emir counted "16 towns, villages and hamlets that were completely deserted along the 135km road." In his eulogy, Governor Shettima described the late Shehu Idrissa Timta as “a man who spent better part of his reign preaching peace and tolerance.”

On 12 June 2014, Idrissa Timta's son, Muhammad Timta, (also called Alhaji Muhammad Shehu) became the new Emir of Gwoza. He "promised to unite and strengthen the relationship between Christians and Muslims in the area."

On 2 June 2014, in an event that has been called the Gwoza massacre, "No fewer than 300 villagers were reportedly killed in three communities around Gwoza local government area of Borno State" by gunmen suspected to be members of Boko Haram. "The militants arrived in Toyota Hilux pickup trucks - a common vehicle for the military - and told civilians they were soldiers there to protect the local population ... The gunmen reportedly gathered people in the center of the villages and fired on them. As people attempted to flee, militants on motorcycles waited outside the villages and attacked them."

On 8 June 2014, the spokesperson for a group of religious and political leaders in Gwoza LGA, Dr Asabe Vilita, (also Borno Commissioner for Commerce and Investment), said:

“[W]e wish to state categorically clear that there is no outbreak of religious war in our communities in Gwoza as being speculated, especially in the social media. What our people are facing is full-scale insurgents’ attack and terrorism. Although sometimes people have disagreements due to the confusion caused by the attacks in different areas, our people have since identified the insurgents as common enemy and have decided to unite in fighting them.”

She said 1,290 people had been displaced, and that "most people had to escape to Maiduguri", where three camps have been set up. According to Vilita, "four of the six communities in Gwoza East are currently under siege by the insurgents": Ngoshe, Agapalwa, Ashigashiya and Cikide. On 22 June 2014,

The insurgents were said to have taken over most outskirts of Gwoza including the towns of Pulka and Kirawa, forcing residents to flee into neighboring Cameroon villages of Mura and Marwa, some 75km away from Nigeria borders.

On 24 August 2014, Boko Haram claimed that it had formed an Islamic caliphate in Gwoza town. In December 2014, one hundred eighty five people in the Gumburi village area were kidnapped by Boko Haram. It was also reported that "people too elderly to flee Gwoza Local Government Area were being rounded up and taken to two schools where the militants opened fire on them." Over 50 elderly people were killed. A "gory video" was released of insurgents shooting over a hundred civilians in a school dormitory in the town of Bama.

In March 2015, the Nigerian army was reported to have retaken Gwoza town from Boko Haram forces.

On 29 June 2024, at least 32 people were killed in attacks believed to have been carried out by female suicide bombers in Gwoza.

== Towns ==
- Gwoza, the headquarters of Gwoza LGA
- Kirawa
- Pulka
- Ashigashiya
- Ngoshe
- Limankara

== Villages ==
- Agapalawa
- Amuda
- Arbako
- Ashigashiya
- Attagara
- Barderi
- Barawa
- Cineni
- Cikide (Chikide)
- Gava
- Guduf
- Hirdembeh
- Izghe
- Joghode
- Limankara.
- Koghum
- Kerawa (Kirawa)
- Kundeh
- Kwatara
- Pelekwa
- Nggoshe
- Ngoshe
- Pulka
- Sabon Gari
- Vale

Cineni language, Wandala, Dghwede language, Glavda language, Guduf-Gava language, Gvoko language, Lamang language, Mafa Language, and Waja language are spoken in Gwoza LGA.

== Climate ==
In Gwoza, the wet season is hot, oppressive, and mostly cloudy and the dry season is sweltering and partly cloudy. Over the course of the year, the temperature typically varies from 58 °F to 104 °F and is rarely below 52 °F or above 108 °F.

== See also ==
- Gwoza massacre
- Izghe attack
