= Cineni language =

Afro-Asiatic language spoken in Nigeria

Cineni
- Native to: Nigeria
- Region: Borno State
- Native speakers: (3,000 cited 1998)
- Language family: Afro-Asiatic: Chadic; Biu–Mandara; Wandala–Mafa; Wandala (A.4); West; Guduf-Gava; Cineni

Language codes
- ISO 639-3: cie
- Glottolog: cine1238

Cineni is an Afro-Asiatic language spoken in Borno State, Nigeria in the single village of Cineni. In a 2006 paper, Roger Blench classified it as a dialect of Guduf-Gava.
