= Jonathan N. C. Hill =

Jonathan N.C. Hill is a British academic in the Defence Studies Department at King's College London based at the UK's Joint Services Command and Staff College.

Hill specializes in postcolonialism and in the Maghreb.

== Books ==
Hill is the author of:

- Identity in Algerian Politics: The Legacy of Colonial Rule (2009)
- Nigeria since Independence: Forever Fragile (2012)
- Democratisation in the Maghreb (2016)
