= 2001 Jos riots =

2001 religious violence in Nigeria

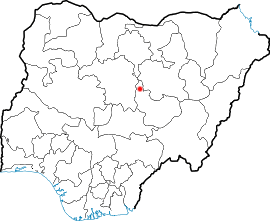
Location of Jos in Nigeria

The 2001 Jos riots were riots involving Christians and Muslims in Jos, Nigeria, over the appointment of a Muslim politician, Alhaji Muktar Mohammed, as local coordinator of the federal poverty alleviation program. The clashes started on 7 September and lasted nearly two weeks, ending on 17 September. Some 1,000 people were killed during the riots.

== Causes ==
Religious and ethnic conflicts have repeatedly occurred in Jos due to the city's geographical placement in Nigeria. Jos, the capital of Plateau State, is located in the middle of the country, which lies between the predominantly Muslim north and the predominantly Christian south. Jos was also known for its job opportunities, leading people from around Nigeria to move there for employment. The influx of people led to tensions between members of "indigene" (indigenous) ethnic groups and non-indigene ethnic groups (often referred to as "settlers").

In June 2001, the federal government appointed a Hausa Muslim politician, Alhaji Muktar Mohammed, as local coordinator of the federal poverty alleviation program. Indigene Christians protested his appointment. Tensions turned violent on 7 September 2001, when a Christian woman attempted to cross a barricaded street outside a mosque during Friday prayers. This led to a conflict between her and a group of Muslims. The fight eventually spread to other parts of the city.

== Riots ==
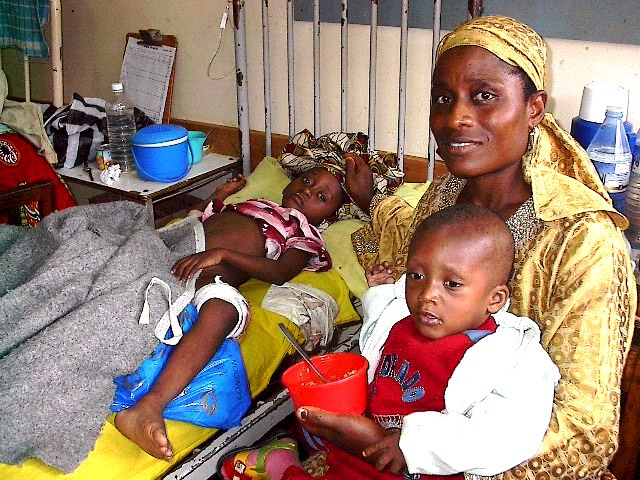
A hospitalized gunshot victim (left) from the 2001 Jos riots

Fighting spread through various Jos neighborhoods and to surrounding communities. Property and even human beings were set on fire. Many houses, shops, mosques, and churches were burned or damaged. Torched cars were left along the streets after the clashes. Christian leaders reported that Muslims spontaneously attacked Christians and burned churches, including three churches of the Church of Christ in Nigeria (presently known as Church of Christ in Nations, COCIN), the main Assemblies of God church, and a Jos Apostolic Church. The military was eventually deployed and stopped the violence. Local sources said the military's intervention and enforcement of the curfew helped end the clashes.

== Aftermath ==
The 10 days of violence left approximately 1,000 dead. Because of the large number of people killed in the clashes, a mass burial had to be arranged. The riots caused the displacement of at least 50,000 civilians. The authorities arrested several hundred people and set up a commission of inquiry, which identified people who were allegedly involved in the violence, but no one was successfully prosecuted.

== See also ==
- 2008 Jos riots
- 2010 Jos riots
