= 2014 Jos bombings =

Terrorist incident in Nigeria

- Part of the Boko Haram insurgency
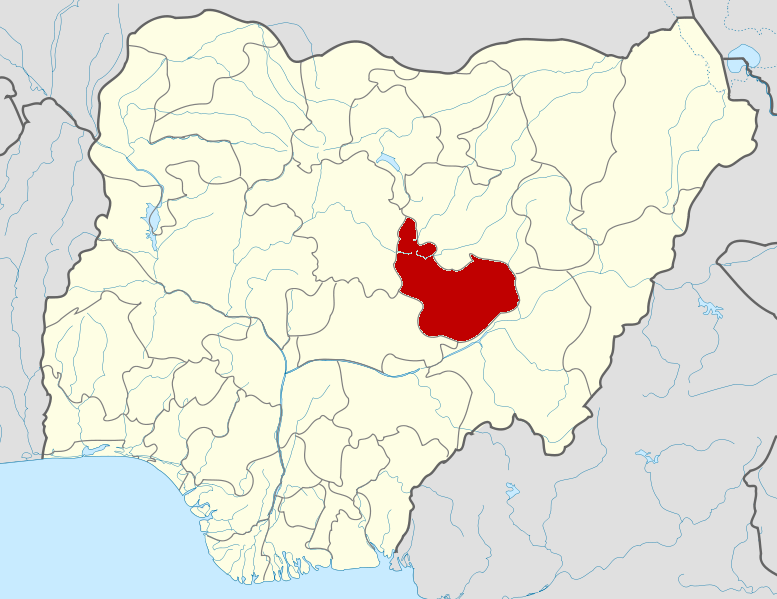
- Location: 9°52′N 8°53′E; Jos, Plateau State, Nigeria
- Date: 20 May 2014
- Target: Bus station and market
- Weapon: Car bombs
- Deaths: 118+
- Injuries: 56+
- Perpetrator: Boko Haram Suspected

On 20 May 2014, two bombs exploded in Jos, Plateau State, Nigeria, killing at least 118 people and injuring more than 56 others. The first bombing occurred in a marketplace, and the second near a bus station. Though no group or individual has claimed responsibility, the attacks have been attributed to Boko Haram.

== Background ==
Christians and Muslims had several confrontations in Jos in years preceding the bombings, and militant group Boko Haram was also active prior to the attack. In 2012, multiple churches were bombed by Boko Haram in order to try to start a religious conflict between Christians and Muslims. In the month prior to the attack, Boko Haram abducted over 200 schoolgirls, though Jos had two significant attacks since 2012. One day after the bombings 27 were killed in village attacks.

== Attack ==
The twin car blasts were 30 minutes apart, one at 3:00 and the other at 3:30. The first explosion occurred in the Terminus Market, where there were over fifty casualties. In Terminus there was a "teaching hospital, shops, offices and a market" prior to the attack. The second explosion took place near a hospital. The second explosion killed potential rescuers who had gone to assist after the first bomb exploded. A large amount of black smoke was also visible. The bombings were likely designed to inflict the maximum number of casualties. The car bomb caused nearby vehicles to alight.

=== Aftermath ===
Firefighters and rescue workers tried to reach the sites of the bombings, but "thousands" of people were fleeing from the area. The bombs had been positioned to kill as many as possible, indiscriminate of religion using a "back-to-back blast" tactic, whereby a bomb explodes and another that explodes a short time later is designed to kill rescue workers as well as initial casualties. Youths and soldiers created checkpoints in the area, with some carrying out searches of vehicles. The body count is expected to rise, and some bodies were burned beyond recognition. A death count of 46 was rapidly raised to the current figure of 118 as the rubble was cleared. However, some have put the figure as high as 150.

== Reactions ==
=== Domestic ===
- Nigeria – President Goodluck Jonathan condemned the bombings, and called them a "tragic assault on human freedom", and the bombers "cruel and evil".

=== International ===
- Turkey – The Ministry of Foreign Affairs of Turkey stated that, "We have learned with deep sorrow these bombings. Turkey strongly condemn these attacks targeting the friendly people of Nigeria, convey our condolences to the Nigerian State and its people and wish a speedy recovery to the injured.
- United Kingdom – UK Foreign Secretary William Hague called the attack in Jos a "cowardly, inhumane crime".
- United States – A US state department spokeswoman said the bombing, and other recent attacks blamed on Boko Haram, were "unconscionable, terrorist acts".
