= 2010 Jos riots =

Ethno-religious conflict in central Nigeria

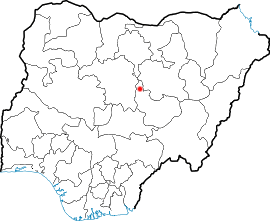
- Location of Jos in Nigeria
- Location: 9°55′12″N 8°53′33″E; Jos, Plateau, Nigeria
- Date: 17 January 2010
- Attack type: religious rioting
- Deaths: 2,992

Clashes took place in 2010 between Muslim and Christian ethnic groups in central Nigeria in and near the city of Jos. The first spate of violence of 2010 started on 17 January in Jos and spread to surrounding communities. Houses, churches, mosques and vehicles were set ablaze, during at least four days of fighting. At least 326 people, and possibly more than a thousand, were killed.

Hundreds of people died in fresh clashes in March 2010. Many people were killed and dumped into wells.

This is the third major incident of rioting in Jos within a ten-year span. Some one thousand people were killed in riots in 2001, and at least 700 died in subsequent violence in 2008.

Jos is the capital of Plateau State, in the middle of the divide between the predominantly Muslim north of Nigeria and the predominantly Christian south. Since 2001, the area has been plagued by violence motivated by multiple factors. The clashes have been characterised as "religious violence" by many news sources, although others cite ethnic and economic differences as the root of the violence.

== Overview ==
=== January ===
Reports on the catalyst vary. According to the state police commissioner, skirmishes began after Muslim youths set a Catholic church, filled with worshippers, on fire. A local paper reported that attackers yelled "Allahu Akhbar" before burning down churches and homes. Other community leaders say it began with an argument over the rebuilding of a Muslim home in a predominantly Christian neighbourhood that had been destroyed in the November 2008 riots. Both Muslim and Christian youth have been blamed for starting the violence. A 24-hour curfew was imposed on the city on 17 January 2010.

On 19 January, the violence spread to smaller towns and villages south of Jos. Armed mobs, mostly Christians from the Berom ethnic group, attacked Muslims, including Hausa-Fulani residents, killing or driving them out and burning their homes, mosques, and property. The worst massacre took place on 19 January in the settlement of Kuru Karama, where 174 people, including 36 women and 56 children, were killed. Satellite images released by Human Rights Watch show the near complete destruction of buildings in Kuru Karama.

The BBC reported the fighting had spread to Pankshin, 100 km from Jos. These reports have been denied by the Army. On 20 January, Vice-president Goodluck Jonathan ordered troops to Plateau State to restore order. Vice-president Jonathan held executive authority at the time, as President Umaru Yar'Adua was in Saudi Arabia receiving medical treatment.

The state police command said 326 people died in the January violence. Community leaders put the figure at 1,025 dead. More than 5,000 people were displaced.

=== March ===
Before dawn on 7 March 2010, Muslim Hausa-Fulani herders massacred more than one hundred Christians in Dogo-Nahawa village near Jos. Residents in the village were mainly Berom Christians. The attacks went on for four hours, and nearby villages were also targeted. The attackers fired guns to cause panic and as people fled chopped them with machetes. They set alight many of the buildings and left corpses dumped in the streets. Many of the dead were women and children, including an infant less than three months of age.

The state police command reported that 109 people died in the attack, including at least 38 children. A state official told journalists that more than 500 people were killed, while a plaque at a mass grave in Dogo-Nahawa states that 501 died in the massacre, and lists the names of 354 victims. Other community leaders put the death toll at 164, including 34 women and 98 children.

== Causes ==
The clashes have often been characterised as "religious violence." The Plateau State Christian Elders Consultative Forum, for example, referred to the March 2010 attack in Dogo-Nahawa as "yet another jihad and provocation" while Muslims community regards the clash as an effort to eradicate Muslim inhabitant in a mission for religious profiling. Many others, however, cite ethnic differences and social and economic issues as the root of the violence. The Anglican Archbishop of Jos, Benjamin A. Kwashi, for example, noted that, "What seems to be a recurring decimal is that over time, those who have in the past used violence to settle political issues, economic issues, social matters, intertribal disagreements, or any issue for that matter, now continue to use that same path of violence and cover it up with religion." Professor Kabiru Mato of the University of Abuja also played down the role of religion in the riots: "I don't see anything religious. Wherein religion could be the difference between the two warring factions, fundamentally it's a manifestation of economic alienation. So social apathy, political frustration, economic deprivation and so many factors are responsible." But this view has been challenged by the fact that places of worship, such as churches and mosques, have always been targeted during these riots. So religion has been used as a galvanising force in the crisis no matter what the initial cause of conflict.

An ethnic rivalry between the Hausa and Berom peoples is also cited as a factor in the violence. The Catholic archbishop in Abuja, Nigeria's capital, referred to the violence as "a classic conflict between pastoralists and farmers, except that all the Fulani are Muslims and all the Berom are Christians." However, this assertion is challenged by the fact that most ethnic groups in Plateau State, which are predominantly Christian, share the same sentiments with the Berom and collectively see an Islamic threat in their own lands.

"The Beroms have been accused of resenting the economic progress of other settler groups: yet, this is another simplistic assertion. Most Plateau natives collectively feel they do not have the Federal connections or patronage other major ethnic groups have. And most Nigerian wealth has been driven by oil money. The Beroms and other Plateau natives are predominantly farmers and have had to experience their lands taken away and degraded by tin mining. Now, they have to contend with migrant groups who use Federal influence and wealth to displace them from their own lands. The massive structure of the Federal Government is fuelled primarily by oil money. The Beroms, as well as other Plateau natives, feel they should have a measure of autonomy in their core lands just the way Native Americans in their homesteads are treated as a Sovereign nation, elevated to the status of a protected minority. Nigeria's constitution has no place for respecting the rights of minorities, whether it is Jos, or the Niger Delta."

Discrimination against the mainly Muslim "settlers" of Jos is also cited as an issue. While the mainly Christian indigenous population are classified as "indigenes," the mainly Muslim immigrants to Jos, many of them Hausa-Fulani, are classified as "settlers," even if they have been living in the city for decades, and find it difficult to secure government jobs or educational scholarships, among other things. This has further accentuated divisions in and around the city.

== Response ==
The Vatican expressed outrage and sadness at the riots. Pope Benedict XVI said the attacks were "atrocious" and "violence does not resolve conflicts but only increases the tragic consequences."

Vice President Jonathan, who was the acting president at the time, urged that the killers be caught. The police announced that 313 people were arrested in relation to the January 2010 violence, while 200 people were arrested following the March 2010 violence. As of 2013, federal prosecutors had secured convictions of at least 129 people involved in the 2010 violence.

The Socio-Economic Rights and Accountability Project wrote to the International Criminal Court, asking them to investigate the riots for potential crimes against humanity. The ICC prosecutor replied in November 2010 stating that the situation was being analysed by the prosecutor to see if a case should be opened.

== See also ==
- 2001 Jos riots
- 2008 Jos riots
- History of Nigeria
- Religious violence
- 2011 Alexandria bombing
