= Idrissa Timta =

Nigerian traditional leader (1942–2014)

Shehu Mustapha Idrissa Timta (1942 – May 30, 2014) was a Nigerian leader who served as the third emir of Gwoza from October 1981 until his death in May 2014. He was killed in an attack by Boko Haram terrorists on May 30, 2014.

Timta was born in 1942, the son of the second emir of Gwoza, Idrisa Timta. He attended Muslim Elementary School until 1948 and Senior Primary School in Bama, Nigeria, from 1952 to 1960. He attended Provincial Secondary School (present-day Government College Maiduguri) from 1960 until 1964. He taught for a short time and then enrolled at Ahmadu Bello University in Zaria, where he studied sharia law. Timta began his career as an inspector of area courts for the former North-Eastern State judicial system. He was promoted to Principal Inspector of Area Courts, a position he held until he became emir in 1981.

He was appointed the third emir of Gwoza, a local government area in present-day Borno State, in October 1981. He was elevated to second class emir status in 1987. In January 2014, Governor of Borno State Kashim Shettima further elevated Timta to first class traditional ruler status.

On April 13, 2014, Timta condemned the Boko Haram terrorist organization, which is active in the Gwoza area and the rest of Borno State. He decried the group's insurgency, violence and the negative socio-economic impact that it had inflicted on Gwoza. In a speech, Timta said, "our people have witnessed increased attacks with mass killings by the insurgents in the last four months. The attacks have crippled both social and economic lives in the entire area...It is sad to say that my people have been blocked from going to the market by the insurgents, who kill at will." Timta appealed to the Nigerian government to prevent further Boko Haram attacks.

On May 30, 2014, Timta and two other leaders were traveling to Gombe, Nigeria, for the funeral of the Emir of Gombe Shehu Abubakar. Timta's convoy was attacked by Boko Haram terrorists in an ambush near Biu, Nigeria. Timta was killed in the attack, along with his driver and two policemen, who shielded the other emirs. The two other emirs who were driving to the funeral with Timta - the emir of Askira Abdullahi Ibn Muhammadu Askirama and the emir of Uba Ali Ibn Ismaila Mamza II - barely escaped the attack.

Timta was survived by his centenarian mother, four wives, and twenty-eight children.

The Gwoza Emirate Council in Borno State appointed his successor, Muhammad Timta, as the fourth emir of Gwoza in June 2014, two weeks after the attack. He was presented with a letter of appointment from the Borno State government on June 13, 2014.
