= 2008 Jos riots =

Religious riots in Nigeria

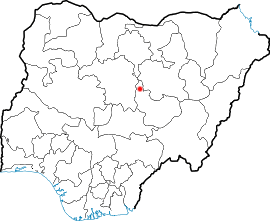
Location of Jos in Nigeria

The 2008 Jos riots were riots involving Christians and Muslims over the result of a local election on 28 and 29 November 2008 in Jos, a city in the North central region of Nigeria. Two days of rioting left hundreds injured and at least 761 dead. The Nigerian army was deployed and by 30 November order was restored.

== Causes ==
Electoral workers did not publicly list the winners of the elections, and rumours began that the election was won by the candidate of the People's Democratic Party (PDP), barrister Timothy Gyang Buba, defeating the candidate for the All Nigerian Peoples Party. People from the largely Muslim Hausa community, began protesting even before the results were released, which resulted in clashes that claimed hundreds of lives between Muslims and Christians, who largely supported Buba.

Similar riots in 2001 between Christians and Muslims in Jos also resulted in death of hundreds. A 2004 riot in Yelwa, another town in Plateau State resulted in the so-called Yelwa Massacre. Fighting in the north-central Kaduna State when it tried to impose shari'a law in 2000, resulted in the partition of Kaduna. This was followed by the Kaduna riots of November 2002, resulting from Nigeria's hosting of the Miss World contest, which one of its contestants had won the previous year.

== Riots ==
The two days of rioting led to the death of at least 761 people, and homes, mosques, churches and schools were damaged or burned by mobs. The Nigerian Red Cross Society reported that 10,000 people fled their homes due to the riots, and were living in government-provided shelters. Nigerian soldiers were sent into Jos to break up the fighting and create a buffer zone between the Christians and Muslims. Flights to and from Jos were cancelled and roads to the north were blocked.

== Effects ==
Jonah Jang, the governor of the Plateau State, imposed a 24-hour curfew on four districts of the city, and soldiers were permitted to "shoot on sight" to prevent more violence. Human Rights Watch alleged that soldiers and police carried out more than 130 extrajudicial killings while responding to the riots. Many armed youths of both sides were arrested at military roadblocks. Police reported that more than 500 people were arrested as a result of the riots. But state officials said no one was successfully prosecuted.

== See also ==
- 2001 Jos riots
- 2010 Jos riots
