= Izghe =

Izge
- Village
- Izge
- Location within Nigeria
- Coordinates: 10°58′59.88″N 13°18′0″E
- Country: Nigeria
- State: Borno
- Local Government Area: Gwoza

Izge is a village in Gwoza Local Government Area, Borno State, Nigeria.

A massacre by Boko Haram on 15 February 2014 left 106 residents of the village dead. A second raid occurred a few days later, in which the village was burned to the ground.

== See also ==
- Izghe attack
