= February 2014 Buni Yadi massacre =

Massacre in Yobe State, Nigeria

Coordinates: 11.2689°N 11.9969°E

Federal Government College Buni Yadi attack
- Part of the Boko Haram insurgency
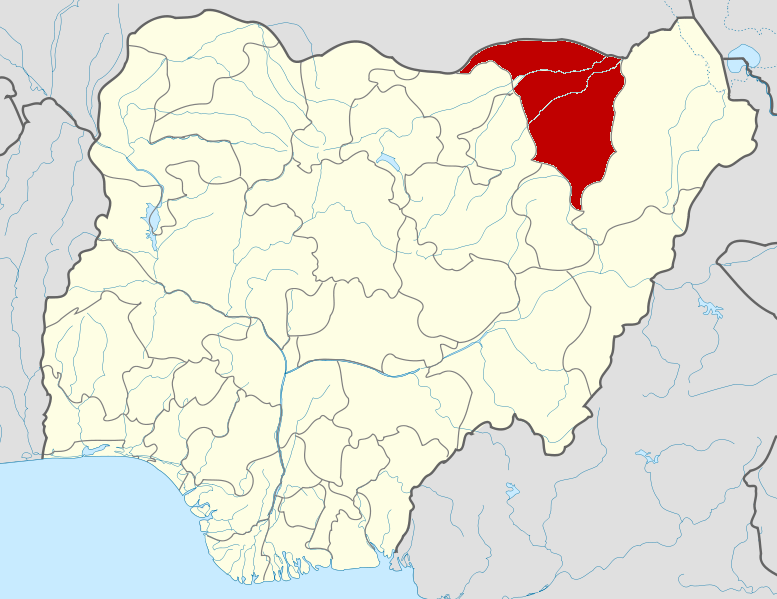
- Location of Yobe State in Nigeria
- Location: Yobe State, Nigeria
- Date: 25 February 2014
- Target: Federal Government College
- Attack type: School bombing
- Weapons: Explosives, firearms
- Deaths: 59
- Perpetrator: Boko Haram

On 25 February 2014, fifty-nine boys were killed at the Federal Government College of Buni Yadi in Yobe State, Nigeria. The twenty-four buildings of the school were also burned down as a result of the attack. No group has claimed responsibility for the attack, but according to media and local officials the Islamist militants Boko Haram are believed to be behind the attack.

== Background ==
The Federal Government College is a boarding school located in Buni Yadi, a town in Yobe State, Nigeria. The co-educational secondary school had twenty-four buildings at the time of the attack.

Islamic militants have been in conflict with the government in Northern Nigeria since 2009. Militant groups have increasingly focused on targeting civilians since May 2013 when President Goodluck Jonathan authorized the military to eliminate the resistance. The violence has brought increased instability to Nigeria, the top petroleum producer in Africa. In February 2014, militants were responsible for 300 deaths, mostly of civilians. In late February, the government shut the Nigeria–Cameroon border in an attempt to keep militants from launching attacks in Nigeria and then fleeing into Cameroon.

The militant group Boko Haram, whose name means "Western education is sinful", has targeted schools with violent attacks on a number of occasions. The group has been officially labelled a terrorist organization in Nigeria and the United States, and large rewards have been offered for information leading to the capture of the group's leadership. More than 1,000 deaths were attributed to Boko Haram between May 2013 and February 2014. The group has burnt more than 200 schools, according to official figures. Abubakar Shekau, suspected leader of Boko Haram, issued a video statement in mid-February 2014 promising to continue the group's campaign against western values and threatening to broaden the scope of attacks.

A week before the Buni Yadi attack, Boko Haram members killed 60 people in the town of Bama in neighbouring Borno State; four days before that attack, the militants killed 106 in Izghe, a mostly Christian village; and three weeks before that the Islamists killed 78 in two attacks in the region.

== Attack ==
On 25 February 2014, militants barged into the Federal Government College while the students were sleeping. They threw explosives into dorm rooms as they sprayed the rooms with gunfire. According to an eye-witness "students were trying to climb out of the windows and they were slaughtered like sheep by the terrorists who slit their throats. Others who ran were gunned down." All twenty-four buildings were burnt to the ground during the attack.

Fifty-nine boys were killed in the attack. Some died from gunshots or knife wounds, while others were burned to death. Survivors and victims' bodies were taken to Sani Abacha Specialist Hospital in the state capital, Damaturu. A hospital spokesperson said it appeared that the militants had intentionally "spared" female students.

According to media reports, the attack "bore the hallmarks" of Boko Haram. Local officials also attributed the attack to the group, but no claim of responsibility was made.

== Aftermath ==
President Goodluck Jonathan called the Federal Government College attack "callous and senseless murder ... by deranged terrorists and fanatics who have clearly lost all human morality and descended to bestiality". He vowed to "permanently eradicate the scourge of terrorism". UN Secretary-General Ban Ki-moon condemned the attack saying "no objective can justify such violence" and said he was "deeply concerned about the increasing frequency and brutality of attacks".

Relatives of the attack victims surrounded the morgue angrily demanding answers. The military had to take control of the building to restore order. The government's failure to prevent the Federal Government College attack and similar incidents has led to public anger in northeast Nigeria. Students across the region refused to sleep in their boarding schools after the attack and returned to their family homes.

== Investigation ==
According to the Yobe State Government, soldiers guarding a checkpoint near the attack site had withdrawn from their post hours before the attack. State governor Ibrahim Gaidam blamed the withdrawal for the attack and said the national military had failed to protect the students. A national military spokesperson, however, said the checkpoint had been dismantled earlier as part of a Joint Task Force operation. He said bad phone lines, possibly cut by the attackers, had prevented the military from hearing about the attack in time to respond. Boko Haram is suspected to have started the attack as part of its fight "to create an Islamic state" in Nigeria's mainly Muslim north.

== See also ==
- Yobe State school shooting
- Timeline of Boko Haram insurgency
