= Deputy governor of Borno State =

Second highest-ranking official in the executive branch of Borno State in Nigeria

Deputy Governor of Borno State
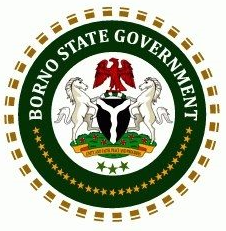
- Seal of Borno State

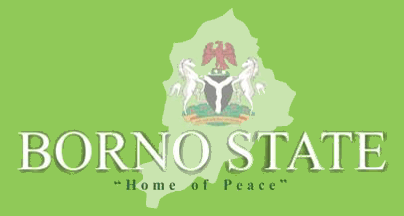
- Flag of Borno State
- Incumbent; Umar Usman Kadafur since 29 May 2019
- Executive Branch of the Borno State Government
- Style: Deputy Governor (informal); His Excellency (courtesy)
- Status: Second highest executive branch officer
- Member of: Borno State Executive Branch; Borno State Cabinet
- Seat: Maiduguri
- Nominator: Gubernatorial candidate
- Appointer: Direct popular election or, if vacant, Governor via House of Assembly confirmation
- Term length: Four years renewable once
- Constituting instrument: Constitution of Nigeria
- Inaugural holder: Ali Abubakar Jatau (Fourth Republic)
- Succession: First
- Website: bornostate.gov.ng

The deputy governor of Borno State is the second-highest officer in the executive branch of the government of Borno State, Nigeria, after the governor of Borno State, and ranks first in line of succession. The deputy governor is directly elected together with the governor to a four-year term of office.

Umar Usman Kadafur is the current deputy governor, having assumed office on 29 May 2019.

== Qualifications ==
As in the case of the Governor, in order to be qualified to be elected as deputy governor, a person must:

- be at least thirty-five (35) years of age;
- be a Nigerian citizen by birth;
- be a member of a political party with endorsement by that political party;
- have School Certificate or its equivalent.

== Responsibilities ==
The deputy governor assists the governor in exercising primary assignments and is also eligible to replace a dead, impeached, absent or ill Governor as required by the 1999 Constitution of Nigeria.

== List of deputy governors ==
Name	Took office	Left office	Time in office	Party	Elected	Governor
Ali Abubakar Jatau	29 May 1999	29 May 2003	4 years	All Peoples Party	1999	Mala Kachalla
Adamu Shettima Yuguda Dibal	29 May 2003	29 May 2011	8 years	All Nigeria Peoples Party	2003; 2007	Ali Modu Sheriff
Zannah Umar Mustapha (1966–2015)	29 May 2011	15 August 2015	4 years, 78 days	All Progressives Congress	2011; 2015	Kashim Shettima
Usman Mamman Durkwa	17 October 2015	29 May 2019	3 years, 224 days	All Progressives Congress		Kashim Shettima
Umar Usman Kadafur (born 1976)	29 May 2019	Incumbent	7 years, 101 days	All Progressives Congress	2019; 2023	Babagana Zulum

== See also ==
- List of governors of Borno State
