= 1991 Borno State gubernatorial election =

1991 gubernatorial election in Borno State, Nigeria

Borno gubernatorial election
- December 14, 1991
| Nominee | Maina Maaji Lawan |
| Party | SDP |
Elected Governor
Maina Maaji Lawan
SDP

The 1991 Borno State gubernatorial election occurred on December 14, 1991. SDP candidate Maina Maaji Lawan won the election.

== Conduct ==
The gubernatorial election was conducted using an open ballot system. Primaries for the two parties to select their flag bearers were conducted on October 19, 1991.

The election occurred on December 14, 1991. SDP candidate Maina Maaji Lawan won the election.
