= 1999 Borno State gubernatorial election =

1999 gubernatorial election in Borno State, Nigeria

- January 9, 1999
Nominee	Mala Kachalla	Baba Ahmad Jidda
Party	All People's Party (Nigeria)	PDP
Running mate	Ali Abubakar
Popular vote	388,058	348,800
Governor before election
Maina Maaji Lawan
SDP
Elected Governor
Mala Kachalla
All People's Party (Nigeria)

The 1999 Borno State gubernatorial election occurred in Nigeria on January 9, 1999. The APP nominee Mala Kachalla won the election, defeating the PDP candidate, Baba Ahmad Jidda.

Mala Kachalla emerged APP candidate, while Baba Ahmad Jidda emerged the PDP candidate.

== Electoral system ==
The Governor of Borno State is elected using the plurality voting system.

== Primary election ==
=== APP primary ===
The APP primary election was won by Mala Kachalla.

=== PDP primary ===
The PDP primary election was won by Baba Ahmad Jidda.

== Results ==
The total number of registered voters in the state was 1,690,943. Total number of votes cast was 765,241 while number of valid votes was 741,953. Rejected votes were 23,288.

Candidate	Party	Votes	%
Mala Kachalla	All People's Party	388,058	52.66
Baba Ahmad Jidda	People's Democratic Party	348,800	47.34
Total		736,858	100.00
Valid votes		736,858	96.94
Invalid/blank votes		23,288	3.06
Total votes		760,146	100.00
Registered voters/turnout		1,690,943	44.95
Source: Nigeria World, IFES, Semantics Scholar
