= Kashim Ibrahim-Imam =

Nigerian politician

Kashim Ibrahim-Imam was born 8 May 1962, he is a Nigerian politician who was twice the People's Democratic Party (PDP) candidate for Governor of Borno State in 2003 and 2007, losing both times to the All Nigeria Peoples Party (ANPP) candidate Ali Modu Sheriff.

== Early career ==
Ibrahim-Imam was born into a political family. His father, Ibrahim Imam was the motivating force of the progressive Borno Youth Movement. He earned degrees in Political Science and International Economic Relations from Ahmadu Bello University, Zaria and the University of Maiduguri. He then entered the banking industry. He was given the title of "Mutawalli Borno", a senior councillor to the Shehu (traditional ruler) of Borno. He was a childhood friend and business partner of his political opponent in Borno State, Ali Modu Sheriff.

During the short-lived Nigerian Third Republic Ibrahim-Imam was Borno State chairman of the Social Democratic Party(SDP). He was removed from this position by Maina Maaji Lawan, the Borno State Governor at that time. Ibrahim-Imam was a member of Hope 93, the political group at the forefront of the MKO Abiola campaign in the 1993 elections.

== Fourth Republic ==
Ibrahim-Imam was appointed Presidential Liaison Officer to the Senate at the start of President Olusegun Obasanjo's administration.

In the February 2003 PDP primaries for Borno State Governorship candidate, Ibrahim-Imam was said to be competing in part to prevent Lawan becoming governor again. He easily beat four other contestants to represent the PDP in the gubernatorial elections, gaining 177 of the 185 votes cast. In the April elections, Ali Modu Sheriff of the All Nigeria Peoples Party (ANPP) gained 581,880 votes, Kashim came second with 341,537 votes for the PDP and the incumbent Governor Mala Kachalla, who had moved from the ANPP to compete on the Alliance for Democracy (AD) ticket, gained 336,165 votes. Kashim said the election was not fair or free. He competed again in the 2007 elections and lost to Sheriff again.

In April 2008 Ibrahim-Imam claimed that former Vice President Atiku Abubakar had ordered the demolition of his house because of his loyalty to former president Obasanjo. Atiku denied the charge.
