= Shettima (name) =

Shettima can be a masculine given name, a middle name, or a surname. Notable people with the name include:

== Given name ==
- Shettima Ali Monguno, Nigerian politician
- Shettima Mustafa (1939–2022), Nigerian politician
- Shettima Shehu, former member of the Nigerian National Assembly

== Middle name ==
- Lawan Shettima Ali, Nigerian politician

== Surname ==
- Kashim Shettima, Vice President of Nigeria since 2023
- Nana Shettima, Second Lady of Nigeria since 2023
