= Haliru Mohammed Bello =

Nigerian politician

Chairman of the PDP Board of Trustees Acting
- In office 25 May 2015 – 10 February 2016
- Preceded by: Anthony Anenih
- Succeeded by: Walid Jibrin

Minister of Defense
- In office July 2011 – 22 June 2012
- Preceded by: Adetokunbo Kayode
- Succeeded by: Erelu Olusola Obada

Federal Minister of Communications
- In office June 2001 – May 2003
- Preceded by: Mohammed Arzika
- Succeeded by: Cornelius Adebayo

Personal details
- Born: 9 October 1945 (age 80) Birnin Kebbi, Kebbi, Nigeria
- Party: Peoples Democratic Party (PDP)

Haliru Mohammed Bello (born 9 October 1945) is a Nigerian politician. He was trained in veterinary medicine. He held various administrative positions under the military governments before 1999. He was the Minister of Communications from June 2001 to May 2003. After he left office he was indicted in a bribery scandal involving the German telecom company Siemens AG.

He was Defense Minister from July 2011 until June 2012. He was appointed the acting National Chairman of the People's Democratic Party of Nigeria on 25 May 2015.

== Early years ==
Haliru Mohammed Bello was born in Birnin Kebbi, Kebbi State, on 9 October 1945. After his primary education in Birnin Kebbi he attended Government College, Zaria, now Berewa College. He was admitted to Ahmadu Bello University, Zaria in 1966, and studied veterinary medicine.

He became a lecturer at Ahmadu Bello University and a Fellow of the College of Veterinary Surgeons of Nigeria.

In 1977 Mohammed was appointed Commissioner for Agriculture for Sokoto State under the military government of General Olusegun Obasanjo, and then Commissioner for Education for Sokoto State. After the return to civilian rule in 1979 Mohammed ran unsuccessfully for Deputy Governor of Sokoto State on the Great Nigeria People's Party (GNPP) platform. He was GNPP Secretary for Sokoto State until December 1983, when the military resumed power under Muhammadu Buhari and banned party politics. Mohammed worked for a private company, and then was appointed first Assistant General Manager and then General Manager of the Rima River Basin and Rural Development Authority, a Federal Ministry of Water Resources agency.

General Ibrahim Babangida appointed Haliru Mohammed as Comptroller General of the Nigerian Customs Service in 1988. He was the first Comptroller General of the Customs and Excise department, then a service of the Ministry of Internal Affairs, under a new decentralized arrangement that began on 16 February 1988. He held this post until 1994, when General Sani Abacha replaced him by Brigadier General S. O. G. Ango.

During the 1995-98 transition program, Mohammed was a founding member of the Democratic Party of Nigeria (DPN). After the death of Abacha, Mohammed was one of the founders of the People's Democratic Party (PDP) in Kebbi State.

In September 1999 President Olusegun Obasanjo appointed Mohammed as a Commissioner on the Revenue Mobilization Allocation and Fiscal Commission.

== Minister of Communications ==
Mohammed became the minister of Communications in June 2001 in a minor reshuffle of the cabinet of President Olusegun Obasanjo, replacing Mohammed Arzika. He was appointed at a time when the government was planning to privatise Nigerian Telecommunications Limited (NITEL). In December 2001, Mohammed said that the regulator had been mistaken in revalidating the analog mobile licence granted to MTS First Mobile, which could interfere with plans for the nation's GSM network. He said the government was instead encouraging MTS to go into fixed and rural telephony. In September 2002 Mohammed announced that 400,000 lines were being installed to expend NITEL's GSM network in the North-west zone. In May 2003 Mohammed approved revised regulations for interconnection between telephone companies designed to foster competition. Mohammed left office in May 2003.

=== Subsequent bribery scandals ===
In 2007 a German court named several prominent Nigerians, including Mohammed, in a bribery scandal involving communications firm Siemens AG. Mohammed was alleged to have collected €70,000 in two installments, a charge that he denied. In total the court found that Siemens had paid out €12 million in bribes to obtain contracts in Nigeria and other countries, and fined the company €201 million. In November 2007, the German authorities provided fresh information on the Siemens bribery scandal.

The Independent Corrupt Practices and Other Related Offences Commission (ICPC) launched an investigation. President Umaru Yar'Adua said of the case "... there will neither be sacred cows nor a cover up for anybody found culpable of breaching the law".

In January 2010, another scandal emerged over a N5 billion contract for supply of equipment to (M-tel), a subsidiary of NITEL. The Economic and Financial Crimes Commission (EFCC) launched an investigation. In 2002, Mohammed had looked into complaints by Ericsson over the conduct of Motorola in trying to win a contract, and on the basis of his findings the contract was awarded to Ericsson. Mohammed was not accused of wrongdoing in this case.

== Later career ==
=== PDP leader ===
In June 2004 Mohammed was elected as PDP National Vice Chairman for the North West Zone, which consisted of the states of Kaduna, Katsina, Kano, Kebbi, Sokoto, Jigawa and Zamfara.< In March 2008 Mohammed became Deputy National Chairman of the PDP.

In August 2008 Mohammed received the Diamond Nigerian Telecoms Award at a ceremony in Lagos. In January 2011, he was appointed Acting National Chairman of the PDP after Okwesilieze Nwodo was suspended by the Enugu High Court.

Mohammed supported a change to the PDP's zoning system so that President Goodluck Jonathan could run for reelection in 2011, rather than making a northerner the party's candidate.

=== Minister of Defense ===
Mohammed was Minister of Defense under President Goodluck Jonathan between 2011 and 2012.He was removed on 22 June 2012 during a period of escalating security problems in the north including bomb attacks by Boko Haram extremists.

=== Acting Chairman of the PDP ===
Following the resignation of PDP Board of Trustees (BOT) Chairman, Anthony Anenih, the BOT appointed Haliru Mohammed as its Acting Chairman. Mohammed’s nomination was endorsed on 25 May 2015 by the BOT at a meeting at the Aso Rock presidential villa in Abuja. The decision was unexpected, as Anenih had said he was resigning so that Jonathan could take the post. On 10 February 2016, Bello was relieved of his duty after it was revealed that he was being prosecuted in connection with the alleged diversion of arms procurement funds.

=== Controversy ===
The Economic and Financial Crimes Commission has already filed charges against him for an alleged role in the diversion of funds meant for the procurement of arms in the office of the National Security Adviser.

Party political offices
Preceded by Okwesilieze Nwodo	Chairperson of the National Working Committee; Acting; 2010	Succeeded by Kawu Baraje
