= 2016 PDP National Convention =

The 2016 PDP National Convention was held on Saturday, 21 May 2016 at the Sharks Stadium in Port Harcourt, Rivers State. It marked the first time the National Convention took place outside Abuja, Nigeria's federal capital. The convention drew delegates from the 36 states, as well as the 12 governors of the PDP, national and state assembly members, former governors, Board of Trustees members and former National Working Committee members. Among those who graced the convention were the Deputy Senate President Ike Ekweremadu, Senator Godswill Akpabio and former Senate President David Mark.

Although well attended, incumbent acting chair of the National Working Committee Ali Modu Sheriff withdrew from the event earlier that day. Sheriff had announced a postponement of the convention over legal issues. This however didn't go down well with some members who declared that the convention must go on as scheduled. After Sheriff's departure, the convention simply continued. Ahmed Makarfi, a former governor, was appointed alongside 6 others to replace Sheriff and the NWC in a caretaker capacity. They will run the affairs of the party until a National Working Committee is elected within 90 days.

== Convention Committee ==
The Convention Committee was set up on 5 April 2016 to help plan, organize and coordinate the event. Members of the executive include Ezenwo Nyesom Wike (Chairman), Darius Ishaku (Deputy Chairman) and Dave Umahi (Secretary). The committee's inaugural meeting was held at Government House, Port Harcourt on 9 April 2016. The meeting had 17 of its prominent members in attendance.

== National Caretaker Committee ==
The setting up of a Caretaker Committee to manage the affairs of the party prior to the election of a new National Working Committee was approved by delegates present at the convention venue.

Chairperson of the Committee is former governor, Ahmed Makarfi while the Secretary is Ben Obi. Other members of the Committee include: Odion Ugbesia (Financial, Treasury and Audit), Prince Dayo Adeyeye (Publicity), Abdul Ningi (Organization and Mobilization), Aisha Aliyu (Women and Youth) and Barrister Kabiru Usman (Legal).

== See also ==
- PDP National Working Committee
