= 2007 Borno State gubernatorial election =

6th gubernatorial election of Borno State

- 14 April 2007
Nominee	Ali Modu Sheriff	Kashim Ibrahim-Imam
Party	ANPP	PDP
Popular vote	688,763	307,764
Governor before election
Ali Modu Sheriff
ANPP
Elected Governor
Ali Modu Sheriff
ANPP

The 2007 Borno State gubernatorial election was the 6th gubernatorial election of Borno State. Held on 14 April 2011, the All Nigeria Peoples Party nominee Ali Modu Sheriff won the election, defeating Kashim Ibrahim-Imam of the People's Democratic Party.

== Results ==
A total of 11 candidates contested in the election. Ali Modu Sheriff from the All Nigeria Peoples Party won the election, defeating Kashim Ibrahim-Imam from the People's Democratic Party. Registered voters was 2,159,515.

2007 Borno State gubernatorial election
Party	Candidate	Votes	%	±%
ANPP	Ali Modu Sheriff	688,763		
PDP	Kashim Ibrahim-Imam	307,764		
ANPP hold				
