= Network Against Corruption and Trafficking =

Nigerian NGO against corruption and trafficking

- Abbreviation: NACAT
- Type: Civil society organization
- Legal status: Registered under Part "C" of the Companies and Allied Matters Act, Cap C20, Laws of the Federation of Nigeria, 2004
- Purpose: Combating corruption, financial crimes, terrorism, economic sabotage, human and drug trafficking
- Location: Nigeria
- Website: nacatinitiative.org

Network Against Corruption and Trafficking (NACAT) is a Nigerian civil society organization focused on addressing corruption, financial crimes, terrorism, economic sabotage, human trafficking, and drug trafficking. It was founded in June 2022.

== Activities ==
NACAT also promotes governance, transparency, the rule of law, and the security and well-being of Nigerians in the pursuit of nation-building.

The organization collaborated with the National Drug Law Enforcement Agency (NDLEA) and the Independent Corrupt Practices Commission (ICPC) to conduct sensitization campaigns against drug abuse, human trafficking, and corruption.

In September 2023, the organization in partnership with NDLEA carried out a sensitization exercise against the use of hard drugs in Abuja community known as Abattoir.

In October 2023, NACAT carried out human signpost sensitization in Nyanya area of Abuja to alight Nigerians on the effect of drugs abuse.

Awareness Program at Baze University (October 2024). During the university's Career Week, NACAT conducted a session on "Financially Motivated Sexual Extortion and Trafficking." Topics included cyberbullying, sextortion, and the dangers of trafficking. The organization shared global case studies and offered online safety tips while presenting its "See Something, Say Something" campaign. Thereafter, NACAT partnered with the Canadian Broadcasting Corporation to produce a documentary on the prevalence of internet scam especially sextortion in Nigeria.

NACAT has been involved in rescuing trafficking victims, such as a Nigerian woman trafficked to Oman.

In 2025, the organization launched the Student Network Against Corruption and Trafficking (S-NACAT) club at Dorben College of Digital Technology, Dutse, Abuja. The initiative focuses on empowering students as agents of change against corruption, drug abuse, and human trafficking.

In 2026, NACAT conducted multiple road walks, community sensitization programs in areas such as Gwagwalada, and joined NAPTIP for the 16 Days of Activism against Gender-Based Violence.

In March 2026, the organization convened a high-level Roundtable on “Rights, Justice, and Action for Women and Girls” as part of International Women’s Day activities.

As part of its 2026 activities, the organization completed step-down training from the West Africa Civil Society Institute (WACSI) Digital Rights Activism program to strengthen its media and digital advocacy tools.

On May 18, 2026, the Network Against Corruption and Trafficking (NACAT), in collaboration with the Child and Youth Protection Foundation (CYPF), organised a football tournament in Abuja to mark the International Day of the Boy Child. The event, themed “Stand Tall, Play Strong: Promoting a Positive Mindset in Boys,” engaged students from various secondary schools, including those with hearing disabilities, through sports, mentorship, and panel discussions aimed at building resilience, emotional intelligence, and positive values.

On May 21, 2026, the Network Against Corruption and Trafficking (NACAT) held a sensitization seminar at BabyLove (Glow Bearers) School in Abuja to educate primary and junior secondary students on the dangers of drug abuse. The programme featured interactive sessions, an animated video, and presentations.

== Whistle-blowing and advocacy ==
NACAT engaged in whistle-blowing and advocacy to expose corruption cases involving Nigerian politicians. The organization petitioned law enforcement agencies and pursued legal action against the accused to promote justice and transparency.

In May 2023, the organization petitioned the Economic and Financial Crimes Commission (EFCC) over alleged financial impropriety against Gov. Ben Ayade of Cross River. NACAT in a news conference in Abuja cited an audit report of the state treasury between 2015 and 2020, accusing Ayade of squandered state resources.

Still in 2023, NACAT revealed that hard drugs from neighbouring states are concealed in cows and transported to the Federal Capital Capital (FCT) to evade arrest.

In January 2024, it held a press conference appealing to President Bola Ahmed Tinubu to address the delay in the investigation of former Governor of Cross River State, Prof. Ben Ayade, over corruption allegations.

In April 2024, NACAT submitted to the House of Representatives Committee on Public Petitions various outstanding corruption petitions against some heads and top officials of agencies in Nigeria.

Still in 2024, the organization sustained its whistle-blowing and advocacy efforts against corruption in high places. NACAT petitioned the EFCC against former Delta State Governor, Senator Ifeanyi Okowa, over alleged diversion of over N1.3 trillion in 13% derivation funds. The petition contributed to Okowa’s arrest and detention by the EFCC in November of the year.

NACAT also petitioned the EFCC and ICPC against former Akwa Ibom State Governor, Udom Emmanuel, alleging diversion of about N700 billion during his tenure. The petition led to Emmanuel’s arrest by the EFCC in March 2025.

In December 2025, NACAT petitioned President Bola Tinubu, the EFCC, and ICPC over alleged N500 billion fraud and procurement violations at the Energy Commission of Nigeria involving Director-General Mustapha Abdullahi. The petition resulted in Abdullahi’s arrest by the EFCC in May 2026.

In May 2026, NACAT issued a strong press statement condemning the clearance of politicians facing EFCC/ICPC probes to contest the 2027 general elections, describing it as a serious threat to national integrity and the fight against corruption.

On May 16, 2026, the Network Against Corruption and Trafficking raised serious concerns over President Bola Tinubu’s disclosure that Nigeria will spend about $11.6 billion on debt servicing in 2026 while also planning to secure an additional $1.25 billion World Bank loan. NACAT described the situation as alarming, noting that despite the 2023 fuel subsidy removal which was promised to improve the economy and fund development, Nigerians continue to face worsening poverty, inflation, and hardship amid increasing borrowing. The organisation called on the Federal Government to publish a transparent account of subsidy savings, disclose details of all loans and beneficiaries, and ensure accountability in debt management to prevent corruption, protect national development, and restore public trust.

== Charity work ==
In 2022, the organization conducted charity programs in Abuja as part of its Corporate Social Responsibility, extending support to the local community.

In 2023, the organization initiated a scheme it called 8k Palliative where its staff were visiting vulnerable families to donate N8,000 to them.

In 2023, the organization adopted the Poorest of the Poor Rehabilitation Center (ANAWIM Home) as its annual Corporate Social Responsibility (CSR) beneficiary. It donated food, toiletries, and financial aid to orphans, and individuals facing mental health challenges at the orphanage facility.

As part of its activities for ending the year, in November, 2024, the co-founder of the Network Against Corruption and Trafficking, Fejiro Oliver Samson, called on wealthy and well-meaning Nigerians to improve educational standards for underprivileged and special-needs children by renovating dilapidated schools in slum communities. Speaking in Lugbe, Abuja, Samson emphasized that quality education begins with a conducive learning environment and urged privileged individuals to provide children in disadvantaged areas with the same standard of school infrastructure enjoyed by children abroad. He challenged Nigerians with the means to adopt and refurbish neglected schools in slums, describing education as the key pathway to a child’s success and future development.

In March, 2025, the Network Against Corruption and Trafficking donated bags of rice, cartons of spaghetti, sanitary pads, and a sewing machine to Internally Displaced Persons (IDPs) at the Durumi Camp in Abuja as part of its humanitarian and corporate social responsibility efforts. During the outreach, NACAT also educated women in the camp on the dangers of human trafficking, common tactics used by traffickers, and ways to protect themselves and their children.
