= Muhammad Mustapha Abdallah =

Nigerian Professional Security Officer

Chairman National Drug Law Enforcement Agency
- In office 11 January 2016 – January 2021
- Preceded by: Ahmadu Giade
- Succeeded by: Mohammed Buba Marwa

Personal details
- Born: 13 November 1954 (age 71) Hong, Adamawa State, Nigeria
- Education: Nigerian Defence Academy; Ahmadu Bello University; Sam Houston State University

Muhammad Mustapha Abdallah (born 13 November 1954) is a retired Nigerian Army Colonel who served as Chairman of the National Drug Law Enforcement Agency appointed to the post by President Muhammadu Buhari on 11 January 2016.
