= Muhammed Kadade Suleiman =

Nigerian politician

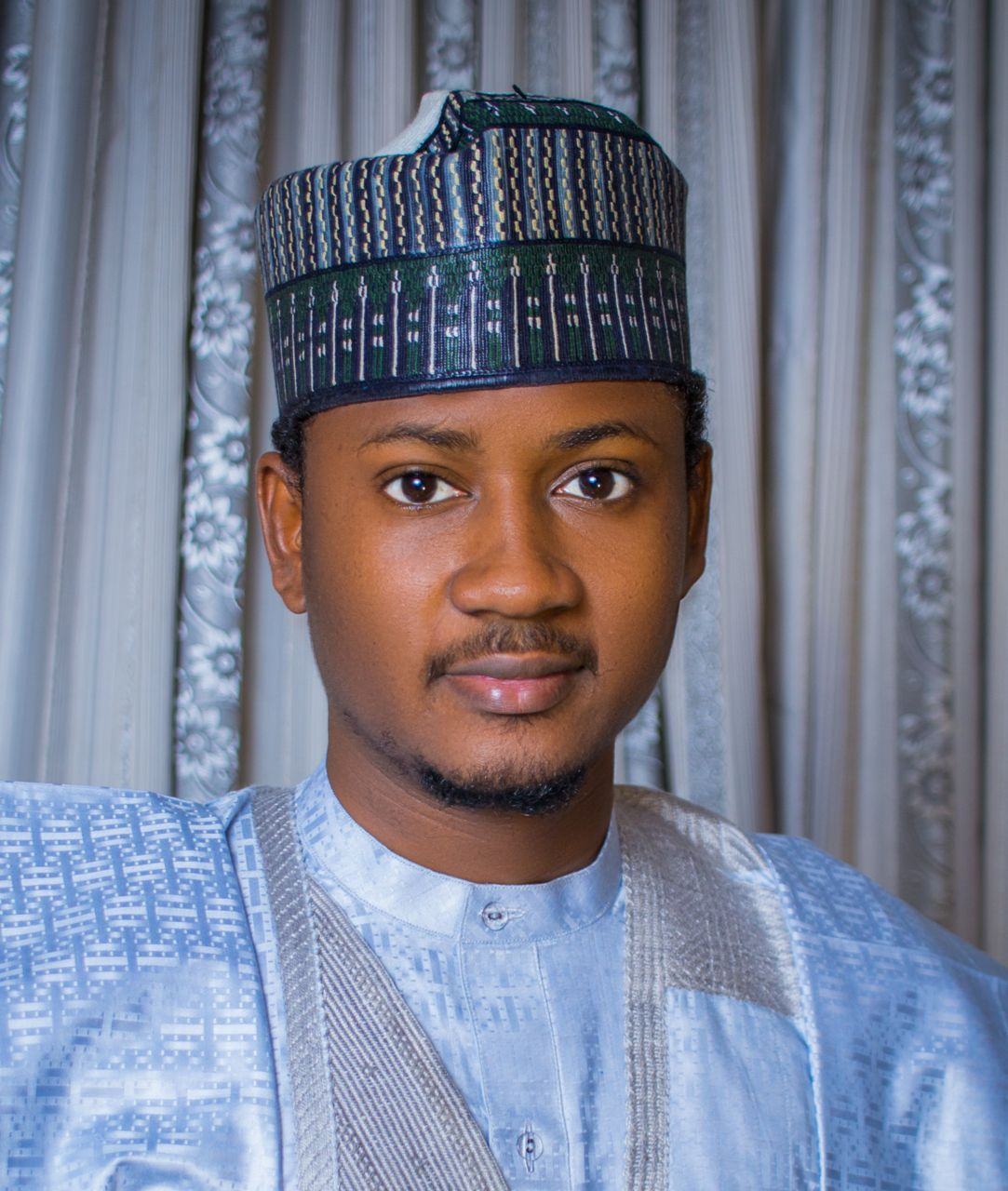

National Youth Leader of Peoples Democratic Party
- Incumbent
- Assumed office December 2021
- Preceded by: S. K. E. Udeh-Okoye

Personal details
- Born: July 7, 1996 (age 29) Makarfi, Kaduna State, Nigeria
- Party: Peoples Democratic Party

Muhammad Kadade Suleiman (born July 7, 1996) is a Nigerian Politician from Kaduna State. He contested for the seat of Kaduna state governor during the 2019 Nigerian general election. He is the current National Youth Leader of People Democratic Party and member of PDP National Working Committee.

== Background ==
Muhammed Kadade Suleiman hail from Nasarawan Doya Village, Makarfi Local Government Area in Kaduna State. Born in 1996, he comes from a distinguished lineage, being the son of the late Dan-Malikin Zazzau and the grandson of emir of Nasarawan Doya. He holds a distinguished traditional title as the Santurakin Nasarawan Doya.

== Political career ==
From a young age, Muhammed showed a keen interest in politics, aligning himself with the Peoples Democratic Party(PDP) and actively participating at various levels. At the age of 25, Muhammed achieved a significant milestone by becoming the National Youth Leader of the People's Democratic Party (PDP). This remarkable accomplishment garnered widespread acclaim and was seen as a positive step toward increasing youth political participation in Nigeria.

== Recognitions and awards ==
Muhammed's achievements have also earned him global recognition. He was honored as one of the top 100 under 40 Most Influential People of African Descendants (MIPAD), he was recognized for organizing a forum on Intergenerational Synergy on Government to commemorate the 2022 International Youth Day. The award was given under the auspices of the International Decade for People of African Descent. Additionally, he was bestowed the Royal African Award by the Ooni of Ife Oba Adeyeye Enitan Ogunwusi. In May 2023, he received Nigerian National honour of Commander of the Order of the Niger (MON) by President Muhammadu Buhari.

== See also ==
- Iyorchia Ayu
- PDP National Working Committee
- Peoples Democratic Party
- Samuel Anyanwu
