= 2015 Borno State gubernatorial election =

2015 gubernatorial election in Borno State, Nigeria

- (Nigeria)
- April 11, 2015
- Turnout: 0.39%
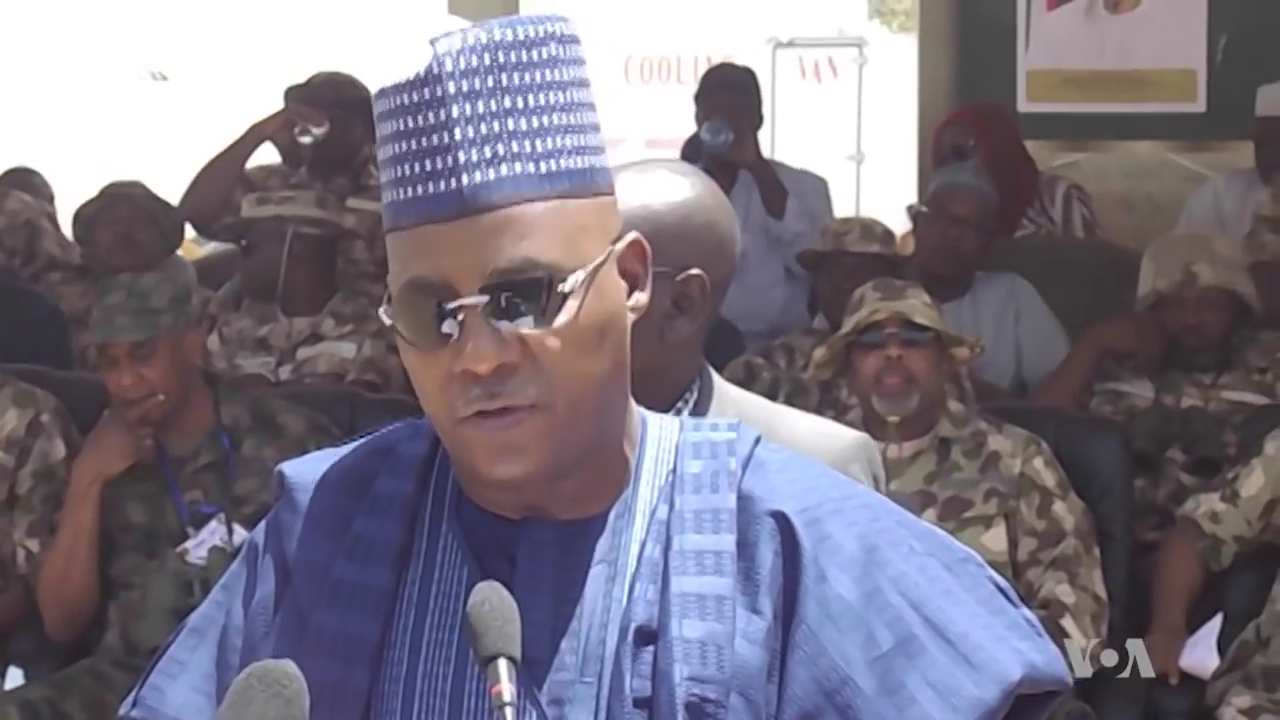
Nominee	Kashim Shettima	Gambo Lawan
Party	APC	PDP
Running mate	Zannah Umar Mustapha
Popular vote	649,913	34,731
Percentage	94.92%	5.08%
Governor before election
Kashim Shettima
ANPP
Elected Governor
Kashim Shettima
APC

The 2015 Borno State gubernatorial election occurred on April 11, 2015. Incumbent Governor APC's Kashim Shettima won election for a second term, defeating PDP's Gambo Lawan and several minor party candidates. Shettima received 94.92% of the vote.

Kashim Shettima emerged unopposed in the APC gubernatorial primary after all the aspirants stepped down. He retained his deputy, Zannah Mustapha, as his running mate.

Gambo Lawan was the PDP candidate.

== Electoral system ==
The Governor of Borno State is elected using the plurality voting system.

== Primary election ==
=== APC primary ===
The APC primary election was held on in the evening of Friday, December 4, 2014, at the Elkanemi Sports Centre in Maiduguri, with a total of 4,520 delegates present from all wards of the state's 27 LGAs. Incumbent governor, Kashim Shettima, became the party's sole candidate after other aspirants stepped down for him days before.

=== Candidates ===
- Party nominee: Kashim Shettima: Incumbent governor.
- Running mate: Zannah Mustapha.

=== PDP primary ===
The PDP primary election was held in December 2014. Gambori Lawan emerged winner. However, following a replacement of his name with that of Mohammed Imam, he filed a suit at a federal high court in Abuja, which ordered the party to return his name.

=== Candidates ===
- Party nominee: Gambo Lawan.
- Running mate:

== Results ==
APC Governor Kashim Shettima won re-election for a second term, defeating PDP Gambo Lawan and several minor party candidates. Shettima received 94.92% of the votes, while Lawan received 5.08%.

The total number of registered voters in the state was 1,407,777 while the total number of votes cast was 690,182.

Candidate	Party	Votes	%
Kashim Shettima	All Progressives Congress (APC)	649,913	94.93
Gambo Lawan	People's Democratic Party (PDP)	34,731	5.07
Others			
Total		684,644	100.00
Registered voters/turnout		1,407,777	–
Source: Stears

=== By local government area ===
Here are the results of the election from 20 of the 27 local government areas of the state for the two major parties. Blue represents LGAs won by Shettima. Green represents LGAs won by Lawan.

County	Kashim Shettima APC		Gambo Lawan PDP		Total votes
County	#	%	#	%	#
Abadam	7,070		61		
Askira/Uba	26,313		2,023		
Bayo	17,968		1,985		
Biu	51,621		781		
Damboa	36,808		165		
Dikwa	11,168		210		
Gubio	11,487		107		
Guzamala	8,361		12		
Gwoza	40,359		723		
Jere	62,029		1,443		
Kaga	10,414		105		
Kala/Balge	10,474		68		
Kukawa	12,486		293		
Kwaya Kusar	18,678		1,620		
Mafa	10,734		59		
Magumeri	10,038		384		
Marte	6,388		301		
Mobbar	6,979		218		
Monguno	9,840		31		
Nganzai	3,696		74		
Totals	529,430		17,574		547,004
