= Usman Mamman Durkwa =

Nigerian politician

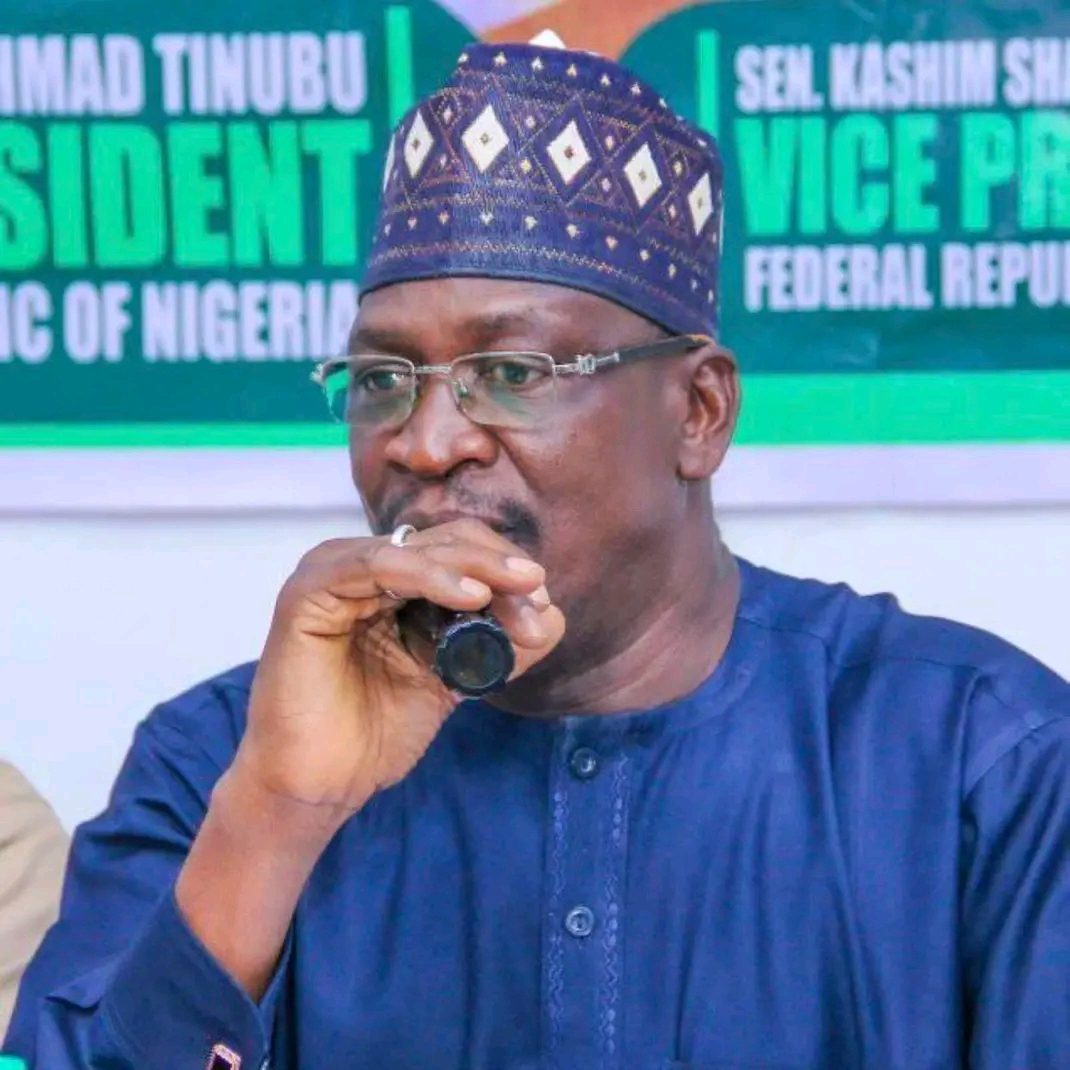

Deputy Governor of Borno State
- In office 17 October 2015 – 29 May 2019
- Governor: Kashim Shettima
- Preceded by: Zannah Mustapha
- Succeeded by: Umar Usman Kadafur

Personal details
- Born: 02/02/1962 Hawul, Borno State, Nigeria
- Party: All Progressives Congress

Usman Mamman Durkwa is a Nigerian politician who served as the deputy governor of Borno State from 2015 to 2019.
