= Asiwaju Kayode Blessing =

Nigerian politician

Federal Representative
- Constituency: Idanre/Ifedore

Personal details
- Died: April 2020 (Age 88)
- Occupation: Politician

Asiwaju Kayode Blessing was a Nigerian politician who served as a member of the House of Representatives, representing the Idanre/Ifedore Federal Constituency during the Second Republic. He was also the chairman of the defunct Social Democratic Party (SDP) in the old Ondo State (comprising Ondo and Ekiti) in 1991. He died in April 2020 at the age of 88 following a brief illness.
