= Mohammed Arzika =

Nigerian politician

Federal Minister of Communications
- In office June 1999 – 12 June 2001
- Preceded by: Air Vice Marshal Canice Umenwaliri
- Succeeded by: Haliru Mohammed Bello

Personal details
- Born: 21 April 1943 Tambuwal, Sokoto State, Nigeria
- Died: 9 June 2015 (aged 72) Sokoto State
- Party: PDP
- Awards: Officer of the Order of the Federal Republic (OFR) 1979

Mohammed Arzika was appointed Nigerian Minister of Communications from June 1999 to June 2001 in the cabinet of President Olusegun Obasanjo. He died after a brief illness on 9 June 2015.

== Background ==
Mohammed Arzika was born in Tambuwal, Tambuwal Local Government Area of Sokoto State, Nigeria, on 21 April 1943 to Alhaji Usman Nabungudu and Hajiya Bilikisu. He attended Tambuwal Primary School from 1951 to 1953, Sokoto Middle School from 1953 to 1955 and Provincial Secondary School (Nagarta College) from 1955 to 1961. He also attended Barewa College from 1962 to 1963 and Ahmadu Bello University Zaria, Institute of Administration, where he earned a Bachelor of Arts degree in public administration from 1964 to 1967.

Arzika joined the Federal Civil Service in 1967 and served in various ministries and offices of the Federal Government. He was Assistant Secretary, Federal Ministry of Mines and Power 1967–1968, Assistant Secretary, Federal Civil Service Commission 1968–1969, Assistant Secretary Federal Ministry of Industry 1969–1971.

He moved to the NorthWestern State Civil Service in 1971 as Senior Assistant Secretary and returned to the Federal Civil Service in 1972. He was posted to the Nigeria Embassy to the United States, Washington D.C. as Recruitment Attache from 1972 to 1975.

In 1975, he was appointed Principal Private Secretary to the Head of State (General Murtala Muhammad) and became Principal Secretary to the Head of State (General Olusegun Obasanjo) from 1976 to 1979. Between 1979 and 1980, he was Secretary for External Finance, Federal Ministry of Finance and became General Manager, Sokoto-Rima River Basin Development Authority in 1980. He retired from the Civil Service in this position in 1984 to enter private business and later joined politics.

He formed an agricultural business MAZ Agricultural Enterprises Ltd in 1984 which was focused on agriculture and MAZ Global Ventures Ltd which focused on commodity trading.

Other positions he held included Member, Board of Directors, Sokoto Investment Company ltd 1985–1987, President, Sokoto State Chamber of Commerce, Industry, Mines and Agriculture 1986–1989, Councillor for Agriculture and Natural Resources, Yabo Local Government Area Council 1986–1989, Chairman, Governing Council, Federal Polytechnic, Kaura Namoda 1986–1989, Organising Secretary, Council of Nigerian Farmers 1986-1989 and Member, Governing Council, Sokoto State University 2011 -2017.

Arzika was also a member of the Sokoto State Elders Committee and Turaki (Shehu Shagari) National Elders Committee.

== Political career ==
Arzika joined politics when he contested and won the election to represent Yabo/Tambuwal Federal Constituency in the Constituent Assembly 1988-1989 which was held to debate and agree the provisions of the Constitution for the return to civil rule in 1993 being mid wifed by the General Ibrahim Babangida Administration.

Arzika was the Chairman of the People's Solidarity Party (PSP), one of the political parties that applied for registration when General Ibrahim Babangida started preparing for a transition to democracy in 1991, later merging into the Social Democratic Party (SDP). Arzika contested for and lost the National Chairmanship of the Social Democratic Party to Ambassador Babgana Kingibe in June 1990. He was included in the Elders Committee of the SDP until it was scrapped by General Sani Abacha in November 1993.

After the failure of the Nigerian Third Republic with the assumption of power by General Sani Abacha, he became a member of the National Democratic Coalition (NADECO) formed in May 1994. Along with Balarabe Musa and few others in the North, they championed the cause of the return to power of the presumed winner of the 12 June 1993 elections Chief MKO Abiola until Abiola died in 1998.

In 1998, Arzika joined with a group of prominent politicians headed by Chief Solomon Lar known as G18 from Northern Nigeria to ask General Sani Abacha to resign from office and return Nigeria to civil rule. The group later expanded to include other prominent politicians from Southern Nigeria (G34) headed by former vice president Alex Ekwueme and continued with the agitation. With the sudden death of Abacha and Abiola, the new Head of State General Abdulsalami Abubakar announced that the Military will handover power to civilians in May 1999 and political activities resumed. The G34 then expanded to become a pan Nigeria group which became the Peoples Democratic Party (PDP). Arzika chose to remain in Sokoto to organize the party and was its first State Chairman. The Peoples Democratic Party (PDP) won presidential elections in 1999 and its candidate- Arzika's former boss General Olusegun Obasanjo returned to power.

== Minister of Communications ==
In June 1999 Arzika was appointed Minister of Communications in Obasanjo's first cabinet. He published a formal telecommunications policy in May 2000. Prior to the official policy release, Arzika said the changes would help Nigeria add two million fixed and 1.2 million mobile lines over the next two years. At the time, Nigeria had about 500,000 connected fixed and mobile phone lines for a population of over 108 million. The policy essentially remained in force for the next ten years.

The telecommunications environment at the time was dominated by the state-owned Nigerian Telecommunications (NITEL). Although Private Telecoms Operators (PTO) were allowed to provide service, typically using wireless links, the PTOs complained that NITEL denied them access to the network, or failed to provide sufficient access lines, and charged excessively for connections. Speaking in June 2000, the NITEL Managing Director Emmanuel Ojeba said that NITEL would address these problems, and planned to expand network capacity by about one million lines per year.

Arzika promised to provide telephone service in all the local government areas. At the opening session of the second Africa Internet Summit in September 2000, Arzika said the Nigerian government had identified access to telecommunications as a critical factor in the development of all aspects of the nation's economy. Arzika pushed to liberalize the telecommunications sector. In early 2001 the Nigerian Communications Commission (NCC) auctioned licenses for GSM mobile carriers. NITEL obtained a licence, and well as Econet and MTN. Arzika also made a strong case for expanding NITEL to transform it into a "viable, reliable and technologically sound company to enable it to meet the demands of government's deregulation and privatisation policies". In December 2000, Arzika said that plans to privatize NITEL had received a favorable reaction both within and outside the country.

In January 2001 President Obasanjo approved a merger of NITEL and the state-owned mobile carrier M-Tel, and confirmed the appointment of Emmanuel Ojeba as the Chief executive. Until then Ojeba had been in an acting capacity for almost a year. In March 2001, Arzika visited the People's Republic of China accompanied by Ojeba and met with his counterpart Mr Wu Jichuan, where they discussed approaches both countries were taking to ensure rapid telecoms growth. In April 2001 Arzika ordered the removal of Ojeba from his position as managing director of NITEL ahead of his scheduled retirement in June 2001 as part of the "process of reinvigorating the much-criticised national carrier".

Speaking in May 2001 in response to allegations that NITEL had executed inflated contracts, a NITEL spokesman said Arzika "is the only minister ... that has not bothered to influence any decision in the company, so how then could anyone allege that he was in the know how?" In June 2001 Arzika resigned from the cabinet. He was replaced by Mohammed Bello.

== Later life ==
After his resignation from the Federal Cabinet, Arzika retired from politics and returned to his farming and commodities business in Sokoto. He remained an active member of the local community in Sokoto and Tambuwal. He was an active member in the Sokoto State Educational Development Foundation, Sokoto State University Governing Council and Tambuwal Educational Development Council. Arzika was instrumental to the establishment of Federal Government Girls College Tambuwal and Community School Tambuwal.

Arzika was an avid squash player, Chairman of the Sokoto State Squash Racket Association and cyclist until an injury forced his retirement from the game in 1999. Despite a spinal injury which affected a part of his leg, he was a committed swimmer. He read very widely and travelled all over the world. He maintained an active life until he developed heart problems in 2015 and died shortly afterward.

Arzika was married to Fatima (Inno) daughter of former President Shagari with whom he had six children; she died in 2007. He married Hadiza (Yar Mafara) and they had seven children; she died in the ADC plane crash of 2006. He was later married to Sadiya and Amina. He was survived by 12 children (one died in the ADC plane crash) and several grandchildren.

In 1979 he received the Officer of the Order of the Federal Republic (OFR) national award.
