= Lawal Haruna =

Nigerian politician

Lawal Ningi Haruna

Administrator of Borno State, Nigeria
- In office August 1998 – May 1999
- Preceded by: Victor Ozodinobi
- Succeeded by: Mala Kachalla

Personal details
- Born: 1 October 1957 (age 68)

Military service
- Allegiance: Nigeria
- Branch: Nigerian Air Force
- Rank: Wing Commander

Wing Commander (retired) Lawal Ningi Haruna was military governor of Borno State, Nigeria from August 1998 to May 1999 during the transitional regime of General Abdulsalami Abubakar, handing over to the elected civilian governor Mala Kachalla in May 1999.

Group Captain Haruna was appointed administrator of Borno State in August 1998.

He had to deal with controversy over the question of teaching Christian Religious Knowledge in public schools, which was opposed by Muslim leaders in the predominantly Muslim state.

On 3 November 1998, he announced that separate Muslim and Christian instruction would start in schools with sufficient numbers of Christian pupils, as provided by the constitution. On 11 December riots followed a call from an Imam to attack Christians, with considerable loss of property but no deaths.

In June 1999, Haruna was required to retire, as were all other former military administrators.

In December 2000, Haruna alleged that Lt-General Jeremiah Useni had planned the killing of Head of State General Sani Abacha, who had died of obscure causes on 8 June 1998.
