= Mohammed Maina =

Nigerian politician and army officer

Governor of Borno State
- In office December 1989 – June 1990
- Preceded by: Abdul One Mohammed
- Succeeded by: Mohammed Buba Marwa

Lt. Colonel Mohammed Maina was governor of Borno State, Nigeria during the military administration of General Ibrahim Babangida.

Maina was a member of the Lagos Zone military tribunal set up in 1984 by the administration of General Muhammadu Buhari to try public officers from the Shehu Shagari era who had been accused of embezzling public funds. Appointed Borno State governor in 1990, he lived lavishly and had no patience with accounting procedures, making withdrawals from state funds through "brief notes to accounting authorities at the Treasury. In March 1990 he entertained the Prince and Princess of Wales on a visit to the state.
