= S. K. E. Udeh-Okoye =

Nigerian politician

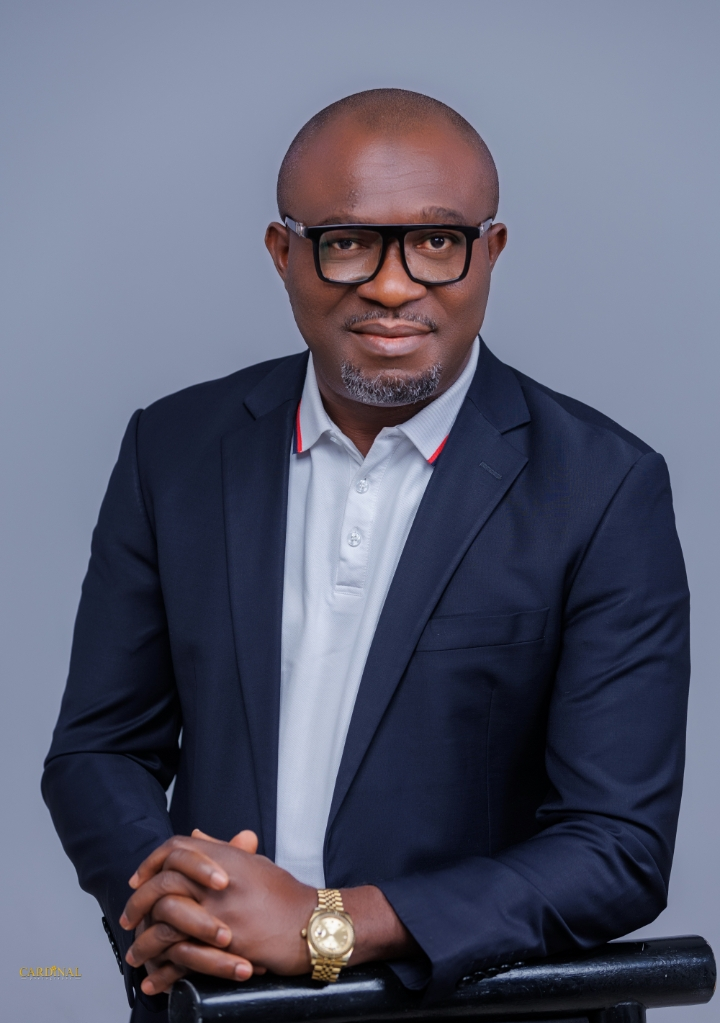
S. K. E. Udeh-Okoye

Sunday Kelly Enemchukwu Udeh-Okoye (born 28 May 1978) is a Nigerian agriculturist, businessman, and politician. He was the former National Youth Leader of the PDP National Working Committee, from December 2017 to December 2021.

Udeh-Okoye was a legislator in the Enugu State House of Assembly from 2011 to 2017 when he contested and won the position of Peoples Democratic Party National Youth Leader. He was the Majority Leader of Enugu State House of Assembly from 2011 to 2015 before being reelected to the House in 2015 for a second tenure where he served as Chairman, House Committee on Works, Lands, and Housing and Urban Development.

Currently, RT. Hon. Udeh-Okoye is the National Secretary of the Peoples Democratic Party (PDP), after the Appeal Court of Nigeria sacked Senator Nnaemeka Anyanwu “SamDaddy” as the National Secretary of the PDP and affirming his replacement with Udeh-Okoye.

== Political career ==
Udeh-Okoye was born in Agbogugu village in Enugu State. In 2006, Udeh-Okoye was the Chairman of the Enugu State Youth Coalition. Three years later, in 2009, Udeh-Okoye contested and won the National President's slot of the Southeast youth movement.

In 2011, at the age of 33, Udeh-Okoye was elected to represent his constituency in the Enugu State House of Assembly. Being an articulate assemblyman, his colleagues in the House of Assembly, not minding that he was a first-time legislator, elected him to be the majority leader of the House.

Udeh-Okoye was reelected into the Enugu State House of Assembly in 2015 for a second term, which he served until his election by PDP national delegates to become the party’s National Youth Leader in December 2017. During his second term as a state legislator, he was made the Chairman, House Committee on Works, Lands, Housing, and Urban Development.

Rt. Hon. S.K.E. Udeh-Okoye is the immediate past National Youth Leader of the Peoples Democratic Party (PDP) following his success at the December 2017 National Convention. As an agriculturist, Udeh-Okoye established the second-largest farm in Enugu to help the advancement of agriculture in Southeastern Nigeria. As the PDP youth leader, Udeh-Okoye led a delegation of party faithful in 2018 to petition Diplomatic Missions in Abuja like the US Embassy, UK Consulate, French Embassy, and the German Embassy Nigeria over fears regarding the conduct of credible elections in the country in 2019.

On 2 September 2019, the special adviser to the PDP National Youth Leader in Media and Publicity, Okah Ewah Edede, released a statement that Udeh-Okoye has been kidnapped by unknown gunmen. No one knew if his abduction was politically motivated, but he was later released by the kidnappers.

Currently, Rt. Hon. S. K. E. Udeh-Okoye is the National Secretary of the Peoples Democratic Party (PDP), following the judgement of the Appeal Court of Nigeria which sacked Senator Anyanwu from the office of the National Secretary of PDP and affirming his replacement with Udeh-Okoye.

== See also ==
• PDP National Working Committee
