= 2011 Borno State gubernatorial election =

State election in Nigeria

- 26 April 2011
Nominee	Kashim Shettima	Mohammed Goni
Party	ANPP	PDP
Popular vote	531,147	450,140
Governor before election
Ali Modu Sheriff
ANPP
Elected Governor
Kashim Shettima
ANPP

The 2011 Borno State gubernatorial election was the seventh gubernatorial election of Borno State. Held on 26 April 2011, the All Nigeria Peoples Party nominee Kashim Shettima won the election, defeating Mohammed Goni of the People's Democratic Party.

== Results ==
A total of 12 candidates contested in the election. Kashim Shettima from the All Nigeria Peoples Party won the election, defeating Mohammed Goni from the People's Democratic Party. Registered voters was 2,236,159, valid votes was 1,050,796, votes cast was 1,113,117, 62,321 votes was cancelled.

2011 Borno State gubernatorial election
Party	Candidate	Votes	%	±%
ANPP	Kashim Shettima	531,147		
PDP	Mohammed Goni	450,140		
ANPP hold				
