= Ahmadu Giade =

Nigerian police officer

Executive Chairman of the National Drug Law Enforcement Agency
- In office 24 November 2005 – 22 November 2015
- Preceded by: Bello Lafiaji
- Succeeded by: Muhammad Mustapha Abdallah

Special Assistant to the President on Narcotic Drugs and Psychotropic Substances
- In office December 2015 – April 2019

Personal details
- Born: Giade, Bauchi State
- Occupation: Civil servant

Ahmadu Giade, a retired deputy commissioner of police, was appointed chairman of the Nigerian National Drug Law Enforcement Agency (NDLEA) in November 2005. He replaced Bello Lafiaji, who was dismissed by President Obasanjo due to allegations of corruption. Giade has also served as Special Assistant on Narcotic Drugs and Psychotropic Substances to the president of Nigeria, Muhammadu Buhari.

== Early life ==
Giade was born in Giade, Bauchi State.

== Career ==
Giade began his security career in 1963 when he enlisted into the Nigeria Police College Kaduna. He had series of local and international training programmes such as Anti Fraud Course, Lagos 1968, and Prosecution Course Kaduna 1969. In 1989 and 1993, he distinguished himself at both the Intermediate and Senior Command training programmes at the Police Staff College, Jos. In 1997, he participated in the International Police Organisation (INTERPOL) Conference Lyon, France on Advanced Fee Fraud as well as the Fifteenth International Symposium on Economic Crime, Jesus College Cambridge. The following year, he was also in Lyon France for International Police Organisation (INTERPOL) Conference on Forgery of National Currencies. He was appointed Aide-De-Camp (ADC) to Senator Joseph Wayas, Senate President of the Federal Republic of Nigeria in 1982. Giade's rising profile also saw him holding among other positions the Divisional Police Officer (DPO) in Tin Can Island Port and Isokoko Police Station Lagos. He served as an Assistant Commissioner of Police Criminal Investigation Department (CID) Rivers State Command in 1989. In 1993, he held a similar position at the Katsina State Police Command before his transfer to the Special Fraud Unit, Force Criminal Investigation Department Lagos. Giade was a member, Federal Government Task Force on the Reorganization of the National Drug Law Enforcement Agency (NDLEA) in 1994. In 1999, he retired from the Nigeria Police Force as a Deputy Commissioner of Police (DCP). In November, 2005 he was appointed the Chairman/Chief Executive of the NDLEA and completed his second tenure in November 2015. He was appointed Special Assistant to the President on Narcotic Drugs and Psychotropic Substances from December, 2015 until April 2019 where he completed his tenure and retired from public service.

== NDLEA Chairman ==
Speaking in October 2008 before a United Nations committee discussing crime prevention, criminal justice and international drug control, Giade said that one of the most significant problems faced in Nigeria was the misuse of cannabis. Nigeria needed the help of the international community to fully tackle the situation.

He has described drug barons as agents of death who always work towards a failed state wherever they are allowed to operate.

In November 2015, Giade formally handed over the Agency to its Director General, Roli Bode George, at a ceremony in the Ikoyi Headquarters in Lagos. At the ceremony, he said "I am leaving the agency better than I met it 10 years ago. My greatest legacy is my zero tolerance for corruption. If we must continue to dislodge drug barons and eradicate drugs from our society, we must remain forthright and committed to drug control programmes. I am leaving behind a legacy of proactive and intelligence-led organisation."

"The agency under my watch has a representative at INTERPOL headquarters and has successfully raised the international profile of the country through unprecedented seizures of drugs and arrest of drug barons.”

== Achievements in NDLEA ==
The achievements of the agency during his time in office includes the removal of Nigeria from the drug majors list by the United States government and the removal of Nigeria from the major drug list opened door to a robust cooperation and partnership with stakeholders.

The agency won legal suits for the conviction of 8,637 drug offenders in five years from the year 2010 to 2015. In 2010, the NDLEA won 1,509 convictions, in 2011, 1,491 while in 2012, the number of persons convicted rose to 1,718.

The convictions further increased to 1,865 in 2013 and 2,054 in 2014. This brings the total number of drug offenders sentenced to various jail terms within that period to 8,637.

Giade has broadened the frontiers of drug control with unprecedented arrests, seizures and convictions. Some of his unique selling points include zero tolerance for corruption, discipline and hard-work.

As at 2021, Giade remains the longest serving Chairman of the NDLEA since its establishment in 1989, having served 10 years from November 24, 2005 to November 22, 2015.
