= Ibrahim Dada =

Military Governor of Borno State, Nigeria

Military Governor of Borno State
- In office 9 December 1993 – 22 August 1996
- Preceded by: Maina Maaji Lawan
- Succeeded by: Victor Ozodinobi

Military service
- Allegiance: Nigeria
- Branch: Nigerian Air Force
- Rank: Air Commodore

Air Commodore (retired) Ibrahim Dada was Administrator of Borno State, Nigeria from December 1993 to August 1996, during the military administration of General Sani Abacha. He was a Group Captain when he was appointed as the governor.

He made his priority the completion of all viable projects that his predecessors had started before considering any new projects.

In June 1999, he was required to retire by President Olesegun Obasanjo, as were all other former military administrators.

In June 2009, President Umaru Yar'Adua appointed Dada to the board of the Nigeria Institute for Oil Palm Research.
