= Mohammed Buba Marwa =

Nigerian military general and politician (born 1953)

Brigadier General Mohammed Buba Marwa CON

Chairman of NDLEA
- Incumbent
- Assumed office January 2021
- Preceded by: Muhd. Mustapha Abdallah

Governor of Lagos State
- In office August 1996 – May 1999
- Preceded by: Olagunsoye Oyinlola
- Succeeded by: Bola Ahmed Tinubu

Governor of Borno State
- In office June 1990 – January 1992
- Preceded by: Mohammed Maina
- Succeeded by: Maina Maaji Lawan

Personal details
- Born: 9 September 1953 (age 73) Kaduna, Northern Region, British Nigeria (now Kaduna State, Nigeria)
- Party: All Progressives Congress
- Spouse: Munirat Marwa
- Education: Nigerian Defence Academy

Military service
- Allegiance: Nigeria
- Branch: Nigerian Army
- Rank: Brigadier General

Mohammed Buba Marwa CON (born 9 September 1953), is a retired Nigerian army brigadier general, who is serving as the Chairman of the National Drug Law Enforcement Agency (NDLEA) since January 2021. He previously served as governor of Lagos State from 1996 to 1999 during the military regime of General Sani Abacha and Abdulsalami Abubakar and governor of Borno State from 1990 to 1992 during the military regime of General Ibrahim Babangida.

== Early life and education ==
Marwa was born on 9 September 1953 in Kaduna, Northern Nigeria to a military family; his father, Buba Marwa, and grandfather was Fulani, Buba Yola, had served in the Nigeria Army. He had his primary school education across Nigeria in Enugu, Zaria, Abeokuta and Lagos (1960–1965) and went on to attend the Nigerian Military School (NMS), Zaria (1966–1970). Subsequently, he completed a regular combatant course at the Nigerian Defence Academy (NDA) and was commissioned into Nigeria Army Recce Corps (NARC) in June 1973.

== Military career ==
He was commissioned as 2nd lieutenant in the Nigerian Army Reconnaissance Corps before moving to the Armoured Corp. He held various posts in the army, including Brigade Major (23 Armoured Brigade), Aide-de-Camp (ADC) to Chief of Army Staff, Lieutenant-General Theophilus Danjuma, academic registrar of the Nigerian Defense Academy and deputy defense adviser in the Nigerian Embassy in Washington, DC. In 1990, he was appointed Governor of Borno State. In 1992, he became the defense adviser to the Nigerian Permanent Mission to the United Nations.

== Academic qualifications ==
General Marwa has two postgraduate degrees, Master of Public and International Affairs from the University of Pittsburgh (1983–85) and Master of Public Administration from Harvard (1985–86).

== Public administration ==
He has held several command and staff appointments in the Nigeria Army, including Deputy Defense Adviser at the Nigerian Embassy in Washington DC.

He was Military Governor of old Borno State (present Borno and Yobe states) from June 1990 to 1992. Marwa created the first Ministry of Water Resources and by direct labour, the state undertook the construction of roads and completed the Maiduguri International Hotel.

The appointment of Gen Marwa as the administrator of Borno State coincided with the time Idriss Deby, erstwhile rebel, seized power from President Hisen Habre, thereby dislodging members of the Chadian Army, some of whom went rogue and carried out raids across the border into Borno State. The marauders' pillaging of towns, villages and communities, was not unlike Boko Haram's.

In 1992, Gen Marwa was posted as Registrar of the Nigerian Defence Academy. And in 1993, he returned to foreign service as Defence Attache at the Mission of Nigeria to the United Nations in New York.

In August 1996, he was appointed Military Administrator of Lagos State. His three-year tenure in the state was accompanied by strategic programmes. The feats were achieved on a strict budget of N14billion. Marwa, who did not borrow from any bank throughout his tenure, handed over a cash amount of N2billion―the highest amount handed over from one state administration to another.

His leadership earned him "Nigeria's Man of the Year 1997" by Newswatch, Nigeria's oldest and influential weekly magazine.

== Lagos State Governor ==
From 1996 to 1999 Marwa was Military Governor of Lagos State. During his administration, he implemented programs such as "Operation 250 Roads" which greatly improved motoring conditions. He revamped public health institutions, and ensured that free malaria treatment that was available to all. His administration upgraded infrastructure in poor neighborhoods. He proclaimed an edict to regulate rents, stopping the "Jankara" method of eviction of tenants and ensuring that due process was followed. Marwa became well respected in Lagos because of "Operation Sweep", a joint police and military venture that helped reduce Lagos' notorious crime rate.

In February 1998, Buba Marwa said on Nigerian state radio and television that unknown persons were again trying to assassinate him, and that he and his entourage had been the target of several bomb attacks starting in 1996. He said that he would not be intimidated.

In May 1998, Mohammed Buba Marwa imposed fuel rationing in Lagos State in an attempt to tackle petrol shortages and reduce chronic queuing at petrol stations. In July 1998, Marwa opened a new asphalt plant in Lagos, the largest in Nigeria.

== Awards and honours ==
National Honour 2003―Officer of the Order of the Federal Republic (OFR)

2022―Commander of the Order of the Niger (CON)

Nigerian Armed Forces Honour 1998―Distinguished Service Star (DSS)

Academic Awards

1. Doctor of Humane Letters in Infrastructure, Security and National Development(Honoris Causa) Lagos State University, Ojo
2. Doctor of Science (Honoris Causa), Abubakar Tafawa Balewa University, Bauchi
3. Doctor of Public Administration (Honoris Causa), University of Nigeria, Nsukka (UNN)
4. Doctor of Management Technology (Honoris Causa) Federal University of Technology, Owerri
5. 2003 Outstanding Leadership Award by the Centre For Multicultural Leadership University of Kansas, Lawrence. First African honoured by the Institute in its ten years of inaugurating the award. Reciprocating, General Marwa endowed an annual “Marwa Africana Lecture Series” in the Department of African and Afro-American Studies. The late Prof Ali Mazrui presented the inaugural lecture.
