= PDP National Working Committee =

Eexecutive of People's Democratic Party

- Formation: 1998
- Location: Abuja, Nigeria
- Key people: Hon. AbdulRahman Mohammed, National Chairman; Senator Samuel Anyanwu, National Secretary; Prof. Adenike Ogunshe mni, National Woman Leader. Hon. Umar Bature National Organising Secretary. Hon. Jungudo Mohammed National Publicity Secretay. Barr. Kamaldeen Ajibade SAN, National Legal Adviser.
- Parent organization: People's Democratic Party
- Website: National Working Committee

The PDP National Working Committee, also known by its acronym NWC, is the National executive committee of the People's Democratic Party in Nigeria. The NWC is composed of 12 members, all of whom are elected to a four-year term at the party's National Convention. The NWC is headed by the chairperson, who also functions as the party's national chair. The NWC has the responsibility for the day-to-day governance of the party as well as oversight of its national activities.

== Current NWC leadership ==
The following is a list of those who comprise the 2021 National Working Committee:

- National Chairman (suspended): Iyorchia Ayu
- Acting National Chairman : Umar Iliya Damagum
- Deputy National Chairman (South): Taofeek Arapaja
- National Secretary: Samuel Anyanwu (Affirmed by Inec and Confirmed by PDP governors Forum and Party leadership)
- National Treasurer: Ahmed Yayari Mohammed
- National Organizing Secretary: Umar Bature
- National Financial: Daniel Woyegikuro
- National Woman Leader: Mrs Amina Darasimi
- National Youth Leader: Muhammed Kadade Suleiman
- National Legal Adviser: Kamaldeen Adeyemi Ajibade
- National Publicity Secretary: Debo Ologunagba
- National Auditor: Okechukwu Obiechina Daniel
- Deputy National Secretary: Setonji Koshoedo
- Deputy National Treasurer: Ndubisi Eneh David

== NWC chairpersons ==
The following is a list of chairs of the National Working Committee:

- Alex Ekwueme
- Solomon Lar
- Barnabas Andyar Gemade
- Audu Ogbeh
- Ahmadu Ali
- Vincent Eze Ogbulafor
- Okwesilieze Nwodo
- Haliru Mohammed Bello (Acting)
- Kawu Baraje (Acting)
- Bamanga Tukur
- Adamu Mu'azu
- Uche Secondus (Acting)
- Ali Modu Sheriff
- Ahmed Makarfi (Acting)
- Uche Secondus
- Iyorchia Ayu

== See also ==
- PDP Board of Trustees
- PDP Governors Forum
- 2016 PDP National Convention
