= Umar Usman Kadafur =

Nigerian politician (born 1976)

His Excellency Umar Usman Kadafur

Deputy Governor of Borno State
- Incumbent
- Assumed office 29 May 2019
- Governor: Babagana Zulum
- Preceded by: Usman Mamman Durkwa

Acting Governor of Borno
- In office 29 April 2021 – 19 May 2021
- Preceded by: Babagana Zulum
- Succeeded by: Babagana Zulum

Personal details
- Born: Umar Usman Kadafur; 31 May 1976 (age 50) Biu, Borno State, Nigeria
- Party: All Progressives Congress (APC)
- Education: University of Maiduguri
- Occupation: Politician
- Profession: Public Administrator

Umar Usman Kadafur (born 31 May 1976) is a Nigerian politician who has served as deputy governor of Borno State since May 2019.

Kadafur had his early education at Mbulamel Primary School, Biu. He thereafter proceeded to Government Science Secondary School Monguno to obtain his secondary school leaving certificate. Much later, he furthered his studies at the University of Maiduguri, where he studied public administration.

== Acting Governor ==
On 26 April 2021, Governor Babagana Umara Zulum, wrote to the Borno State House of Assembly requesting approval to appoint Kadafur as acting governor from 29 April to 19 May 2021. The members of the state assembly accepted this request.
