= Abdulmumini Aminu =

Nigerian military officer and politician (born 1949)

Colonel Abdulmumini Aminu

President West Africa Football Union
- In office 1999–2003

Chairman of Nigeria Football Association
- In office 1996–1999
- Preceded by: Emeka Omeruah
- Succeeded by: Kojo Williams

Military Governor of Borno State
- In office August 1985 – August 1988
- Preceded by: Abubakar Waziri
- Succeeded by: Abdul One Mohammed

Personal details
- Born: 1949 (age 76–77) Katsina, Northern Region, British Nigeria (now in Katsina State, Nigeria)

Military service
- Allegiance: Nigeria
- Branch/service: Nigerian Army
- Rank: Colonel

Abdulmumini Aminu (born 1949) is a retired Nigerian army colonel, he was military governor of Borno State between August 1985 and August 1988 during the military regime of General Ibrahim Babangida.

In May 2024, President Bola Ahmed Tinubu appointed Colonel Abdulmumini Aminu (Rtd) as the Pro-Chancellor and Chairman of the Governing Council of the Federal University Dutsin-Ma (FUDMA) in Katsina State. Under his leadership, the council held its inaugural retreat in December 2024 to familiarize members with university governance. That same month, the council approved the appointment of Dr. Musa Ajiya as the new Registrar of FUDMA.

He later became chairman of the Nigeria Football Association, and then chairman of the West Africa Football Union.

== Birth and education ==
Abdulmumini Aminu was born September 17th, 1949 in Katsina (city), Katsina State. He attended Kankiya Primary School from 1957-1962, then Government Secondary School, Funtua from 1963-1967. After joining the military, he graduated from the Nigerian Defence Academy Short Service Course in 1969, and Nigerian Army School of Infantry in 1972.

== Military career ==
Aminu was one of the officers who arrested General Muhammadu Buhari in the August 1985 coup in which General Ibrahim Babangida came to power. At the time, Aminu was Military Assistant to Babangida, who was Chief of Army Staff. Aminu was a Major in his mid-thirties when Babangida appointed him governor of Borno State later that month. At Nigeria's first national AIDS conference in October 1987, Aminu said the theory that AIDS originated in Africa is a stalking horse for anti-black racism, due to a mentality that attributes everything that is bad and negative to the so-called "dark continent." As Borno Governor, Aminu was challenged by lack of funds, and initially by resistance to his authority as an outsider. He made education his priority.

After his term as governor, Aminu became an instructor at the Armed Forces Command and Staff College, Jaji. He was then appointed deputy military secretary, then brigade commander and then was acting general officer commander in Jos. He was then appointed commander of the National Guard, responsible for improving national security. Aminu retired when General Sani Abacha came to power.

== Football ==
Aminu was chairman of the Nigeria Football Association (NFA) in 1997. In the France '98 World Cup competition, he ordered bonus payments of $8,000 each to the Nigerian players, despite losing to Paraguay in the last group match of the competition. In April 1999, as NFA chairman, Aminu was head of Nigeria's local organizing committee, preparing to host World Cup players in Liberty Stadium, Ibadan during the 1999 FIFA World Youth Championship tournament. In July 2004, Aminu was a vice-chairman of a 17-man committee set up to re-organise the Nigeria Football Association.

He was in competition with air commodore Emeka Omeruah to be selected as the next president of the West Africa Football Union (WAFU) in 1999. In November 1998, the government expressed its support for Omeruah. In March 1999, the head of Ghana Football Association gave his tacit support to Aminu's bid, provided he showed clear interest in the job. Aminu became president of the West Africa Football Union from 1999 to 2002, and a member of the Confederation of African Football. He set his goal to reinvigorate the almost moribund organization.

== Politics ==
Aminu joined the People's Democratic Party (PDP) at the start of the Nigerian Fourth Republic. He later switched to the United Nigeria People's Party (UNPP). Aminu ran for governor of Katsina State in April 2003, but lost out to the incumbent Umaru Musa Yar'Adua, who later went on to become President of Nigeria.

In April 2004, Aminu rejoined the PDP, saying that the UNPP was in disarray. In June 2007, Aminu joined the race to succeed Bala Bawa Ka'oje as the chairman of the National Sports Commission. The job in fact was given to Abdulrahman Hassan Gimba.
