= Central executive committee =

A central executive committee is a governing body with executive power in parties, governments, or private organizations. The term may refer to one of the following:

== General ==
- Central Executive Committee (PAP), the highest ruling committee within Singapore's People's Action Party (PAP)
- Central Executive Committee (Philippines), an insurgent revolutionary government established by Francisco Macabulos in 1898
- Central Executive Committee of the Pakistan Peoples Party

== Former Soviet Union ==
- Central Executive Committee of the Soviet Union (1922–1938)
- All-Russian Central Executive Committee (1917–1937)
- All-Ukrainian Central Executive Committee (1917–1938)
- All-Byelorussian Central Executive Committee (1920–1938)
- All-Caucasian Central Executive Committee (1922–1936)
- Litbel Central Executive Committee (1919–1920)
- Centrosibir, name for the Central Executive Committee of Soviets of Siberia (1917)
- Rumcherod, name for the Central Executive Committee of Soviets of Romanian Front, Black See Fleet, and Odessa Oblast (1917–1918)
- Central Executive Committee of the Navy (June–November 1917)

== See also ==
- Executive Committee (disambiguation)
- National Executive Committee (disambiguation)
- Category:Executive committees of political parties
- Committee § Executive committee
- Central committee
- Politburo
