= Ibrahim Imam =

Nigerian politician

Honourable Ibrahim Imam
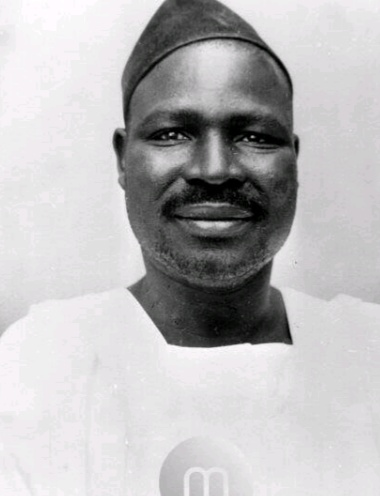
- Nigerian Government

Member of the Northern House of Assembly
- In office 1961–1965
- Succeeded by: position abolished
- Constituency: Jemgbar

Member of the Northern House of Assembly
- In office 1956–1960
- Succeeded by: Maina Idrisa
- Constituency: Yerwa South

Personal details
- Born: 1916 Yerwa
- Died: April 1980 (aged 63–64) London
- Party: Borno Youth Movement
- Spouse(s): Fusam Umaram, Hajiya Dije & Hajiya ashe
- Children: Kashim Ibrahim-Imam
- Occupation: Contractor

Ibrahim Imam (1916 – April 1980) was a Nigerian politician from Borno, who was the secretary of the Northern People's Congress and later became a patron of the Borno Youth Movement. He was elected into the Northern House of Assembly in 1961, representing a Tiv district. Prior to his election in 1961, he had represented his district of Yerwa in 1951 after supporting a strike of Native Administration workers.

== Early life and education ==
In 1916, Imam was born into an aristocratic Kanuri family from the Yerwa district of Borno. He attended Katsina College, and after completing his studies joined the Borno Native Administration as an assistant.

Three of Imam's half-brothers were councillors of the Shehu of Borno, one as the District Head of Yerwa, one as a Legal Adviser to the Shehu's court, and one as another District Head. Despite his aristocratic background, he distanced himself from it, generally avoiding the aristocracy of Borno. In 1950, he bolstered a strike organised by workers of the Native Authority. This strike led to the removal of the Supervisor of Works. He was then replaced by Imam, largely due to pressure from the strikers to appoint him.

== Political career ==
While working as an engineering assistant for the Borno Native Authority, he entered the political arena as the founder of the Borno Youth Improvement Association (BYIA) in 1949. In 1951, he contested and won a seat to the Northern House of Assembly defeating the Waziri Mohammed. Because of his new commitments, he did not contribute much time to the BYIA, leading to its dissolution in January 1951.

A year later at the inception of the Northern People's Congress, which later became the dominant party in the region, he was nominated as the party's secretary-general; he joined a large number of his colleagues from the regional house who enlisted on the political platform of the new Northern People's Congress (NPC). As the general secretary of NPC, he became one of the party's prominent campaigners and was involved in political tours, traveling for thousands of miles while providing support for the extension of the party through the establishment of branches in various towns and cities in the region.

Imam was known as a radical and a vocal critic of the Native Authority, however, after becoming a parliamentarian, he became a leading spokesman for the NPC, the most conservative party in the region, with a goal to preserve the system Imam previously heavily criticised. In March 1953, it was Imam who moved the famous motion of adjournment in the Federal House of Representatives which prevented debate on an Action Group resolution for self-government in 1956. According to political scientist Richard L. Sklar, he "assumed these postures of conservatism" largely because he hoped to retain and increase his influence within the party. However, he fell out with the party leadership, and resigned his office of General Secretary in 1954.

After leaving the Native Authority, he became a building contractor to supplement his income as an honourable member of the House.

=== Borno Youth Movement ===
In 1954, however, Imam resigned his position from NPC and left the party, citing the lack of a revolutionary platform for political reform of the local government in the north and also NPC's movement towards a reactionary and imperialistic political union. In 1954, the Bornu Youth Movement (BYM) was formed by a group of young Kanuri men. The group invited prominent Kanuri politicians, including Imam, to join their new party. Imam rejected the invite, but, according to the party, he donated money to the BYM.

==== 1956 regional elections ====
Before the 1956 regional elections, Imam, still an independent, sought the support of the BYM, who were now an influential party in Borno and were in alliance with the Northern Elements Progressive Union (NEPU). The BYM informed Imam that they would only support a member of the party in the elections, which led Imam to join them the following day.

The party nominated Imam to contest in the Yerwa North elections, but he demanded to stand for Yerwa South instead. This was likely because, not only did Yerwa South have a higher concentration of BYM supporters, but Shettima Kashim Ibrahim, Waziri of Borno and a Regional Minister, was contesting in the Yerwa North election for the NPC. Imam's demand was initially rejected, but was later accepted after insistence from NEPU. The initial BYM candidate for Yerwa South, Garba Kano, also refusing to contest in the Yerwa North election, dropped out entirely. The party then nominated one Mallam Basharu, a Native Authority driver, to contest in the election. Basharu later won the Yerwa North election, defeating Shettima Kashim.

In December 1957, Imam was convicted and sentenced to six months imprisonment for allegedly accepting a bribe four years earlier during his tenure as Supervisor of Works in the Native Authority. However, the Senior Resident of the Bornu Province found the conviction unjustified and it was ultimately quashed by a higher court.

In 1958, Imam negotiated an alliance between the BYM and the Action Group (AG), a party that dominated the Western Region. A split occurred within the party shortly after, as Imam failed to receive permission from the executive members of the party to begin negotiations with the AG. On 7 September 1958, a member of the NPC was killed during a 'scuffle' near the home of Imam. The following day, several members of the NPC reportedly attacked Imam's compound, leading to the death of 3 persons in Imam's house and 2 other members of the BYM in their homes.

He left NEPU and established an alliance with the Action Group and later became the leader of opposition in the regional House of Assembly.
