= Executive Committee =

An executive committee is a committee with executive powers.

Executive Committee may also refer to:

- Executive Committee (Oregon Country) a provisional government in what became the U.S. state of Oregon
- Executive Committee of the Communist International
- Executive Committee of the Privy Council of Northern Ireland, a government body in the United Kingdom 1922–1972
- Northern Ireland Executive, a government body in the United Kingdom
- Northern Ireland Executive (1973), under the Sunningdale Agreement
- Executive Committee Range, a mountain range in Antarctica
- EXCOMM, the Executive Committee of the National Security Council, Kennedy advisors during the 1962 Cuban Missile Crisis
- Politburo, or political bureau, the executive committee for communist parties
- Provisional Committee of the State Duma, which declared itself the governing body of the Russian Empire in March 1917

== See also ==
- Executive (government)
- Central Executive Committee (disambiguation)
- National Executive Committee (disambiguation)
- Category:Executive committees of political parties
- Central committee
