= Abdul One Mohammed =

Major General Abdul One Mohammed
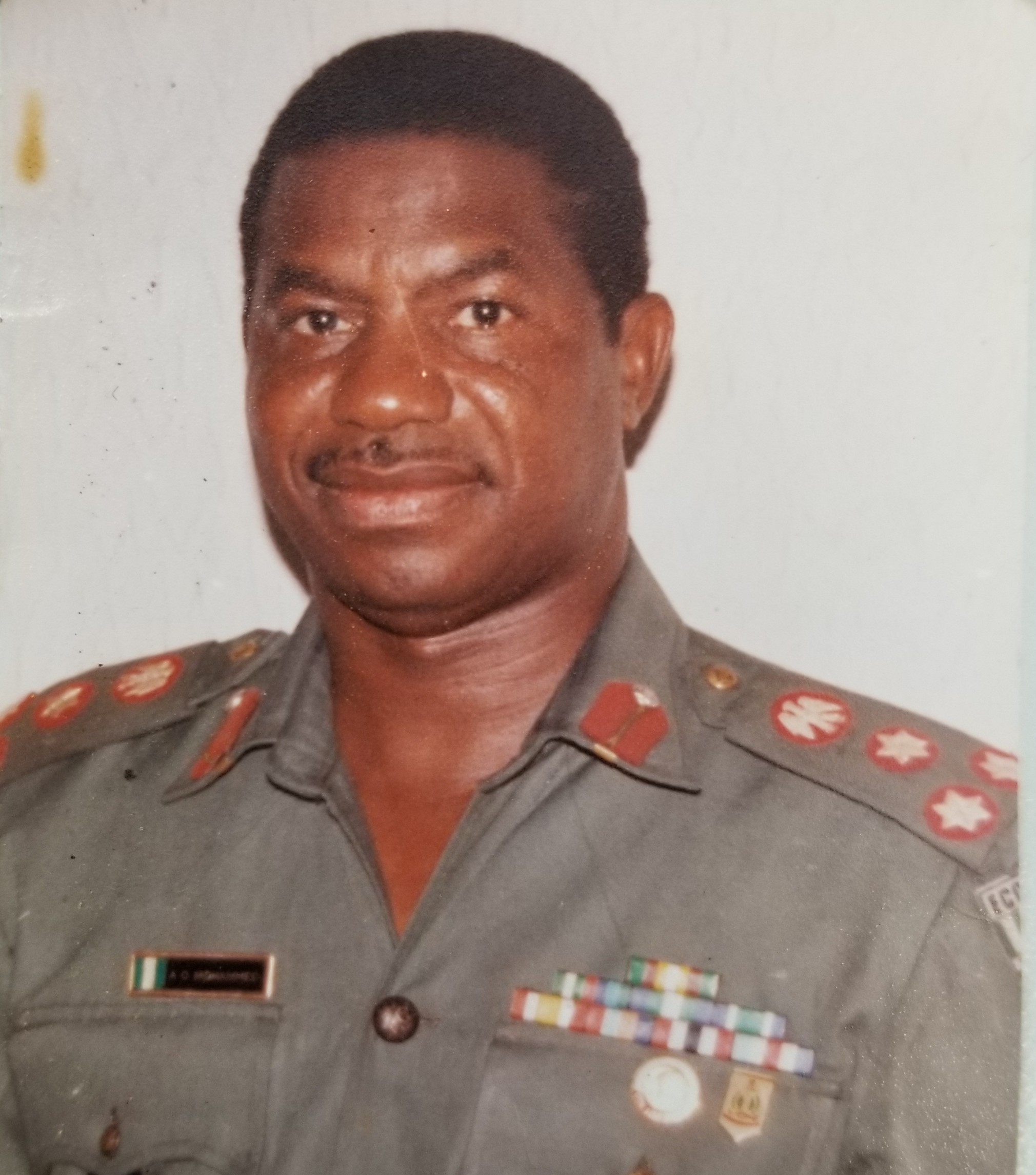

Governor of Borno State, Nigeria
- In office December 1987 – December 1989
- Preceded by: Abdulmumini Aminu
- Succeeded by: Mohammed Maina

Personal details
- Born: 25th February, 1945 Akuyam, Bauchi.
- Died: January 25th 2008 Plateau, Nigeria

Military service
- Allegiance: Nigeria
- Branch/service: Nigerian Army; ECOMOG
- Rank: Major General
- Battles/wars: Sierra Leone Civil War

Abdul One Mohammed (Note: "One" was inserted into Abdul Mohammed's name by the army to distinguish him from the many others by the same name (Abdullahi). "Abdul One Mohammed" is used in all official reports. Some sources incorrectly use the name "Abdul Wan Mohammed".) was military governor of Borno State, Nigeria, and later was leader of the ECOMOG peacekeeping force in Liberia and Sierra Leone.

General Ibrahim Babangida appointed Colonel Abdul One Mohammed military governor of Borno State from December 1987 to December 1989. In 1997 Abdul One Mohammed was posted to the Economic Community of West African States Monitoring Group (ECOMOG) as Deputy ECOMOG commander and Chief of Staff, heading operation in Liberia and Sierra Leone.

== Sierra Leone ==
In November 1997 Abdul Mohammed denied ECOMOG's fighter jets had violated a ceasefire agreement in an incident where fighters had intervened against ships trying the break the UN embargo against the junta in Sierra Leone. He said "Our aircraft were shot at so we returned fire". On 9 February 1998 the ECOMOG troops launched an all-out offensive to regain control of Freetown, capital of Sierra Leone. Abdul One Mohammed said his troops were near the Freetown city centre and would continue their advance.

On 24 February 1998 Abdul One Mohammed said that commercial and humanitarian cargoes could now enter the harbour of Freetown and that the airport was also open. The embargo on arms remained in force. He said he planned to soon deploy troops to gain better control of the hinterland and expected all roads in the Bo area to be reopened soon. On 25 February 1998 One Mohammed said his troops had moved in from Kenema and had taken over Bo from RUF rebels after heavy fighting. ECOMOG units held key positions in the city, backed up by Kamajor militiamen.

== Liberia ==
Liberians held a parade for ECOMOG peacekeepers in January 1998, who were due to leave the country on 2 February. Abdul One Mohammed called on Liberians to "put hands together and consolidate the peace we have put together". Earlier that month, he had expressed concern that trends could lead to renewal of conflict in Liberia, including the "re-enlistment of soldiers who have been identified with the seven-year fratricidal war.

In July 1998 Abdul One Mohammed said he regretted that Liberia's security forces were not retrained at the end of the civil war. He also said that ECOMOG had failed to establish a gun-free society in Liberia because "former warlords" had told their fighters to keep their weapons. In August 1998 he denied an accusation by Liberian President Charles Taylor that ECOMOG was planning to send more troops to destabilize the Liberian government. He said this was ridiculous since ECOMOG had been trying to restore peace since 1990, and Nigeria alone had spent millions of dollars for that purpose.

== Later events ==
Abdul One Mohammed was replaced as ECOMOG Chief of Staff in July 1998 by Brigadier-General G. Kwabe. During hearings of the Special Tribunal on Sierre Leone in 2004, a witness said that Hinga Norman, a former Sierra Leone People's Party (SLPP) Interior minister and Civil Defence Forces leader had said he received arms and ammunition from Abdul One Mohammed. In 2006 Abdul One Mohammed was unable to appear at the trial of Hinga Norman since he had been receiving medical attention in Germany and was too ill to travel to Freetown.
