= Borno Youth Movement =

Defunct political party in Nigeria

Borno Youth Movement (BYM) was a Nigerian political party founded on June 26, 1954. The party was founded by young radicals of Kanuri heritage who were indignant with the administrative course of native authorities in Borno and wanted to reform the authority.

The entry of Ibrahim Imam to the party led to an upswing in the fortunes of the party in Borno. Ibrahim Imam had earlier resigned his position as secretary-general of NPC and had joined NEPU. He merged NEPU activities in Borno with that of the youth movement. However, the alliance with NEPU encountered serious difficulties in 1958, after which BYM forged a new alliance with the Action Group.
