= Nana Shettima =

Second Lady of Nigeria since 2023

Second Lady of Nigeria
- Incumbent
- Assumed role 29 May 2023
- Vice President: Kashim Shettima
- First Lady: Oluremi Tinubu
- Preceded by: Oludolapo Osinbajo

First Lady of Borno State
- In office 29 May 2011 – 29 May 2019
- Governor: Kashim Shettima
- Preceded by: Halti Ali Modu Sheriff
- Succeeded by: Falmata Zulum

Personal details
- Born: Nana Usman Alkali; 22 July 1975 (age 51) Kano State, Nigeria
- Party: All Progressives Congress
- Spouse: Kashim Shettima (m. 1998)
- Children: 3
- Education: University of Maiduguri

Nana Kashim Shettima (born 22 July 1975) is the second lady of Nigeria since 2023, as the wife of Vice President Kashim Shettima. She was the first lady of Borno State from 2011 to 2019 when her husband was governor. She is the CEO of SWOT foundation and Model Orphanage Integrated School, Maiduguri.

== Background ==
Nana Usman Alkali was born in 1975 in Kano State to the family of Alhaji Usman Alkali who hails from Borno State and is a Kanuri by tribe. She married Kashim Shettima in 1998 and has three children. She is an alumnus of the University of Maiduguri, where she studied English Language and Literature.

Shettima, with the private support of her husband, carried out numerous humanitarian and social activities in support of orphans and widows. This led to the establishment of the Model Orphanage Integrated School in Maiduguri in 2018 to support orphans, widows, and bereaved families in Borno State.

During the insecurity that affected Borno State especially at the time of the Chibok school girls abduction in 2014, against security reports, Shettima travelled by road to Chibok to meet the parents of the abducted schoolgirls and offer support. That action caused her to miss a meeting with the First Lady, Dame Patience Jonathan, in Abuja.

She received The Sun Newspaper's "Most Supportive First Lady" award in 2016.

Through her Support for Widows, Orphans and Tsangaya Foundation (SWOT), Shettima has organized outreach activities for widows, orphans, and members of different religious communities in Borno State.

Shettima is an advocate for the fight against rape and drug abuse, imploring women to prioritize children's upbringing. She was also at the forefront canvassing votes for her spouse in the 2023 election.
