= Kashim Shettima =

Vice President of Nigeria since 2023

His Excellency Kashim Shettima GCON
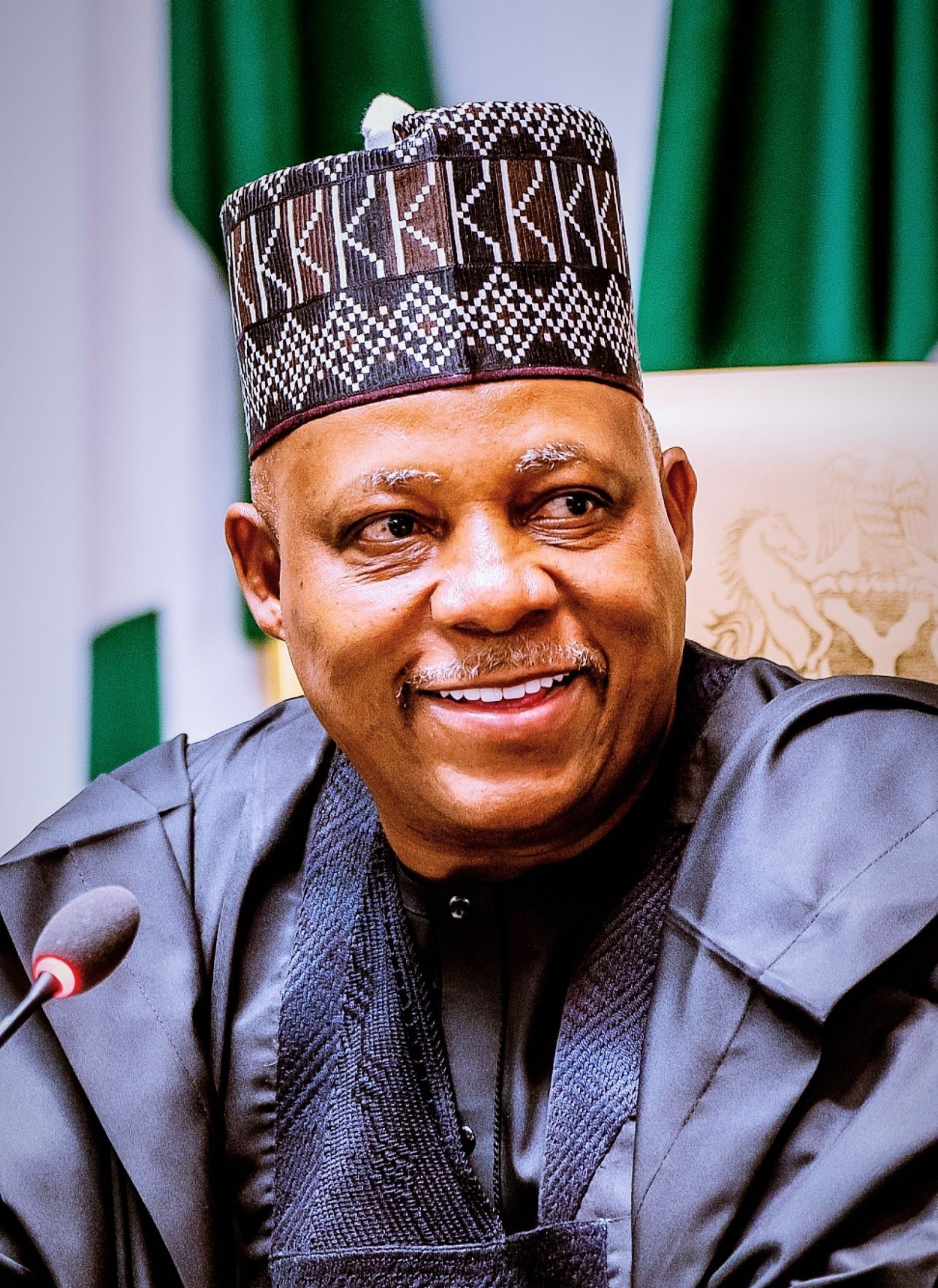
- Shettima in 2023

15th Vice President of Nigeria
- Incumbent
- Assumed office 29 May 2023
- President: Bola Tinubu
- Preceded by: Yemi Osinbajo

Senator for Borno Central
- In office 11 June 2019 – 29 May 2023
- Preceded by: Baba Kaka Bashir Garbai
- Succeeded by: Kaka Shehu Lawan

Governor of Borno State
- In office 29 May 2011 – 29 May 2019
- Deputy: Zannnah Mustapha (2011–2015); Usman Durkwa (2015–2019)
- Preceded by: Ali Modu Sheriff
- Succeeded by: Babagana Zulum

Personal details
- Born: Kashim Shettima Mustapha; 2 September 1966 (age 60) Maiduguri, Northern Region, Nigeria (now in Borno State)
- Party: APC (2013–present)
- Other political affiliations: ANPP (1999–2013)
- Spouse: Nana Usman Alkali (m. 1998)
- Children: 3
- Education: University of Maiduguri; University of Ibadan
- Occupation: Politician; banker
- Awards: List of honours and awards
- Website: Campaign website; State House website

Kashim Shettima Mustapha GCON (born 2 September 1966) is a Nigerian politician who is the 15th and current vice president of Nigeria. He previously served as senator for Borno Central from 2019 to 2023, and as the governor of Borno State from 2011 to 2019.

Born in Maiduguri in 1966, Shettima pursued higher education at the University of Maiduguri and the University of Ibadan. After completing his studies, he was in academia before joining banking, eventually ascending to hold several prominent executive positions within banks. By the mid-2000s, Shettima had become the manager of Zenith Bank's Maiduguri branch before resigning from his position to join the state cabinet of Governor Ali Modu Sheriff in 2007. After serving four years in the cabinet, he was elected governor in 2011 and re-elected by a significantly larger margin in 2015. His tenure as governor was characterized by the ongoing Boko Haram insurgency. Shettima left office in 2019 and subsequently became a senator.

== Early life and education ==
Kashim Shettima was born into a Muslim family of Shettima Mustafa Kuttayibe on 2 September 1966 in Maiduguri, Northern Region. His name Shettima means "wise one" in Kanuri. He is married to Nana Shettima, and they have three children.

Shettima attended Lamisula Primary School in Maiduguri from 1972 to 1978 and then went to the Government Secondary School, Biu in southern Borno State from 1978 to 1980. Eventually, he transferred to Government Science Secondary School, Potiskum (now in neighbouring Yobe State) where he completed his secondary education in 1983.

He studied at the University of Maiduguri and earned a Degree (BSc) in agricultural economics in 1989. He had his one-year compulsory membership of the National Youths Service Corps, or NYSC, at the defunct Nigerian Agricultural Cooperative Bank, Calabar, capital of Cross River State in South South, from 1989 to 1990. He then obtained a master's degree (MSc) in Agricultural Economics in 1991 at the University of Ibadan in Ibadan, South West.

After graduating, Shettima worked at the University of Maiduguri as a lecturer with the Department of Agricultural Economics from 1991 to 1993.

== Early career ==
Shettima held a position as an Agricultural Economist at the Commercial Bank of Africa's Ikeja Office in Lagos State from 1993 to 1997. Subsequently, he transitioned to a managerial role, ascending to the position of Deputy Manager and later Manager at the African International Bank Limited's Kaduna Branch from 1997 to 2001. In 2001, he was appointed Deputy Manager and Branch Head of the Zenith Bank's Maiduguri Office. Five years later, he assumed the role of North-East General Manager. In mid-2007, Shettima was appointed Commissioner of the Borno State Ministry of Finance and Economic Development. Subsequently, he served as Commissioner in the Ministries of Local Governments and Chieftaincy Affairs, Education, Agriculture, and later Health under his predecessor as Borno Governor, Ali Modu Sheriff.

== Governor of Borno (2011–2019) ==
In the January 2011 ANPP primaries, Engineer Modu Fannami Gubio was selected as candidate for the governorship. However, Gubio was later shot dead by gunmen, and Shettima was selected in a second primary in February 2011. In the 26 April 2011 elections, Shettima won with 531,147 votes while the Peoples Democratic Party (PDP) candidate, Muhammed Goni, gained 450,140 votes.

Kashim Shettima's tenure as Governor of Borno State (2011–2019) was marred by the Boko Haram insurgency, transforming his administration into a continuous exercise in crisis management. Inheriting a state already fractured by the 2009 uprising, Shettima's leadership was characterized by a "rebuild-as-they-destroy" philosophy. Shettima focused heavily on the Safe Schools Initiative and the construction of over 40 "mega schools" to house and educate the more than 50,000 children orphaned by the conflict.

During his initial term, the insurgency experienced a significant escalation, particularly with the Chibok schoolgirls kidnaping. This event garnered global attention to his state administration and the Nigerian federal government. Shettima emerged as a vocal and often contentious critic of the federal government's military strategy. Kabiru Sokoto, the alleged mastermind of the Christmas 2011 church bombing, who was twice arrested and escaped, was reportedly found sheltering at the official compound of the Borno state governor in Abuja. This raised questions over high-level government complicity with Boko Haram, including Sokoto's multiple controversial escapes from high security custody, and the Borno state governor, Kashim Shettima, apparently harbouring the suspected Boko Haram member at his official Abuja lodge. Notably, in 2014, he asserted that Boko Haram was "stronger than the Nigerian military", a statement that engendered a substantial rift with the Jonathan administration. However, some later regarded this as a necessary, albeit blunt, assessment of the security challenges facing the country. Despite the devastation caused by the insurgency, including the destruction of over 900 schools and the displacement of millions of people, Shettima leveraged his expertise in agricultural economics to advocate for the establishment of an Industrial Park in Maiduguri and the implementation of agricultural reforms. His objective was to provide economic alternatives to the radicalization of the youth.

Kashim Shettima's tenure was marked by a significant financial and physical endeavor to address the $5.9 billion in infrastructure damage inflicted upon Borno State by Boko Haram. Shettima's administration transcended mere repair to transform the state's educational landscape, particularly addressing the crisis of over 50,000 insurgency orphans, resulting in the construction of over forty "Mega Schools" designed to provide free education and nutrition to children who would otherwise be susceptible to radicalization. These initiatives were bolstered by the Safe Schools Initiative, a $20 million public-private partnership launched in response to the Chibok abduction to secure high-risk learning environments. Concurrently with these educational reforms, Shettima's government addressed the destruction of nearly one million private homes by initiating large-scale housing projects in devastated towns such as Bama and Gwoza.

To ensure the continuity of his recovery efforts, Kashim Shettima institutionalized his reconstruction efforts through a robust legal and administrative framework. He pioneered the creation of the Ministry of Reconstruction, Rehabilitation, and Resettlement (RRR), a dedicated body with a legal mandate to centralize the rebuilding of destroyed towns and manage the multi-billion dollar recovery budget. To protect his legacy in education, he signed the law establishing the Borno State University and implemented strict budgetary policies that ring-fenced funds for the maintenance of the Mega Schools, ensuring the state's 50,000 orphans would remain supported by future administrations. Furthermore, he facilitated the Borno State Agency for the Coordination of Sustainable Development and Humanitarian Response, a legislative tool that mandates all international NGOs to align their activities with the state's long-term strategic plan.

== Nigerian Senate (2019–2023) ==
Shettima joined the 9th Nigerian Senate as the Senator for Borno Central after he won the 2019 Nigerian senatorial elections to emerge as the federal senator for Borno Central Senatorial District, thereby replacing Senator Babakaka Bashir. During his time in the Senate, he sponsored critical legislation like the Criminal Code Act (Amendment) Bill and the Geospatial Information Regulation Bill, both aimed at modernizing Nigeria's legal and technological defenses against evolving security threats. Shettima argued that military force must be complemented by aggressive socio-economic development to effectively dismantle Boko Haram. Beyond his legislative responsibilities, Shettima emerged as a critical political mediator and "kingmaker," successfully overseeing a stable transition in Borno to his successor, Babagana Zulum, and later becoming a pivotal architect of the APC's Renewed Hope campaign. Shettima became a pivotal figure in the 2023 presidential race, he was one of the earliest and most vocal proponents of Bola Ahmed Tinubu's candidacy, famously arguing during the primary season that Tinubu possessed the "intellectual dexterity" and "pedigree" required to govern a complex nation. Following his victory in the primary election for the Senate in 2022, he withdrew from the nomination to become Tinubu's running mate, with Kaka-Shehu Lawan succeeding him at the Senate. Shettima's unwavering loyalty and strategic maneuvers within the Northern political bloc were instrumental in securing the APC ticket for Tinubu, leading to his own eventual selection as the Vice Presidential candidate and his resignation from the Senate in 2023 to assume the Nigeria's second-highest office.

== Vice Presidency (2023–present) ==
Seal of the vice-president.

On 1 March 2023, Bola Tinubu was declared as the winner of the 2023 Nigerian presidential election by the Independent National Electoral Commission (INEC). Thus, Shettima became the Vice President-elect of Nigeria.

Shettima assumed office after taking the oath of office on 29 May 2023 at the Eagle Square, Abuja. As the vice president of the Federal Republic of Nigeria, he is expected to oversee the economic planning team and report as well as make recommendations to the president who takes the final decision.

At the inaugural North West Peace & Security Summit held in Katsina on 24 June 2024, Shettima addressed the regional establishment, condemning an alleged plan by the Sokoto state government to depose the Sultan of Sokoto, Muhammadu Sa'adu Abubakar IV, who is a third-generation direct descendant of Qadiri mujaddid Uthman dan-Fodio. The Sokoto government later denied it was planning to effect the removal of the sultan.

On 24 September 2024, Shettima delivered a speech at the general debate of the seventy-ninth session of the United Nations General Assembly, deputising for Bola Tinubu. He endorsed the two-state solution to the Israeli-Palestinian conflict.

== Honours ==
- Nigeria:
  - Grand Commander of the Order of the Niger (GCON) (25 May 2023)

== See also ==
- List of governors of Borno State

Party political offices
Preceded by Ali Modu Sheriff	ANPP nominee for Governor of Borno State; 2011	Party dissolved
New political party	APC nominee for Governor of Borno State; 2015	Succeeded by Babagana Umara Zulum
Preceded by Yemi Osinbajo	APC nominee for Vice President of Nigeria; 2023	Most recent
Political offices
Preceded by Ali Modu Sheriff	Governor of Borno State; 2011–2019	Succeeded by Babagana Umara Zulum
Preceded by Yemi Osinbajo	Vice President of Nigeria; 2023–present	Incumbent
Senate of Nigeria
Preceded by Baba Kaka Bashir Garbai	Senator for Borno Central; 2019–2023	Succeeded by Kaka Shehu Lawan
