= Victor Ozodinobi =

Nigerian politician

Victor Afamefula Ozodinobi

Military Governor of Borno State
- In office 22 August 1996 – 1997
- Preceded by: Ibrahim Dada
- Succeeded by: Augustine Aniebo

Military service
- Allegiance: Nigeria
- Branch: Nigerian Army
- Rank: Colonel

Colonel Victor Afamefula Ozodinobi was appointed military governor of Borno State in August 1996 during the military regime of General Sani Abacha.

He stopped the practice of using troops to perform farm work, prevalent before his regime.

He was reportedly sacked from his position as governor and retired from the army because he insisted that scholarships should be reserved for the poor citizens of the state.

Another reason given is that during a fuel shortage he personally escorted some tanker loads of petrol to prevent them going astray.
