= Ali Modu Sheriff =

Nigerian politician (born 1956)

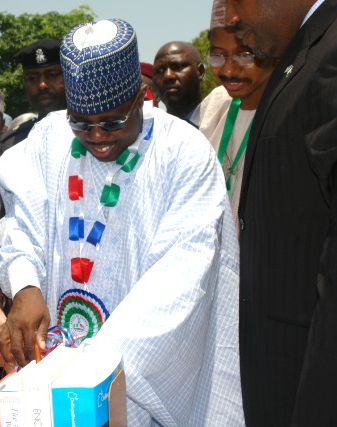
- Modu Sheriff in 2007

Chairman of the PDP National Working Committee Acting
- In office 16 February 2016 – 21 May 2016
- Preceded by: Uche Secondus (Acting)
- Succeeded by: Ahmed Makarfi (Caretaker)

Governor of Borno State
- In office 29 May 2003 – 29 May 2011
- Deputy: Adamu Dibal
- Preceded by: Mala Kachalla
- Succeeded by: Kashim Shettima

Senator for Borno Central
- In office 3 June 1999 – 3 June 2003
- Preceded by: Himself (1993)
- Succeeded by: Mohammed Abba Aji
- In office 5 December 1992 – 17 November 1993
- Succeeded by: Himself (1999)

Personal details
- Born: 1956 (age 69–70) Ngala, Northern Region, British Nigeria (now in Borno State, Nigeria)
- Party: All Progressive Congress (2013–2014; 2018–present)
- Other political affiliations: National Republican Convention (1992–1993); United Nigeria Congress Party (1997–1998); All Nigeria People's Party (1998–2013): Peoples Democratic Party (2014–2018)

Ali Modu Sheriff (born 1956) is a Nigerian politician who served as governor of Borno State from 2003 to 2011. He was the first governor to serve two consecutive terms.

Though Sheriff had held two elected offices as a member of All Nigeria People's Party, he would later join the All Progressives Congress becoming a founding member of that party. In 2014, Sheriff switched affiliation to the People's Democratic Party. He acted as the National Working Committee chair from 16 February 2016 until the National Convention, when he was removed and replaced by Ahmed Makarfi. On 26 April 2018, Sheriff defected back to All Progressives Congress.

== Background ==
Ali Modu Sheriff was born in Ngala Town, Ngala Local Government Area, Borno State in 1956. His father was the business tycoon Modu Sheriff, who was also the Galadima of the Borno Emirate. He attended Government Secondary School, Bama (1974–1979). He attended the London School of Business, where he studied Insurance, Banking and Finance. In 1981, he joined his father's construction company as a Director, later becoming Managing Director. In 1985, he registered his first company. His companies include Meroil Organisation and Union Chase.

He was elected as a senator from Borno during the Third Nigerian Republic under the banner of NRC, his opponent then was Kolo Kingibe, wife of the Social Democratic Party (SDP) chairman Babagana Kingibe. He was also a member of the Constitutional Conference and chaired the committee on states and local government.

== Senate career ==
Ali Modu Sheriff was elected Senator representing Borno Central on the platform of the National Republican Convention during the Third Republic; he was again elected on the platform of the United Nigeria Congress Party (UNCP) during General Sani Abacha's military regime. After Nigeria' return to democratic governance, in April 1999 he was again elected Senator, Borno Central on the platform of the All Nigeria Peoples Party (ANPP).

In 2011, Sheriff lost his bid for the senatorial seat for the central zone of the state under the All Nigeria Peoples Party (ANPP) to Alhaji Ahmed Zanna Khalifa of the Peoples Democratic Party (PDP).

== Governor of Borno State ==
In 2003, he ran for Governor of Borno State on the ANPP platform and won. He was re-elected in 2007 and sworn in on 29 May 2007. In both cases, he defeated the PDP candidate Kashim Ibrahim-Imam.,

== PDP National Working Committee ==
During 2014, Sheriff switch affiliation to the People's Democratic Party. On 16 February 2016, he became the chairman of PDP National Working Committee (acting), serving until his removal from office at the 2016 National Convention. He was replaced by Ahmed Makarfi as Caretaker Chairman.

== PDP crisis ==
The Court of Appeal sitting in Port Harcourt, Rivers State, on Friday 17 February 2017 declared former Borno State Governor, Ali Modu Sheriff as the authentic National Chairman of the People's Democratic Party (PDP). In July 2017, following the verdict from a five-man Supreme Court, Ali Modu Sheriff was removed as the PDP Chairman and Ahmed Mohammed Makarfi reinstated as the National Chairman of PDP.

== Controversy ==
Sheriff has been accused of being a sponsor to the Islamic sect Boko Haram by an Australian hostage negotiator, Stephen Davies.

The former Borno State Governor Senator Ali Modu Sherrif was cleared by the Nigerian sceret police (DSS) in the year 2014.

== See also ==
- List of governors of Borno State
