= National Executive Committee =

National Executive Committee (NEC) is the name of a leadership body in several organizations, mostly political parties:

- National Executive Committee of the African National Congress, in South Africa
- Australian Labor Party National Executive
- National Executive of the Bharatiya Janata Party, in India
- National Executive Committee of the Labour Party, in the United Kingdom
- National Executive Committee for Space-Based Positioning, Navigation and Timing (PNT), a United States Government organisation
- National Executive Committee of the American Legion, in the United States

== See also ==
- Central Executive Committee (disambiguation)
- Executive Committee (disambiguation)
- Category:Executive committees of political parties
- Committee § Executive committee
- Central committee
- Politburo
- Democratic National Committee, United States
- Republican National Committee, United States
