= Mala Kachalla =

Nigerian politician (1941–2007)

Governor of Borno State
- In office 29 May 1999 – 29 May 2003
- Deputy: Ali Abubakar
- Preceded by: Lawal Haruna
- Succeeded by: Ali Modu Sheriff

Personal details
- Born: November 1941
- Died: 18 April 2007 (aged 65)
- Party: All Nigeria People's Party (ANPP)

Mala Kachalla (November 1941 – 18 April 2007) was governor of Borno State in Nigeria from 29 May 1999 to 29 May 2003.

== Background ==
Mala Kachalla was born in 1941 in Maiduguri, the capital of Borno State.

== Borno Governor ==
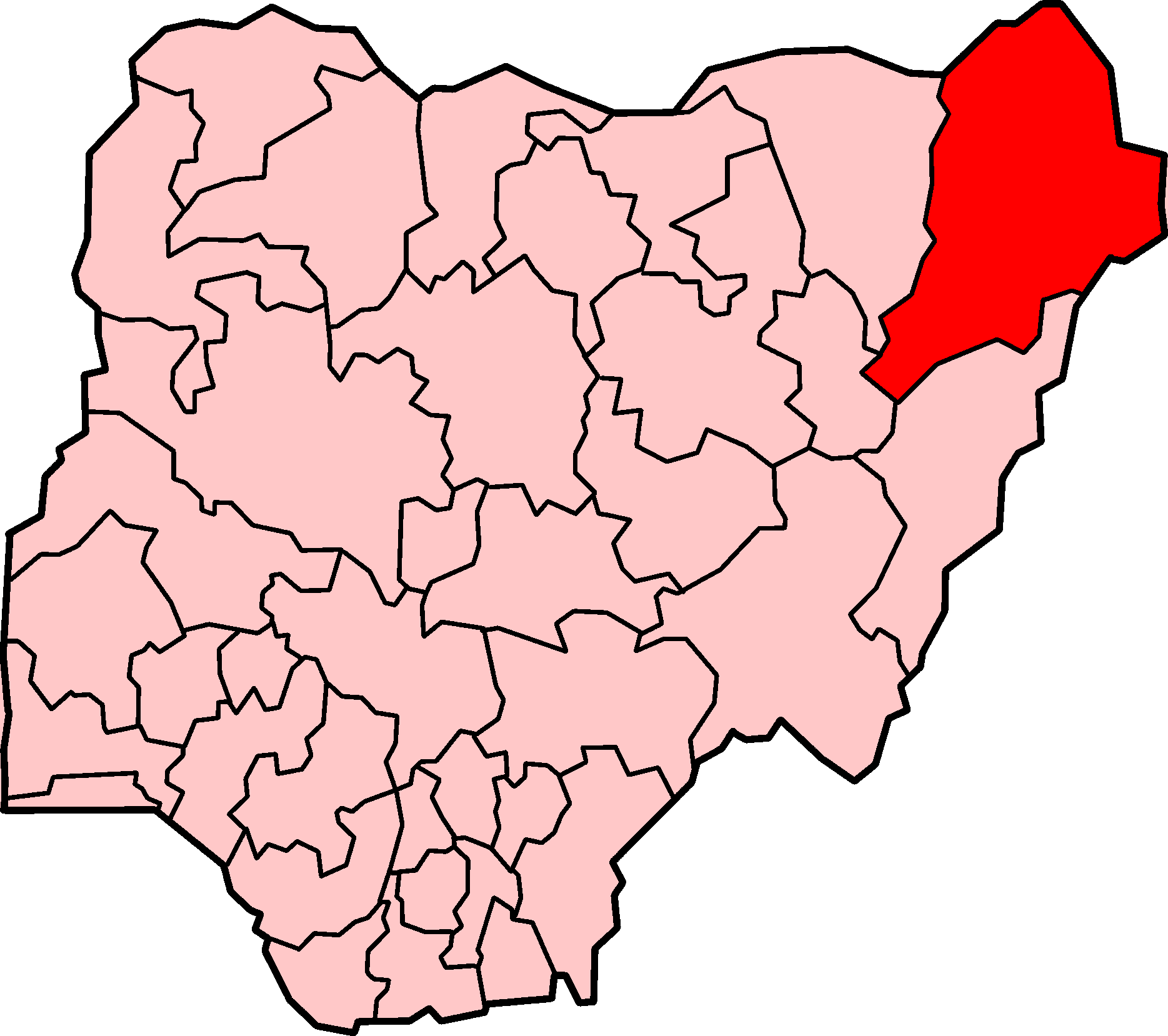
Location of Borno State in Nigeria

Mala Kachalla was elected as governor of Borno State in April 1999 during the 1999 Borno State gubernatorial election, running for the All People's Party (APP), which was renamed All Nigeria People's Party (ANPP) due to a factional split. His election was financed by Ali Modu Sheriff, who became Senator for Borno Central.

In August 2000, Borno State decided to adopt Sharia law. Mala Kachalla reassured Christians by emphasising that Sharia, which includes punishments like amputation and flogging, would only apply to Muslims. In February 2001, he established a Sharia Implementation Committee, which investigated the practical steps involved in introducing Sharia law in the state. After receiving the report, Mala Kachalla said the Sharia legal system would come into force in June 2001. Applying only to Muslims, the laws would ban gambling, alcohol and prostitution, among other vices.

In February 2002, riots broke out in Lagos between Hausa and Yoruba groups, during which houses were destroyed and over 100 people died, including women and children. Mala Kachalla met with the Lagos State governor Bola Tinubu and broadcast appeals to both sides to end the violence.

In September 2002 Mala Kachalla said there were conflicting border claims in the Lake Chad area, and that Nigeria was losing control of some island villages there. He said there was no clear cut demarcation between Borno, Chad and Cameroon, and that the region was plagued by armed rebels and trafficking in illicit arms and children.

In November 2001 police fired at workers in Maiduguri protesting against the withholding of their wages, a breach of a previous pay agreement. The Borno State Police Commissioner imposed a state of emergency. According to the Nigeria Labour Congress President in Borno State, when Mala Kachalla left office leave grant had not been paid for two years, health and hotel workers were on strike, shoe factory workers could not get their terminal benefits and even pensioners had outstanding arrears.

== Later career ==
Before the April 2003 elections, it became clear that Ali Modu Sheriff would be the ANPP candidate for governor rather than Kachalla. Kachalla left the ANPP and joined the Alliance for Democracy (AD). He was defeated by Ali Modu Sheriff. In February 2006, Kachalla changed parties again, joining the People's Democratic Party (PDP).

Kachalla died at his home in Maiduguri on 18 April 2007, after a brief illness. He was 66 years old.
