= Zannah Mustapha (politician) =

Nigerian politician (1966–2015)

Deputy Governor of Borno State
- In office 29 May 2011 – 15 August 2015
- Governor: Kashim Shettima
- Preceded by: Adamu Dibal
- Succeeded by: Usman Mamman Durkwa

Personal details
- Born: Zannah Umar Mustapha; 1966
- Died: 15 August 2015 (aged 48–49) Yola, Adamawa State, Nigeria
- Party: All Progressives Congress (2013–2015)
- Other political affiliations: All Nigeria Peoples Party (before 2013)

Zannah Umar Mustapha (1966 – 15 August 2015) was a Nigerian politician who served as deputy governor of Borno State from 2011 until his death in 2015.
