= List of governors of Borno State =

This is a list of administrators and governors of Borno State, Nigeria. Borno State was formed on 3 February 1976 when North-Eastern State was divided into Bauchi, Borno, and Gongola states.

Name	Title	Took office	Left office	Party	Notes
Musa Usman	Governor	28 May 1967	July 1975	Military	North-Eastern State
Muhammadu Buhari	Governor	July 1975	March 1976	Military	North-Eastern State
Group Captain Mustapha A. Amin	Governor	March 1976	July 1978	Military	First governor of Borno State
Tunde Idiagbon	Governor	July 1978	October 1979	Military	
Mohammed Goni	Governor	October 1979	October 1983	GNPP	Nigerian Second Republic
Asheik Jarma	Governor	1 October 1983	31 December 1983	NPN	Nigerian Second Republic
Abubakar Waziri	Governor	January 1984	August 1985	Military	
Abdulmumini Aminu	Governor	August 1985	December 1987	Military	
Abdul One Mohammed	Governor	December 1987	December 1989	Military	
Mohammed Maina	Governor	December 1989	June 1990	Military	
Mohammed Buba Marwa	Governor	June 1990	January 1992	Military	
Maina Maaji Lawan	Governor	January 1992	November 1993	SDP	Nigerian Third Republic
Ibrahim Dada	Administrator	9 December 1993	22 August 1996	Military	
Victor Ozodinobi	Administrator	22 August 1996	1997	Military	
Augustine Aniebo	Administrator	1997	August 1998	Military	
Lawal Haruna	Administrator	August 1998	May 1999	Military	
Mala Kachalla	Governor	29 May 1999	29 May 2003	APP	Nigerian Fourth Republic
Ali Modu Sheriff	Governor	29 May 2003	29 May 2011	ANPP	
Kashim Shettima	Governor	29 May 2011	29 May 2019	APC	
Babagana Umara Zulum	Governor	29 May 2019	Present	APC	

== See also ==
- States of Nigeria
- List of state governors of Nigeria
