= National Drug Law Enforcement Agency =

Law enforcement agency in Nigeria

- Flag of the National Drug Law Enforcement Agency
- Formation: 1989
- Headquarters: No 6 Portharcourt Crescent Area 11 Garki Abuja Nigeria
- Chairman/Chief Executive Officer: Mohammed Buba Marwa
- Website: ndlea.gov.ng

The National Drug Law Enforcement Agency (NDLEA) is a federal law enforcement agency in Nigeria under the Federal Ministry of Justice charged with eliminating the growing, processing, manufacturing, selling, exporting, and trafficking of hard drugs. The agency was established by Decree Number 48 of 1989. The NDLEA is present in international airports, seaports, and border crossings. The NDLEA also targets the leaders of narcotics and money laundering organizations.

== History and mandate ==
The NDLEA was established by the promulgation of decree no.48 of 29 December 1989, now an act of parliament whose major target was aimed at exterminating illicit drug trafficking and consumption.

== Drug cultivation ==
Former Chairman of the NDLEA, Ahmadu Giade, described illicit drugs as "alien" to Nigeria. Cannabis, locally grown in most states, was introduced to the country by foreigners. Oliver Stolpe, UNODC Country Representative to Nigeria, said that according to a new report by the United Nations Office on Drugs and Crime in 2021, 14.4 percent of Nigerians are presently engaged in drug abuse.

Also, Nigeria was one of the largest cannabis growers in Africa, with over 8% of the population using cannabis. Annual cannabis seizures increased from 126 metric tonnes in 2005 to 210 metric tonnes in 2007.

The NDLEA describes the southwest region of Nigeria as one of the main centers of illicit drug production in the country. 196.5 acres (0.795 km^{2}) of cannabis farmland was discovered and destroyed in the region in 2008. In particular, Edo State has the highest rate of seizure of cannabis in the country. In April 2009, the NDLEA confiscated 6.5 tonnes of marijuana from the home of a man in Ogun State who claimed to be 114 years old. In September 2009 the NDLEA reported destroying a 24 hectare cannabis plantation in a forest reserve in Osun State.

In January 2009, the NDLEA publicly burned 5,605.45 kilograms of drugs seized from traffickers in Badagry, Lagos. The bonfire included 376.45 kilograms of cocaine, 71.46 kilograms of heroin and 5,157.56 tonnes of cannabis.

== Drug trafficking ==
The United States donated full body scanning machines for the Lagos, Kano, Abuja and Port Harcourt international airports and provided security training and orientation airport officers. The machines have proved effective in catching smugglers and couriers taking cocaine from Latin America to Europe by way of Nigeria. Between 2006 and June 2008 over 12,663 suspected drug dealers were arrested, with seizure of over 418.8 metric tonnes of various hard drugs. For example, in July 2009 a woman about to board a KLM flight at the Mallam Aminu Kano International Airport was arrested by NDLEA officers and later excreted 42 wraps of cocaine, weighing 585 grams. In September 2009, the NDLEA arrested a Guinean woman en route from Brazil to Europe with 6.350 kg of pure cocaine at the Murtala Mohammed International Airport in Lagos.

In 2008 Nigeria was certified by the United States in the anti-narcotic crusade for the eight successive time. President George W. Bush said that Nigeria had made significant progress in counter narcotics and had effectively co-operated with the United States on drug-related and money laundering cases. In Katsina State, 100 people were convicted for drug offences from January to May 2008, and 358 people were arrested for drug offences in the same period.

== Drug barons ==
Speaking of efforts to go after the organizers of the trade, Ahmadu Giade said the agency had seized N270 million worth of shares from drug barons, as well as cars, houses and other property worth hundreds of millions of naira.

After a September 2009 meeting with the head of the Nigerian Immigration Service to discuss exchange of biometric data of convicted drug barons and traffickers, Giade said cooperation between the agencies would help deny passports to convicted drug barons.

== Controversy ==
The U.S. Department of State noted that there have been credible allegations of drug-related corruption at the NDLEA. In late November 2005 NDLEA Chairman Bello Lafiaji was dismissed by President Olusegun Obasanjo due to allegations of corruption and replaced by Ahmadu Giade. Lafiaji's continued anti-narcotic efforts made him a target of drug barons as was evidenced in their connivance with some third party to frame him in 2005.

Lafiaji was convicted on 21 June 2010, of conspiracy and conversion of 164,300 euros seized from a drug suspect in November 2005 when he was the Chairman of the NDLEA. He was sentenced to four years in prison together with his personal assistant. They were investigated by Nigeria's Independent and Corrupt Practices Commission. Lafiaji appealed his conviction and on 22 November 2011, a three-judge panel of Nigeria's Court of Appeal in Lagos unanimously overturned his conviction, holding that the prosecution failed to prove its cases beyond reasonable doubt. Lafiaji was therefore discharged and acquitted by the appellate court.

In June 2003 the National Committee for the Reform of the National Drug Law Enforcement Agency issued a report that identified a cartel of senior NDLEA members which had arranged the release of 197 convicted drug barons and couriers between 2005 and 2006, and recommended prosecution of these official.

== See also ==
- Opioid addiction in Nigeria
