= Maina Maaji Lawan =

Nigerian politician (born 1954)

Senator for Borno North
- In office 5 June 2007 – 6 June 2015
- Preceded by: Mohammed Daggash
- Succeeded by: Abubakar Kyari
- In office 3 June 1999 – 3 June 2003
- Preceded by: Hassan Abba Sadiq (1993)
- Succeeded by: Mohammed Daggash

Governor of Borno State
- In office January 1992 – November 1993
- Preceded by: Buba Marwa
- Succeeded by: Ibrahim Dada

Member of the House of Representatives of Nigeria
- In office 1 October 1979 – 31 December 1983
- Constituency: Kukawa North East

Personal details
- Born: 12 July 1954 (age 72) Kauwa, Northern Region, British Nigeria (now in Borno State, Nigeria)
- Party: All Nigeria Peoples Party (ANPP)
- Children: 7
- Education: Ahmadu Bello University
- Occupation: Politician; businessman; farmer

Maina Maaji Lawan (born 12 July 1954) is a Nigerian politician. He is a former governor and former senator for Borno State. A businessman, farmer and the CEO of Dansarki Farms.

== Background ==
Maina Ma’aji Lawan, CON, was born 12 July 1954 at Kauwa in Kukawa Local Government Area of Borno State, Nigeria. He finished his primary education at Kukawa in 1967 and proceeded to Government College Keffi for his secondary education between 1968 and 1972. In 1977, he graduated from Ahmadu Bello University, where he obtained a BSc degree in business administration, specializing in finance.

== Political career ==
While in active politics, he was a member of the Social Democratic Party (SDP), the Great Nigerian Peoples Party (GNPP), The Peoples Democratic Party (PDP), the All Nigerian Peoples Party (ANPP), and the All Progressives Congress (APC). He was elected into the House of Representatives at the age of twenty-four on the platform of the GNPP to represent Kukawa Southeast Federal constituency between 1979 and 1983.

In December 1991, Lawan was elected Governor of Borno State and served until 17 November 1993 when the third republic was aborted by a military coup. In the transition programmes that followed, Lawan was elected Senator for Borno North first in 1998 on the platform of UNCP under the Abacha Transition which was itself aborted and thereafter elected three times into the Senate from the same constituency, his last election being in 2011 after which he declined to contest.

During his sojourn in the Senate, Lawan was at various times the Deputy Senate Leader, Senate Minority leader, chairman Senate committees on special projects, National Population and Identity, Vice Chairman Senate committees on appropriation and Independent National Electoral Commission (INEC) as well as member of several standing and ad-hoc committees including but not limited to National Security and Intelligence, Constitutional Amendment, Finance, Petroleum, and Niger Delta Development Commission.

In 2011, Lawan was conferred with the National Honour of the “Commander of the Order of Niger” (CON) based on his various roles in national development.

== Business endeavour ==
Lawan established several businesses from the early 1980s to date.

He was the managing director of Madison Nigeria Limited (1982-1991), chairman and CEO of Comodex Ltd (1995 to date), Chairman CEO KBB Engineering Ltd 1999 to date and Chairman CEO of Dansarki Farms Ltd (2007 to date).
