= PDP Board of Trustees =

- Formation: 1998
- Purpose: Political
- Headquarters: Abuja, FCT
- Region served: Nigeria
- Members: 99
- Chairman: Adolphus Wabara
- Main organ: People's Democratic Party

The PDP Board of Trustees (BoT) is a constitutionally-mandated 99-member body within the People's Democratic Party of Nigeria that provides advice and counsel to the leadership of the National Working Committee and staff. It is regarded by the party's constitution as the conscience of the party.

The Board of Trustees is headed by an elected Chairperson, who is assisted by a Secretary. The current head of the BoT is former Senate President, Adolphus Wabara. as the substantive Chairman of the party’s Board of Trustees.

Wabara had been the interim PDP BoT Chairman since 2022 following the resignation of Walid Jibrin, who previously occupied the office.

The party also named a former governor of Kaduna State, Ahmed Makarfi, as the BoT Secretary, replacing a former Minister of Special Duties, Kabir Turaki.

== Composition ==
The composition of the BoT is set out in the People's Democratic Party constitution as:

1. All past and serving Presidents and Vice Presidents of the Federal Republic of Nigeria, who held or hold the respective posts as members of the party and who are still members of the party;
2. Past and serving National Chairmen, Deputy National Chairmen and National Secretaries of the party, who are still members of the party;
3. All past and serving Presidents of the Senate and Speakers of the House of Representatives who are still members of the party;
4. All founding fathers and founding mothers of the party;
5. Two women selected from each of the six geo-political zones;
6. Three members at least one of whom shall be a woman from each of the six geo-political zones;
7. Person(s) not exceeding six, who have contributed immensely to the growth of the party and found suitable by the Board;
8. Membership of the Board of Trustees shall reflect the federal character of Nigeria.

== List of BoT Chairs ==
- Alex Ekwueme
- Solomon Lar
- Tony Anenih
- Olusegun Obasanjo
- Goodluck Jonathan
- Walid Jibrin

Bode George
