= Social Democratic Party (Nigeria) =

- Chairperson: Sadiq Umar Abubakar Gombe
- Secretary: Olu Agunloye
- Founded: December 1989; 36 years ago
- Headquarters: No 17, Nairobi, wuse 2, Abuja, Nigeria
- Ideology: Social democracy
- Political position: Centre-left
- Seats in the Senate: 0 / 109
- Seats in the House of Representatives: 2 / 360
- Governorships: 0 / 36

The Social Democratic Party of Nigeria (SDP) is a centre-left political party in Nigeria. It was created on 3 November 1989 alongside the National Republican Convention by former military president Ibrahim Babangida, as part of a democracy project meant to form two national political parties – one slightly to the left and the other to the right. During the Nigerian Third Republic, it was seen as a moderate party attractive to young radical intellectuals and socialists. Its manifesto advocates for concerted efforts to improve welfare and fight for social justice.

== Structure ==
After 13 prospective parties were banned by the administration of Ibrahim Babangida in 1989, some of the associations decided to re-align. The People's Front of Nigeria, People's Solidarity Party, and the Nigerian Labour Party emerged to form the core constituency of the new SDP. The leadership was mostly dominated by Northern Nigerians. Babagana Kingibe was elected party chairman in 1990 over his rival Mohammed Arzika.

Despite the dominance of Northern Nigerians, the party's strength lay in the Igbo people in the states of Imo and Anambra. The party won 57% of Senate seats and 53% of House of Representatives seats in the 1992 National Assembly election. The party was primarily financed by the Nigerian government and wealthy individuals such as Shehu Musa Yar'Adua, Francis Nzeribe and M.K.O. Abiola.

In its first presidential primary, Yar'Adua garnered about 480,000 votes, dominating his primary opponent, Olu Falae in the first round. Those elections were then canceled by Babangida. In the second primary election under an adopted system called Option A4, another financier, Abiola (a former member of the National Council of Nigeria and the Cameroons and once a state chairman of the National Party of Nigeria), won the primary in March 1993. Abiola then contested the national election, which was also annulled by Babangida.

Former members include Atiku Abubakar, Jerry Gana, Abubakar Rimi, Rabiu Musa Kwankwaso, Shehu Yar'Adua, Abdullahi Aliyu Sumaila, Dapo Sarumi, Sule Lamido, Magaji Abdullahi, Tony Anenih, Lamidi Adedibu, Albert Legogie, Iyorchia Ayu, Fidelis Tapgun, Boss Mustapha, Bola Tinubu, Asiwaju Kayode Blessing and Mohammed Arzika. Later some of the members became senior figures in the People's Democratic Party (PDP). Jerry Gana returned to SDP in 2018.

Currently, SDP has over 83,378 registered members and has a presence in all the states of Nigeria.

== Manifesto ==
- Energy: The State supervises energy supply for industrial and social purposes.
- Rural Development: The State commits to reduce rural poverty and rural-urban migrations through support for community organizations and community development.
- Mining and Petrochemicals: The State shall ensure responsible and controlled exploitation of mineral resources.
- Labor, Employment, and Wages: Labor will be represented in all dealings with the affairs of working people.
- Education: Work towards free education programs at all levels.
- Defense: Encourage self-reliance, local production, and setting up local armament industries.
- Police: Change police attitudes to the state, perception of their obligations, and relations with the citizenry.
- SDP Revived

A new party emerged in the name of SDP. It was formed by a coalition of 13 parties. The revived party contested for posts in the 2015 Nigerian general elections except that the President conceded to People's Democratic Party candidate ex-president Goodluck Jonathan.

== 2023 Election ==
In the 2023 general election the SDP nominated Prince Adewole Adebayo as its presidential candidate.

== Ideology and revival in the 4th Republic ==
According to Chief Olu Falae, SDP was revived to address the failings of the two prominent Parties People's Democratic Party and All Progressive Congress, and to provide credible alternatives to Nigerians, as the SDP predates both the APC and PDP and has a history of winning elections.

== Platform ==
- Further the democratic ideas of the SDP.
- Become the third political platform and attract credible, competent, and dynamic leaders.
- Fight corruption and enthrone the rule of law.
- Gather patriotic and social democrats who will represent the people.
- Recreate an ideological party with structured deliverables.
- Form a national party.
- Open political space for young Nigerians.
- Reflect gender sensitivity and stand with people with disability.
- Unify the Nigerian people and give voice and action to their aspirations and desires.

== See also ==
- Nigerian Third Republic

== Notes ==
=== General References ===
- The PRS Group, Inc./Political Risk Services, Nigeria Country Report, SOCIAL DEMOCRATIC PARTY (SDP) 1 April 1993.
- Social Democratic Party Official Website (https://sdp.com.ng)
