= Yamta ra Walla =

Hero-founder of the Biu Kingdom (died c. 1580)

Yamta-ra-Walla

Ruler of Biu
- Reign: c. 1535 – c. 1580
- Successor: Mari Vira Hyel
- Born: Birni Gazargamu, Bornu
- Died: c. 1580 (Note: According to tradition, he did not actually die but "disappeared into the ground" (see Death section).); Limbur
- Issue: Mari Vira Hyel

Yamta-ra-Walla (died c. 1580), also known as Yamta the Great, was the founder of the Biu Kingdom in what is now northeastern Nigeria. Regarded in Biu and Babur tradition as a culture hero, he is credited with uniting the dispersed Bura and Babur settlements into a centralised kingdom. Several groups in the Biu–Marghi complex, including the Babur (Pabir), Marghi, Kamwe, and Kilba peoples, claim descent from him.

== Name ==
The original meaning of the name Yamta-ra-Walla is uncertain. Some link it to the Bura words ya (an honorific prefix) and mpta ('death'), and have suggested the sobriquet "one who deals out death to his enemies". A Kanuri mallam (Islamic scholar) told J G Davies, who compiled a history of Biu titled The Biu Book (1956) when he was a colonial officer there, that the name derived from the phrase yauman-taraku-wallah ("he will be leader of the people"). An alkali (chief Qadi) of Biu claimed that Yamta's real name was Abdullahi but that when he left Gazargamu in anger after failing to become mai (ruler) of Bornu, he cried out yauman-tarani-wallahi anasulden insha'allah ("one day you shall see that I am a chief, God willing"). By the 1960s, local Biu scholars had agreed that the original meaning was "you will soon see me or hear of me".

== Life ==
=== Early life ===
According to local tradition in Biu, Yamta was the son of a Mandara woman who was pregnant with him when she was taken to Mai Idris Katagarmabe, ruler of Bornu, in his capital Birni Gazargamu. Yamta was raised in the palace and considered a potential heir because of his proximity to the mai. However, when Mai Idris died in 1526, Yamta was not chosen because he was said to have been unable to kill the significant ox in the correct Muslim fashion. Unable to bear the shame, Yamta left Gazargamu for Mandara, accompanied by seventy-two men and their families. Yamta and about half of the party eventually settled in "the country of the Babur and the land of Gombe".

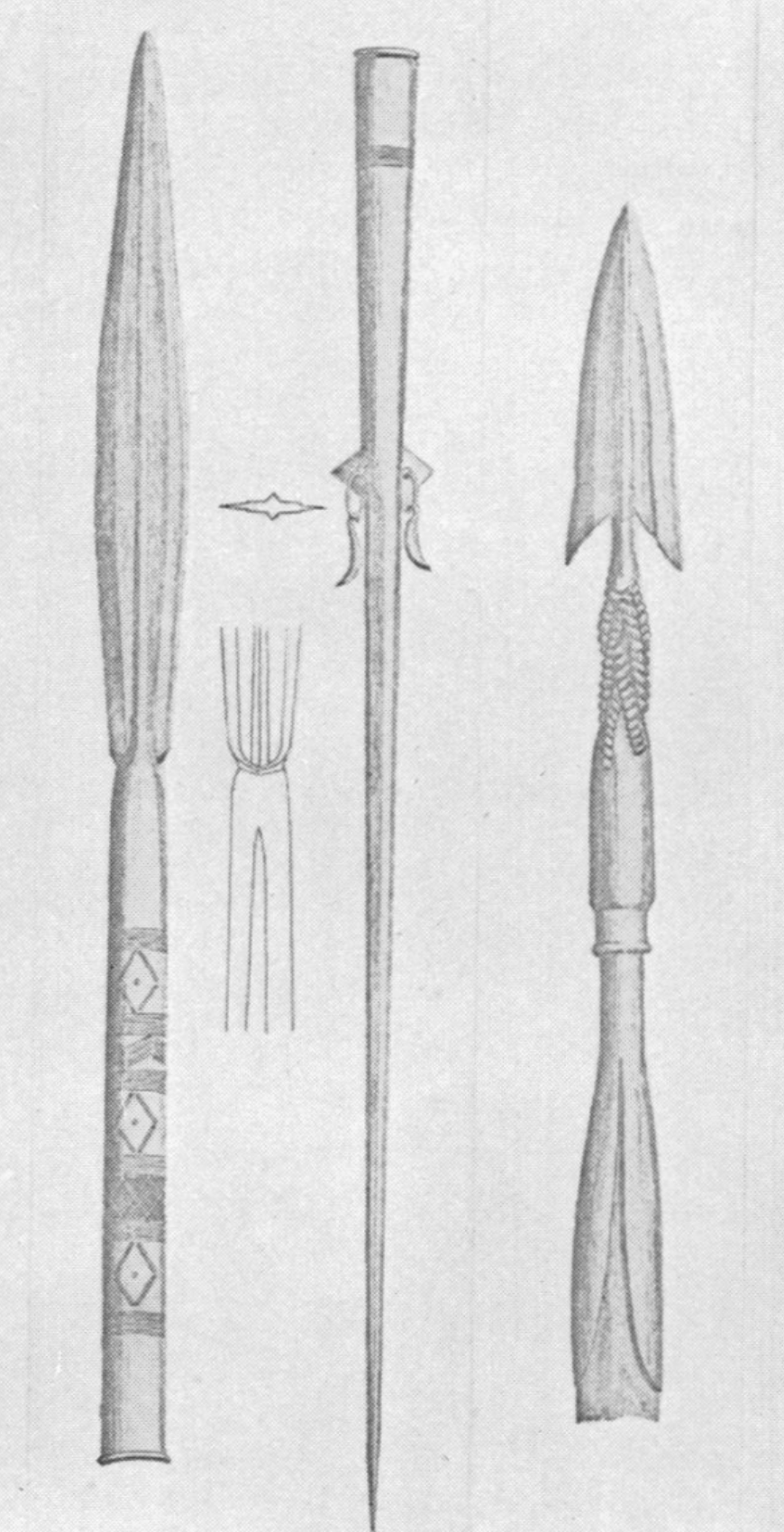
Sketch of two ceremonial Rum spears from the Emir of Biu's armoury Biu tradition holds that the male Rum spears were brought from Mandara by Yamta and used during his conquests. The female Rum (right) was said to have been the same one that miraculously resisted Yamta during his attack on Miringa.

Another tradition, recorded by J G Davies in The Biu Book (1956), asserts that Yamta's mother was Asga, an Arab from Egypt. She was sold to the son of the "Sultan of Auzum" and placed in the sultan's harem, where she became pregnant by the sultan. Later, she was found by three elephant hunters from Gazargamu, who "looked upon her as a great find for she was a very fair complexion and of such great beauty." They took her back to Bornu, and handed her over to Mai Idris, who placed her in his house, where she gave birth to a son named Muhammad "on the day when his hair was clipped" but his mother called him Yamta. Asga later said to her son: "Yamta Ula, I have seen a vision that you will leave Bornu and will go to Biu a country of pagans; verily if you do not obtain the rule of that country you will obtain the rule of the rest of the world..." Yamta left Bornu in anger after being passed over for succession, after he failed to properly slaughter a cow.

=== Ruler of Biu and Yamta's exploits ===
Yamta established a sizeable kingdom in the valley of the Gongola River, with his first capital at Limbur, located between Chikorkur and Mandaragirau. To consolidate his rule, he waged war against surrounding Bura polities including Miringa, Diwar, and Buratai. Many of Yamta’s exploits are recounted in embellished legendary accounts.

Unable to capture Kiwar directly, Yamta was said to have entered the town in disguise. He befriended a slave belonging to the Diwar chief's daughter, who introduced him to her mistress. When the town's inhabitants were asleep, the daughter showed Yamta her father's spear, which she said allowed her father to repel any attacking army. Some days later, while the townspeople were harvesting corn, Yamta returned to the chief's daughter. After getting her drunk, he killed her and stole the spear. Three days later, he returned to the town with the spear and an army. He declared to the people that, since he had the spear (the symbol of chieftainship) he was now their chief.

Another story relates how when Yamta set out to conquer Miringa, he was repulsed several times by a miraculous spear that arose from the ground. He secretly entered the town and seduced the chief's daughter, who gave him the spear. He later returned and conquered Miringa.

By the late 16th century, the Biu Kingdom had become a viable polity, though it was less stable than neighbouring Shani or Mandaragarau due to the nomadism of the Babur people. Reference to one "chief of Yamta" located south east of Bornu appears in Imam Ahmad ibn Fartua's biography of Mai Idris Alauma, written around 1583.

== Death ==
Yamta died around 1580. According to Biu legend, he did not die but "disappeared into the ground" after becoming annoyed with his son Mari who when tested by his father tried to prove that he could boil and eat a stone.

Mari succeeded his father as king but "was a weaker character". The kingdom soon began disintegrating, with the Bura reconquering their lands to within a few miles of Biu town.

== Legacy ==
Yamta's descendants are said to have spread across the Biu-Marghi complex, and people claiming descent from him can be found among the Kilba, Kamwe, Bazza and Marghi peoples. Yamta called his followers Babur, and the Babur (or Pabir) people are said to descend from intermarriage between Yamta's followers and the local Buram Sha.

From J G Davies's translation of Yamta's kirari (praise-song) collected in Biu:

He is like a lion, like a lion of the dark forest, yet has no mane; nothing can stand against him except for natural elements like shrubs and the wind.

His importance is such that he is like a pillar holding up the world; although small in size like a sack made from one squirrel's skin yet he controls a large territory as though that sack contained all the meat of one elephant.

Just as a deaf man may appear to be disobedient because of not hearing, so he is brave and fearless, for although he hears he behaves as though he doesn't, nothing dismaying him. He is independent of help from other people, like a baby locust which flies away when born not requiring any milk or assistance from its mother.
