= Mararaba Mubi =

Mararaba Mubi Kwarhi (Marghi Central)
- Town
- Location in Nigeria
- Coordinates: 10°16′N 13°16′E
- Country: Nigeria
- State: Adamawa State

Population
  - Ethnicities: Fulani; Margi; Kilba; Michika
  - Religions: Islam and Christianity

Mararaba Mubi is a small town in the Hildi district of the Hong local government area of Nigeria. It predominantly consists of the Margi Hildi tribe. It is about 15 kilometres from the town of Mubi. Its main economic activities are farming and petty trading.

== History and demographics ==
Mararaba is a name for the T-junction in the Hausa language widely spoken in the northern part of the country. Another name for the settlement is Kwarhi; kwarhi is a Hildi dialect word in the Margi language meaning pathway. It was coined by Arna Gaddo who was the first settler in Mararaba Mubi. He came from Hildi, his hometown, as a result of a misunderstanding with his tribe. When he arrived in Mararaba Mubi, there were no signs of settlement. The early settlers were from Hildi, about 8 km (5.0 mi) away. Among the first settlers were Ulea Nrvi, Jauro Abba, Ahamadu Liyarya and some Fulani and Kilba people including Jauro Ahmadu from Maki and Ahmadu Kila from Mubbula. Mubbula is one of several small Kilba villages and is several kilometers from the town of Hong. It was reported to have been ruled by Tul Hulma, a Cameroonian Nigerian resident who contributed greatly in clearing trees to make the road for the T-junction. Gaga and Jauro Ahmadu worked hard for the development of Mararaba Mubi Road. Ahmau Kila first settlement was in Uba; he was there for forty years before coming to Mararaba Mubi during the road construction.

Major tribes are the Margi and Kilba from Hildi and Maki as well as the Fali from Vimtim. Names like Nuhu Auwalu Wakili are very common in the state. The Nuhu Wakili family is the ruling family in the town. It is home to the state university, Adamawa State University.

== Geography ==
The recent developmental buildings in Mararaba Mubi include the Nigerian National Petroleum Corporation (NNPC) filling station, police station, central mosque, Barazza Hotel, and new private schools and hospitals.

The EYN Headquarters is located just opposite Baraza Hotel, Hildi Road.

Mararaba Youths Development Association (MYDA) is the strongest association in Mararaba Mubi; it was formed about thirty years ago. Although the names have changed due to recent development, the association have gained a cooperate affairs certificate under a new name MMYD which means Mararaba mubi youth's development association.

== Boko Haram ==
See also: Boko Haram

The jihadist group Boko Haram came to Mararaba Mubi on the morning of 29 October 2014. There were shootings and many fled. The group also captured the town of Mubi on the same day. Hunters and military troops helped to regain both cities from Boko Haram after many residents had been gone for over a month.
