= Marghi people =

Total population
- 360,000 (est.)

Languages
- Marghi language

Religion
- Christianity and Islam

Related ethnic groups
- Kanuri; Kibaku; Fali Kamwe People; Kilba; Pabir

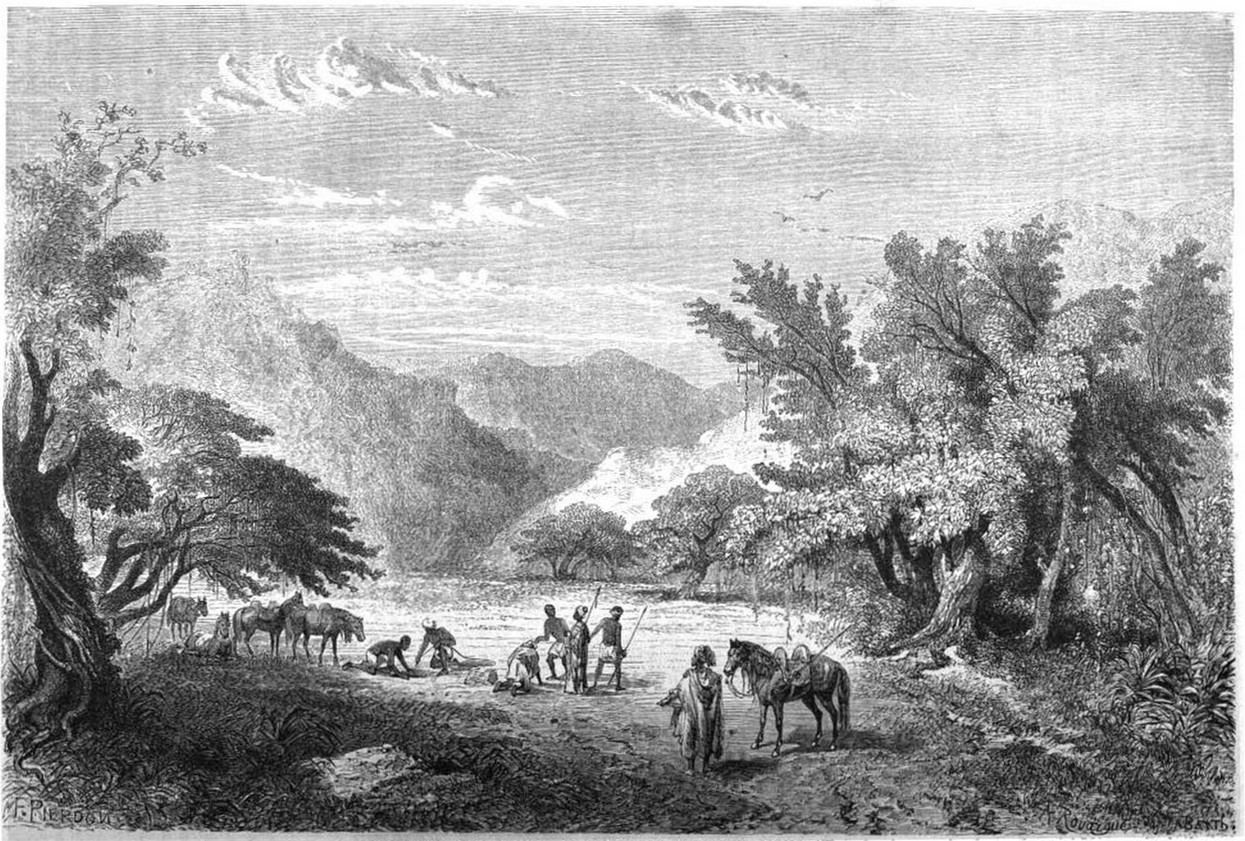
A forest in Marghiland

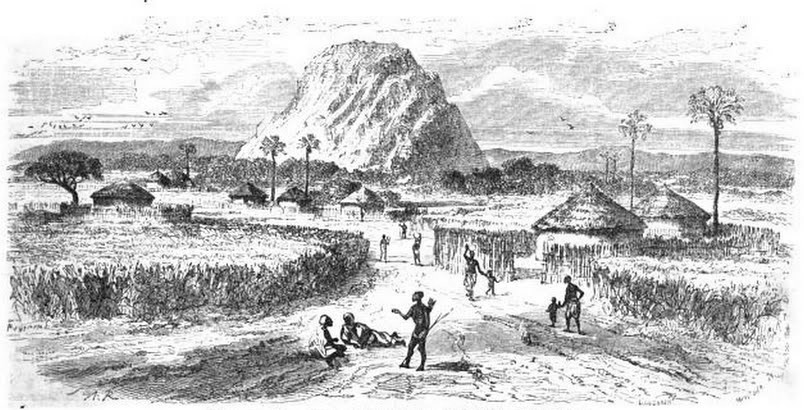
A Marghi village (1860)

The Marghi people (Margi) are an ethnic group in Nigeria, primarily residing in the states of Adamawa (Madagali, Mubi, Hong and Gombi) and Borno (Askira Uba, Damboa and Konduga). They have a population estimated at 360,000 and communicate using the Marghi language. Despite having their own language, the Marghi people are usually bilingual, sometimes even trilingual. In Borno, they speak Hausa, while in Adamawa, they speak Hausa and/or Fulfulde, both of which are dominant languages in their respective states.

== Origin ==
The Marghi people are believed to have migrated from the Mandara mountains and other highlands in northern Cameroon. Their migration was characterized by sporadic movements, as they immigrated in groups or clans (fal in Marghi). Many settled within the Bornu empire, while others migrated southwards into the Adamawa region. As a result of their settlement in diverse areas, the Marghi people were exposed to various cultural influences from neighboring ethnic groups, such as the Kamwe people, which they scornfully called higi in 1937 Kanuri, Kilba, and Pabir (Babur). The Margi, Kamwe, Bura and Chibok people are a branch of the Afro-Asiatic language found in Northern Nigeria and North Western Cameroon. The Margi, Kamwe, Bura and Kilba ethnic groups share many cultural similarities.

== Notable Marghi people ==
- Colonel Bzigu Afakirya –– Military Governor of Kogi State during the Abacha regime.
- Ahmadu Umaru Fintiri –– Governor of Adamawa State since 29 May 2019.
- Muhammadu Mai Maina –– first Chief of Askira (1922–1964).
- Brigadier General Mohammed Mana –– Military Governor of Plateau State during the Ibrahim Badamasi Babangida regime and senator for Adamawa North in the 6th Assembly.
- Boss Mustapha –– Secretary to the Government of the Federation during the Buhari Administration.
- Bala James Ngilari –– Former Deputy Governor (2008–2014) and Governor of Adamawa State (2014–2015).
- Haske Kudla Satumari –– The founder of Haske Satumari Foundation (Marghi Lassa) he contested for Senate Southern Borno Senatorial district During 2019 and 2023 General election Under the platform of PDP.
- Zubeiru b. Adama (Fulani/Marghi) –– 4th Lamido of Adamawa.

== See also ==
- Marghi special
- Kingdom of Sukur
