= Babur and Bura people =

Ethnic group in Nigeria

Bura and Pabir People
Bura and Pabir People
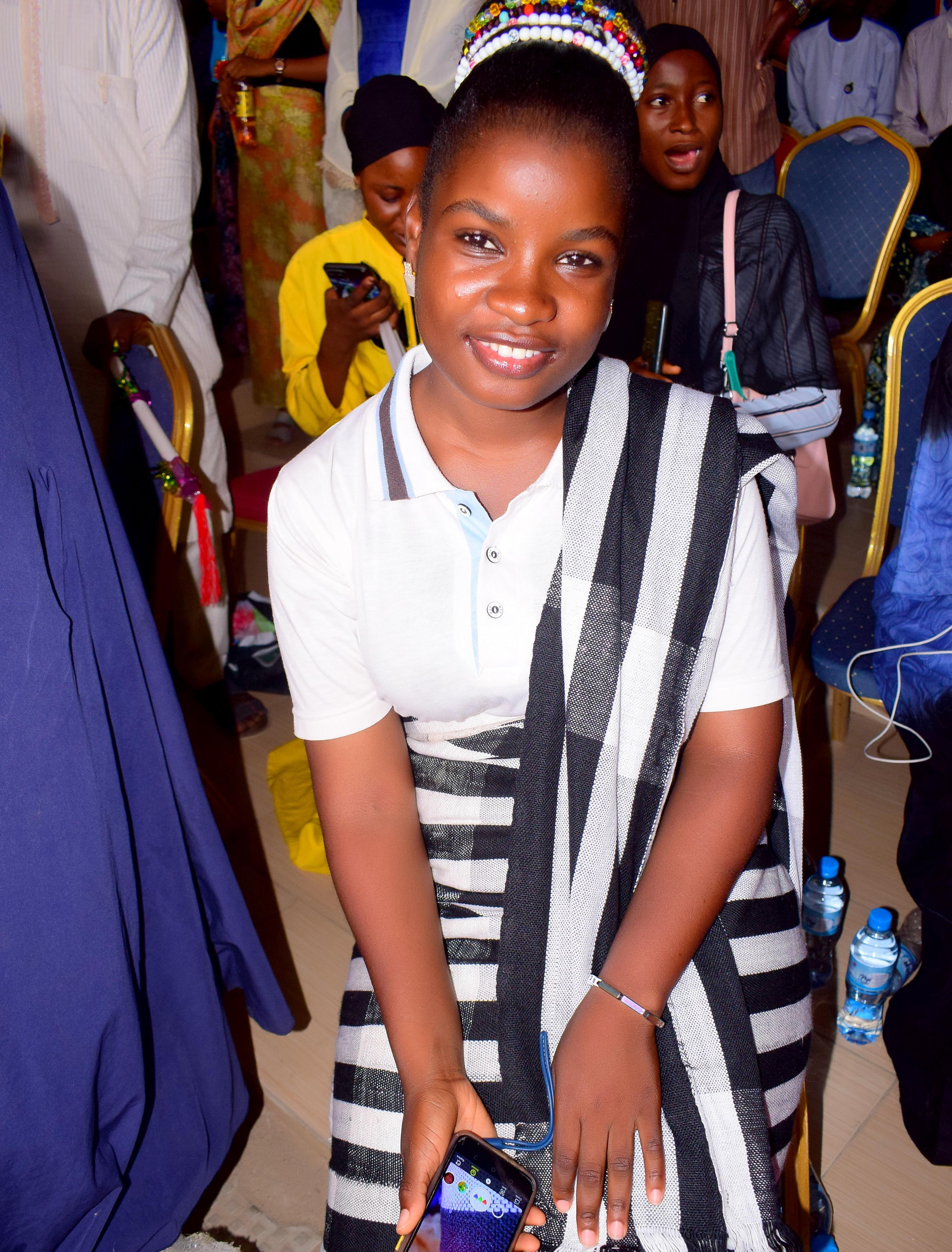
- A Bura-Pabir woman in a traditional attire

Regions with significant populations
- Borno State, Adamawa State, YobeState

Religion
- Christianity(22%), Islam(75%), Traditional(3-5%)

Related ethnic groups
- Hausa, Fulani, Kanuri, Chibok, Marghi

Bura people call themselves Bura or Bura-Pabǝr, while the hausas call them Babur or Baburawa are an ethnic group in Nigeria. They are located in Biu, Hawul, Kwaya Kusar, Shani and Bayo, from Ngulde in Askira/Uba and parts of Damboa LGA of Borno State and from Garkida in GombiLGA, from Barata in Shelleng LGA of Adamawa State. Bura-Pabir people are also found in Bularafa in Gulani LGA and Maza in Gujba LGA of Yobe State as well as on the fringes of Gombe State in Yamaltu Deba LGA (Dadin Kowa Area).

== Origin ==
Some traditional accounts of Bura-Pabir origins claim that their ancestors allegedly migrated from Yemen, travelling through Sudan and the Chad Basin before settling in northeastern Nigeria.[1] However, this alleged migration should be understood as an unverified origin tradition rather than a historically established fact. In the mid-16th century Yamta-ra-Wala defeated the Bura people and established Biu kingdom.^{[2]} Due to the intermarriage between Yamta Wala's people and the Bura people, a new breed of ethnic group called Bura-Pabir or Babur (in Hausa) was created and till today, Bura and Pabir' culture are very similar to the extent that they are regarded as one.^{[3][4][5]}

== Traditional ruler ==
The traditional ruler of Bura-Pabir people is locally called Kuthli or Kuhyi, and now an emir since the kingdom became an emirate. Since they are the major occupants of Biu Kingdom, their current ruler is Mai Mustapha Umar Mustapha II. He assumed office on 21 September 2020. Emir of Biu Kingdom.

== Marriage culture ==
Bura people have a distinct marriage system. When a girl child is born, the interested suitor signify his intention by presenting a leafy branch of tree into the mother's hut. If accepted, it is expected of him to keep on bringing gifts for the family, assisting the father in law with his farm and other things till the child become of age. Then, he has the right to employ the help of his friend to capture the wife and send her to his house before the bride price and other traditional items are provided.

== Language ==
Bura people are one of the speakers of Afro-Asiatic language of the Chadic group. They speak Bura Language and also have affinity with Hausa and Kanuri, Chibok.

== Religion ==
The Bura people were animists before the advent of Islam and Christianity in the 1920s. Their gods were represented by water, Iron, Stones, Forests etc. God is called Hyel or Hyel-mtaku (God my owner) and Haptu is a personal god who takes cares of the people.
