= Kogu =

Kogu may refer to:

== Places ==
- Kogu, a community in Ngamiland East, Maun Region, Botswana
- Koğu, a variant name for Koğuk, a community in Diyarbakır, Turkey
  - Kogu, a variant name for Koğu Dere, an arroyo (wadi) and intermittent stream in Diyarbakır, Turkey

=== Nigeria ===
- Kogu, a community in Biu LGA, Borno State, Nigeria, former capital of Biu Kingdom (now Biu Emirate)
- Kogu, a community in Shani LGA, Borno State, Nigeria
- Kogu, a community in East-Central State, Nigeria

== Fictional characters ==
- Kogu, a character in Dragon Ball Z: Bojack Unbound
