= Marghi special =

Nigerian cuisine

Margi special
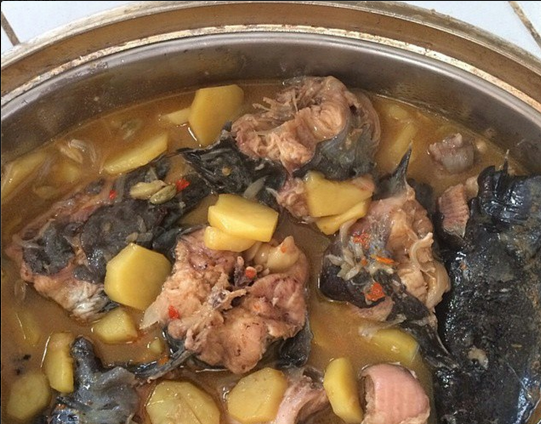
- Cat Fish pepper soup
- Type: Soup
- Place of origin: Nigeria
- Region or state: Northeast Nigeria
- Created by: Native to Margi people
- Main ingredients: Fish, Sorrel, spinach, onions, sometimes other vegetables, bean sprouts, tamarind-flavored broth

Margi Special (Marghi: Kifi Kubakuba) is a Nigerian cuisine indigenous to the Margi people of the northeastern region of Nigeria. It is typically made with fish from Lake Chad, sorrel, spinach, tomatoes (and sometimes also other vegetables such as taro), and bean sprouts, in a tamarind-flavored broth. It is garnished with scented garlic as well as other herbs, according to the specific variety of the margi special recipe. It can be served alone or with pounded yam, tuwo, white rice etc.

== See also ==
- List of fish dishes
- Nigerian cuisine
