= Biu Plateau =

Coordinates: 10°40′42″N 12°0′19″E

Major geological features near Cameroon line

The Biu Plateau is a highland area in Northeastern Nigeria containing many recently extinct volcanoes. It covers about 5,200 km^{2} (2,000 sq mi) and has an average elevation of 700 m (2,300 ft). The plateau lies between the Upper Benue Basin to the south and the Chad Basin to the north. High points are Wade Hill at 775 m (2,543 ft) above sea level and Wiga Hill, at well over 800 m (2,600 ft). The plateau is the source of many tributaries of the Gongola River, which have cut deep gorges. To the north the plateau slopes gently to the Bauchi plains and the Chad Basin.

There is evidence of early volcanic activity in the area during the Cretaceous, which ended about 66 million years ago. However, the plateau was built around the end of the Miocene, and the bulk of the rocks are Pliocene basalts that have erupted from small vents or fissures, and then spread in a thin layer over wide areas. Activity resumed in the Quaternary with thin flows of lava issuing from small cinder cones and filling the valleys. Most of the basalts date between 7 and 2 million years ago, but some are less than a million years old. The plateau includes many small pyroclastic cones caused by explosions when water penetrated downward and came into contact with fresh lava. There are a number of well-preserved volcanic cones rising above the Plateau along a NNW-SSE axis in the Miringa volcanic zone.

Some geologists consider that the volcanic activity in the Biu Plateau is associated with the activity in the Cameroon line to the south.

== See also ==
- Biu, Nigeria
- Biu Emirate
