= Mandaragirau =

- Location within Nigeria
- Coordinates: 10.696°N 12.330°E
- Country: Nigeria
- State: Borno State
- LGA: Biu

Mandaragirau (also spelled Mandara Girau) is a town in Borno State, Nigeria.

== History ==
Mandaragirau was important in the history of the Pabir tribe and the present Biu Emirate. The history of the Dagil clan, direct descendants of Yamtarawala, the founder of Pabir and its kingdom in the 15th century, is to a great extent linked to Mandaragirau.

=== Yamtarawala arrives in Biu ===
Reports written by European colonialists, established that Yamtarawala, the founder of the Babur tribe and its kingdom, came to Biu from Birni Ngazargamu in the early 15th century. He first settled in the Biu area at a place called Limbur, between Chikorkir and Mandaragirau, where he made his capital. He found the Bura people already in the area, at three main villages at Miringa, Diwar and Buratai, and defeated them with a strategy. He establed his kingdom in the area and ruled from 1535 to 1560.

The tribe name of the descendants of Yamtarawala, now "Babur", was actually "Pabir". The Pabir tribe is said to have been a mixture of the Bura clans, other tribes in the area and Yamtarawala's people, who came to the Viu (Biu) area in the early 15th century. According to Mr. J. G. Davies, District Officer of Biu (1935–1955) and author of the "Biu Book" (1954/56), the word Babur is a Kanuri/Hausa pronunciation. The spelling Babur was in use in 1906 and was made official in 1935, though the decision, according to Davies, was taken based on an incorrect fact.

Possibly Yamtarawala's kingdom soon split up into a number of small kingdoms (such as Mandaragirau, Gongdi, and Yimirdalang) of which the Babur kingdom was the greatest. It was finally established that the two most important dynasties were ultimately formed by the descendants of Yamtarawala after his death, one at Kogu (Biu), and the other at Mandaragirau. Yamtarawala's tomb at Limbur and some of his regalia are in the custody of the people of Mandaragirau. Yamtarawala never lived at Mandaragirau nor made it his capital. The Dagil chiefs made Mandaragirau their capital. This place has a very significant position in the history of the entire Pabir dynasties.

=== The Mandaragirau kingdom ===
Records from the British colonial rulers confirm that beginning circa 1740 in Biu area were kingdoms of Babur, Mandaragirau, Shani, Shelleng and some other village kingdoms like Kwaya Tera, Yimirdllang, Walama and Gusi. The Babur kingdom, which was rightfully controlled by Garga Kwamting when he was made Chief of Babur (Biu) in 1904, and consisted of the present village areas of Biu, Gur, Gunda, Garubula, Miringa, Buratai, Kida, Kwaya Bura, Hyema, Vina and Zira.

From the above statement made by Davies, it could be understood that even when Mai Garga Kwamting was made the Chief of Babur (Biu) in 1904 his domain did not include Mandaragirau area. Mai Mari, the Chief of Mandaragirau at that time retained his Chiefdom until he was deposed in 1911 by Mr. J H C Elder, the then District Officer in charge of Biu area under some controversial circumstance.

Mandaragirau was said to be a fairly large Babur village, situated near a rock which is called 'Kurting' from which the Biu Plateau is visible. The original settlement of the Mandaragirau Chiefs was a hilltop close to Virahyel along the Old Biu – Mandaragirau path. Davies confirmed in his book that the site was at that time still plainly visible containing the ruins of some 15–20 compounds (including the Chief's which was 50 yards across) and had fine views. In the plain below were remains of unfinished stonewall built against the Kanuri. In this original Mandaragirau ruled the Chief of Mandaragirau for he was a "Kuthli" (Chief or Mai) and not a Thlerima (Galadima). "'Kuthli' is the Babur word for Chief and this is the word used for all chiefs in the area such as Biu, Mandaragirau, Wuyo, etc."

The Colonial rulers stated that "little was known of Mandaragrau and its kingdom which at that time was almost as important as the Babur (Biu) kingdom for the Biu Chiefs had always minimized it to the Europeans; it split off from the Babur proper at an early date after Yamtarawala's death. It was founded by Ali Sokar, son of the 12th Babur Chief Mai Dawi and a brother of the 13th Biu Chief Mari Kwopci. (C. 1740). It became a separate kingdom helping the Babur in war but not subservient to it"

The colonial administrators further stressed that Chief of Mandagirau was not regarded as a Galadima of Mai Biu, but his position was always independent. He had the title of Mai and was appointing his own Thlerimas (Galadimas) at places like Mandaragirau, Liya and Ngulde and appointed a Kadafur at Diwa. Being related to the Biu Woviri ruling clan (he was of the Dagil clan) he helped Biu in war but paid no tribute to it though he collected tributes from his own hamlets.

It was reported that only in one occasion during the reign of Mai Ali Paskur (1838-1873) that Biu fought against the 8th Chief (also called Ali) of Mandaragirau a relative descendant like him from Yamta the great. And this according to Davies was the only known case of a Babur Chief having to employ force against a Babur Village. Mai Mari Biya (1873-1891) who ruled after Ali Paskur was said to have been cautioned from waging war against Mandaragirau. The then Alkali of Biu narrated to Davies that during Mai Mari Biya's attempted wars around Mandaragirau, "he was warned by his Malam (Soothsayer) that if he continue war against Mandaragirau he would not win, but if he left it the chieftainship of Mandaragirau would die in the time of his grandson, in the time of the Europeans: and this in fact happened."

=== Split of the Babur Kingdom ===
According to oral tradition, during the reign of the 12th Babur Chief Mai Dawi, his elder son Ali Sokar was the heir apparent of the kingdom. At one time when Ali Sokar went to war on behalf of the kingdom, their father Mai Dawi died in his absence and when he returned, to his greatest surprise, he discovered that his younger brother Mari Kopchi had taken over the throne to succeed their father. Ali Sokar was said to become so upset on the incident and shouted angrily 'Wan viri' (this exclamation in Babur means "who installed"). i.e. he wondered who on earth could have put Mari Kopchi on the throne to become chief of the Kingdom! As he did not want to fight his brother over the matter however, Ali Sokar angrily left on a dagil horse with his followers and established his kingdom at a hilltop close to Virahyel. According to the oral tradition it was from the exclamation "Wan viri" that the rulers of Biu from Mari Kopchi to date are recognized as 'Woviri' clan, and those of Mandaragirau are of the 'Dagil' clan referring to the dagil horse that Ali Sokar rode from Limbur area to the hilltop close to Virahyel where he established his kingdom.

The lineage foundation of the two kingdoms (Biu and Mandaragirau) from the original Babur Kingdom can rightly be illustrated as shown below;

1. YAMTARAWALA - C. 1535–60 (Founder of Babur Kingdom)
2. MARI VIRAHYEL
3. DAWI DIRA NALA
4. YAMTA AMBA
5. MAI YAMTA KUPAYA WADI
6. MAI MARI WATILA TAMPTA
7. MAI YAMTARA BANYE 1680
8. MAI MARI LUKU – 1690
9. MAI JAKWA BIRTIKTIK – 1700
10. MAI MARI THLAMA BAHARA -1710
11. MAI MARI TAYAR WRINKI 1720
12. MAI DAWI – 1730(Father of Mari Kopci & Ali Sokar)
13. MAI MARI KOPCI MAI ALI SOKAR 1740

(Biu kingdom) (Maidaragirau kingdom)
WOVIRI CLAN DAGIL CLAN

It was reported that the first 5 chiefs are mythical rather than historical and that Mai Mari WatilaTampta is the first of the definite chiefs. Between him and Yamtarawala there were probably more than 5 chiefs. The dates given against chiefs no 6–13 were based on probable average of 10 years reigns. (Davis, 1954:273).

Davies on page 108, 301 and 303 described the Dagil clan as the clan of Chief of Mandaragirau an offshoot of the Babur Kingdom. They are the main clans of Babur who came with Yamtarawala like the woviri clan. Davies stated that the Dagil clan were found in Mandaragirau, Viyukamda (Biu), Virahyel and Ngonga (Kida). The headquarters of the Dagil Kingdom was moved to the present Mandaragirau town probably towards the middle of the 18th century when the Chief defeated the original inhabitants of the Bwala clan and made one of them Thlerima (Galadima).

From the records of the British rulers in Nigeria (DCJ. 6) and particularly as found in the Notes on Babur tribe written by Mr. G.C. whitely, Assistant District Officer Biu (6/6/1917 – 28/10/1917), to the Resident Bornu province on the 26th January, 1918, nine (9) Chiefs ruled the Mandaragirau Kingdom in succession. The Chiefs were Mai Ali Sokar the founder (1740) to the 9th Chief; Mai Mari (deposed in 1911). The list of the Mandaragirau Chiefs as shown in the file (L. 6) was however believed to be incomplete. Legends put the number of the Dagil Chiefs at fifteen (15).

Also found in the file (L.6) are list of six (7) Galadimas of Mandaragirau. The Galadimas who were then known as Thlerma were Thlerma Dikotum (1st) to Aisami (7th)

LIST OF MANDARAGIRAU MAIS (as shown by the colonial masters) (Source: L 6, Appendix "C").

(C. 1740)

1. MAI ALI SOKAR (1) (brother to Mari Kopci of Biu)
2. MAI MARI BOHILIA (2) (Succeeded by his son)
3. MAI ARRI KOFALI (3)
4. MAI DIFUMA (4)
5. MAI DIMANTI (5)
6. MAI MARI BIYA (6)
7. MAI MARI MANTI (7)
8. MAI ARRI (8)
9. MAI MARI (9) (deposed in 1911)

KADALI (V. HEAD) The lineage chart indicates that the trend of succession from the 1st chief to the 4th had been directly from father to son, while that of the 5th to the 7th Chief were between brothers who were sons of the 4th Chief. The 8th and the 9th Chief were also brothers and sons of the 7th Chief. Kadali succeeded his father (Mai Mari the 9th Chief) who was deposed in 1911 but was relegated to the position of a Village Head under Biu.

LIST OF GALADIMAS OF MANDARAGIRAU:

1. DIKOTUM
2. TAPCHI
3. HALSIN
4. YAMTA
5. YERIMA TAPCHI
6. CHAPOLA JODA
7. AISAMI

The Mandaragirau Galadimas who were then known as Thlermas were mainly from the Bwala clan. The lineage chart indicates that Thlerma Dikotum was the first Galadima and was succeeded by his son Tampci (2). The 3rd and 4th Galadimas were brothers and sons of the 2nd Galadima. The succession trend from the 4th to the 7th Galadima had been directly from father to son. It should however be noted that Yerma Tampci (5), Chapolajoda (6) and Yerma Aisami (7) ruled after 1918 when the Dagil clan ceased to be ruling Mandaragirau. The lineage chart produced by Whitely in 1918 was up graded later with their names. The list of the Galadimas did not however include those of Liya and Ngulde.

=== Some important places in the history of the Babur kingdoms ===
Dlimbur, Tila Lake and Viukuthla village are some of the significant archaeological sites in the history of Biu and Mandaragirau chiefdoms.

==== Dlimbur ====
As it has earlier been mentioned, Dlimbur is the place where Yamtarawala settled when he came to Biu area. It is also the site where his tomb was located. It was said that in the olden days any new Pabir chief (Biu and Mandaragirau Mais) undergo some sort of initiation and bapktism at the tomb. It was also a practice in those days that couples who had not begotten any child visit the site and offer sacrifices seeking for Yamta's blessing so that the woman could conceive and have a child as it was then believed. Usually such woman if she were lucky to give birth would name the child after Yamta if a male, and Awa (Awa Pacham, Yanta's mother) if a female. The Tomb and some of Yamtarawala's regalia are in the custody of a "Kadala" (the tomb caretaker) from the Zoaka clan in Mandaragirau. The site was however set ablaze by suspected Boko Haram insurgents on 20 November 2013.

==== Tila Lake ====
According to the records, the Tila Lake was full of crocodiles of a creamy colour which were different from those found in the surrounding rivers. The Tila crocodiles were sacred as they represented the spirit double of two or more clans; the Woviri clan of Chief of Biu, the Dagil clan of the former Chief of Mandaragirau and probably though not certain the amaza clan of Kwaya Bura and the lasama clan of Tila. The crocodiles of the Woviri and Dagil clans were said to occupy different part of the lake and were of different colours (the former blackish and the latter reddish). It was believed that the fortune of a man was bound up with the fortune of his double (crocodiles). When a crocodile dies, his "double" was also thought to die and vice versa. This belief was common and it was applied to the wellbeing of the chiefs of Biu and Mandaragirau. (Davies 1954: 278)

According to the record, the crocodile superstition were said to be when the Bura inhabitants of kwaya bura, afraid of the war like tendency of the chief of Babur told him of them in order to stop him from bothering them of which after consultation with his wife and others he (chief) believed him and there was peace between the Babur and kwaya bura. In another story it was said that when Yamtarawala was at Limbur he ordered the chief of Taula to build a village by the big open space he had seen and the chief complied and settled among the Bola people. Suddenly it was said, one day the water rose and became a lake. The priestly lasama clan found the crocodiles and claimed that they were the children and relations of Yamta. It was believed thereafter that the chiefs of Babur were not allowed to look at the lake for if one sees his crocodile double he would fall sick. It was as well believed in those days that other relations of the clans whose crocodile "doubles" were also in the lake could not look at the lake as they might lose their site and become blind. (Davies 1954: 278).

==== Viukuthla village ====
According to the reports Viukuthla was one of the places used as capital by the Biu Chiefs in the 18th century. Davies on page 153 of the Biu Book also confirmed that Viukuthla, about four miles east of Biu, "is the site where the chiefs of the Babur and Mandaragirau were buried".

In conformity with this practice, it has been established that the chiefs of Mandaragirau including Mai Mari, the last Chief were buried at Viukuthla.

=== Colonisation of the Babur area ===
When the British came to the Babur area in 1903 and found some chiefdom in the area, they made deliberate policy of up grading the powers and domain of the Chief of Biu. This led to the separation of powers and ultimate deposition of some chiefs in the area including that of Mandaragirau.

In a report of a case study on the Evolution of Hierarchical Institutions conducted from Biu between 1972 and 1974 by one American professor Ronald Cohen, it was stated that when the British arrived in South "Pagan District" of Borno Province, they found a few petty chiefs at places like Biu, Mandaragirau, Gulani and Wuyo. They established their headquarters at Gujba in South Borno in 1902–3, and from there the British contacted chiefs at Gulani and at Biu. Biu was at first put over the Babur towns around Biu and North of it excluding Mandaragirau but including a few nearby Bura Villages like Kida and others. (R. Cohen 1972: 158).

The British met the Biu Chief Garga Kwamting at Peleminta. At Mandaragirau, they met an independent Chief called Mari whom was said to have grown strong enough to defy the Biu Chief. Mai Mari assumed the throne of Mandaragirau Chiefdom after the demise of his brother Mai Ali, the eighth Chief. That was during the reign of Mai Mari Biya of Biu (1873-1891). Mai Mari Biya (or Marbia) was the father of Mai Garga Kwamting.

Subsequently, the colonial rulers ‘singled out’ the Chief of Biu and evolved the policy of extending his area until he was in charge of what is now Biu Emirate. Actually the British had only one overall policy to conquer an area, obtain compliance to their authority and create a system of administration operationalized at first in tax collection, courts, and the ultimate right to choose and depose chief. (R Cohen 1972:158)

According to oral tradition during that time (1904) when the British wanted to merge the two Babur Kingdoms (Biu and Mandaragirau) into a single kingdom under one Babur Chief, the two Chiefs then Mai Garga Kwampting of Biu and Mai Mari of Mandaragirau were invited by the Resident to Magumeri for a meeting and possible assessment of them that could have formed the basis of selecting one of them to become the Chief of the Babur. It was said that Mai Mari of Mandaragirau was deceived and dissuaded not to honour the invitation by the colonial rulers and so he allowed Mai Garga Kwamting to go and represent the two of them.

At Magumeri when the Resident asked for the Chief of Mandaragirau, he was informed that Mai Mari had declined his sermon and declared that the Europeans were not superior to him. The Resident became very sad and upset with the supposed response of Mai Mari and as such Mai Garga Kwompting was automatically recognized and made the Chief of Babur. The installation of Garga Kwamting as the Chief of Babur was reported on page 48 of the Biu Book by Davies. Mandaragirau was from then to become a village unit under Biu. Mai Mari who refused to recognize the Babur Chief as superior vehemently rejected it and he continued to retain his chiefdom up to September 1911 when he was finally deposed. The episode leading to his final deposition was well documented. It was also in December 1911 that the Chief of Tera at Gulani, Mai Kore, was deposed. (Davies 1954:42).

=== Resistance by the Mandaragirau and Bura communities against the upgrading of the Biu chief ===
In the case study conducted by Dr. Ronald Cohen he stated that two major problems emerged that time that threatened the extension of Biu sovereignty by the British. These were the independence of Mandaragirau and the resentment by the Bura at Biu over lordship. Although semi-independent, the other Babur areas seem to have had a traditional sense of respect for the Mai at Biu. Mandaragirau on the other hand felt itself the equal of Biu. Each Chief declared himself to be the direct lineal descendant of the legendary founder (Yamtarawala) of the Babur dynasty through two sons of that founder.

There was therefore a tradition of independence and rivalry between the two towns that was part of the local political situation. The British fully appreciated this but they were more interested in pursuing a Policy consolidation into more easily administered districts and divisions. Having a plethora of petty chiefdoms was inimical to such goals. Consequently, it was decided to place Mandaragirau under the jurisdiction of Biu.(R Cohen 1972: 158).

At first Mandaragirau rejected any subordination to their traditional rival. The collection of taxes and paying of respect to the Chief at Biu had to be imposed through the threat of armed forces. Ultimately Mandaragirau reluctance to accept the new system led in 1911 to the deposition of its chief. His son and several others of the chiefly lineage were all given a chance but none proved satisfactorily obedient. Finally in 1917 a completely different lineage was given the chiefship as village Head. In a footnote Cohen explained that this lineage was the founding lineage of Mandaragirau from whose hands the town was wrested many years ago by the descendants of the Biu royal dynasty – Mandaragirau branch. (R Cohen 1972: 159).

Nevertheless, according to Cohen, some hard feelings remain. Songs were remembered that commemorate this final humbling of Mandaragirau in the face of Biu's growth in power. And there was some opinion in the area that in terms of development, infrastructure and education Mandaragirau had been slighted in order to make sure that Biu's power and modernization supersedes that of her old rival. The second problem after Mandaragirau was that of Bura. The incorporation of the acephalous of Bura community under the authority of Biu has gone through a series of phases. The first phase involved the enumeration of all Bura villages and the enforced collection interpreters. Later from about 1908–14 to 1918, the Bura were placed progressively more clearly under the developing emirate Native Authority at Biu. This involved the appointment of Pabir officials from Biu, who were responsible for taxation and administration of Bura areas South and West of Biu.

The result of this incorporation was a series of armed confrontation and village burning in which the Bura were forcefully made to accept Pabir over – rule. In several cases Bura Village Heads were arrested and brought to trial in Biu where they were given jail sentences. For the Pabir that period represented the utilization of British power to expand their control over all of the Bura speaking area. For the Bura it represented a war of resistance against colonialism and the unwanted rule of Biu over a previously independent people. Some accented to this rule; others ran away across the Hawul River to Northern Adamawa in order to avoid Biu over lordship.

According to Ronald Cohen, besides the social and political forces operating to make Biu the central authority over all Pabir towns, there were also political factors. Elder, the Assistant Resident at this crucial period and Mai Ali Dogo (1908-1935) were able to cooperate with one another to achieve mutually agreed goals. The Mai realized very soon that the British wish to centralize local administration and regularize taxation. He used these goals to advance the power of Biu far beyond anything that had ever been possible in the pre-colonial era. Mai Biu fully accepted the military superiority of the British and manipulated any information going to them to solidify and expand his own control over the entire Pabir-Bura area. By 1921 when Elder finally left the area, the mutual trust and cooperation that had built up between these two men was a major factor in the creation of Biu Emirate.(R Cohen 1972:159).

Davies in the Biu Book rightly summarized the whole episode by stating that the policy of singling out the chief of Biu and extending his area was not done without struggle and resistance but Mr. Elder (District Officer 1908–1911, 1918–1920) persevered and by the time he left, the people were outwardly following Biu. Whatever they may have thought in their hearts and however much they follow Biu because of the British government in background. (Davies 1954:73).

=== Attempts made by the Dagil clan to restore the Mandaragirau Chiefdom ===
It was clear that in spite of the pressure and persecution of the 9TH Mandargirau Chief by British to place him under Biu, it was not in fact until 1918 that Mandaragirau agreed to follow Biu executively. And even at that period however, the Dagil Clan did not quite give up all hopes of reviving their Chiefdom. There were several requests and petitions written by them to the various governments right from the colonial period from 1927 to the Nigerian Military Government in 1983.

For instance in 1926 one Ali Boy, a grandson to Mai Ali the 8th Chief of Mandaragirau met Mr. Patterson (Resident Borno Province) and Cpt. J.H.G. Smith at Maiduguri to demand for the installation of his father as Chief of Mandaragirau. Cpt. Smith was a District Officer in Biu (1924, 1925 - 1926). In 1927 Ali Boy followed his discussion on the subject with the two Colonial Officers, with a letter to the District Officer Biu. In the letter, Ali Boy claimed that when his grandfather, Mai Ali died, his father Ndalimari was the heir apparent to have succeeded Mai Ali. However, because Ndalimari was then too young to take over the throne, Mai Mari who was a brother to Mai Ali took over with a promise that he would relinquish the chieftaincy to Ndalimari the right heir to the throne when he (Ndalimari) grew up. That promise was not fulfilled up to the time the Europeans came and removed the Chieftaincy of Mandargirau. Ali Boy therefore requested the British authority to re-institute the Chiefdom of Mandaragirau and make his father the chief.

In response to the petition Cpt A. L. Milroy, the Assistant District Officer Biu (10/3/1927-7/11/1927) wrote to the Resident Bornu Province on 16 April 1927 on the matter. Cpt Milroy highlighted that the Chiefdom of Mandaragirau ceased to exist long ago and that he had not seen any record of previous discussion regarding the revival or otherwise of the chiefdom. Moreover, he stated that the Emir of Biu at that time (Mai Ali Dogo) was very averse to doing so and that he (Mai Biu) claimed that he was advised by Major Edgar a onetime District Officer of Biu (7/2/1921 - 19/1/1924) not to do so. The Assistant District Officer concluded with a strong recommendation that Ali Boy's request should not "be upheld particularly in view of the Emir’s wishes". Consequently, the petition was finally rejected.

In 1958, the British Government in Nigeria set up a Minority Commission to receive complains and resolve issues relating to community boundary, chieftaincy affairs etc. from aggrieved persons and or communities. On 10 March 1958 the Dagil sons and grandsons wrote and made a presentation to the commission at Kaduna. In the presentation, they complained of "an unjust removal" of the 9th Dagil clan chief of Mandaragirau, Mai Mari, and called for the revival of their chiefdom. They also cried for schools, hospitals and other social facilities that were not available in the area at that time. In response to the presentation Mr. H. S. Helton the then District Officer of Biu wrote to the Dagil clan on 18 September 1958. The D.O. recalled the entire incident leading to the deposition of the Dagil Chiefdom. He emphasized that "it was the Policy of the British Government gradually to bring the Buras, the Teras and the Mandaragirau people under the Chief of the Babur (Biu)". Therefore, he said, the British government did not intend to restore the independent Sarauta of Mandaragirau. As regards the need for schools and hospital, while he admitted that there were so many communities that were far from medical facilities in the area, he advised them to send their children to schools at Biu, Miringa and Sura (C.B.M). Mr. Hilton also advised them to use community labour to open the road between Mandaragirau and Biu.

=== Mandaragirau as village area under Babur district ===
Consequent upon the demise of Mai Mari, the then 9th Chief of Mandaragirau in 1911, his son Kadali who succeeded him was later relegated to the position of a village Head under Biu. It was reported that kadali later quarreled with the Chief of Biu, Mai Ali Dogo and was deposed in 1917. He was succeeded by his brother Midala Yamta. Kadali left Mandaragirau for some time but returned later and settled near the village (1925 about) where he died. The following year, Midala Yamta was accused of embezzling tax money and was imprisoned. During the period he was serving the jail term, his brother Maina Tafida acted for mim. He returned after his sojourn in prison but refused to resume his position and left Mandaragirau. According to some source, Maina Tafida was asked to take over the Village Headship but he declined declaring that he would only accept to take over if a he would be made a Chief. Thereafter the Headship of Mandaragirau was given to the Bwala clan, the founder of the village who had been holding the position of Thlerma (Galadima) under the Chief of the Dagil clan. However, since the time of Maina Tafida to date, the Dagil clan has been holding the position of Wakil (Representative and Adviser) to the Bwala Village Heads wielding much influence on the authority of the village headship. After some time Mandaragirau was placed under the District Head Babur at Mirnga during the time of Galadima Usman Pokta (1952-1976), the District Head.

It is pertinent to mention that the Babur District headquarter was formerly at Biu under the direct control of the Emir of Biu. In about 1924/25, the Babur District Headquarter was moved from Biu to Buratai with Maina Garga as the District Head. And in 1935/36 Maina Garga moved the Headquarter to Miringa as a result of an outbreak of guinea warm disease at Buratai. Midala Madu succeeded Maina Garga as District Head on 23 January 1936. Following the appointment of Midala Madu (who changed his name to Mohammed Aliyu) as Emir of Biu on 20 September 1951, Malam Usman Pokta took over as District Head Babur on 1 January 1952. Malam Usman Pokta was then Biu N. A. Chief Scribe. (Davies 1954:83,92 & 103) The Village Areas under Babur District during the time of Galadima Usman Pokta were Miringa, Mandaragirau, Buratai, Gur, Gunda and Garubula. Presently, all the village areas, except Gur have been upgraded to District Areas.

Galadima Usman Pokta was retired in 1976 and was succeeded by Alhaji Midala Madu who died in November, 1980. Alhaji Maina Bukar succeeded Alhaji Midala Madu. In the month of February, 2002 Alhaji Maina Bukar also died.

Alhaji Maina Sanda Mohammed, the present District Head who succeeded Maina Bukar was appointed District Head Mirnga in 2003. He was installed and turbaned as District Head the same time with Alhaji Hussaini Maina, the first District Head of Mandaragirau on 8 May 2003.

=== Campaign for the upgrading of Mandaragirau as a district ===
The struggle for the upgrade of Mandaragirau Village Area to a District status started affectively since the late seventies. The move was initiated and encouraged by the elites of the area in diaspora and the few students of Mandaragirau indigene then in high institutions of learning. This class of people, by the end of 1980 formed the Mandaragirau Area Development Association (MADA). The main aims and objectives of the Association were to initiate and pursue for developmental projects for the entire village area. The demand for the upgrading of Mandaragirau to a District therefore became one of its main projects. The Association became a sort of a pressure group that mobilized the community and severally organized some activities and occasions at Mandaragirau through which requests for District were articulated and constantly sent to the various level of government in the state. So many write-ups were also made in the Media by the association and other individuals towards the achievement of this objective.

As the people of Mandaragirau relented no effort in the pursuance for the upgrading of the area as a District, God answered their prayers and in 2002 Mandaragirau village area was made a District. The present Emir of Biu Mai Umar Mustapha Aliyu in his magnanimity also appointed late Malam Hussaini Maina Mari as the first District Head of this area. Alhaji Hussani Maina was a retired Director from the Ministry of Agriculture, Borno state. He was also at one time Sole Administrator of Biu Local Government. He was not only an indigene of the area but also a grandson of the late Mai Mari the 9th Chief of the Dagil clan of Mandaragirau. Hussani Maina and other newly appointed District heads in Biu emirate were installed and turbaned as District Heads of their respective areas by His Royal Highness the Emir of Biu on the 8th may, 2003. It was said to be a very colorful ceremony.

After the installation ceremony at Biu the new district Head came to Mandaragirau and had a brief reception with his subjects. Everybody in the area was happy and jubilating for this achievement. Later in the evening of the same day, Mal. Hussaini left Mandaragirau for Maiduguri to come back later for the actual post installation ceremony to be organized by the Emirate Council and the people of his domain. Unfortunately, on his way, and just about few kilometers to Maiduguri his car was involved in a ghastly accident and Mal. Hussaini Maina lost his life. It was really sad, shocking and tragic. His remains was brought back to Mandaragirau and buried in his family house.

Mandaragirau remained without a District Head for quite some time with the present village Head Lawan Musa Yerima, performing the job of the District Head on an acting capacity. It was not until 2008 that Malam Mohammed Maina Mari, junior brother to Late Hussaini was appointed District Head of the area. He was turbaned on 8 May 2008. The villages Areas under the District are Mandaragiraau, Liya and Deburo.

== Economy ==
The people of Mandaragirau are mainly farmers. The area, being located in the savannah, has very fertile land that grows very well most of the food and cash crops. The main food crops grown include guinea corn, millet, maize, cassava, sweat potatoes and groundnuts, Many varieties of vegetables and fruits are also produced. Cotton is also produced in some parts of the area. Some of the people are also engaged in petty trading and animal husbandry. The nearby main markets that are patronized are Biu, Mirnga, Kwaya, Sabon gari and Mandaragirau.

== Education and health ==
There are primary schools in some of the villages in the area, but the district has only one Universal Basic Education (UBE) Junior Secondary School located at Mandaragirau. The students population in the school always outreached the facilities available to cater for them. As regards health facilities, the district has only two health centers, one located at Mandaragirau, and the other at Liya with no qualified doctors. Most patients are referred to the general hospital Biu.

== Climate and weather ==
Mandaragirau as located in the northern part of Nigeria experiences both wet and dry season and the dry season range from Early October to May.This area experience a low annual rain fall ranging 650mm to 750mm.

=== Temperature ===
The temperature during the day time is (35° ) degrees and night (21°) degrees.

== Bibliography ==
- Biu Book (1954-1956) by J.G. Davies
- The Emirates of Northern Nigeria (1966), Preliminary of their Historical Traditions, by S.J. Hogben & A.H.M. Kirk Green.
- Savannah Journal (December, 1974), The Evolution of Hierarchical Institutions: A Case Study from Biu, Nigeria. By Ronald Green
- Notes on Babur Tribe (memo 1918), (DCG. 6), by G.C. Whiteley
- Encyclopædia Britannica, Biu (Nigeria)
- Petition to District Officer Biu (1926/27), (District File M. 6 1911–27) by Ali Boyi
- Paper Presentation to Minority Commission, 10 March 1958 by Mai Dagil Sons & Grandsons
