= Kibaku people =

Ethnic group in Nigeria

Kibaku language

Regions with significant populations
- Borno State, Nigeria

Related ethnic groups
- Pulai/Warga, Kwanda, Kanuri, Hausa

The Kibaku people are an ethnic group inhabiting the Chibok Local Government Area, in eastern Borno State in Nigeria.

== Origin ==
The Kibaku people are a conglomeration of the ethnic and culture of Babir/Bura, Kanuri, Kilba, Margi, Shuwa, and Fulani. They migrated from the Kanem-Bornu Empire to Chibok hills when the empire was about to collapse. However, the 19th-century Islamic jihad and slave raids also coerced many tribes to move down to the hill. Tribes like Pulai/Warga who came from Viyu Kithla (now Biu) and Kwanda who came from Konduga, Tstitihil from Maiva, Karagu from Birnin Ngazargamu and other places later formed the Kibaku people.

== The Historic European Conquest ==
Borno empire fell peacefully into the hand of British colonialists in 1904. However, there are some tribes who refused to be governed by the British rule. One of these tribes is the Kibaku people who resided in Southeastern Borno and were causing havoc in the economical system of the British government by blocking the trade route from Maiduguri to Yola. Therefore, in 1906, the British government decided to subjugate the Kibaku people.

The British Government gave Lieutenant Chapman and Chaytor the duty of bringing the Kibaku people to their knees. Their appointments were based on their historical success in the British attack on Gujba in Borno and the British invasion of Kano in 1903. As expected, the two men were reported to have aggressively trained about 170 men which comprises foot soldiers and mounted soldiers. There are also reports of Africans who carried machine guns, ammunition and other valuables along.

However, the Kibaku people who have generationally resisted the penetration of Borno and Adamawa resisted the British Army for seven days. This forced the British Government to appeal to them for peaceful acceptance of British rule which was also a futile attempt.

Eventually, the British government employed the services of their two informants, Jatau and Mai Maina, who were also from Kibaku land with political appointments in British political scheme in Borno province. Jatau as the head of his people and Mai Maina as the head of Damboa. As expected, the two revealed the secret of the Kibaku people and they were defeated in 1907.
