= Kogu, Biu =

Kogu
- Village
- Location within Nigeria
- Coordinates: 10°25′06″N 11°56′55″E
- Country: Nigeria
- State: Borno State
- LGA: Biu
- Elevation: 344 m (1,129 ft)
- Time zone: UTC+1 (WAT)

Kogu is a large village in Biu LGA, of southwestern Borno State, in northeastern Nigeria. Kogu is located on a tributary of the Yangari River about 34 kilometres (21 mi) southwest of the town of Biu.

Mari Watirwa, the 20th Emir of Biu, established his capital at Kogu about 1795, after he drove the Fulani out of Biu. In 1838, his grandson, Emir Mari Biya, moved the capital to the town of Biu.
