= Biu, Nigeria =

Biu
- City and local government area
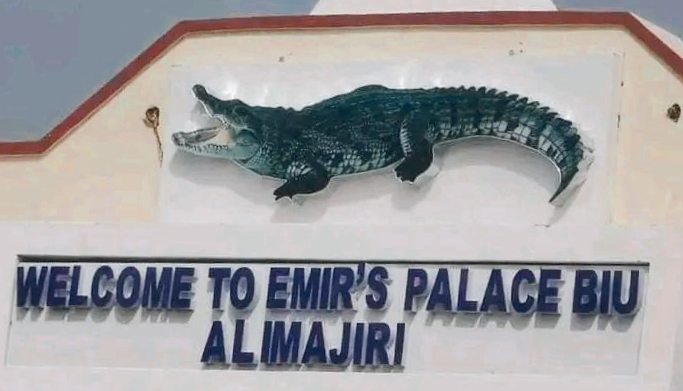
- Interactive map of Biu
- Biu shown within Nigeria
- Coordinates: 10.6111°N 12.195°E
- Country: Nigeria
- State: Borno State

Population (2006)
  - Total: 176,072
- Time zone: UTC+1 (CET/WAT)

Biu is a city and a Local Government Area (LGA) in southern Borno State of Nigeria. The town is the administrative centre of the LGA and was once the capital of the Biu kingdom, and is now capital of the Biu Emirate. Biu lies on the Biu Plateau at an average elevation of 626 metres (2,054 feet). The region is semi-arid.

== Demography ==
=== Ethnic groups ===
The inhabitants of the region are mainly Babur and Bura people (also known as Pabir ), Tera, Marghi, Mina and Fulani people. Tera, Marghi and Mina are Biu–Mandara languages of the Chadic language group.

=== Languages ===
In a 2023 demographic survey of Internally displaced persons (IDPs), the local government was found to be predominantly Bura (Babur). The most commonly reported languages (spoken at homes and places of primary residence) present in the local government area were Bura – 68.3% and Hausa – 24.8%. Other languages present included; Kanuri – 2.0%, Eastern or Adamawa Fulfulde – 1.9%, Marghi – 1.6%, Longuda – 0.7%, and Kilba/South Marghi – 0.7%. This data was not obtained from a nationally co-ordinated population headcount. The last time Nigeria included ethnic and linguistic data in its enumeration parameters was in the national census of 1963.

== History ==
The name of Biu was initially called Viu which in Babur and Bura Language means high. The Biu kingdom became established around 1670 in the reign of Mari Watila Tampta. King Mari Watirwa (r. 1793–1838), whose capital was near Biu at Kogu, defeated Fulani invaders from the Gombe Emirate to the west. In 1878 Mari Biya, became the first Babur king to rule from Biu. The emir's palace is now situated in the town.

With British rule, Biu division was created in 1918. Mai Ari Dogo was acknowledged as the first emir of Biu in 1920. The area became known as the Biu federation after 1957, when the districts of Shani and Askira were added to the emirate. Maidalla Mustafa dan Muhammad (b. 1915) became Mai Biu, also styled Kuthli, in 1959.

== Geography and economy ==
The LGA is mostly located in the northern Guinea savannah (NGA) agroecological zone, with a small portion in the northeast, the Kimba area, lying in the dryer Sudan savannah zone. The economy is mixed agricultural, based on herding cattle, goats, sheep, horses, and donkeys and farming sorghum, millet, maize, cowpea, and cotton. Agriculture consists mostly of small farms using traditional methods.

There is a small mining industry in Biu, with iron ore, gravel, magnesite, uranium, feldspar, topaz, mica, granite, aquamarine, nephelite, and salt being extracted.

As of 2010, the Gombe-Biu-Mubi road was in poor repair. In early 2022, the area was earmarked to receive vital infrastructure funds from multiple international charities to improve transport links.

=== Communities ===
The Biu Local Government Area has a large number of rural communities in addition to Biu, which include:

- Balbaya
- Buratai
- Charenji
- Chemi Moda
- Dula
- Dibirow
- Filin Jirgi
- Galdimare
- Garubula
- Garundana
- Gunda
- Gur
- Kabura
- Kagul
- Kimba
- Kirkidum
- Kogu
- Kunar
- Kumari
- Kugur
- Kwaya Kusar
- Maina Hari
- Mandafuma
- Mandagirau
- Mangada
- Mbulamel
- Mirnga
- Piku
- Sabon Layi
- Tum
- Viu kutha
- Waka
- Wakama
- Wonka
- Wuyo
- Wurang
- Yamarkumi
- Yawi
- Zara

=== Climate ===
Biu experiences a yearly temperature of 32.16 °C (89.89 °F), 2.7% higher than Nigeria's national average, with 36.38 millimetres (1.432 inches) of precipitation and 61.57 wet days (16.87% of the time).

== Health ==
Malnutrition in southern Borno State is extensive. In 2005, Médecins Sans Frontières (MSF) set up an intensive care feeding centre in Biu hospital, the main referral hospital for the region. In October 2009 there was an outbreak of Cholera in the area, a disease that spreads through drinking contaminated water. About 600 people were rushed to the Biu General Hospital for diagnosis and treatment. The management of the hospital, in conjunction with the State Ministry of Health, decided to evacuate the patients to an isolated treatment camp.
