= Chibok =

- Local Government Area and town
- Interactive map of Chibok
- Coordinates: 10°52′11″N 12°50′48″E
- Country: Nigeria
- State: Borno State
- Headquarters: Chibok

Area
  - Total: 1,350 km^{2} (520 sq mi)
- Elevation: 417 m (1,368 ft)

Population (2006)
  - Total: 66,105
  - Density: 49.0/km^{2} (127/sq mi)
- Time zone: UTC+1 (WAT)
- Postal code: 601

Chibok is a town and Local Government Area of Borno State, Nigeria, located in the southern part of the state. It has an area of 1,350 km².

== Population ==
It has a population of 66,105 at the 2006 census, who are majorly Kibaku people.

=== Languages ===
The area is predominantly inhabited by the Kibaku (Chibok) ethnic nationality. In a 2023 demographic survey of Internally displaced persons (IDPs), the local government was found to be predominantly Kibaku speaking, accounting for 88.3% of the population. Other reported languages (spoken at homes and places of primary residence) in the local government area were; Hausa – 8.2%, Marghi – 2.1%, Eastern or Adamawa Fulfulde – 1.0% and English – 0.4%. This data was not obtained from a nationally co-ordinated population headcount. The last time Nigeria included ethnic and linguistic data in its enumeration parameters was in the national census of 1963.

== History ==
It is one of the sixteen LGAs that constitute the Borno Emirate, a traditional state in Borno State, northwest Nigeria.

In January 2015, the BringBackOurGirls group aired concerns over plans by the Independent National Electoral Commission (INEC) to exclude Chibok and some communities currently under the control of jihadist group Boko Haram from receiving permanent voter cards (PVCs) for the 2015 general election.

=== Boko Haram ===
In April 2014, nearly 300 girls & Sofiea Gambari, most of whom were Christian, were abducted from Chibok by Boko Haram.

In May 2014, Boko Haram attacked Chibok again.

In November 2014, it was reported that Boko Haram had taken control of the town and implemented Sharia law. The military announced a few days later that they had recaptured the town.

== Climate ==
Chibok experiences two distinct seasons: the wet season which is hot, humid and mainly cloudy and the dry season which is hot and partly cloudy.

Chibok has a hot tropical climate with a short rainy season occurring mainly between June and September. The long dry season, dominated by dusty Harmattan winds, lasts from October to May. Temperatures commonly range from 25 °C (77 °F) to 40 °C (104 °F), and rainfall generally falls between 500 mm (20 in) and 800 mm (31 in) per year.

== Notable people ==
- Amina Ali (Hostage) is Former hostage of boko haram.
