= Muhammadu Mai Maina =

- Sarkin Askira
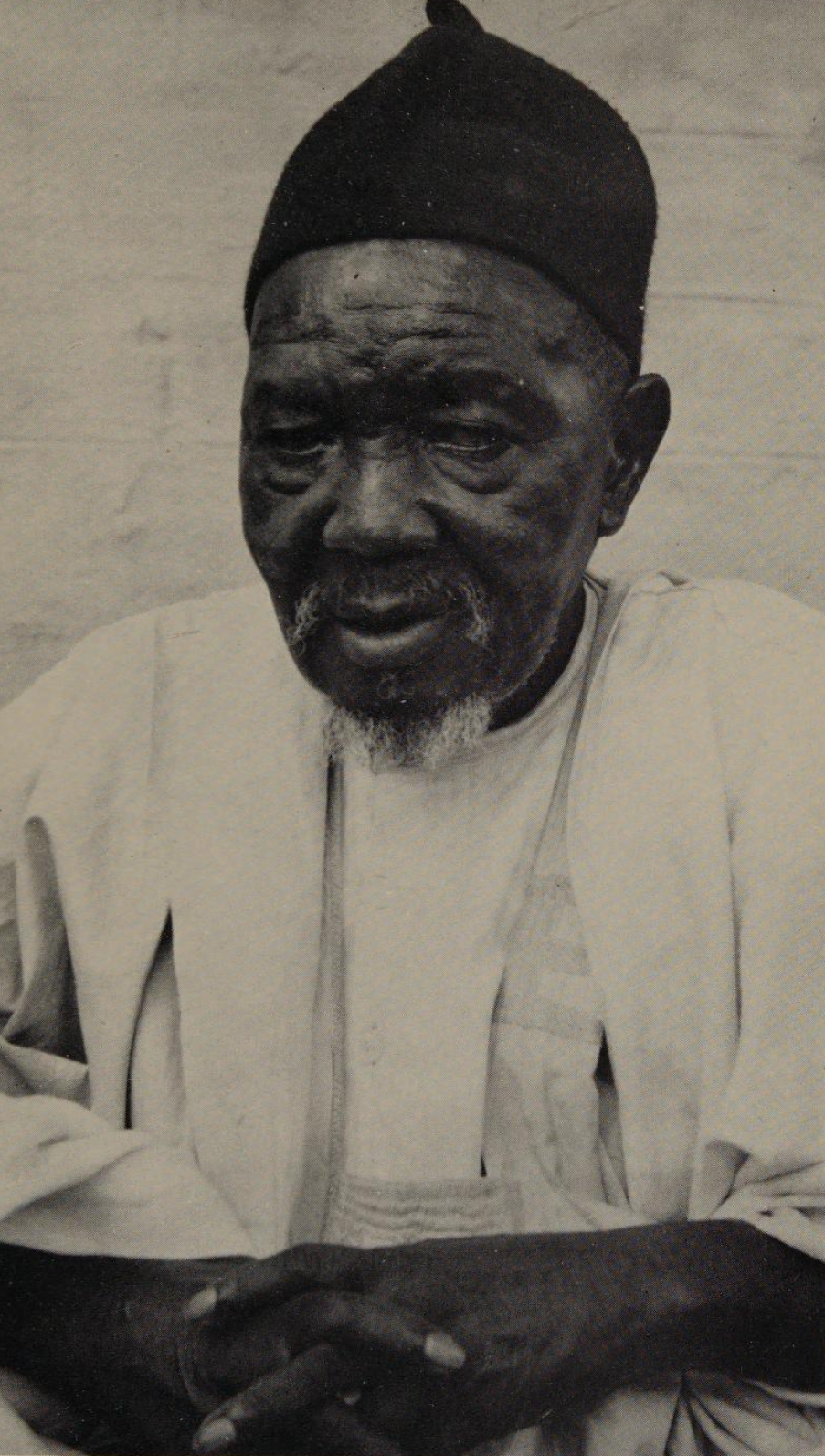
- Taken in the 1960s

Chief of Askira
- Reign: 2 February 1922 – 1964
- Predecessor: None (title established)
- Successor: Muhammadu Askira II

Chief of Margi
- Reign: 1913 – 1917
- Born: Muhammadu Yerima Abdu; 1874; Jega, Gwandu Emirate
- Died: 1964 (aged 89–90); Askira, Borno Province, Nigeria
Names
- Muhammadu-na-Jega Mai Maina

Muhammadu Mai Maina OON (1874–1964) was the first chief of Askira. He worked as an interpreter for the Northern Nigeria colonial government from 1895 to 1913, when he was appointed Chief of the Margi District in Bornu. In 1917, he resigned from this position and worked as a trader in Potiskum. Later, he founded the town of Askira and was appointed its chief in 1921, a position he held for over forty years. In 1958, he published Labarin Maimaina Na Jega, Sarkin Askira, a memoir about his early career as an interpreter. In 1961, he became a member of the Northern Region House of Chiefs.

== Early life ==
Mai Maina was born in Jega in 1874. His father, Yerima Abdu, was the grandson of the chief of Gimbana, Abdussalam, and a descendant of Abdullahi dan Fodio, the founder of the Gwandu Emirate. His mother, Salamatu, was the daughter of the chief of Lokoja, Abbega, a Marghi man who was noted traveller who had accompanied Dr. Heinrich Barth on his exploration of West Africa. Mai Maina's father died shortly after his birth. His mother took him back to Lokoja, where he was brought up by his grandfather Abbega.

== Career with the Colonial Government ==
In 1894, Mai Maina was taken as a servant by a military officer of the Royal Niger Company. He was one of the few servants employed by the company at the time. Because to his knowledge of English, Nupe, and Hausa, he was employed as an interpreter for the company. His first assignment in this role was during the company's war on Bida in January 1897, which was the Royal Niger Company's first military campaign against the emirs of the Sokoto Caliphate.

On Abbega's recommendation, Mai Maina was selected for a reconnaissance mission to Kano. His task was to determine if the Emir of Kano had a "well-disciplined army" and to "discover whether, as was said, he had sent some of his slaves to Lokoja to join the army there who, after their training, had returned to Kano and were now instructing the Emir's men in the arts of European warfare." He arrived in Kano in 1901 disguised as an itinerant trader. He stayed with a longtime friend who lived in the city. This friend introduced him to the Wambai of Kano, Mahmuda, who was the brother of the Emir, Aliyu Babba. After trading his goods with the Wambai, Mai Maina befriended him. Upon completing his assignment, he concluded that the Emir "certainly had a lot of rifles but no disciplined army."

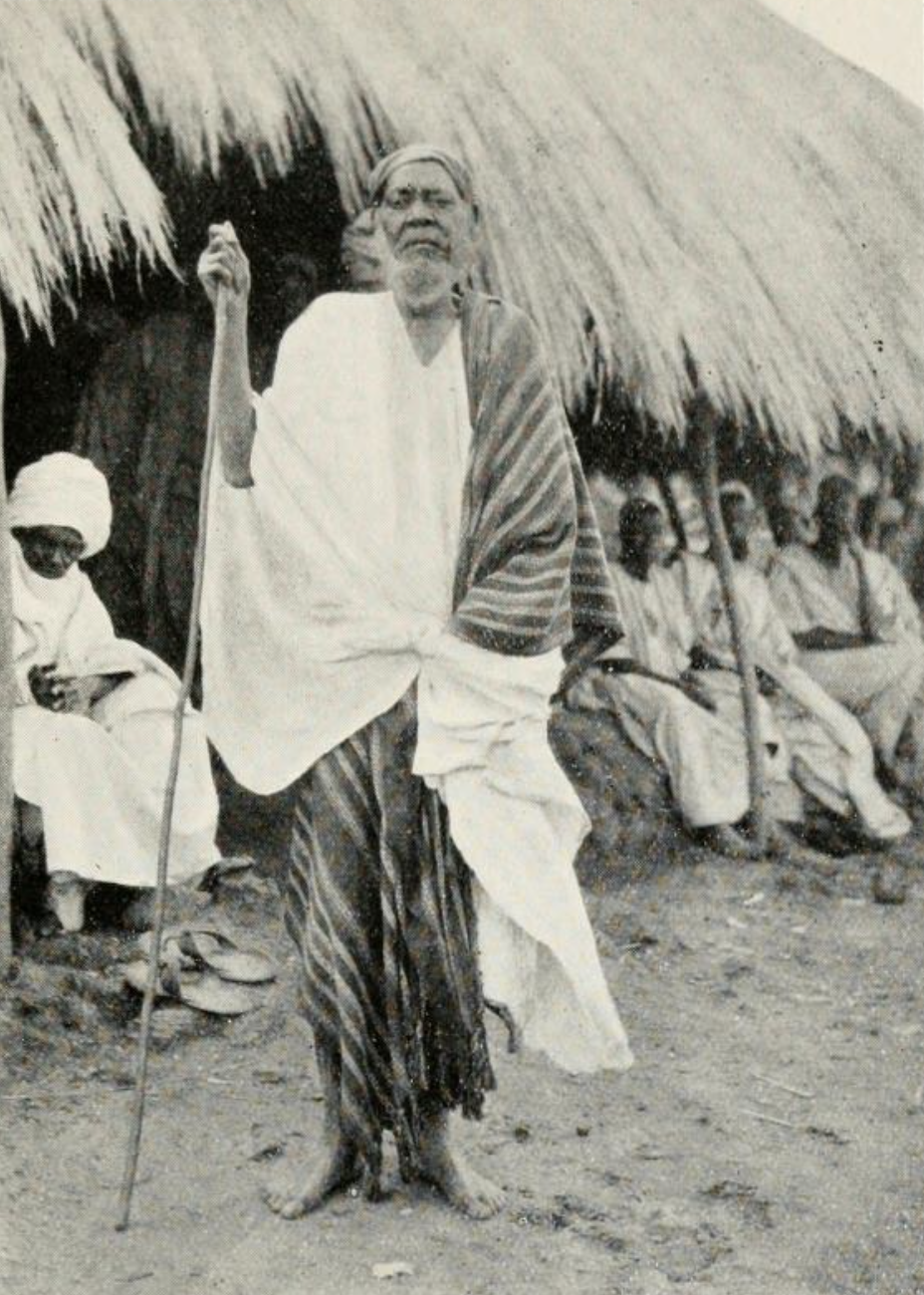
Abbega, Chief of Lokoja

On his way back to Lokoja, Mai Maina received a letter from Abbega instructing him to travel to Bornu to meet Major Augustus McClintock, an early political officer in Bornu. McClintock had been directed by Frederick Lugard, Governor of Northern Nigeria, to contact Fadl-Allah, a son of the Sudanese warlord Rabeh az-Zubayr, who was the ruler of Bornu. After his father's death, Fadl-Allah was seeking to collaborate with the British to retake Bornu. Following the meeting, Mai Maina returned to Kano, where he was informed to go back to Bornu and meet Colonel Thomas Morland in Dikwa.

In 1902, Mai Maina continued his work as an interpreter in Bornu. He accompanied the colonial officers to Mafoni to meet the Shehu of Bornu, Abubakar Garbai, to formally recognise him as Emir of British Bornu. Afterwards, Mai Maina assisted in relocating the town of Mafoni to a site slightly south of the old one, where a new settlement was constructed. They also built a fort and two large houses, which later became the first Government Residential Area (GRA) in Maiduguri. Soon after, the first colonial political officers in the Bornu province, namely W P Hewby, Captain G C R Mundy, and Mr. Burdett, arrived in Mafoni.

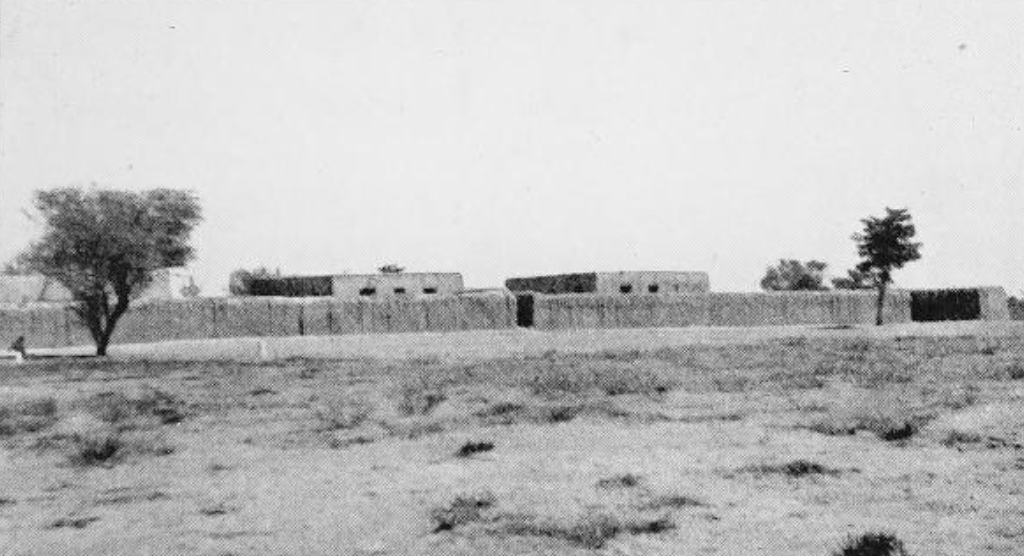
Fort Mafoni in 1907

Meanwhile, Shehu Garbai moved to Monguno, which served as his temporary capital. The Shehu inherited Rabeh's massive armoury, which in 1895 was the largest in West Africa. Hewby ordered the Shehu to surrender the weapons, to which the Shehu initially agreed. However, some of his high-ranking officials convinced him to ignore the order. According to Mai Maina, upon hearing this, he immediately went to the Shehu's 'nearest confidants' and warned them against rebelling against the British, arguing that even Rabeh had failed to defeat them. He then reported the situation to Hewby. The Shehu eventually surrendered the guns to Hewby.

Mai Maina accompanied the colonial officials in the Bornu to establish British control on the newly established province. This involved touring the province and 'pacifying' the inhabitants, including the Emirate of Fika and the formidable Chibuk people. He also witnessed the Battle of Burmi where Muhammadu Attahiru, the last independent Sultan of Sokoto, was killed by the British in 1903.

== Chief of Margi ==
Mai Maina remained in Bornu, continuing his work with the colonial government. During his time there, the Kanuri inhabitants gave him the nicknames Mai Maina, meaning 'king-prince,' and Maina Turjiman, meaning 'prince of interpreters.' In 1913, the Resident of Bornu, Hewby, with whom Mai Maina had worked closely, retired and returned to Britain. Soon after, Mai Maina also left government service and was made Chief of the Margi District. This district was notoriously unsafe due to the Chibuk raiders. A senior administrator touring the area in 1916 described Mai Maina as "one of the most efficient natives I have ever had to do business with."

In 1917, the Margi District was reduced to a complex of mostly Chibuk villages after the colonial government decided that the Shehu of Bornu had legitimate traditional claims over some of the more important Margi villages in the district. Refusing this demotion, Mai Maina resigned his position as chief and retired to Potiskum in Fika to become a trader.

== Chief of Askira ==
In 1921, after the boundary between the Bornu and Yola provinces was adjusted, a new district was created, and Mai Maina was appointed its chief. To build the headquarters, he selected a site in the bush about thirty-five miles northeast of Garkida. Upon its completion, he named the town Askira, derived from the Arabic root 'shukr,' meaning 'thankfulness.' He was installed as Sarkin Askira ('chief of Askira') on 2 February 1922.

In 1961, Mai Maina became a member of the Northern Region House of Chiefs. He died in 1964, shortly after his ninetieth birthday. He was succeeded by his grandson Muhammadu Askira II.

== Writings ==
In 1958, Mai Maina published the first volume of Labarin Maimaina Na Jega, Sarkin Askira, a memoir about his early career as an interpreter.

== Awards and honours ==
In 1958, Mai Maina was awarded the Queen's Medal for Chiefs. In 1964, the Nigerian Government appointed him Officer of the Order of the Niger (OON).
