= Biu Emirate =

- traditional state
- Biu shown within Nigeria
- Coordinates: 10.6111°N 12.195°E
- Country: Nigeria
- State: Borno State

Population (2019)
  - Total: 9,500,000
- Time zone: UTC+1 (CET/WAT)

The Biu Emirate is a traditional state based in Biu in Borno State, Nigeria. Prior to 1920 it was referred to as the Biu Kingdom.

== History ==
The rulers of Biu are numbered from Abdullahi, later known as Yamta-ra-Wala or Yamta the Great, who established his rule about 1535. Around 1670, in the reign of Mari Watila Tampta, it became known as a kingdom. The main ethnic group is the Babur/Bura people, related to the Kanuri people. The founder was said to have come from elsewhere, captured the main town in the area, then founded a new capital in Dlimbur, which is now an archaeological site. His descendants formed two rival dynasties, one at Kogu and the other in nearby Mandaragirau.

King Mari Watirwa (r. 1793–1838) of Kogu defeated Fulani invaders from the Gombe Emirate to the west. In 1878 Mari Biya, became the first Bura king to rule from Biu. The emir's palace is now situated in the town. With British rule, Biu division was created in 1918. Mai Ari Dogo was acknowledged as the first emir of Biu in 1920. The area became known as the Biu federation after 1957, when the districts of Shani and Askira were added to the emirate.

The Biu Emirate includes the Biu, Hawul, Kwaya Kusar and Bayo local government areas. The Biu Emirate has by convention always produced the Deputy Governor of Borno State, representing the south of the state. Until recently, the Biu Emirate was one of three in Borno State, the others being the Borno Emirate and the Dikwa Emirate. In March 2010 the Borno State Governor Ali Modu Sheriff split the old Dikwa Emirate into the new Bama and Dikwa Emirates. This triggered petitions from the people of Hawul, Kwaya Kusar and Bayo to also have separate chiefdoms, which the governor had stated he would do "if the need arises".

== Rulers ==
Mai Biu, also styled Kuthli, were:

Start	End	Ruler	Notes
c. 1535	1580	Yamta-ra-Wala	
1580	?	Mari Vira Hyel	
?	?	Dira Wala	
?	?	Yamta Amba	
?	c. 1670	Yamta Kupaya Wadi	
c. 1670	?	Mari Watila	
?	?	Yamta ra Bangye	
?	?	Mari Luku	
?	?	Jakwa Birtitik	
?	?	Thlama Bahara	
?	?	Tayar Warinki	
?	c. 1740	Dakwai	
c. 1740	c. 1750	Mari Kopchi	aka Mari Kwabchi
c. 1750	c. 1760	Di Forma dan Mari Kopchi	son of Mari Kopchi
c. 1760	c. 1770	Garga Moda dan Mari Kopchi	brother of Di Forma
c. 1770	c. 1780	Dawi Moda (Di Moda dan Di Forma)	son of Di Forma
c. 1780	c. 1783	Di Biya dan Di Moda	son of Dawi Moda
c. 1783	1783	Di Rawa dan Di Biya	son of Di Biya
1783	1793	Garga Kopchi dan Di Biya (d. 1793)	brother of Di Rawa
1793	1838	Mari Watirwa dan Di Rawa (d. 1838)	son of Di Rawa
1838	1873	Ari Paskur dan Mari Watirwa (d. 1873)	son of Mari Watirwa
1873	1891	Mari Biya dan Ari Paskur (d. 1891)	son of Ari Paskur
1891	1908	Garga Kwomting dan Mari Biya (d. 1908)	son of Mari Biya
1908	1920	Ari I Dogo dan Garga Kwomting (b. 1876 - d. 1935)	son of Garga Kwomting

Emirs were:

Start	End	Ruler	Notes
1920	1935	Ari I Dogo dan Garga Kwomting (see above)	
1935	1951	Ari II Gurgur dan Garga Kwomting (d. 1951)	brother of Ari I
1951	1959	Muhammad `Aliyu dan Ari Dogo (b. 1907)	son of Ari I
1959	1989	Maidalla Mustafa dan Muhammad Aliyu (b. 1915)	son of Muhammad `Aliyu; District Head of Kwaya territory before his accession
June 1989	14 September 2020	Mai Umar Mustapha Aliyu	son of Maidalla Mustafa
21 September 2020	Incumbent	Maidala Mustapha Umar Aliyu II	Son of Mai Umar Mustapha Aliyu

== Local Government Areas in Biu Emirate ==
Biu Emirate covers four Local Government Areas:

- Biu
- Bayo
- Hawul
- Kwaya Kusar
