= Bura language =

Language spoken in Nigeria

Bura
- Mya Bura or Bura-Pabir
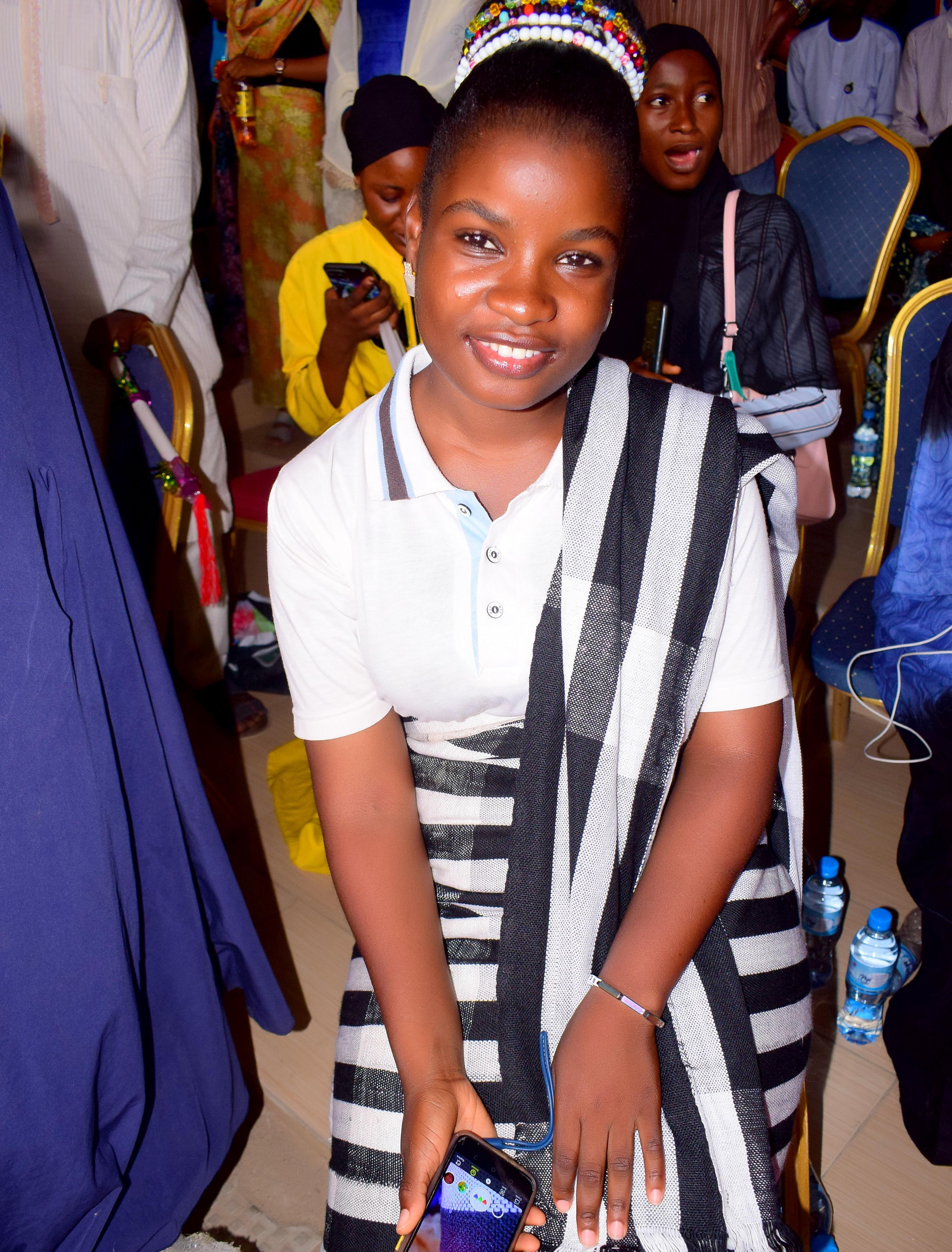
- A Bura-Pabir woman in a traditional attire
- Native to: Nigeria
- Region: Borno State, Adamawa State, Yobe State, Gombe State
- Native speakers: 510,000 (2020)
- Language family: Afro-Asiatic: Chadic; Biu–Mandara; Bura–Higi; Bura languages (A.2); Bura

Language codes
- ISO 639-3: bwr
- Glottolog: bura1292
- Linguasphere: 18-GBB-d

Bura (also known as Burah, Burra, Bourrah, Bura-Pabir, Babir, Babur, Barburr, Mya Bura, Kwojeffa, Huve, Huviya) is a Chadic language spoken in Northeastern Nigeria by the Bura-Pabir people. Dialects include Pela, Bura Pela, Hill Bura, Hyil Hawul, Bura Hyilhawul, and Plain Bura. The language is closely related to Kilba, Cibak, Margi and a few other north-eastern Nigerian Languages.

== Phonology ==
=== Consonants ===
| | | Labial | Alveolar | | Post-alv./ Palatal | Velar | Glottal |
| | | Labial | plain | lateral | Post-alv./ Palatal | Velar | Glottal |
|---|---|---|---|---|---|---|---|
| Nasal | | m | n | | ɲ | ŋ | |
| Stop | voiceless | p | t | | | k | ʔ |
| Stop | voiced | b | d | | | ɡ | |
| Stop | prenasal vl. | ᵐp | ⁿt | | | ᵑk | |
| Stop | prenasal vd. | ᵐb | ⁿd | | | ᵑɡ | |
| Stop | implosive/ejc. | ɓ | ɗ | | | kʼ | |
| Affricate | voiceless | | t͡s | | t͡ʃ | | |
| Affricate | voiced | | d͡z | | d͡ʒ | | |
| Affricate | prenasal vl. | | ⁿt͡s | | ⁿt͡ʃ | | |
| Affricate | prenasal vd. | | ⁿd͡z | | ⁿd͡ʒ | | |
| Fricative | voiceless | f | s | ɬ | ʃ | x | h |
| Fricative | voiced | v | z | ɮ | ʒ | ɣ | |
| Fricative | prenasal vl. | ᶬf | ⁿs | ⁿɬ | ⁿʃ | ᵑx | |
| Fricative | prenasal vd. | ᶬv | ⁿz | ⁿɮ | ⁿʒ | ᵑɣ | |
| Approximant | | w | | l | j | | |
| Trill | | | r | | | | |

Consonant clusters also occur among plosives/affricates, nasals, and fricatives.

=== Vowels ===
| | Front | Central | Back |
|---|---|---|---|
| Close | i | | u |
| Mid | e | ə | o |
| Open | | a | |

== Orthography ==
In the 2010 Bura-English Dictionary, Roger Blench proposed an orthography similar to that of Hausa based on the Latin alphabet with the addition of the letters ɓ, ɗ, ə, and ƙ, as well as the following digraphs:

| IPA | Orthography |
|---|---|
| [ɬ] | tl |
| [ɮ] | dl |
| [ɣ] | gh |

== See also ==
- Bura Sign Language
