= Askira/Uba =

Local Government Area in Borno State, Nigeria

- Local Government Area
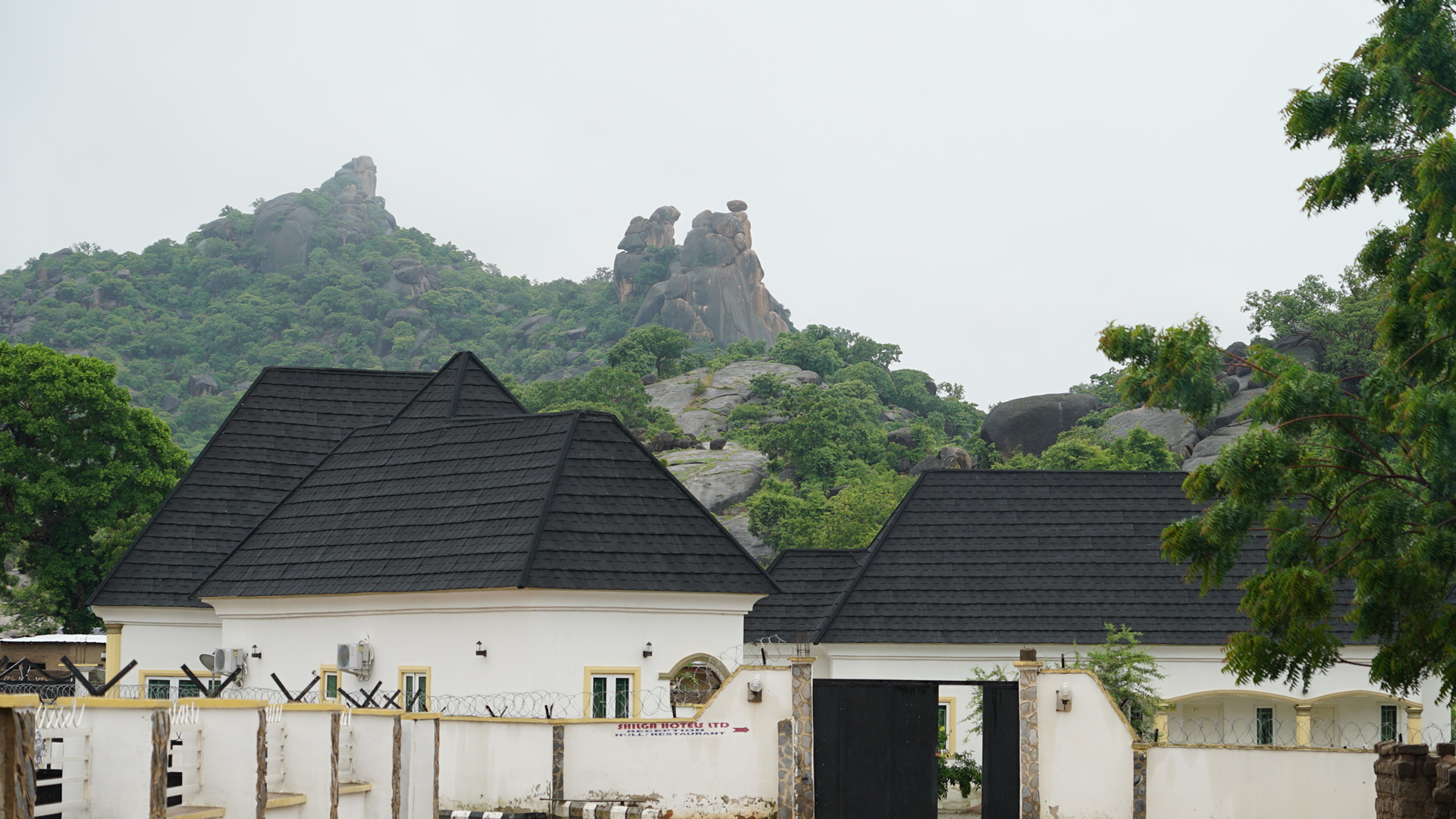
- Interactive map of Askira/Uba
- Coordinates: 10°42′N 12°54′E
- Country: Nigeria
- State: Borno State
- Capital: Askira
- Local Government Area: Askira/Uba was created 1976.

Government
  - Type: Democracy
  - Executive Chairman: Abubakar Umar Mazhinyi (All Progressive Congress)

Area
  - Total: 2,362 km^{2} (912 sq mi)

Population (2006)
  - Total: 138,091
  - Density: 58.46/km^{2} (151.4/sq mi)
- Time zone: UTC+1 (WAT)
- Postal code: 601

Askira/Uba is a Local Government Area of Borno State, Nigeria. Its headquarters are in the town of Askira. It has an area of 2,362 km^{2} and a population of 138,091 at the 2006 census. The postal code of the area is 601.

One of the villages of Askira/Uba, Lassa, was the origin of a new virus found in the blood of returning American missionaries, and first identified by a virology research team in a laboratory at Yale University, who named it "Lassa virus" after the location where it first appeared. Askira/Uba has two Emirate Councils namely; Askira Emirate and Uba Emirate.

Askira town, the local government headquarters was founded by Muhammadu Mai Maina in 1921. In July 2014, the villages of Huyim and Dille in Askira/Uba LGA were attacked by suspected Boko Haram gunmen, with nine and thirty-eight deaths respectively. The attackers came from the Sambisa Forest. Displaced residents "need help from governments and spirited individuals."

== Demography ==
In a 2023 demographic survey of Internally displaced persons (IDPs), the local government was found to be predominantly Marghi and Hausa speaking. The most commonly reported languages (spoken at homes and places of primary residence) present in the local government area were; Marghi – 45.3%, Hausa – 26.8%, Fulfulde, specifically Eastern or Adamawa Fulfulde – 11.0%, Cibak (Chibok) – 5.9%, Mafa – 3.7%, Kamwe – 3.5%, Kanuri – 3.1%, Unknown – 0.4% and English – 0.4%. This data was not obtained from a nationally co-ordinated population headcount. The last time Nigeria included ethnic and linguistic data in its enumeration parameters was in the national census of 1963.

== Climate/Geography ==
The dry season in Askira is scorching and somewhat cloudy, whereas the wet season is hot, muggy, and cloudy. The average annual temperature fluctuates between 15 °C (59 °F) and 39 °C (103 °F); it is rarely lower or higher than 12 °C (54 °F) or 42 °C (108 °F). The hot season, which runs from March 8 to May 10, lasts for 2.0 months and with daily highs that average more than 37 °C (99 °F). In Askira, April is the warmest month of the year, with typical highs of 39 °C (102 °F) and lows of 26 °C (78 °F). The 2.8-month cool season, which runs from July 3 to September 28, has an average daily maximum temperature of less than 32 °C (89 °F). With an average low temperature of 16 °C (60 °F) and high temperature of 32 °C (89 °F), January is the coldest month of the year in Askira.

There are two distinct seasons in Askira Uba LGA, which has a total area of 2,362 square kilometers or 912 square miles. The rainy season lasts longer than the other and is characterized by exceptionally hot temperatures. Large tracts of dry, arid land are found in the region, which has a semi-arid climate. In Askira Uba, the average temperature is 37 degrees Celsius or 99 degrees Fahrenheit, and the local humidity is 18%.

=== Clouds ===
Over the course of the year, Askira's average percentage of cloud cover varies significantly based on the season. In Askira, the clearer season lasts about 4.4 months, starting around October 26 and ending around March 6. January is the clearest month of the year in Askira, with the sky being clear, mostly clear, or partly cloudy 58% of the time on average. The cloudier portion of the year lasts about 7.6 months, from around March 6 to October 26. In Askira, May is the cloudiest month of the year, with the sky being overcast or mostly cloudy 75% of the time on average.
