= Cibak language =

Chadic language spoken in Nigeria

Cibak
- Kyibaku
- Native to: Nigeria
- Region: Borno State
- Native speakers: 200,000 (2014)
- Language family: Afro-Asiatic: Chadic; Biu–Mandara; Bura–Higi; Bura (A.2); Cibak

Language codes
- ISO 639-3: ckl
- Glottolog: ciba1236
- Linguasphere: 18-GBB-a

Cibak (variously rendered Chibuk, Chibok, Chibbak, Chibbuk, Kyibaku, Kibbaku, Kikuk) is an Afro-Asiatic language spoken by about 200,000 who are mostly Kibaku people in Nigeria.

Cibak is spoken in Askira/Uba, Chibok and Damboa local government areas in the south of Borno State in Nigeria. The majority of speakers are Christians (about 92 %); most of the schoolgirls abducted in the 2014 Chibok kidnapping by Boko Haram were Cibak-speakers and Christians.
