= Margi language =

Chadic language of Nigeria, Cameroon and Chad

Margi
- Native to: Nigeria
- Region: Adamawa, Borno, Gombe, Yobe State
- Ethnicity: Margi people
- Native speakers: 240,000 (2020)
- Language family: Afro-Asiatic: Chadic; Biu–Mandara; Bura–Higi; Bura (A.2); Margi
- Writing system: Latin

Language codes
- ISO 639-3: mrt
- Glottolog: marg1265
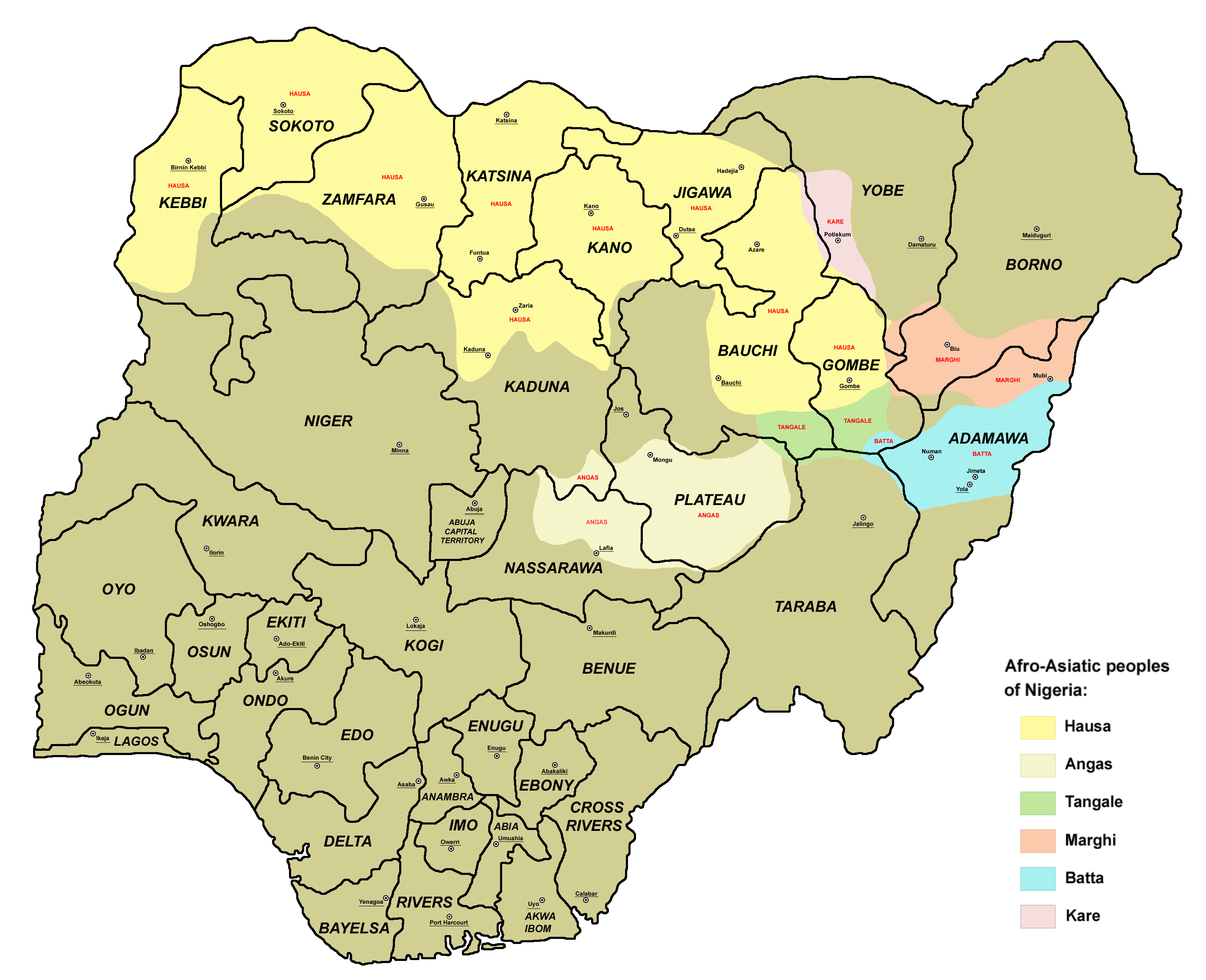
- Ethnic territories of the Marghi-speaking people in Nigeria (pinkish red)

Margi, also known as Marghi and Marghi Central, is a Chadic language (a branch of Afroasiatic) spoken in Nigeria, Cameroon, and Chad. It is perhaps the best described of the Biu–Mandara branch of that family. Marghi South language and Putai are closely related and sometimes considered dialects of Margi.

There are several kinds of Marghi language, including Madube, Izge, Lassa, Gulak, Damboa, Mulgwai, Uba and Sukur.

== Phonology ==
=== Vowels ===
	Front	Central	Back
High	(i)	ɨ	(u)
Mid	(ɛ)		(ɔ)
Low		a	

According to Maddieson (1987), Margi is noted for having a vertical vowel system, with only two phonemic vowels, /ɨ/ and /a/, in native vocabulary. Loan words also distinguish /ɛ/ and /o/.

=== Consonants ===
Margi has a large consonant inventory, with a number of labialised consonants and typologically infrequent speech sounds such as a labiodental flap. Hoffmann (1963) describes 84 consonantal phonemes, a very large number compared to that of most languages. This system, with a great number of non-click consonants, compares to that of the Caucasian language Ubykh, having the largest inventory of any language without clicks. However, Hoffmann's list of consonants includes all sequences of consonant clusters occurring in onsets in the language. Many of these clusters have since been analysed as sequences, such as /pt/ and /bz/. Labial–coronal consonants are excedingly rare in the languages the world. If labialized consonants are counted separately, there are 66 consonants that remain in the analysis, and 54 if it is interpreted as a /Cw/ sequence.

Consonants
		Labial		Dental		Alveolar				Post- alveolar	Palatal	Velar	Labio- velar	Glottal
		Labial		Dental		sibilant		lateral		Post- alveolar	Palatal	Velar	Labio- velar	Glottal
		plain	lab.	plain	lab.	plain	lab.	plain	lab.	Post- alveolar	Palatal	Velar	Labio- velar	Glottal
Nasal		m	mʷ	n							ɲ	ŋ	ŋʷ	
Plosive/ Affricate	voiceless	p	pʷ	t	tʷ	ts				tʃ	c	k	kʷ	ʔ
Plosive/ Affricate	voiced	b	bʷ	d		dz				dʒ	ɟ	ɡ	ɡʷ	
Plosive/ Affricate	implosive	ɓ̰	ɓ̰ʷ	ɗ̰										
Plosive/ Affricate	prenasal vl.	ᵐp		ⁿt	ⁿtʷ	ⁿts	ⁿtsʷ			ⁿtʃ	ᶮc	ᵑk	ᵑkʷ	
Plosive/ Affricate	prenasal vd.	ᵐb	ᵐbʷ	ⁿd		ⁿdz				ⁿdʒ	ᶮɟ	ᵑɡ	ᵑɡʷ	
Fricative	voiceless	f	fʷ			s	sʷ	ɬ	ɬʷ	ʃ	ç	x	ʍ	
Fricative	voiced	v	vʷ			z		ɮ		ʒ	ʝ	ɣ		
Sonorant	modal	ⱱ		r				l			j	ɣ	w	
Sonorant	glottalic										j̰		w̰	

The velar /ɣ/ may be closer to an approximant [ɰ]. The closely related language Bura is similar but has a palatalised lateral series as well. /ⱱ/ is used in mimesis rather than in lexical vocabulary. The glottalised consonants /ɓ̰ ɓ̰ʷ ɗ̰/ have been described as either creaky voiced or implosive; according to Maddieson, they are evidently both, as in Hausa.

The sequences that Hoffmann included in his consonant inventory are all labial–coronal:

/ps [fs], pɬ, pç [fç], pt, pts, ptʃ, mpt, mpts, mptʃ, bz [vz], bɮ, (bʝ [vʝ]), bd, bdz, bdʒ, mbd, mbdz, mbdʒ, ɓ̰ɗ̰, mn/

== See also ==
- Marghi South
- Marghi West
