= Kilba people =

Nigerian ethnic group

Kilba
Regions with significant populations
- Hong, in Adamawa State, Nigeria.

Languages
- Həba

The Kilba people (also called Həba) are an ethnic group in the Hong local government area of Adamawa State (formerly Gongola State) in Nigeria.

== History ==
In the past, Həba lived in large clan-based mountain communities. These mountain communities were Pella, Gwaja, Hong, Kulinyi, Garaha, Bangshika, Miljili, Gaya-jaba, Gaya-maki, Gaya-skalmi, Gaya-gou, Gaya Fa'a, Gaya Jabba, Ndlang, Hyama, Kinking, Motaku, Kwapor, Za and Zivi, all in the present Hong Local Government. The Həba clan-based mountain communities were each ruled by a "Təl kəra ma" (King of the mountain community). "Kəra ma" means "mountain top". Töl is pronounced as "ttle", which means King. A particular Töl therefore, was known by his clan name. Each of the mountain communities was made up of several villages. These villages had their method of communication. They had specific ways of doing everything, and life was very smooth and enjoyable. The Təl kəra ma was a secular-cum-religious ruler. He had a cabinet made up of Yaduma, Midala, Bira'ol, Kadagimi, Kadala, Dzarma and Batari, depending on the community. Each had their designated cabinets. The cabinets of all the Töls still have the same character. Həba was a tribe with a formidable army. They were articulate and had distinct ways of doing things and of getting things done. Həba was a tribe with formidable unity. After the 18th century AD, Dr. Henry Barth(1965) (a German traveler) came across Höba during his voyage.

=== Political structure ===
One Furkudəl was bringing Həba, in their various clan-based mountain communities under one central government at that time. In Dr. Barth's report of his voyage, he wrote that Höba was "a well organized pagan kingdom second to none in Western Sudan". In addition, he did mention that this kingdom "resembles that of ancient Egypt or modern European kingdom. The kingdom was divided into units to which members of the ruling families were sent out to administer as governors". He also mentioned that "Every month, they (the governors and central ministers) sent in reports to the King for further directives or final decisions".

These governors were the Yirmas and the Shalls. There was only one Yirma from Udəng. Since there was and is still just himself, he is simply called Yirma. The governors were in a hierarchy, with the Yirma being the highest of them all, Udəng is the place we now call Udong. The government of Həba is divided into two, with the Təl as the overall ruler. The territorial administration is the responsibility of the Shalls and the Yirma. The central administration is the responsibility of the Təls cabinet members. The cabinet is made up of the following:

1. Yaduma - Yaduma is the Prime Minister and Chief Adviser to the Təl.
2. Bira'ol – Bira'ol is the Assistant Prime Minister
3. Midala – Midala is the Defence Minister and War Commander
4. Kadala – Kadala is the Inspector General of Police. He arrests and orders the arrest of criminals.
5. Dzarma – Dzarma is the Minister in Charge of the Royal Stable
6. Batari – Batari is the Head of Royal Ward
7. Kadagimi – Kadagimi is the Courtier and an official of the King's Palace

=== Relationship between Həba and Fulanis ===
Long after the consolidation of the kingdom we know from general history that the 19th century was characterized by wars due to jihad and incessant skirmishes with the Fulanis in which records inform us that Həba was never ever conquered. Very many attempts were made to do so. Həba, though very war hungry at that time, were only going out to subdue Fulani settlements and take away their assets. Həba never consolidated their war victory anywhere. The approach was very spasmodic too. When it became clear that there was never going to be a conquest between the jihadists and Höba, a truce had to be declared on market days at Pella and at Mbilla Kilba. The Fulanis and Həba attended these market days freely.

== Location ==
The Kilba who live in Hong Local Government Area are situated in the area between five local governments: Gombi, Song, Mubi, Michika all in Adamawa State and Askira Uba Local Government in Borno State . Miss Nissen gives a good description of the location of Kilba area in her book,

== Notable Kilba people ==
- Albatan Yerima Balla – First Republic Member of Parliament and World War 2 veteran
