= Igbo nationalism =

Political ideology related to the Igbo people

The flag of Biafra (1967–1970) is sometimes associated with contemporary Igbo nationalism.

Igbo nationalism is a range of ethnic nationalist ideologies relating to the Igbo people of southeastern Nigeria. While the term is defined as seeking Igbo self-determination by some, others argue that it refers to the preservation and revival of Igbo culture and, for others, the development of Igboland stemming from the philosophy, Aku luo uno, which means "wealth builds the home".

== Self-determination ==
=== Colonial ===
The Igbo people were united into the framework of what is currently known as Nigeria in 1914. Through the process of integration, Igbo sovereignty was limited and often frustrated by the sovereignty of the British colonial power. However, as the practice of colonialism faded in popularity, Igbo intellectuals led the charge in the formation of political parties. The first national party, which was the National Council of Nigerians and Cameroon (NCNC), was founded in 1944 and led by journalist and future president Nnamdi Azikiwe. A man of Igbo descent, Azikiwe was received as a distinctly Igbo figure as opposed to a pan-Africanist or a Nigerian nationalist. Thus, the activities of the NCNC represented the emergence of organized Igbo nationalism a means through which Igbo political interests could be achieved.

Accordingly, the Igbo Federal Union (IFU), which was established in 1936, aligned with the NCNC in order to further extend the reach of the NCNC freedom charter and to delineate a formal agenda across various Igbo organizations. The Igbo Federal Union became the Igbo State Union (ISU) through this merger. Though the formation of an independent state was not mentioned in this charter, Igbo political elites utilized this structure to assert their interests in a highly regionalized struggle for Nigerian independence.

=== Post-colonial ===
Following the success of the independence movement in Nigeria in 1960, the nation remained highly divided across ethnic and regional lines. Following the 1966 anti-Igbo pogrom that took place in the northern and western regions of the nation, many Igbo people fled their ancestral homes in other regions for refuge in the eastern, largely Igbo region of the nation. Within this context of insecurity, the eastern region demanded more autonomy within the broader federal system. The eastern region under military governor Lieutenant Colonel Chukwuemeka Odumegwu Ojukwu engaged in negotiations with the nation's military government under Major General Yakubu Gowon. Through these negotiations, which were delineated in the Aburi Accord, both parties suffered from a difference in interpretation regarding whether the federal military government had transitioned to a confederal military government. After these policies were not instituted, Ojukwu declared independence from the Federal Republic of Nigeria and the establishment of the Republic of Biafra in 1967. Thus began the Nigerian Civil War that lasted from 1967 till 1970 and ended in the dissolution of the attempted republic. (See: Nigerian Civil War and Biafra)

=== Contemporary ===
Igbo people in the present day have noted and lamented the exclusion and marginalization of Igbo politicians from high political office following the aftermath of the civil war. In fact, the last Igbo head of state was Major General Johnson Thomas Umunnakwe Aguiyi Ironsi, the military head of state appointed following the 1966 coup. Additionally, military and political appointments transpiring from 1979 to 2013 have largely overlooked Igbo candidates.

In light of this issue and others, several contemporary Igbo nationalist groups have emerged, offering differing visions of Igbo political autonomy. Groups such as the Movement for the Actualization of the Sovereign State of Biafra (MASSOB) argue for the revitalization of the Biafra project, or a sovereign Igbo state. As opposed to the largely military strategy of the previous era of Igbo nationalism, the group relies on non-violent tactics in its political strategy.

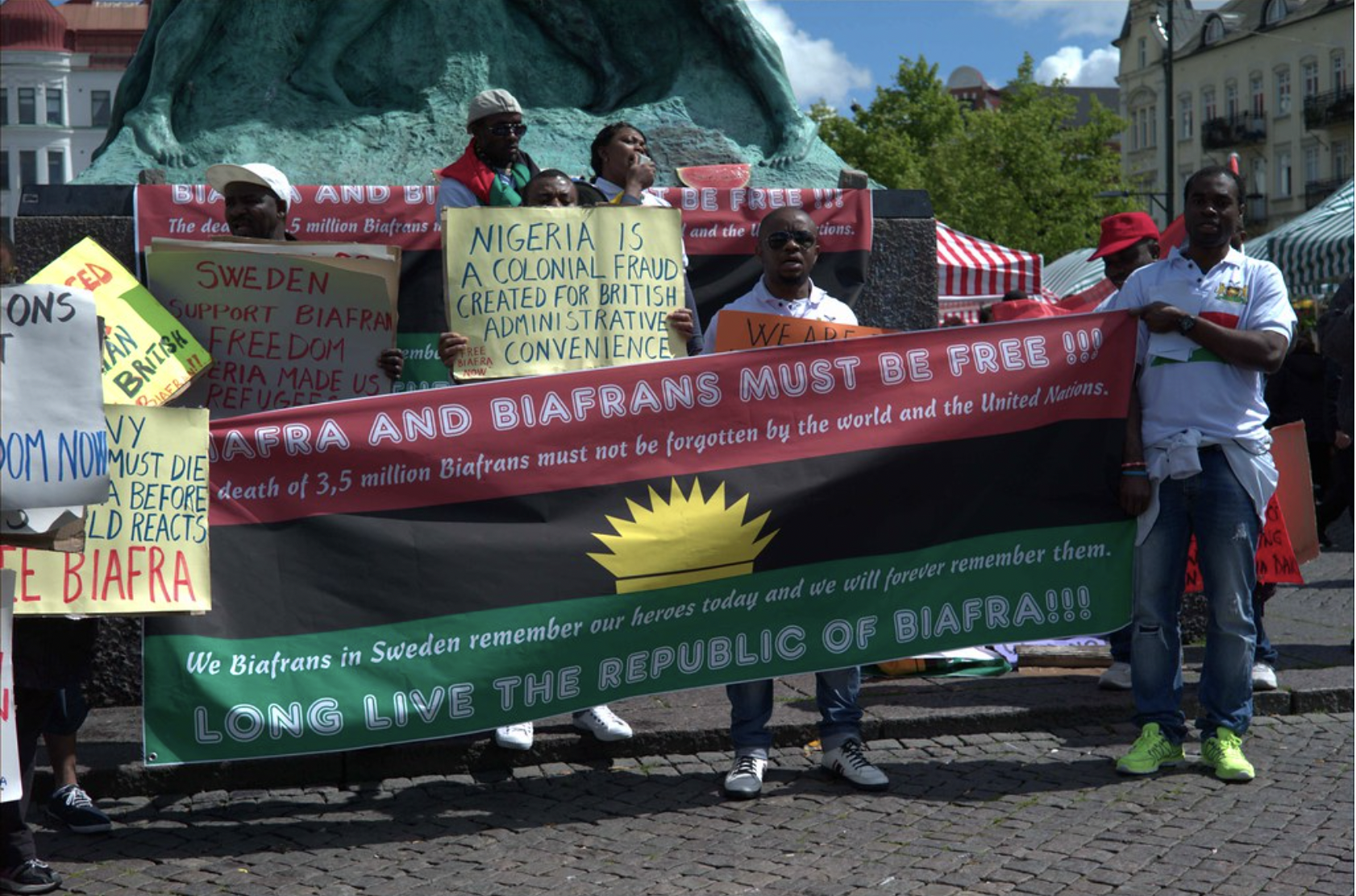
A 2015 Igbo nationalist demonstration in Sweden

== Preservation and revival of Igbo culture ==
=== Colonial ===
Via the divide-and-rule policies embarked upon by Great Britain in its colonization of what is now known as Nigeria, the ethnic groups that occupied the territory were purposefully separated and differentiated. For this reason, the cultural, social, and economic characteristics that distinguished each of the major groups played an important role in public spaces. The Igbo State Union (formerly the Igbo Federal Union) constituted a sociopolitical union that helped solidify an Igbo national consciousness amidst the political background of colonialism and budding nationalism. In the late colonial period that followed WWII, the British colonial government's approach shifted from administrative to developmentalist; thus, civil society groups such as the Igbo State Union became increasingly important for the provision of socio-political and economic advantages. Namely, it enabled the Igbo people to send larger numbers of their children to school via communal association as opposed to the individual achievements or parents.

=== Post-colonial ===
The 1966 anti-Igbo Pogrom and the civil war that followed constituted large threats to the preservation of Igbo culture. Political stability in a newly independent Nigeria— that is, the duration of the First Nigerian Republic— was short lived. Crises such as the Western Region Crisis of 1962, the census crisis of 1963, and the election crisis of 1964-1965 signaled lack of national unity due to interethnic strife. As early as 1964, a small group of majors in the military—mostly Igbo people—began to plot a military coup in 1964 due to their dissatisfaction with the corrupt practices of the federal government. The event came to fruition on January 15, 1966, when Major Emmanuel Arinze Ifeajuna, Major Timothy Onwuatuegwu, Major Christian Anuforo, Major Donatus Okafor, and Major Humphrey Chukwuka overthrew the government under Prime Minister Abubakar Tafawa Balewa and declared martial law over the country. The coup resulted in the deaths of federal officials and political figures such as Prime Minister Abubakar Tafawa Balewa and Premier Ahmadu Bello. Major General Johnson Thomas Umunnakwe Aguiyi Ironsi emerged as the head of state under the military government. Because the majority of targets in the coup were Yoruba or Hausa-Fulani and the leader installed as a result of these events was also Igbo, the coup was characterized as an attempt by the Igbos to seize control of the government. Violence against Igbos began to ensue in the north and spread to the west. Five months after the original coup, a counter-coup ensued which resulted in the death of Ironsi and the installation of Major General Yakubu Gowon. Anti-Igbo violence was not curbed after this transition of power, and Igbo people began to flee to the Eastern region in large numbers. Following the failure of the Aburi Accord, Lieutenant Colonel Chukwuemeka Odumegwu Ojukwu declared the Eastern Region independent for the protection of the lives and interests of the Igbo people. The following Nigerian Civil War began as a police action by Gowon's government to reclaim the area and quickly devolved into a gruesome, large-scale war.

=== Contemporary ===
Due to the civil war conflict resulting in the destruction of the eastern region and the death of millions of Biafrans through military engagements, acts of ethnic cleansing, and starvation, the nationalist movement for the creation of a Biafran state did not reemerge in full-force until 1999. Igbo political elite such as Chief Ralph Uwazuruike formed MASSOB to revitalize Igbo nationalist sentiments based on conceptions of continued injustices against Igbo people. The contemporary reanimation of Igbo nationalism also references the killing of Igbo people by Boko Haram in northern Nigeria as a reason for the reinstitution of the social movement.

MASSOB (which has headquarters across the east and embassies internationally) has been able to leverage the development of an Igbo national consciousness for the promulgation of Biafran ideals. MASSOB has rallied supporters in the southeast and abroad to observe Biafran Day in commemoration of the founding of the Republic of Biafra in 1967. This act, which occurred in 2004 and 2013, contributed to the closure of major shops, banks, and other businesses in eastern states. They also have contributed to the hoisting of Biafra flags in Imo state, Abia state, Enugu state, Ebonyi state, and Anambra state.

== Development of Igboland ==
=== Colonial ===
As intrinsic features of the Igbo social order, communalism and entrepreneurialism pervaded Igbo community structures within the colonial era. This is due in large part to the British colonial institution's imposition of ethnically divisive administrative policies. In the context of colonization, which featured the native population's limited access to economic advantages, there was fierce competition between ethnic groups for employment opportunities. Particularly within coastal southeastern region of the nation, Igbo people's merchant commerce was forced into competition with largely imported industrial commerce and the commercial activities of other groups. Within the context of the Nigerian nationalist movement, these qualities took form in the intra-ethnic competition for national wealth and economic resources. Following the Colonial Development and Welfare Acts put forth the British colonial government in 1945, economic and political power was gradually transferred to native populations— thereby, heightening each group's claims on profitable assets. The Igbo State Union, formerly the Igbo Federal Union, worked alongside the NCNC in ensuring the advancement and welfare of the Igbo people in the furtherance of the Igbo's economic objectives .

=== Post-colonial ===
The Igbo pursuit of enrichment in the post-colonial context continued in the pre-colonial and colonial tradition of the pursuit of community enrichment. A large part of Nigeria's post-colonial capitalist economy relied on the exportation of agricultural products. Because of the poor quality of soil in the predominately Igbo southeastern region, many Igbo people began to migrate into the urban centers of other regions. Due to the Igbo people's relatively high levels of education, they were able to take jobs as clerks, traders, and shopkeepers and eventually rise to the ranks of professionals, journalists, and government employees. The affluence of the migrant Igbo population by way of their employment in northern cities by inspired resentment within the resident population following the events of the 1966 military coup. Many of these Igbo individuals were targeted during the 1966 anti-Igbo pogrom which eventually contributed to the onset of the war.

An important factor in the escalation of the Nigerian Civil War was that 70 percent of the nation's oil reserves were located in the eastern region. In attempts to limit support for the secessionist movement, General Gowon proclaimed that the four states that composed Nigeria would be split further into 12 states, granting ethnic minority groups their own governments. One of these newly formed states was Rivers State, which held both precious oil reserves and major city Port Harcourt. Though Rivers State did not join the secessionist movement, the loss of the remaining Biafran states posed similar economic risks to Nigerian economy and profits for the Biafran economy.

During the civil war, the Igbo people's properties were liquidated and destroyed. After Biafra's surrender, the Nigerian government delegitimized all of Biafra's currency and gave all of its former citizens 20 pounds in exchange for any sum of Biafran pounds.

=== Contemporary ===
The call for the development of Igboland is especially significant considering the lasting effects of the Nigerian Civil War. As a legacy of the conflict, the Igbo people continue to possess significantly smaller amounts of national resources, particularly including oil. The bulk of Nigeria's resources are owned by Yoruba and Hausa individuals. Additionally, Igbo men and women continue to experience anti-Igbo discriminatory attitudes from members of other ethnic groups that affects the success of their businesses. Groups such as Movement for the Actualization of the Sovereign State of Biafra (MASSOB) perceive the Nigerian government's post-war policies as a form of economic strangulation that has persistently limited the economic agency of the Igbo people.

According to their 2002 Constitution, civil society groups such as Ohanaeze Ndigbo have formed to act as a conduit between the government and the people to negotiate for the socio-economic development of Igbo land.

== See also ==
- Biafra
- Flag of Biafra
- Igbo Culture
- Igbo people
- Movement for the Actualization of the Sovereign State of Biafra
- Society for Promoting Igbo Language and Culture
