= Ben Gbulie =

Nigerian soldier and politician

Ben Gbulie was a former Nigerian Army Captain and one of the key players of the 1966 Nigerian coup d'état that overthrew the First Republic government of Sir Alhaji Abubakar Tafawa Balewa. He also fought on the side of Biafra, the breakaway republic, during the Nigerian-Biafran Civil War.

== Early life and career ==
Gbulie was born in Nimo, Njikoka Local Government Area of Anambra State within the former Eastern Region of Nigeria. He joined the Nigerian Army in March, 1960 and was one of the pioneer trainees of the Nigerian Military Training College, Kaduna. He was trained at the Royal Military College, Sandhurst, and the Royal School of Military Engineering, Chatham. Upon completion of his studies, he was deployed to the Nigerian Army Engineering Corps.

== Role in the January 15, 1966 coup ==
Gbulie was an active participant in the January 15, 1966 coup d'état which ousted the First Republic Government of Nigeria. His role in the coup was covered in his book "The Five Majors: coup d'etat of 15th January, 1966". After the coup failed, Gbulie was imprisoned alongside other protagonists of the putsch such as Captain Emmanuel Nwobosi, Major C.K.Nzeogwu, Major Adewale Ademoyega, Major Emmanuel Ifeajuna and many others who participated in the coup. He was released by Ojukwu from the Abakiliki prison and later joined the Biafran side during the ensuing civil war. He served as Military Administrator of the Aba Province during Biafra and was briefly imprisoned by the Nigerian authorities at the end of the war. Gbulie later expressed that the war was unnecessary and was quoted as saying "If we were shot, perhaps there would have been no civil war". His statement referred to the spiralling consequences of their coup, which later crystallised into the civil war.

== Death ==
Gbulie died on January 23, 2022, at the age of 82.
