= Chris Anuforo =

Nigerian military officer (1938–1966)

Christian Igbomba Anuforo
- Born: 1938
- Died: August 1966 (aged 27–28)
- Allegiance: Nigeria
- Branch: Nigerian Army
- Rank: Major
- Education: Royal Military Academy Sandhurst
- Spouse: Henrietta Ada Anuforo

Christian Anuforo (1938 – August 1966) was a Nigerian Army major and one of the principal plotters of the 15 January 1966 coup, an event that derailed Nigeria's nascent democracy and introduced military rule to Nigeria.

== Education ==
Anuforo attended Saint John's College in Kaduna, where he became close friends with Kaduna Nzeogwu. He received his commission in 1961 from the Royal Military Academy, Sandhurst.

== Participation in the 15 January 1966 coup ==
While serving as the staff officer at Army Headquarters, Anuforo along with other majors (Kaduna Nzeogwu, Emmanuel Ifeajuna, Adewale Ademoyega, Don Okafor, Humphrey Chukwuka, Fola Oyewole, O. Olafemiyan, G. Adeleke and Timothy Onwuatuegwu, plotted the overthrow of Abubakar Tafawa Balewa and Nnamdi Azikiwe's government for what the conspirators perceived as the government's corrupt management of Nigeria.

Anuforo was reportedly the most ruthless of the 15 January conspirators and according to the Nigerian Police Special Branch investigation of the coup, Anuforo executed Lt Colonels James Pam, Arthur Unegbe, Colonel Kur Mohammed and Federal Minister of Finance Festus Okotie-Eboh.

== Death ==
In August 1966 some troops (of northern origin) from the 4th battalion at Ibadan, after attending a funeral in Benin, learned that Anuforo and other conspirators were in the Benin prison. The 4th battalion troops then broke into Benin prison to exact revenge for what they perceived as an ethnic based coup that had many northern casualties. Anuforo and other soldiers in detention such as warrant officers James Ogbu and B. Okuge, Sergeants Chukwu, Ogbuhara, and Ndukife, were tortured and killed.
