= Humphrey Chukwuka =

Nigerian military officer

Humphrey Chukwuka is a retired Nigerian Army Major, former Biafran Army Colonel, and one of the principal plotters of the January 15, 1966 coup.

== Career ==
Chukwuka was commissioned into the Nigerian Army after officer cadet training at the Royal Military Academy, Sandhurst in 1960.

== Participation in the January 15, 1966 coup ==
While serving as the Staff Officer at Army Headquarters (specifically Deputy Adjutant-General) under Lt. Col James Pam, the Adjutant-General, Chukwuka along with other Majors (Kaduna Nzeogwu, Emmanuel Ifeajuna, Adewale Ademoyega, Don Okafor, and Timothy Onwuatuegwu) plotted to overthrow the civilian government of Abubakar Tafawa Balewa for what the plotters perceived as corrupt management of Nigeria. Chukwuka supported the Lagos operation of the January 15 coup under the supervision of Major Ifeajuna.

Chukwuka was tasked with arresting his commanding officer (Lt. Col James Pam) and was supported by 2nd Lt. Godwin Onyefuru and Sergeant Donatus Anyanwu. Chukwukaka, Onyefuru, and Anyanwu attacked Pam's Ikoyi Crescent home, shot out his car tires, and abducted Pam who was with his wife Elizabeth. Chukwuka, a regular guest at Pam's home, is said to have assured Elizabeth that Pam would not be harmed. The trio drove to the Brigade Officer's Mess where Major Chris Anufuro, one of the principal coup plotters, confronted and scolded Chukwuka for bringing Pam to the Mess alive. Chukwuka responded to Anufuro that he wasn't prepared to spill any blood and had guaranteed Pam's safety to Pam's wife. Chris Anuforo executed Col. Pam later that evening when he asked Pam to step outside the vehicle and shot him. After the failure of the coup, Chukwuka was detained in the East by General Aguiyi-Ironsi.

== Nigerian Civil War ==
After the outbreak of the Civil War in 1967, Chukwuka was released from prison by Colonel Ojukwu in 1967 and made a Biafran Lt. Colonel. Chukwuka commanded the Task Force that captured Warri during the Biafran Midwest invasion. After the Civil War, he was detained until 1975 when he was released.

== Recent years ==
Chukwuka sought out Mrs. Elizabeth Pam who served on the Human Rights Investigation Panel and apologized for his role in abducting Col. Pam and for his execution.
