= Arthur Unegbe =

Nigerian military officer

Arthur Chinyelu Unegbe was a Nigerian military officer who was QuarterMaster-General, Army Headquarters, Lagos on January 15, 1966, the day of Nigeria's first coup. Unegbe is from Ozubulu a major town in Anambra state.

Unegbe enlisted in the army in 1955, attended Sandhurst and was commissioned a year later along with Patrick Anwunah, Yakubu Gowon, Alexander Madiebo and Mike Okwechime.

He obtained further training at the Pakistan Command and Staff College, Quetta, Pakistan, coursemates of Unegbe included Hilary Njoku and Maimalari. After his return from Pakistan, he became commander of a tactical unit in Kano, the 5th Battalion. The unit was called upon to quell riots caused by partisan agitation in the Benue valley.

== Death ==
Unegbe was murdered in his home in Apapa during the coup operation by Anuforo. He was shot in the presence of his pregnant wife. His corpse was carried to a waiting car by Non-Commissioned junior officers on the orders of Chris Anuforo who had earlier kidnapped Kur Mohammed from his house. Unegbe was the only Igbo military officer killed by the plotters. Differing opinions for his murder arose during and after the civil war. Lieutenant-Colonel Unegbe was responsible for supplies which included weapons, ammunition, vehicle, equipment, clothing, and food for the Army in general. He held no command nevertheless a senior officer who was regarded as unsafe to be kept alive .

On arrival at Unegbe's house, Anuforo entered alone who killed him in the presence of his wife. A reason stated that he was killed because of his refusal to hand over keys of the armory to the plotters, however, writers like Alexander Madiebo who wrote about the coup, proposed that he could not have had keys to the armory but was killed because of his close relationship to Brigadier Maimalari.
