= Samuel Ademulegun =

Nigerian army officer (1924–1966)

- Born: 20 October 1924; Ondo, Southern Region, British Nigeria
- Died: 15 January 1966 (aged 41); Kaduna, Nigeria
- Military career
- Allegiance: British Empire; Nigeria
- Branch: Nigerian Army
- Service years: 1942–1966
- Rank: Brigadier
- Unit: 1st Brigade
- Commands: Nigerian Army 1st Brigade, Kaduna

Brigadier Samuel Adesujo Ademulegun (20 October 1924 – 15 January 1966) was a Nigerian military officer who was the commander of the 1st Brigade of the Nigerian Army during the 1966 Nigerian coup d'état.

== Early life and family ==
He was born on 20 October 1924 in Ondo Town, Western Nigeria, and was considered one of the country's finest officers at the time. The son of Mr. and Mrs. Michael Ademulegun, he had his early education in Ondo state before joining the Nigerian Army as a private in 1942. Ademulegun married Latifat Feyisitan Abike Ademulegun (nee Noble) who was also known as Sisi Nurse.

== Career ==
Ademulegun was commissioned in 1949 and was a member of the senior Officer Corps of the army along with Aguiyi Ironsi, Zakariya Maimalari and Babafemi Ogundipe. He was among those considered for the top army position of GOC in 1965 upon the retirement of the expatriate General Officer Commanding (GOC). He was considered friendly with Ahmadu Bello which brought distaste to some junior officers who frowned at their commander fraternizing with politicians.

== Death ==
Ademulegun and his wife were killed while in bed during the 1966 coup when they were shot by rebels led by Timothy Onwuatuegwu, an instructor at the Nigerian Military Training College. In an eyewitness account of the murder by his daughter, Solape Ademulegun-Agbi, she narrates how her father was killed by military officers. Her account provided details of the invasion and gruesome murder of the former General Officer Commanding (GOC), 1st Division in Kaduna state. Killed in what is considered Nigeria's first coup, the perpetrators are recorded to be ridding the country of corrupt politicians and those who were close to them.

He was survived by his daughter Mrs. Solape Ademulegun-Agbi, Bankole, Kunle, Gbenga, Goke, and his oldest son Frank Bamidele who later enlisted into the Nigerian Air Force where he rose to the rank of Group Captain before he died in 2002.
