= Indian Hemp Decree (Nigeria) =

Nigerian cannabis regulation law

The Indian Hemp Decree (or the Indian Hemp Act) is a Nigerian law which prohibits the growth, production, and sale of plants in the genus cannabis. It was enacted on 31 March 1966 by Major General Aguiyi Ironsi. The act was preceded by the Dangerous Drug Ordinance of 1935, which restricted opium and other drugs.
