= Don Okafor =

Nigerian soldier

Major Donatus Okafor (died July 1966) was a Nigerian army officer, Commander of the Federal Guards Brigade, and one of the principal plotters of the January 15, 1966 coup, an event that derailed Nigeria's nascent democracy and introduced military rule to Nigeria.

== Early life ==
Okafor was born in Kaduna and was fluent in Hausa. His father reportedly had a business in Kano and his mother was a Tiv.

== Career ==
Okafor joined the Nigerian Army as non commissioned officer (NCO) and received short service training at Mons Officer Cadet School in Aldershot, England in 1959.

== Participation in the January 15, 1966 coup ==
As Commander of the Federal Guards Brigade, a unit tasked with providing security to Nigeria's Prime Minister Abubakar Tafawa Balewa, Okafor was critical to the January 15, 1966 coup conspirators considering his intimate knowledge of the Prime Minister's routine. Okafor had a personal relationship with the Prime Minister and was considered a member of Balewa's household.

On the night of January 15, 1966, Major Okafor led Federal Guard soldiers to Brigadier Zakariya Maimalari's residence at Thompson Avenue in Ikoyi. The group was unsuccessful and Maimalari escaped waving down another coup conspirator, Emmanuel Ifeajuna, who unbeknown to Maimalari was in on the conspiracy and was Maimalari's Brigade Major. Emmanuel Ifeajuna and 2nd Lt. Ezedigbo gunned down Maimalari. Author Max Siollun, notes that PM Balewa would have witnessed Maimalari's murder because he had been abducted by Ifeajuna earlier on in the evening.

Okafor was detained in Abeokuta prison by General Aguiyi-Ironsi for his role in the January 15, 1966 coup.

== Death ==
Soldiers of northern origin who mutinied during July Counter Coup broke into Abeokuta prison where Okafor was detained. He was tortured and according to some accounts was buried alive by his attackers.
