= Emmanuel Nwobosi =

Nigerian Army captain

Emmanuel Nwobosi was a Nigerian Army captain and participant in the aborted coup of January 15, 1966, which ousted the government of Sir Alhaji Abubakar Tafawa Balewa. He fought in the Biafran Army against Nigerian forces as a colonel during the Nigerian Civil War which followed after the January coup and the counter-coup of July 29, 1966.

== Early life and career ==
Nwobosi hails from Obosi, Idemili North of Anambra State. He was the chief of staff to Chukwuemeka Odumegwu Ojukwu, the Biafran rebel leader during the Nigerian Civil War. At the end of the war, Nwobosi followed Ojukwu into exile in Ivory Coast.

== Role in coup d'état ==
Nwobosi led the coup in Ibadan in the Western Region and later regrouped in Lagos with Emmanuel Ifeajuna, one of the principal leaders of the putsch. Nwobosi led the mutineers to the houses of Chief Remilekun Fani-Kayode and Chief Samuel Ladoke Akintola. He arrested the former, but when they got to Akintola's house, he resisted arrest and a gun battle ensued. Chief Akintola, the Premier of the Western Region was shot in that exchange. After the coup failed and the conspirators were rounded up by General J.T.U. Ironsi, Nwobosi was detained in Kirikiri Prisons, then moved to Enugu, and then later to Owerri Prisons.

== Death ==
Nwobosi died in 2020 at the age of 82.
