= 1966 Nigerian coup d'état =

Overthrow of the First Nigerian Republic

1966 Nigerian coup d'etat
Date	15–16 January 1966
Location	Nigeria
Result	Coup failed, government overthrown: End of the First Nigerian Republic; Johnson Aguiyi-Ironsi seizes power as Military dictator; Coup conspirators arrested; Beginning of the 1966 anti-Igbo pogrom; 1966 Nigerian counter-coup

Belligerents
Government of Nigeria	Rebel Army Officers

Commanders and leaders
Nnamdi Azikiwe; Nwafor Orizu; Abubakar Balewa X Ahmadu Bello X Samuel Akintola X Festus Okotie-Eboh X Michael Okpara (POW); Johnson Aguiyi-Ironsi	Adewale Ademoyega; Kaduna Nzeogwu (WIA); Emmanuel Ifeajuna; Emmanuel Nwobosi

Strength
Unknown	Unknown

Casualties and losses
22 dead	1 soldier killed

On 15 January 1966, soldiers led by Kaduna Nzeogwu and four others carried out a military putsch, killing 22 people, including Prime Minister Abubakar Tafawa Balewa and Northern Premier Ahmadu Bello, many senior politicians, senior Army officers and their wives, and sentinels on protective duty. The coup plotters attacked the cities of Kaduna, Ibadan, and Lagos while blockading the Niger and Benue River within a two-day timespan, before being overcome by loyalist forces.

Although the coup was considered a failure, it still resulted in a change from an elected government to a military government, albeit led by a different set of senior officers. It also marked the start of a series of military coups in Nigeria. There were no national elections in Nigeria until 1979.

== Background ==
Nigeria, a nation characterized by its ethnic diversity, experienced growing tensions in the post-independence period as various groups began to express concerns over political marginalization and inadequate representation in government. In the 1964 regional elections, Chief Ladoke Akintola emerged as the winner in the Western Region. His victory was widely perceived as being influenced by Northern political interests, with Akintola often described as a proxy for Northern elites.

Allegations of widespread electoral malpractice and vote rigging fueled unrest in the Western Region, where many viewed the results as a sign of Northern dominance over regional affairs. In response, segments of the Western populace engaged in violent protests, including acts of arson and targeted killings. This period of turmoil culminated in the outbreak of "Operation Wetie," a series of politically motivated attacks primarily involving the burning of properties and vehicles associated with political opponents. The violence and instability that followed were among the key factors contributing to the military coup.

By August 1965, the plan for the coup was formed.

A group of Army majors, commonly known as The January Boys (Emmanuel Ifeajuna, Chukwuma Nzeogwu, Timothy Onwuatuegwu, Chris Anuforo, Don Okafor, Humphrey Chukwuka, Emmanuel Nwobosi, Ben Gbulie, and Adewale Ademoyega) began plotting a coup d'état against incumbent Prime Minister Abubakar Balewa.

=== Alleged motivation ===
According to involved plotters, the coup was planned because the men at the helm of Nigeria's affairs were running the country aground with their corrupt ways. Ministers under them were living flamboyant lifestyles and looting public funds at the expense of ordinary citizens.

Furthermore, Captain Ben Gbulie and Colonel Emmanuel Nwobosi, who participated in the coup, later claimed that another reason for the 15 January coup was to counter a "Jihad" that was planned to happen by 17 January.

=== Acting President ===
The president of Nigeria, Nnamdi Azikiwe left the country in late 1965, first for Europe, then on a cruise to the Caribbean. Under the law, the Senate president, Nwafor Orizu, became acting president during his absence and assumed all the powers of the office.

== Coup ==
=== Planning and preparation ===
The planning of the coup began with an inner circle of university-educated young officers who intended a national military revolution by seizing power in the regional capitals of Kaduna (Northern Region) and Ibadan (Western Region), and later taking control of Lagos (Federal Territory).

Nzeogwu oversaw the coup in the Northern Region, with Timothy Onwuatuegwu as a co-commander and Ben Ghulie under their command. At Kaduna they were to eliminate the Northern Premier and the northern political establishment. Nzeogwu began his preparation by organizing a two-day night training exercise called "Operation Damisa" (Operation Tiger) to train soldiers in new fighting techniques. As the Chief Instructor of the Nigerian Military Training College in Kaduna, Nzeogwu was able to organize such exercises without arousing any suspicion. The exercise was approved by authorities of the 1st Brigade Headquarters apparently unaware of the real intentions of Nzeogwu, and the Brigade Major, Alphonso Keshi, had sent circulars to all units operating under the Brigade to contribute troops towards the success of the exercise. By the time Major Keshi realized "Operation Damisa" was actually a military conspiracy, it was too late to counter the operation. At midnight on the 14th of January, the final night of the exercise, Nzeogwu told his officers and men the real purpose of the exercise.

The commander in Lagos was Ifeajuna, and his subordinates were Anuforo, Chukwuka, Ademoyega, and Okafor. Ifeajuna also oversaw the coup in the Western Region at Ibadan, but its execution was carried out by Nwobosi. Ifeajuna codenamed his part of the coup "Operation New Wash" and was responsible for the arrest of prime minister Balewa, Okafor was to arrest GOC Ironsi, Nwobosi to arrest Akintola and Ademoyega was to announce the military takeover at the Nigerian Broadcasting Corporation. The day prior to the coup, Brigadier Maimalari hosted a lavish wedding party at his Ikoyi residence attended by many officers and politicians including Aguiyi Ironsi, Yakubu Gowon and Ifeajuna himself, who served as Maimalari's right hand man. The military was at that time actively deployed in Lagos to police the insecurity in the Western region following the 1965 elections. Ifeajuna and his colleagues used the cover of mobilizing for internal security operations to mobilize men, vehicles, and weapons for their coup.

=== Plot execution ===
In the early hours of 15 January 1966, Nzeogwu led a group of soldiers taking them to attack the official residence of the premier of the north, Ahmadu Bello, where he was assassinated along with his wife. According to a Nigerian Police Special Branch Report, Nzeogwu executed at least four army and police security personnel including one of the men on his team (Sergeant Daramola Oyegoke). Nzeogwu also participated in the execution of Col. Raph Shodeinde, his superior officer at the Nigerian Military Training College. Brigadier Ademulegun and four members of Bello's staff were also killed.

Around the same time in Lagos, Anuforo, assisted by Ademoyega, shot Colonel Kur Mohammed, Finance Minister Okotie-Eboh and Lieutenant-Colonels Pam and Unegbe (the only Igbo officer killed by the plotters). Primer Minister Tafawa Balewa was arrested at his home by Ifeajuna. Ironsi was absent when Okafor's men came to his home. Whereas Maimalari managed to escape from his pursuers, only for him to later be killed when he ran into Ifeajuna's group. In Ibadan, Nwobosi and his team arrested the deputy premier Remi Fani-Kayode and killed Western Premier Samuel Akintola.

From the existing government, the premier of the Eastern region (Michael Okpara), the President and acting President of the Nigerian federation (Nnamdi Azikiwe), and the Army Chief (Johnson Aguiyi-Ironsi), all of whom were Igbos, were notable survivors. Nzeogwu's modus operandi in the North contributed in no small measure to the success of the coup in Northern Nigeria.

After waiting for an early morning radio announcement from Major Adewale Ademoyega in Lagos which did not take place because of the failure of the coup in Lagos, Major Nzeogwu made a mid-afternoon announcement, declaring martial law in Northern Nigeria.

=== Coup failure ===
The plotters had planned to neutralize key government and military figures as well as seize the cities of Kaduna, Ibadan and Lagos, which were major seats of military and government power. However, on the morning of 15 January 1966, at a meeting with some local journalists in Kaduna seeking to find out what was going on, it was brought to Major Nzeogwu's attention that the only information about the events then was what was being broadcast by the BBC. Nzeogwu was surprised because he had expected a radio broadcast of the rebels from Lagos. He is said to have "gone wild" when he learnt that Emmanuel Ifeajuna in Lagos had failed to neutralize Johnson Aguiyi-Ironsi who was the Commander of the Army. Therefore, Nzeogwu hurriedly drafted a speech which was broadcast on Radio Kaduna sometime around 12 a.m. and in which he declared martial law over the Northern Provinces of Nigeria.

=== Power transfer ===
Acting President Nwafor Orizu made a nationwide broadcast, after he had briefed President Nnamdi Azikiwe on the phone about the decision of the cabinet, announcing the cabinet's "voluntary" decision to transfer power to the armed forces. Major General Johnson Aguiyi-Ironsi, who was General Officer Commanding (GOC) of the Nigerian Army, and the senior most officer, then made his own broadcast, accepting the "invitation" to lead the nation.

On 17 January, Major General Ironsi established the Supreme Military Council in Lagos and effectively suspended the constitution.

=== Reactions ===
Initially, the majority of the people across the country were indifferent about the coup, but as more information came forth, different reactions began to build up.

Johnson Aguiyi-Ironsi was accused of being part of the conspiracy while others viewed him as having been compelled to take control of the government of a country in upheaval. Either way, government overthrow put Nigeria's nascent democracy on hold for a long stretch of time.

General Aguiyi-Ironsi's ascendancy to power was deemed to inadvertently be part of the conspiracy of the coup plotters, who were predominantly Igbo Majors to pave the way for an Igbo head of state. Furthermore, Aguiyi-Ironsi had been "invited" to assume power by Nwafor Orizu, the acting president, who was also from the Igbo ethnic group.

The coup was later tagged an "Igbo coup" by other ethnic groups in the country based on the following:

1. The killing patterns – only Arthur Unegbe of the 22 casualties is of Igbo origin, while notable Igbo politicians like the Premier of Eastern region, the senate president Nwafor Orizu (who was convicted for corruption years before) and high ranking military personnel like Aguiyi Ironsi were unharmed.
2. The handing over of the government to Ironsi by Nwafor Orizu (the acting president and the senate president who could have called for the formation of another civilian government) made it look like it was planned out all along.
3. The Unification decree of May 1966 promulgated by Ironsi, leading to the abolition of regional power and the unification of the regional civil service into a federal civil service – Historically speaking, the West and North have always believed in the regional system of government as the best form of government for a multi-ethnic country like Nigeria, however this was taken away by Ironsi, leading to a massive outrage and pogrom in the North in May 1966. This happened a few months before the counter coup by Northern soldiers, which lead to the death of Ironsi, Fajuyi and many officers of Igbo origin.

Other participants of the coup, including Major Ademoyega, a Yoruba man, Captain Ben Gbulie, Colonel Nwobosi, and others later came out to refute the idea that it was an "Igbo coup" through book publications and interviews.

== Aftermath ==
Retaliatory coup by Northern soldiers of the Nigerian Army that led to deaths of many Igbo soldiers and civilians put the nation on a path that eventually led to a civil war.

== Casualties ==
Regarding the casualties, the coup conspirators claimed their purge post-coup targeted members or supporters of the anterior regime and had been targeted for purely political reasons instead of being a racial purge focused on certain ethnic groups or clans; furthermore, they also claimed the list of people targeted was small and composed of only 8 people, half of them foreigners who were to be arrested not killed, and that the casualties had occurred as collateral damage of the coup. These claims were clarified by a member of the trio that formed the coup, Adewale Ademoyega, who published them in Nigeria in 1981 in a book titled Why We Struck outlining their reasons and motivations in which he mentioned:

There was no decision at our meeting to single out any ethnic group for elimination. Our intentions were honourable, our views were national and our goals were idealistic. Even those earmarked for arrest, four were northerners, two were Westerners and two were Easterners.

Below is a comprehensive list of casualties from the coup.

=== Civilians ===
- Prime Minister Abubakar Tafawa Balewa
- Premier Ahmadu Bello
- Premier Samuel Ladoke Akintola
- Finance Minister Festus Okotie-Eboh
- Ahmed Ben Musa (Bello's Senior Assistant secretary for Security)
- Hafsatu Bello (wife of Ahmadu Bello)
- Latifat Ademulegun, wife of General Ademulegun.
- Zarumi Sardauna
- Ahmed Pategi (Bello's driver)

=== Military and police ===
- Brigadier Samuel Ademulegun
- Brigadier Zakariya Maimalari
- Colonel Ralph Shodeinde
- Colonel Kur Mohammed
- Lt. Colonel Abogo Largema
- Lt. Colonel James Pam
- Lt. Colonel Arthur Unegbe
- Sergeant Daramola Oyegoke (Refused Nzeogwu's order in the attack on the Sardauna's lodge and according to the police report was murdered by Nzeogwu.)
- PC Yohana Garkawa
- Lance-corporal Musa Nimzo
- PC Akpan Anduka
- PC Hagai Lai
- Philip Lewande
