= Aburi Accord =

1967 meeting

The Aburi Accord or Aburi Declaration was reached at a meeting between 4 and 5 January 1967 in Aburi, Ghana, attended by delegates of both the Federal Government of Nigeria (the Supreme Military Council) and Eastern delegates led by the Eastern Region's leader Colonel Chukwuemeka Odumegwu-Ojukwu. The meeting was billed as the last chance of preventing all out war. The council collectively vowed not to use force to settle the Nigerian crisis, and also agreed to a law of collective responsibility which vested all powers of the Federal Military Government (FMG) in the Supreme Military Council, making a unanimous concurrence imperative. It was agreed as well, that the Head of the Federal Military Government should assume the title of Commander-in-Chief of the Armed Forces of Nigeria. The atmosphere of the meeting was very cordial saving that Ojukwu did not participate in the humour side of the show. At the end of the meeting, it was agreed that the resolutions of the meeting should be embodied in a Decree to be issued by Lagos with the concurrence of the military Governors.

== Aburi as venue ==
Aburi, Eastern Region of Ghana was chosen as a venue because the eastern delegates led by the Governor of Eastern State Colonel Ojukwu's safety could not be guaranteed anywhere within the western or northern part of the country.

== Agenda of Aburi Meeting ==
- Re-organisation of the Armed forces
- Constitutional Arrangement
- Issue of displaced persons within the Nigeria. (c)1999-2006 Segun Toyin Dawodu

== Delegates ==
The following are the delegates at the Aburi Conference:

- Chairman of the Ghana National Liberation Council -Lt.-General J.A. Ankrah-Chairman
- Lt.-Col. Yakubu Gowon—Head of State
- Lt.-Col. Odumegwu Ojukwu—Governor Eastern Region
- Major Mobolaji Johnson—Governor Lagos State
- Lt.-Col. Hassan Katsina—Governor Northern Region
- Lt.-Col. David Ejoor—Governor Mid-Western Region
- Commodore Joseph Edet Akinwale Wey—Vice President of Nigeria
- Colonel Robert Adebayo—Governor Western Region
- Alhaji Kam Selem—Inspector-General of Police
- Timothy Omo-Bare—Deputy Inspector-General of Police

Secretaries:

- Ntieyong Udo Akpan—Secretary to the Military Governor-East
- Alhaji Ali Akilu—Secretary to the Military Governor-North
- D.P. Lawani—Under Secretary, Military Governor's Office-Mid-West.
- Peter Odumosu—Secretary to the Military Governor-West
- Solomon Akenzua (who later became the Oba of Benin - Erediauwa I)—Permanent Under-Secretary-Federal Cabinet Office

== The Accord ==
What Was AgreedThe Aburi Accord produced several key resolutions: •No use of force to settle Nigeria’s crisis. •Supreme Military Council (SMC) to hold legislative and executive authority, with unanimous concurrence required for national decisions. •Regional autonomy: Military governors would control security in their regions. •Appointments to senior civil service, police, and diplomatic posts required SMC approval. •Collective responsibility: All powers vested in the SMC, not just the federal head. Ojukwu summarized his stance with the phrase: “On Aburi we stand.

”Why the Accord Failed, Different interpretations: •Ojukwu saw Aburi as a move toward confederation (loose union of autonomous regions). •Gowon’s government feared this would weaken central authority. •Federal backtracking: On returning to Lagos, Gowon—under pressure from civil servants and foreign advisers—issued Decree No. 8 (March 1967), which diluted Aburi’s terms, especially on emergency powers and military control. •Breakdown of trust: The Eastern Region viewed this as betrayal. Ojukwu warned that failure to implement Aburi left the East with no choice but “self-help.

”Causes of the War;The Nigerian Civil War (July 1967–January 1970) erupted because:

•Failure to implement Aburi Accord – seen as proof the federal government would not honor agreements. •Mass killings of Igbos in the North – created fear and anger in the East. •Decree No. 8 – centralized power, undermining regional autonomy. •Declaration of Biafra (May 1967) – Ojukwu proclaimed Eastern Nigeria as the independent Republic of Biafra.

== Breakdown ==
In response to the accord, the federal government promulgated Decree No. 8, which was mainly an embodiment of the accord. The accord finally broke down because of differences of interpretation on both sides. This led to the outbreak of Nigerian Civil War. Before the Decree No.8 could finally be issued on March 17, 1967, it had to be passed by the Supreme Military Council meeting which say in Benin on March 10. But Ojukwu did not attend that meeting because he had earlier rejected a draft of that decree which made mockery of the Aburi resolutions. The really offending clauses of the decree were sections 70 and 71 which empowered the Supreme Military Council to declare a state of emergency in Nigeria, if the Head of Federal Military Government and at least three of the Governors agreed to do so. Section 71 also empowered the Head of the Federal Military Government in agreement with at least three Governors to legislate for any particular region whenever they deemed it fit during a state of emergency, with or without the consent of the Governor of that particular Region. In effect, Gowon had thus taken power unto himself to deal with Ojukwu whenever he pleased, how he pleased and as long as he pleased.
