= Emmanuel Ifeajuna =

Nigerian military officer and high jumper (1935–1967)

- Born: 1935; Onitsha, British Nigeria
- Died: 25 September 1967 (aged 31–32); Enugu, Biafra (present-day Nigeria)
- Military career
- Allegiance: Nigeria (1960-67); Biafra (1967)
- Branch: Nigerian Army (Republic of Biafra) Biafran Armed Forces
- Service years: 1960–1967
- Conflicts: 1966 Nigerian coup d'état Nigerian Civil War

Emmanuel Ifeajuna
Medal record

Men's athletics

Representing Nigeria

British Empire and Commonwealth Games
| Gold medal – first place | 1954 Vancouver | High jump |

Emmanuel Arinze Ifeajuna (//; 1935 – 25 September 1967) was a Nigerian military officer and high jumper. He was the first Black African to win a gold medal at an international sports event when he won at the 1954 British Empire and Commonwealth Games. His winning mark and personal best of 6 ft 8 in (2.03 m) was a game record and a British Empire record at the time.

An ethnic Igbo from Onitsha, he was a science graduate of the University College of Ibadan and became involved in politics. He later joined the Nigerian military and played a leading role in the 1966 Nigerian coup d'état.

== Life and career ==
=== High jumping ===
Born in Onitsha, he attended Dennis Memorial Grammar School in his home town and displayed the characteristics that would later define his life. He trained in the high jump under his games teacher, and he also took part in a protest that closed down the school for a term. He graduated from high school in 1951. Ilesa Grammar School also claims him as a past alumnus. This is disputed, although he did do summer school teaching at the institution.

The 1954 Nigerian Athletics Championships saw him establish himself among the nation's best high jumpers. A jump of 6 feet 5.5 inches (1.97 m) meant Ifeajuna was chosen to represent his country at the 1954 British Empire and Commonwealth Games, alongside Nafiu Osagie. Nigeria performed well internationally in the high jump in that period – Joshua Majekodunmi had been runner-up at the 1950 British Empire Games, and three Nigerian jumpers made the top twenty at the 1952 Olympic high jump.

At the 1954 Games in Vancouver, he competed wearing only his left shoe yet managed to clear 6 ft 8 in (2.03 m), which was both a Games record and a British Empire record for the discipline. The resulting gold medal made him the first Black African to win at a major international sports competition. The high jump had an African sweep of the medals that year, with Uganda's Patrick Etolu finishing behind Ifeajuna and Nigeria's Osagie taking third place. Ifeajuna received a hero's welcome upon his return to Lagos and was paraded through the streets before speaking at a civic celebration.

=== Politics and university ===
After his gold medal win, he ceased training in the high jump and did not return to the sport. He enrolled in a science degree at the University College of Ibadan in 1954 and became involved within the institution's student politics movement. He was also a member of the prestigious Sigma Club, University of Ibadan, a socio philanthropic student organization, organizers of the annual Havana Musical Carnival in the institution. While there he became close friends with Christopher Okigbo and J.P. Clark, both of whom would go on to become prominent Nigerian poets. Ifeajuna was also a close friend of Emeka Anyaoku, later Commonwealth Secretary-General. He was deeply involved in Ibadan's Students' Union and became the organisation's Director of Information, encouraging protests. He was affiliated with the Dynamic Party, led by mathematician Chike Obi. Uche Chukwumerije, a contemporary and later a senator, remembered Ifeajuna being active in political agitation, but also claims that he was less willing to be involved in the protests themselves. Clark also attested to this, citing the example of a protest over a student hostel shutdown. The shutdown was prompted by the manslaughter trial of Ben Obumselu, the student union president and friend of Ifeajuna. Ifeajuna organised the protests but was not present during the subsequent clashes.

Upon completion of his science degree he went into teaching, being posted at Ebenezer Anglican Grammar School in Abeokuta. Ifeajuna remained in regular contact with Okigbo, who also went on to teach, and the two continued to discuss revolutionary politics. This culminated in Ifeajuna leaving the teaching profession to join the army in 1960. He underwent training at Mons Officer Cadet School in Aldershot, United Kingdom. As a graduate, he rose quickly within the military ranks and reached the position of Major in January 1966. He was the brigade major in Lagos.

=== Coup attempt ===
Dissatisfied with the direction his country had taken during the First Nigerian Republic under Prime Minister Abubakar Tafawa Balewa, Ifeajuna became a conspirator in a plot to overthrow the government. Given his studies, Ifeajuna has been regarded as one of the intellectual drivers of the conspiracy and he wrote an unpublished manuscript on the reasoning for the 1966 Nigerian coup d'état attempt. He scorned the corruption and anarchy that resulted from mismanagement of the government. Major Chukwuma Kaduna Nzeogwu was the face of the coup attempt, which involved five other army majors: Timothy Onwuatuegwu, Chris Anuforo, Adewale Ademoyega and Humphrey Chukwuka.

Ademoyega, Okafor, Anuforo and Chukwuka were the other majors based in Lagos, where Ifeajuna led movements. Ifeajuna led his brigade to the house of Prime Minister Balewa and arrested him. Meanwhile, Nzeogwu made public the names of who the coup aimed to kill and Balewa as a notable absence. Okafor sought to capture Brigadier Zakariya Maimalari, Ifeajuna's commanding officer. Maimalari escaped and upon finding Ifeajuna asked him for help. Ifeajuna killed Maimalari, which led to dissension among Ifeajuna's ranks, as he was a highly respected officer. Ifeajuna also shot Lieutenant Colonel Abogo Largema at a hotel in the Ikoyi district of Lagos.

One of the coup's prominent targets, Major-General Johnson Aguiyi-Ironsi, caught wind of the plot and escaped capture. He then began to move against the coup conspirators. Ironsi eventually managed to prevent the coup and was later appointed to take over leadership and bring stability to the country. During these events, Prime Minister Balewa died while under the arrest of Ifeajuna. Official police reports into the circumstances of his death (which remain redacted) claim Ifeajuna shot Balewa while driving to Abeokuta and abandoned the body by the road. Some claim that Balewa was not deliberately killed (given that he was not one of the coup's stated assassination targets), but rather died of an asthma or heart attack during the ordeal. This subject remains an unresolved element of the history of the 1966 coup attempt.

=== Execution and legacy ===
Following Ironsi's move against the coup, Ifeajuna's friend Christopher Okigbo helped him cross the border into Dahomey (now Benin) and through to Ghana where he was welcomed by its leader Kwame Nkrumah. Nkrumah's regime was overthrown shortly afterwards and Ifeajuna returned to Nigeria after assurances from Emeka Ojukwu that his life would not be at risk. He again became involved in the military, this time within the Biafran Army – the Republic of Biafra declared its secession from Nigeria, beginning the Nigerian Civil War. Ifeajuna, Victor Banjo, Phillip Alale and Sam Agbam were accused by Ojukwu of negotiating with the federal Nigerian officials, via British agents, hoping to bring about a ceasefire, overthrow Ojukwu, and gain prominent positions for themselves. They were hastily tried and sentenced to death by firing squad for treason. Ifeajuna claimed the plan was to preserve civilian life in Enugu from an oncoming assault by federal troops. Ifeajuna and his three co-conspirators were executed on 25 September 1967. Enugu, the Biafran capital, was captured by federal Nigerian forces two days later.

Ifeajuna has had a mixed legacy. His unpublished manuscript has attracted much attention, including that of Olusegun Obasanjo, an army general and now former President of Nigeria. The 1966 coup attempt is seen by many as an Igbo plot, although conspirators included non-Igbos, some coup targets were Igbos, and General Ironsi who prevented the coup was himself an Igbo. The manuscript is seen as a possible historical source for assessing both the racial element to the coup and Ifeajuna's role in it, which ranges from co-conspirator to intellectual leader.

Ifeajuna has not featured prominently or favourably in the history of the Nigerian Civil War. While fellow 1966 coup maker Chukwuma Kaduna Nzeogwu has been decorated as a war hero and had a statue erected in his hometown, Ifeajuna has received little posthumous recognition, even when calls were made for him to be honoured posthumously. Upon his death in 2011, former Biafran leader Ojukwu received the highest military accolades from Nigeria and his funeral was attended by the Nigerian President Goodluck Jonathan In a 1992 interview, Ojukwu dismissed claims that Chukwuma Kaduna Nzeogwu was the leader of the plot, as was widely believed. A Nigerian Police Special Branch report, its first part partially redacted and the second part missing, stated that Ifeajuna, Don Okafor and Captain Ogbu Oji were the creators and protagonists of the coup plot in 1965, with Nzeogwu only becoming involved at a late stage. Ifeajuna is seen by some as the assassin of Prime Minister Balewa, which brought down the First Republic and caused civil war. No autopsy was carried on Balewa's body and no proof exists that he was shot. Official reports document his body was found in a sitting position by a tree, next to the body of finance minister Festus Okotie-Eboh, who had been shot and was at the centre of corruption allegations.

Ifeajuna's legacy within Black African sports history has been overshadowed by his political actions following his feats.

== Personal life ==
During his time at university, Ifeajuna met his wife Rose in 1955. Four years later the pair married and went on to have two sons.

== International competition record ==
| Year | Competition | Venue | Position | Event | Notes |
|---|---|---|---|---|---|
| 1954 | British Empire and Commonwealth Games | Vancouver, Canada | 1st | High jump | 6 ft 8 in (2.03 m) |
