= Operation Wetie =

Crisis in Nigeria

Operation Wet ẹ (English: wet him/her) was a violent protest that took place in Western Nigeria between violent political factions, the Hausa-Fulani natives and some members of the Nigerian National Democratic Party during the First Republic. Although it began in 1962, it essentially set in motion a chain of events that eventually led to the first military coup in Nigeria on 15 January 1966. While some argue that, the coup has nothing to do with the 1962 election that led to Operation Wet ẹ, that the coup was entirely ambition of the Igbo extraction of the military, hijacking of government from the central and took over when the opportunity came, in order to unify the regions into single control from the centralized system.

The term "Operation Wet ẹ" was coined from the setting ablaze of politicians and their properties with petrol, with many victims of the political violence killed by "necklacing." During the early 1960s, violence was on a rapid rise in the political system of Nigeria which led to the introduction of Operation Wetie whereby political gangs were used to disrupt elections.

Operation Wet ẹ was significantly used in 1962 when Chief Ladoke Akintola and Chief Obafemi Awolowo were embroiled in a protracted battle for supremacy, thus leading to a high rate of violence and acts of lawlessness - with lawmakers engaging themselves in vicious physical combat in the Western regional parliament.
