= Yakubu Gowon =

Military Head of State of Nigeria from 1966 to 1975 (born 1934)

General Yakubu Gowon GCFR
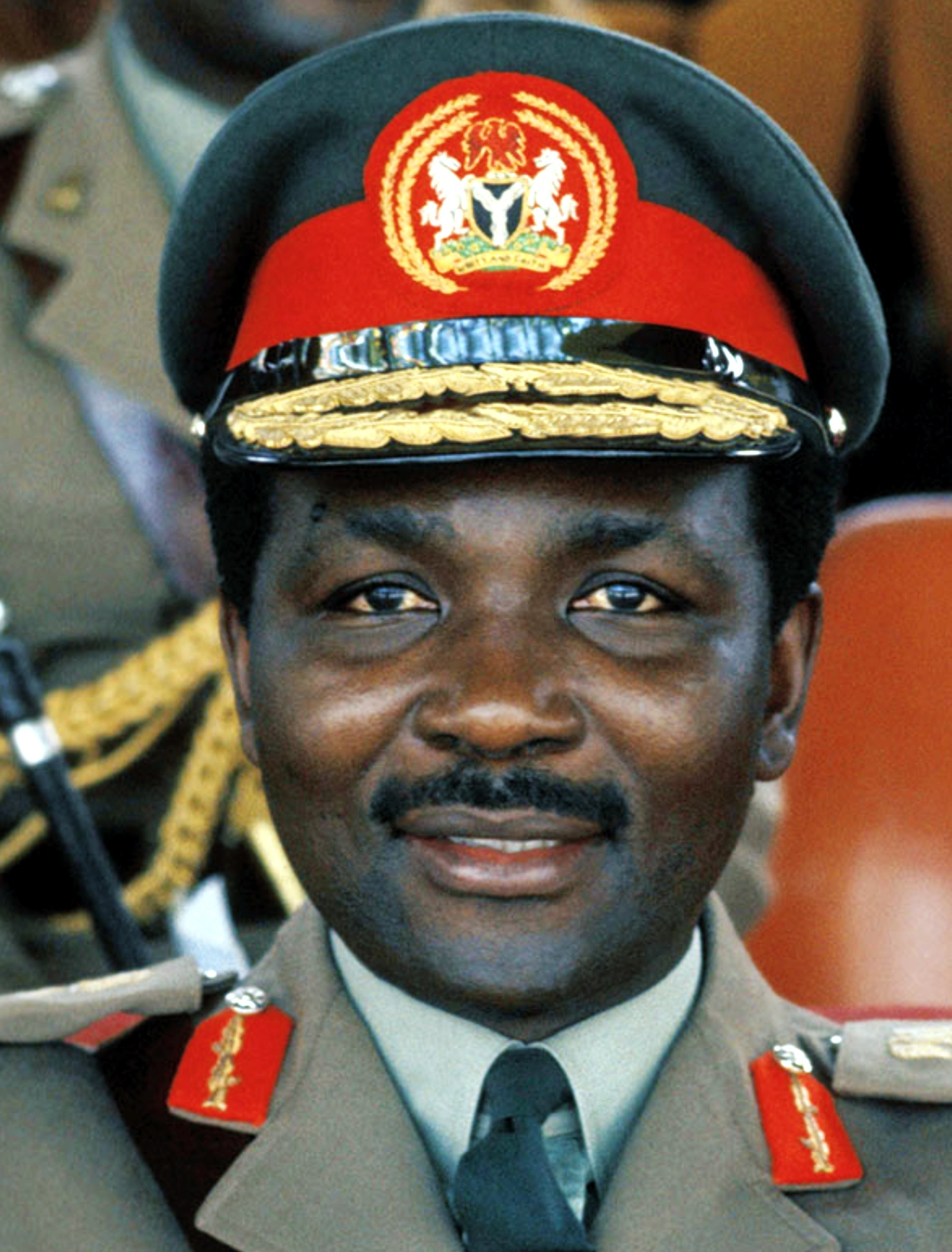
- Gowon in 1970

3rd Head of State of Nigeria and 2nd Head of the Federal Military Government
- In office 1 August 1966 – 29 July 1975
- Chief of Staff: J. E. A. Wey
- Preceded by: Johnson Aguiyi-Ironsi
- Succeeded by: Murtala Mohammed

Chairperson of the Organisation of African Unity
- In office 27 May 1973 – 12 June 1974
- Preceded by: Hassan II
- Succeeded by: Siad Barre

Federal Commissioner of Defence
- In office 1966–1975
- President: Himself
- Preceded by: Inuwa Wada
- Succeeded by: Illiya Bisalla

Federal Commissioner for External Affairs
- In office 1966–1967
- Preceded by: Nuhu Bamalli
- Succeeded by: Arikpo Okoi

Chief of Army Staff
- In office 16 January 1966 – 29 July 1966
- Preceded by: Johnson Aguiyi-Ironsi
- Succeeded by: Joseph Akahan

Personal details
- Born: 19 October 1934 (age 91) Kanke, Colony and Protectorate of Nigeria (now Kanke, Plateau, Nigeria)
- Spouse: Victoria Zakari (m. 1969)
- Education: Barewa College; Royal Military Academy Sandhurst; Staff College, Camberley; Joint Staff College, Latimer; University of Warwick
- Occupation: Military officer; professor
- Nickname: "Jack"

Military service
- Allegiance: Nigeria
- Branch/service: Nigerian Army
- Years of service: 1954–1975
- Rank: General
- Battles/wars: Congo Crisis; Nigerian Civil War

Yakubu Dan'juma "Jack" Gowon GCFR (Hausa pronunciation; born 19 October 1934) is a Nigerian general and statesman who served as the military head of state of Nigeria from 1966 to 1975.

Gowon was Nigeria's leader during the Nigerian Civil War, also known as the Biafra War where he delivered the famous "no victor, no vanquished" speech at the war's end to promote healing and reconciliation. The Nigerian Civil War is listed as one of the deadliest in modern history, with some accusing Gowon of crimes against humanity and genocide. Gowon has maintained that he committed no wrongdoing during the war and that his leadership saved the country.

An Anglican Christian from a minority Ngas ethnic group of Northern Nigeria, Gowon is a Nigerian nationalist, and a believer in the unity and oneness of Nigeria. His rise to power followed the July 1966 counter-coup and cemented military rule in Nigeria. Consequently, Gowon served for the longest continuous period as head of state of Nigeria, ruling for almost nine years until his overthrow in the coup d'état of 1975 by Brigadier Murtala Mohammed.

== Early life ==
Gowon is an Ngas (Angas) from Lur, a small village in the present Kanke Local Government Area of Plateau State. His parents, Nde Yohanna and Matwok Kurnyang, left for Wusasa, Zaria, as Church Missionary Society (CMS) missionaries in the early days of Gowon's life. His father took pride in the fact that he married on 26 April 1923, the same day as the wedding of Prince Albert and Lady Elizabeth Bowes-Lyon (later King George VI and Queen Elizabeth The Queen Mother). Gowon was the fifth of eleven children. He grew up in Zaria and had his early life and education there. At school, Gowon proved to be a remarkable athlete: he was the school football goalkeeper, pole vaulter, and long-distance runner. He broke the school mile record in his first year. He was also the boxing captain.

== Early career ==
Gowon joined the Nigerian Army in 1954 and received his commission as a second lieutenant on 19 October 1955, his 21st birthday. He was trained in the prestigious Royal Military Academy Sandhurst, UK (1955–56), Staff College, Camberley, UK (1962) as well as the Joint Staff College, Latimer, 1965. He saw action in the Congo as part of the United Nations Peacekeeping Force, both in 1960–61 and in 1963. He advanced to battalion commander position by 1966, at which time he was still a lieutenant colonel.

== 1966 coup ==
In January 1966, he became Nigeria's youngest military chief of staff at the age of 31, because a military coup d'état by a group of junior officers under Major Chukwuma Kaduna Nzeogwu led to the overthrow of Nigeria's civilian government. In the course of this coup, mostly northern and western leaders were killed, including Sir Abubakar Tafawa Balewa, Nigeria's Prime Minister; Sir Ahmadu Bello, Sardauna of Sokoto and Premier of the Northern Region; and Samuel Akintola, Premier of the Western Region, Lt Col Arthur Unegbe and so many more. The then Lieutenant Colonel Gowon returned from his course at the Joint Staff College, Latimer UK two days before the coup – a late arrival that possibly exempted him from the plotters' hit list. The subsequent failure by Major General Johnson Aguiyi-Ironsi (who was the head of state following the January 1966 coup-with Gowon his Chief of Staff) to meet Northern demands for the prosecution of the coup plotters further inflamed Northern anger. There was significant support for the coup plotters from both the Eastern Region as well as the mostly left-wing "Lagos-Ibadan" press.

== July counter coup ==
Then came Aguyi Ironsi's Decree Number 34, which proposed the abolition of the federal system of government in favor of a unitary state, a position which had long been championed by some Southerners-especially by a major section of the Igbo-dominated National Council of Nigeria and the Cameroon (NCNC) This was perhaps wrongly interpreted by Northerners as a Southern (particularly Igbo) attempt at a takeover of all levers of power in the country. The North lagged badly behind the Western and Eastern regions in terms of education (partially due to Islamic doctrine-informed resistance to western cultural and social ethos), while the mostly-Igbo Easterners were already present in the federal civil service.

The original intention of Murtala Mohammed and his fellow coup-plotters was to engineer the secession of the Northern region from Nigeria as a whole, but they were subsequently dissuaded of their plans by several advisors, amongst which were a number of high-ranking civil servants and judges, and importantly emissaries of the British and American governments who had interests in the Nigerian polity. The young officers then decided to name Lieutenant Colonel Gowon, who apparently had not been actively involved in events until that point, as Nigerian Head of State. On ascent to power Gowon reversed Ironsi's abrogation of the federal principle.

== Head of state ==
In 1966, Gowon was chosen to become head of state. Up until then, Gowon remained strictly a career soldier with no involvement whatsoever in politics, until the tumultuous events of the year suddenly thrust him into a leadership role, when his unusual background as a Northerner who was neither of Hausa nor Fulani ancestry nor of the Islamic faith made him a particularly safe choice to lead a nation whose population was seething with ethnic tension.

Gowon promoted himself twice as Nigerian Head of State. Gowon was a Lt. Colonel upon his ascendancy to the top of the new Federal military government of Nigeria on 1 August 1966, however other senior military officers such as Commodore Joseph Wey, Brigadier Babafemi Ogundipe, and Colonel Robert Adebayo were a part of the government and their military seniority to Gowon was awkward. To stabilize his position as Head of State, Gowon promoted himself to Major-General just before the start of the civil war hostilities in 1967 and to full General at the end of the civil war in 1970.

== Civil war leader ==
In anticipation of eastern secession, Gowon moved quickly to weaken the support base of the region by decreeing the creation of twelve new states to replace the four regions. Six of these states contained minority groups that had demanded state creation since the 1950s. Gowon rightly calculated that the eastern minorities would not actively support the Igbos, given the prospect of having their own states if the secession effort were defeated. Many of the federal troops who fought in the Nigerian Civil War, also known as the Biafran War, to bring the Eastern Region back to the federation, were members of minority groups.

The war lasted thirty months and ended in January 1970. In accepting Biafra's unconditional cease-fire, Gowon declared that there would be no victor and no vanquished. In this spirit, the years afterward were declared to be a period of rehabilitation, reconstruction, and reconciliation. The oil-price boom, which began as a result of the high price of crude oil (the country's major revenue earner) in the world market in 1973, increased the federal government's ability to undertake these tasks.

There arose tension between the Eastern Region and the northern controlled federal government led by Gowon. On 4–5 January 1967, in line with Biafran leader Chukwuemeka Odumegwu Ojukwu's demand to meet for talks only on neutral soil, a summit attended by Gowon, Ojukwu and other members of the Supreme Military Council was held at Aburi in Ghana, the stated purpose of which was to resolve all outstanding conflicts and establish Nigeria as a confederation of regions. The outcome of this summit was the Aburi Accord. The Aburi Accord did not see the light of the day, as the Gowon led government had huge consideration for the possible revenues, especially oil revenues which were expected to increase given that reserves having been discovered in the area in the mid-1960s. It has been said without confirmation that both Gowon and Ojukwu had knowledge of the huge oil reserves in the Niger Delta area, which today has grown to be the mainstay of the Nigerian economy.

Midwest invasion of 1967

In a move to check the influence of Ojukwu's government in the East, Gowon announced on 5 May 1967 the division of the three Nigerian regions into 12 states: North-Western State, North-Eastern state, Kano State, North-Central State, Benue-Plateau State, Kwara State, Western State, Lagos State, Mid-Western State, and, from Ojukwu's Eastern Region, a Rivers State, a South-Eastern State, and an East-Central State. The non-Igbo South-Eastern and Rivers states which had the oil reserves and access to the sea, were carved out to isolate the Igbo areas as East-Central state. One controversial aspect of this move was Gowon's annexing of Port Harcourt, a large city in the Niger Delta, in the South of Nigeria (the Ikwerres and Ijaws), sitting on some of Nigeria's largest reserves, into the new Rivers State, emasculating the migrant Igbo population of traders there. The flight of many of them back to their villages in the "Igbo heartland" in Eastern Nigeria where they felt safer was alleged to be a contradiction for Gowon's "no victor, no vanquished" policy, when at the end of the war, the properties they left behind were claimed by the Rivers State indigenes.

Towards the end of July 1967, Nigerian federal troops and marines captured Bonny Island in the Niger Delta, thereby taking control of vital Shell-BP facilities. Operations began again in May 1968, when Nigeria captured Port Harcourt. Its facilities had been damaged and needed repair. Oil production and export continued, but at a lower level. The completion in 1969 of a new terminal at Forçados brought production up from 142,000 barrels/day in 1958 to 540,000 barrels/day in 1969. In 1970, this figure doubled to 1.08 million barrels/day.

Minority ethnicities of the Eastern Region were rather not sanguine about the prospect of secession, as it would mean living in what they felt would be an Igbo-dominated nation. Some non-Igbos living in the Eastern Region either refrained from offering active support to the Biafran struggle, or actively aided the federal side by enlisting in the Nigerian army and feeding it intelligence about Biafran military activities. However, some did play active roles in the Biafran government, with N.U. Akpan serving as Secretary to the Government, Lt. Col (later Major-General) Philip Effiong, serving as Biafra's Chief of Defence Staff and others like Chiefs Bassey and Graham-Douglas serving in other significant roles.

On 30 May 1967, Ojukwu responded to Gowon's announcement by declaring the formal secession of the Eastern Region, which was now to be known as the Republic of Biafra. This was to trigger a war that would last some 30 months, and see the deaths of more than 100,000 federal soldiers and three million Biafran combatants and civilians, most of the latter of which perished through starvation under a Nigerian-imposed blockade. The war saw a massive expansion of the Nigerian Army in size and a steep increase in its doctrinal and technical sophistication, while the Nigerian Air Force was essentially born in the course of the conflict. However, significant controversy has surrounded the air operations of the Nigerian Forces, as several residents of Biafra, including Red Cross workers, foreign missionaries and journalists, accused the Nigerian Air Force of specifically targeting civilian populations, relief centers and marketplaces. Gowon has steadfastly denied those claims, along with claims that his army committed atrocities such as rape, wholesale executions of civilian populations and extensive looting in occupied areas; however, one of his wartime commanders, Benjamin Adekunle seems to give some credence to these claims in his book, while excusing them as unfortunate by-products of war.

== "No victor, no vanquished" ==
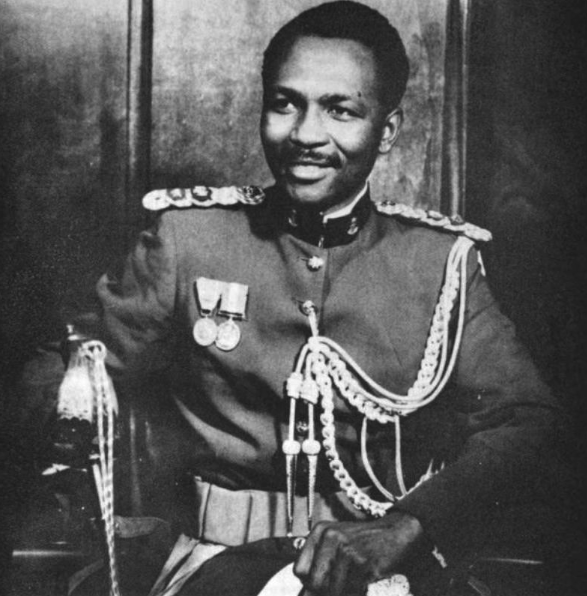
Gowon in 1966

The end of the war came about on 13 January 1970, with Colonel Olusegun Obasanjo's acceptance of the surrender of Biafran forces. The next day, Obasanjo announced the situation on the former rebel radio station Radio Biafra Enugu. Gowon subsequently made his famous "no victor, no vanquished" speech, and followed it up with an amnesty for the majority of those who had participated in the Biafran uprising, as well as a program of "Reconciliation, Reconstruction, and Rehabilitation", to repair the extensive damage done to the economy and infrastructure of the Eastern Region during the years of war. Some of these efforts never left the drawing board. In addition to this, Gen. Gowon's administration's policy of leaving only 20 pounds for Biafrans who had a bank account in Nigeria before the war, regardless of how much money had been in their account, was criticised by foreign and local aid workers, as this led to an unprecedented scale of begging, looting and robbery in the former Biafran areas after the war.

Another decision made by Gowon at the height of the oil boom was to have what some considered negative repercussions for the Nigerian economy in later years, although its immediate effects were scarcely noticeable – his indigenization decree of 1972, which declared many sectors of the Nigerian economy off-limits to all foreign investment, while ruling out more than minority participation by foreigners in several other areas. This decree provided windfall gains to several well-connected Nigerians but proved highly detrimental to non-oil investment in the Nigerian economy.

The post-civil-war years saw Nigeria enjoying a meteoric, oil-fuelled, economic upturn in the course of which the scope of activity of the Nigerian federal government grew to an unprecedented degree, with increased earnings from oil revenues. However, this period also saw a rapid increase in corruption, mostly bribery, of and by federal government officials; and although the head of State himself, Gen. Gowon, was never found complicit in the corrupt practices, he was often accused of turning a blind eye to the activities of his staff and cronies.

On 1 October 1974, in flagrant contradiction to his earlier promises, Gowon declared that Nigeria would not be ready for civilian rule by 1976, and he announced that the handover date would be postponed indefinitely. Furthermore, because of the growth in bureaucracy, there were allegations of rise in corruption. Increased wealth in the country resulted in fake import licenses being issued. There were stories of tons of stones and sand being imported into the country, and of General Gowon himself saying to a foreign reporter that "the only problem Nigeria has is how to spend the money she has."

== The cement armada affair ==
The corruption in Gowon's administration culminated in the notorious "cement armada" affair in the summer of 1975, when the port of Lagos became jammed with hundreds of ships trying to unload cement. Somehow, agents of the Nigerian government had signed contracts with 68 different international suppliers for the delivery of a total of 20 million tons of cement in one year to Lagos, even though its port could only accept one million tons of cargo per year. Even worse, the poorly drafted cement contracts included demurrage clauses highly favorable to the suppliers, meaning that the bill began to skyrocket if the ships sat in port waiting to unload (or even if they sat in their home ports waiting for permission to depart for Nigeria). The Nigerian government did not fully grasp the magnitude of its mistake until the port of Lagos was so badly jammed that basic supplies could not get through. By that time it was too late. Its attempts to repudiate the cement contracts and impose an emergency embargo on all inbound shipping tied up the country in litigation around the world for many years, including a 1983 decision of the U.S. Supreme Court.

== Overthrow ==
These scandals provoked serious discontent within the army. On 29 July 1975, while Gowon was attending an OAU summit in Kampala, a group of officers led by Colonel Joe Nanven Garba announced his overthrow. The coup plotters appointed Brigadier Murtala Muhammed as head of the new government, and Brigadier Olusegun Obasanjo as his deputy.

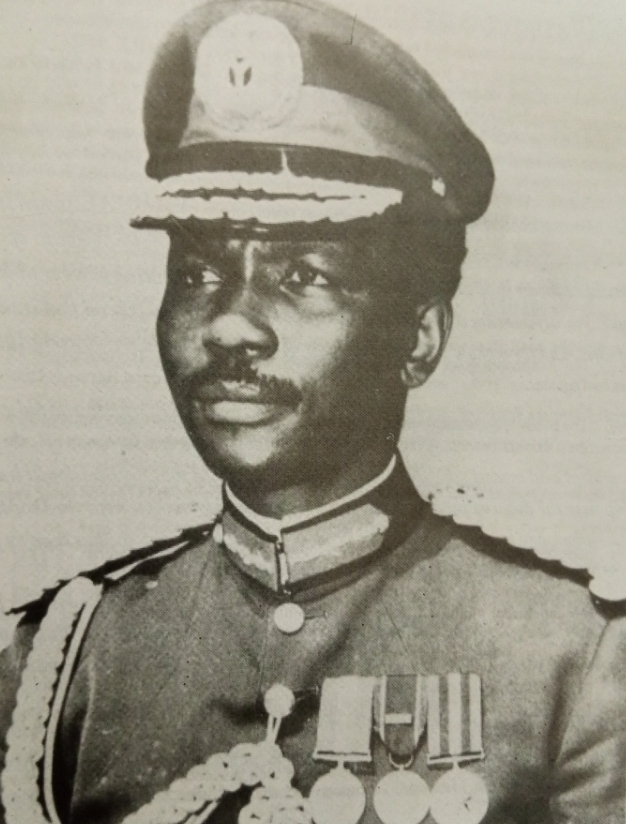
As a soldier

== Years in exile ==
Gowon subsequently went into exile in the United Kingdom, where he acquired a Ph.D. in political science as a student at the University of Warwick. His main British residence is on the border of north London and Hertfordshire, where he has very much become part of the English community in his area. He served a term as Churchwarden in his parish church, St Mary the Virgin, Monken Hadley.

== Murtala's assassination ==
In February 1976, Murtala Mohammed was assassinated in an unsuccessful coup d'état led by Lt. Col Buka Suka Dimka, who implicated Gowon. According to Dimka's "confession", he met with Gowon in London and obtained support from him for the coup. In addition, Dimka mentioned before his execution that the purpose of the coup d'état was to re-install Gowon as head of state. As a result of the coup tribunal findings, Gowon was declared wanted by the Nigerian government, stripped of his rank in absentia, and had his pension cut off.

Gowon was finally pardoned, along with the ex-Biafran president, Emeka Ojukwu, during the Second Republic under President Shehu Shagari. Gowon's rank of general was not restored until 1987 however by General Ibrahim Babangida.

== Later life ==
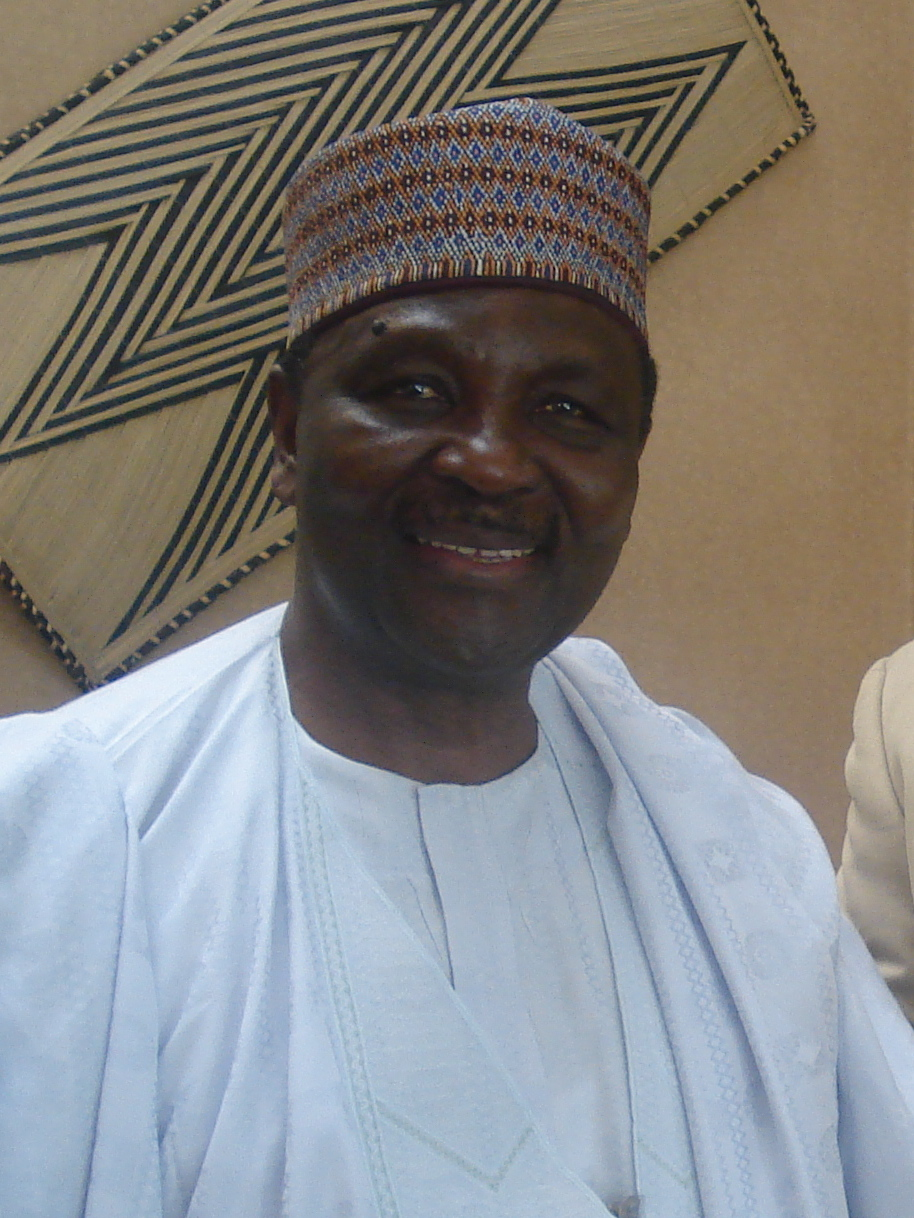
Gowon in 2007

After earning his doctorate at the University of Warwick, Gowon became a professor of political science at the University of Jos in the mid-1980s. Gowon founded his own organization in 1992 called the Yakubu Gowon Centre. The organization is said to work on issues in Nigeria such as good governance as well as infectious disease control including HIV/AIDS, guinea worm, and malaria. Furthermore, Gen. Gowon is also involved in the Guinea Worm Eradication Programme as well as the HIV Programme with Global Fund of Geneva.

In November 2020, MP Tom Tugendhat, while speaking against the Nigerian government's repression of the 2020 #EndSARS mass protests, accused Gowon of looting "half of the Central Bank of Nigeria" after his overthrow in the coup d'état of 1975. The statement, the first-ever attempt to link Gowon with corruption, was faced with considerable backlash within Nigeria, with Bishop Matthew Kukah writing in the national major Daily Trust describing the seemingly ridiculous comment as "It is difficult to understand how a Member of the revered British Parliament worth his salt, could have left himself open to ridicule by leveling the unfounded, irrational and bizarre allegations of corruption against General Yakubu Gowon, our former Head of State and to the hilt, the nation's poster face of probity in public life." Following an official demand for an apology by the Nigerian government, the Foreign Office later disassociated itself from the comment stating that, "the said comment of the MP does not reflect the views of Her Majesty's Government and the British Government has no mechanism for controlling the actions and speeches of members of the Parliament."

In February 2024, Gowon, who is the last surviving founder of the Economic Community of West African States (ECOWAS), called on the bloc to lift sanctions against Mali, Burkina Faso and Niger, whose military-led governments had announced their countries' departure from the organization in response to the sanctions.

== Personal life ==
Gowon married Victoria Zakari, a trained nurse in 1969 at a ceremony officiated by Seth Irunsewe Kale at the Cathedral Church of Christ, Lagos.

== See also ==
- Nigerian Civil War
- Nigerian military juntas of 1966–79 and 1983–99

Military offices
Preceded by Johnson Aguiyi-Ironsi	Head of the Federal Military Government of Nigeria; 1 August 1966 – 29 July 1975	Succeeded by Murtala Mohammed
Political offices
Preceded by Nuhu Bamalli	Federal Commissioner for External Affairs; 1966 – 1967	Succeeded by Arikpo Okoi
Preceded by Inuwa Wada	Federal Commissioner of Defence; 1966 – 1975	Succeeded by Illiya Bisalla
