= Chukwuma Nzeogwu =

Nigerian military officer and revolutionary

- Born: Patrick Chukwuma Nzeogwu; 26 February 1937; Kaduna, British Nigeria
- Died: 29 July 1967 (aged 30); Near Nsukka, Nigeria
- Burial place: Kaduna
- Education: Royal Military Academy Sandhurst
- Military career
- Allegiance: British Empire (1957–1960); Nigeria (1960–1966); Biafra (1967)
- Branch: Nigerian Army (Republic of Biafra) Biafran Army
- Service years: 1957–1967
- Rank: Lieutenant-Colonel
- Nickname: "Kaduna"
- Conflicts: Congo Crisis; Nigerian Civil War
- Nzeogwu's voice from an interview, 16 January 1966

Lieutenant-Colonel Patrick Chukwuma "Kaduna" Nzeogwu (26 February 1937 – 29 July 1967) was a Nigerian military officer who played a leading role in the 1966 Nigerian coup d'état, which overthrew the First Nigerian Republic.

== Early life ==
Patrick Chukwuma Nzeogwu was born on 26 February 1937 in Kaduna, Colonial Nigeria. The city was the capital of the Northern Region at the time. Born into an Anioma family, he attended two Christian schools in Kaduna for his elementary and secondary education, the Saint Joseph's Catholic Primary School and the Saint John's College. At Saint John's College, Nzeogwu became close friends with Christian Anufuro.

In March 1957, Nzeogwu enlisted as an officer-cadet in the Nigeria Regiment of the Royal West African Frontier Force and proceeded on a 6-month preliminary training in the Gold Coast. He completed his training there in October 1957 and proceeded to the Royal Military Academy Sandhurst in England where he was commissioned as an infantry officer in 1959. He later underwent a platoon officer's course in Hythe and a platoon commander's course in Warminster. Nigerian historian Max Siollun has described Nzeogwu as a "devout catholic, a teetotaler, a non-smoker, and who despite being a bachelor, did not spend much time chasing women".

== Military career ==
On his return to Nigeria in May 1960, Nzeogwu was posted to the Nigeria Regiment's 1st Battalion in Enugu where Major Johnson Aguiyi-Ironsi was the second-in-command under a British officer. He was later posted to the 5th Battalion in Kaduna where he became friends with Olusegun Obasanjo. His Hausa colleagues in the Nigerian Army gave him the name "Kaduna" because of his affinity with the town. After serving in the Congo in 1961, Nzeogwu was assigned as a training officer at the Army Training Depot in Zaria for about 6 months before getting posted to Lagos to head up the military intelligence section at the Army Headquarters where he was the first Nigerian officer.

The forerunner of the Nigerian Army Intelligence Corps (NAIC) was the Field Security Section (FSS) of the Royal Nigerian Army, which was established on 1 November 1962 with Captain PG Harrington (BR) as General Staff Officer Grade Two (GSO2 Int). The FSS was essentially a security organization whose functions included vetting of Nigerian Army (NA) personnel, document security and counter intelligence. Major Nzeogwu was the first Nigerian Officer to hold that appointment from November 1962 to 1964. As a military intelligence officer, he participated in the treasonable felony trial investigations of Obafemi Awolowo and other Action Group party members. According to Olusegun Obasanjo, "Chukwuma had some scathing remarks to make about [Nigeria's] national security, and about those who were being investigated. If he had his way, he said, his treatment of the whole case would have been different". Nzeogwu reportedly antagonised some army colleagues in his capacity as a military intelligence officer and even clashed with the Minister of State for the Army, Ibrahim Tako. Consequently, he was posted to the Nigerian Military Training College in Kaduna where he became Chief Instructor.

== 1966 Nigerian coup d'état ==
=== Coup planning and preparation ===
The planning of the coup began with an inner circle of university-educated young officers who intended a national military revolution by seizing power in the regional capitals of Kaduna (Northern Region) and Ibadan (Western Region), and later taking control of Lagos (Federal Territory). Nzeogwu was tasked with leading the revolution in the Northern Region starting with Operation Damisa on 15 January 1966 and, at later stages, Operation Kura, Operation Zaki and Operation Giwa which would have culminated in the murder of the northern establishment.

Nzeogwu began his preparation by organizing a two-day night exercise "Damisa" (Operation Tiger) to train soldiers in new fighting techniques. The exercise was approved by authorities of the 1st Brigade Headquarters apparently unaware of the real intentions of Nzeogwu, and the Brigade Major, Alphonso Keshi, had sent circulars to all units operating under the Brigade to contribute troops towards the success of the exercise. By the time Major Keshi realized "Operation Damisa" was actually a military conspiracy, it was too late to counter the operation.

=== Coup execution and plot failure ===
In the early hours of 15 January 1966, Nzeogwu led a group of soldiers on a supposed military exercise, taking them to attack the official residence of the premier of the north, Sir Ahmadu Bello, in a bloody coup that saw the murder of the Premiers of Northern and Western Nigeria. The Prime Minister (Abubakar Tafawa Balewa), a federal minister (Festus Okotie-Eboh), and top army officers mostly from the Northern and Western regions of the nation were also murdered.

From the existing government, the premier of the Eastern region (Michael Okpara), the President of the Nigerian federation (Nnamdi Azikiwe) and the Igbo Army Chief (Johnson Aguiyi-Ironsi) were notable survivors. Nzeogwu's modus operandi in the North contributed in no small measure to the success of the coup in Northern Nigeria.

According to a Nigerian Police Special Branch Report, Nzeogwu executed at least four army and police security personnel including one of the men on his team (Sergeant Daramola Oyegoke). Nzeogwu also participated in the execution of Col. Raph Shodeinde, his superior officer at the Nigerian Military Training College

After waiting for an early morning radio announcement from Major Adewale Ademoyega in Lagos which did not take place because of the failure of the coup plans for Lagos, Major Nzeogwu made a mid-afternoon announcement, declaring martial law in Northern Nigeria.

=== Arrest and imprisonment ===
Following the announcement from Kaduna, and information that Nzeogwu was gathering forces to attack Lagos which was a huge possibility at the time, Commander of the Army, Maj. Gen. Aguiyi Ironsi sent emissaries led by a man Maj. Nzeogwu heavily respected, Lt. Col. Conrad Nwawo, to Kaduna to negotiate peace talks with Maj. Nzeogwu and a possible surrender. Maj. Nzeogwu set conditions which Gen. Ironsi agreed to. Aguyi Ironsi assumed power, and Nzeogwu was later arrested in Lagos on 18 January 1966 contrary to agreements earlier reached between Nzeogwu and Ironsi. He was held in Kirikiri Maximum Security Prison in Lagos.

=== Reprisals and 1966 counter-coup ===
The abortive January coup, led primarily by soldiers of the Igbo ethnic group and which caused the assassination of many northern politicians and military officers, resulted in inflamed ethnic tensions including reprisal attacks on the Igbo residents in northern Nigeria. The situation also led to a retaliatory coup by Northern soldiers in July 1966, and ultimately to the civil war.

=== Release, Biafra war participation and death ===
Nzeogwu was later transferred to Aba Prison in the Eastern Region where he was released in March 1967 by Governor of the Eastern Region and future President of Biafra, Chukwuemeka Ojukwu.

On 30 May 1967, Biafra declared its independence from Nigeria; this was spurred by the incessant killing of Igbos in Northern Nigeria because of the coup that was led by Nzeogwu which killed key leaders from the northern and the Western Nigeria. This led to the retaliation by northerners on Igbo civilians - Nzeogwu was of Igbo ethnic extraction - which led to riots and killings, and General Yakubu Gowon refused at first to mobilize security personnel to stop the killings.

On 29 July 1967, Nzeogwu - who had been promoted to the rank of a Biafran Lt. Colonel - was trapped in an ambush near Nsukka while conducting a night reconnaissance operation against federal troops of the 21st battalion under Captain Mohammed Inuwa Wushishi. He was killed in action and his corpse was subsequently identified; however his sister insisted he killed himself to avoid being humiliated by the federal troops. After the civil war, orders were given by the Nigerian military head of state General Yakubu Gowon for Nzeogwu to be buried at the military cemetery in Kaduna with full military honours.

== Legacy ==
Some viewpoints have romanticized Nzeogwu as a revolutionary. However, his actions, along with those of the 15 January 1966 coup conspirators, constituted a putsch against a democratically elected Nigerian government. The coup resulted in the murder of top government officials and gave way to a 13-year stretch of military rule (1966 to 1979), punctuated by a democratic Nigerian government from 1979 to 1983, which was stopped by another military intervention that lasted an additional 16 years until 1999.
