= Adewale Ademoyega =

Nigerian military rebel

Adewale Ademoyega (died 21 February 2007) was one of the principal plotters of the 15 January 1966 coup, an event that derailed Nigeria's nascent democracy and introduced military rule to Nigeria.

== Early life and education ==
Adewale was born in Ode Remo in present-day Ogun State in southwestern Nigeria. He earned a degree in history from the University of London. He was one of the first graduates that enrolled as an officer in the Nigerian Army along with Lieutenant Colonels Chukwuemeka Odumegwu-Ojukwu and Victor Banjo, and Majors Olufemi Olutoye, Emmanuel Ifeajuna, and Oluwole Rotimi in the 1966 Nigerian army. Adewale Ademoyega was the last graduate to be commissioned directly into the Nigerian Army Infantry.

== The Biafra War ==
During the Biafran civil war, Adewale fought in the "Nigerian Liberation Army", a part of the Biafran army led by Lieutenant Colonel Banjo.

Major Ademoyega was released from detention by Biafran Head of State Colonel Chukwuemeka Odumegwu-Ojukwu, on 13 August 1966. He then formed the Biafran 19th Battalion and subsequently took over for Major Emmanuel Ifeajuna, who also helped with the 1966 coup as the chief of staff of the Liberation Army. Unfortunately for Major Ademoyega, Ojukwu received some intelligence that some officer would overthrow him. Major Ademoyega was detained along with several officers and comrades. Several of these officers would later be shot by Biafran forces. Maybe Ademoyega was spared however as he truly had nothing to do with this. He was detained for the remainder of the civil war.

Ademoyega was briefly "freed" after the war. However, Federal forces put him right back in detention for his participation as part of the Liberation Army.

He was finally released along with twenty others during the 1974 Independence Day amnesty.

== Death ==
Adewale Ademoyega died on 21 February 2007, after being ill for some time.
