= Ahmadu Bello =

Nigerian politician (1909–1966)

Sir Ahmadu Bello GCON, KBE
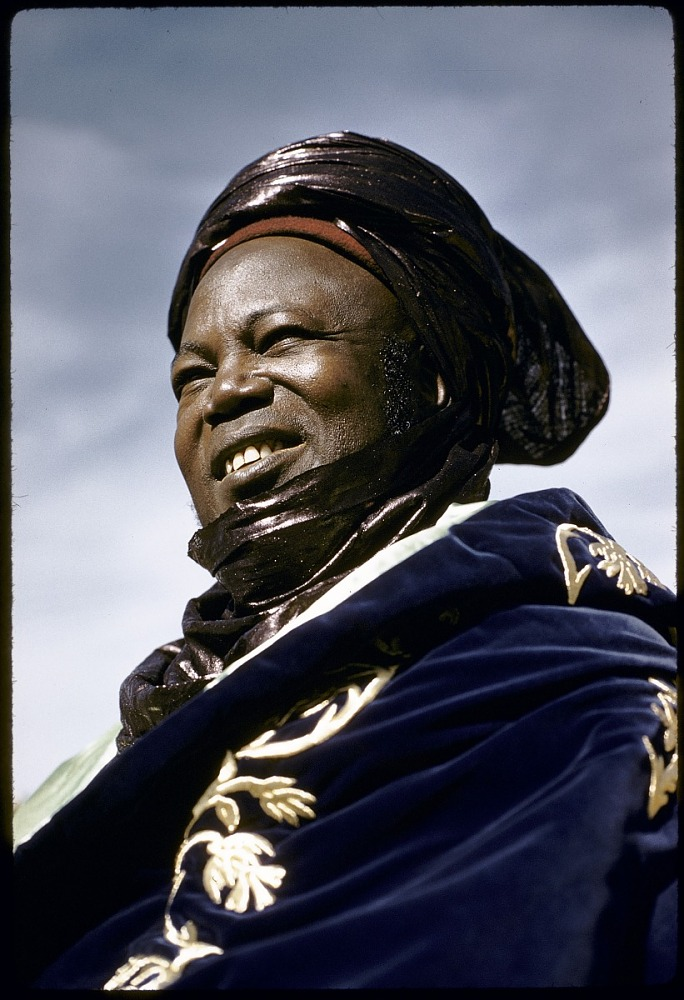

Premier of Northern Nigeria
- In office 1 October 1954 – 15 January 1966
- Governor: Bryan Sharwood-Smith (1954–1957); Gawain Westray Bell (1957–1962); Kashim Ibrahim (1962–1966)
- Preceded by: Position established
- Succeeded by: Position abolished

Leader of the Northern People's Congress
- In office 1949 – 15 January 1966
- Deputy: Abubakar Tafawa Balewa
- Preceded by: Position established
- Succeeded by: Position abolished

Northern Region Minister of Local Government and Community Development
- In office April 1953 – 1958
- Preceded by: Bello Kano
- Succeeded by: Abdullahi Maikano

Northern Region Minister of Works
- In office 1952 – April 1953
- Succeeded by: Bello Kano

Personal details
- Born: 12 June 1910 Rabah, Northern Nigeria Protectorate (now Rabah, Sokoto, Nigeria)
- Died: 15 January 1966 (aged 55) Kaduna, Nigeria
- Party: Northern People's Congress
- Education: Barewa College
- Nicknames: Sardauna; Gamji

Pronunciation of Ahmadu Bello

Sir Ahmadu Bello GCON KBE (Hausa pronunciation; born Ahmadu Rabah; 12 June 1910 – 15 January 1966), also known by his title Sardauna of Sokoto, was a conservative Nigerian statesman who was one of the leading northern politicians in 1960 and served as its first and only premier from 1954 until his assassination in 1966, in which capacity he dominated national affairs for over a decade.

He was also the leader of the Northern People's Congress, the ruling party at the time, which was largely made up of the Hausa–Fulani elite. He had previously been elected into the regional legislature and later became a government minister. A member of the Sokoto Caliphate dynasty, he made attempts at becoming Sultan of Sokoto before later joining politics.

== Early years ==
Ahmadu Bello was born in Rabah on 12 June 1910. His father, Ibrahim Atiku Bello, was the district head and held the title of Sarkin Rabah. He was a descendant of Uthman dan Fodio (founder of the Sokoto Caliphate), a great-grandson of Caliph Muhammad Bello, and a grandson of Caliph Atiku na Raba.

He received Islamic education at home, where he learnt the Qur'an, Islamic jurisprudence and the traditions of Muhammad. He later attended Sokoto Provincial School and the Katsina Training College (now Barewa College). During his schooling years, he was known as Ahmadu Rabah. Some also called him Gamji. He finished school in 1931 and subsequently became the English teacher in Sokoto Middle School.

In 1934, Bello was made the District Head of Rabah by Sultan Hassan dan Mu'azu, succeeding his brother. In 1938, he was promoted to the position of Divisional Head of Gusau (in present-day Zamfara State) and became a member of the Sultan's council. In 1938, at the age of just 28, he made attempts to become the Sultan of Sokoto but was not successful, losing to Sir Siddiq Abubakar III who reigned for 50 years until his death in 1988.

The new Sultan immediately made Sir Ahmadu Bello the Sardauna (Crown Prince) of Sokoto, a chieftaincy title, and promoted him to the Sokoto Native Authority Council. These titles automatically made him the Chief Political Adviser to the Sultan. Later, he was put in charge of the Sokoto Province to oversee 47 districts and by 1944, he was back at the Sultan's Palace to work as the Chief Secretary of the State Native Administration.

== Early political career ==
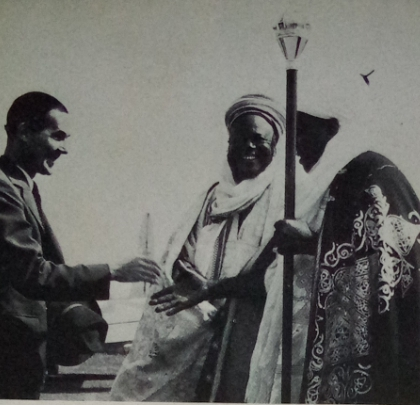

In the 1940s, he joined Jam'iyyar Mutanen Arewa which would later become the Northern People's Congress (NPC) in 1951. In 1948, he traveled to England on a government scholarship to study Local Government Administration, which broadened his understanding and knowledge of governance.

=== Young politician ===
After returning from Britain, he was nominated to represent the province of Sokoto in the regional House of Assembly. As a member of the assembly, he was a notable voice for northern interests and embraced a style of consultation and consensus with the major representatives of the northern emirates namely Kano, Bornu and Sokoto. He was selected along with others as a member of a committee that redrafted the Richards Constitution and he also attended a general conference in Ibadan. His work at the assembly and in the constitution drafting committee brought him appreciation in the north and he was asked to take on leadership positions within Jamiyya Mutanen Arewa. In the first elections held in Northern Nigeria in 1952, Sir Ahmadu Bello won a seat in the Northern House of Assembly, and became a member of the regional executive council as minister of works. Bello was successively minister of Works, of Local Government and Community Development, and of Development and Production in the Northern Region of Nigeria. In 1954, Bello became the first Premier of Northern Nigeria.

=== Independence of Nigeria ===
In the 1959 independence elections, Bello led the NPC to win a plurality of the parliamentary seats. Bello's NPC forged an alliance with Dr. Nnamdi Azikiwe's NCNC (National Council of Nigeria and the Cameroons) to form Nigeria's first indigenous federal government which led to independence from Britain. In forming the 1960 independence federal government of the Nigeria, Bello as president of the NPC, chose to remain Premier of Northern Nigeria and devolved the position of Prime Minister of the Federation to the deputy president of the NPC, Abubakar Tafawa Balewa.

== Premier of Northern Nigeria ==
I am not unaware that I have often been a controversial figure. I have been accused of lack of nationalism and political awareness because I considered that independence must wait until a country has the resources to support and make a success of independence. I have been accused of conservatism because I believe in retaining all that is good in our old traditions and customs and refusing to copy all aspects of other alien civilizations have been accused of many things, but the views of others have never made me deviate from the path which I am certain is the one which will benefit my people and country. I have always based my actions on my inward convictions, on my conscience and on the dictates of my religion

— Sir Ahmadu Bello

Bello originally embraced the Indirect rule system of colonial Nigeria before gradually embracing reforms. During his period of premiership, his biographer, John Paden described him as a progressive conservative, because he was an agent of change and also of the traditional elites. Bello's leadership characteristics was a blend of religious, traditional and modern values and his obligation in colonial and post-independence Nigeria was performing these different roles in the northern region.

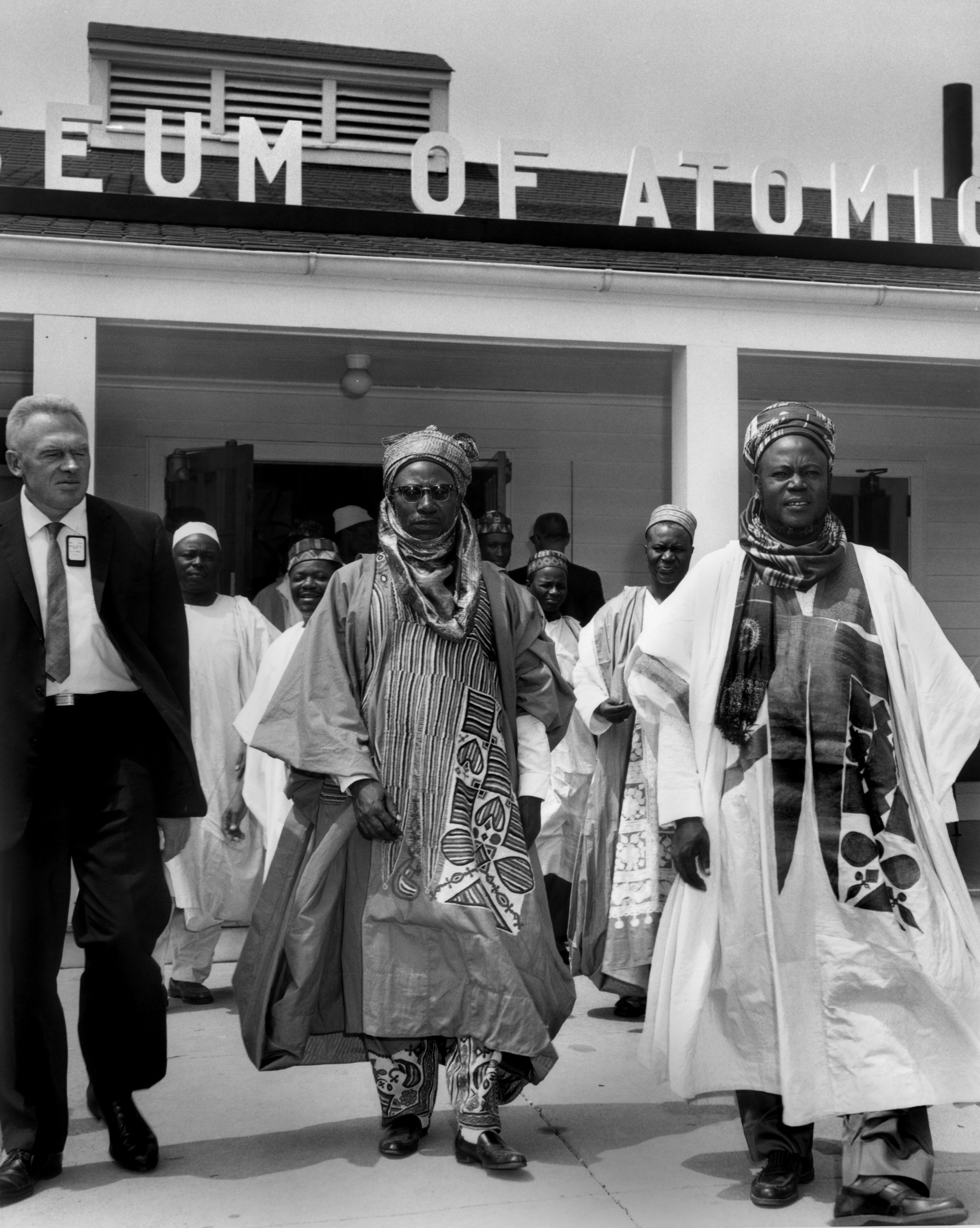
Premier of Northern Nigeria Sir Ahmadu Bello far right, and Muhammadu Sanusi I leaving the Atomic Museum Oak Ridge in 1960

=== Northernisation ===
Due to a limited number of qualified graduates from the region, Sir Ahmadu Bello instated the northernisation of the regions public service. Administration in the North was through indirect rule and Western education was not considered very important in many divisions. After the regionalization of the public service, political leaders in the region felt that the number of Northerners in the service was minimal in comparison to their counterparts in the South. Due to political considerations, leaders in the region limited the recruitment of Southerners into the Northern regional service and found ways to push up the ranks of northerners in junior and senior position. This policy led to increased education opportunities for Northerners, particularly in the Middle Belt region. Regarding the policy, historian Kirk-Greene noted that "It is the Middle Belt people who have supplied most of the secondary schools and output of technicians; while their astonishing preponderance in all ranks of the army has been a surprise to correspondants just going to Nigeria".

The leaders retained the services of expatriates, because Northerners regarded expatriates as transients but feared southern domination of the regional civil service. Measures were put in place to train northerners; in 1949, a scholarship board provided grants to almost all Northerners with qualifications to enter universities. In 1957, administration courses were taught at the Institute of Administration in Zaria. Apart from trying to fill positions in the civil service with Northerners, political leaders in the zone also made it a priority to secure Northern representation in senior positions of the Federal service.

In a legislative debate held in 1952, a traditional ruler from the North expressed his support for the policy. He likened Nigeria to a compound with three houses:

The people in Mr. West's and Mr. East's houses have already gone far on the way,

having started their journey earlier in the morning, but we of Mallam North's house

only have started after mid-day and have begun to understand that alien way.

Therefore it is very necessary for us to run at a very terrific speed in order to

overtake those people, and be able to reach our common destination together.

=== Economy ===
Various institutions were created under Bello, including the Northern Nigeria Development Corporation (NNDC), Bank of the North and Northern Nigeria Investments Ltd (NNIL). NNDC was a holding company with capital sourced from the region's marketing board while NNIL was a partnership between the Commonwealth Development Corporation and NNDC created to assist in the industrial development in Northern Nigeria.

=== Education ===
Bello initiated plans to modernise traditional Quranic education in Northern Nigeria. He set up a commission to this effect and gave official recognition to the schools. The commission recommended the introduction of secular subjects in the schools and creation of different classes for pupils.

Part of his educational objectives was building a school in each province in Northern Nigeria.

== Final years ==
Bello's final years were characterized by his earlier years. A major priority of his was making sure the region was at par politically and economically with the Western and Eastern regions. This contributed to the decision to replace both Southerners and Europeans in the Northern region's civil services with Northerners, a policy that received criticism from opposition leaders such as Ibrahim Imam.

=== Coup warnings and predictions ===
Prior to the 1966 Nigerian coup d'état, Bello received warnings from the Premier of the Western Region Samuel Akintola, and Brigadier Samuel Ademulegun.

=== Assassination ===
On 15 January 1966, Bello was assassinated by Major Chukwuma Kaduna Nzeogwu, a Nigerian Army officer in a coup which toppled Nigeria's post-independence government. He was still serving as premier of Northern Nigeria at the time. This was the first coup in the history of Nigeria, which heralded the rise of the military in the country's politics. Also assassinated in the coup was his longtime friend Abubakar Tafawa Balewa alongside many political elites in the north and in the west.

Bello had three wives at the time of his death. Hafsatu, his senior wife, died alongside him. He had three surviving daughters with another wife, Amina (Goggon Kano). His eldest daughter was Inno, followed by Aisha and Lubabatu.

== Legacy and memory ==
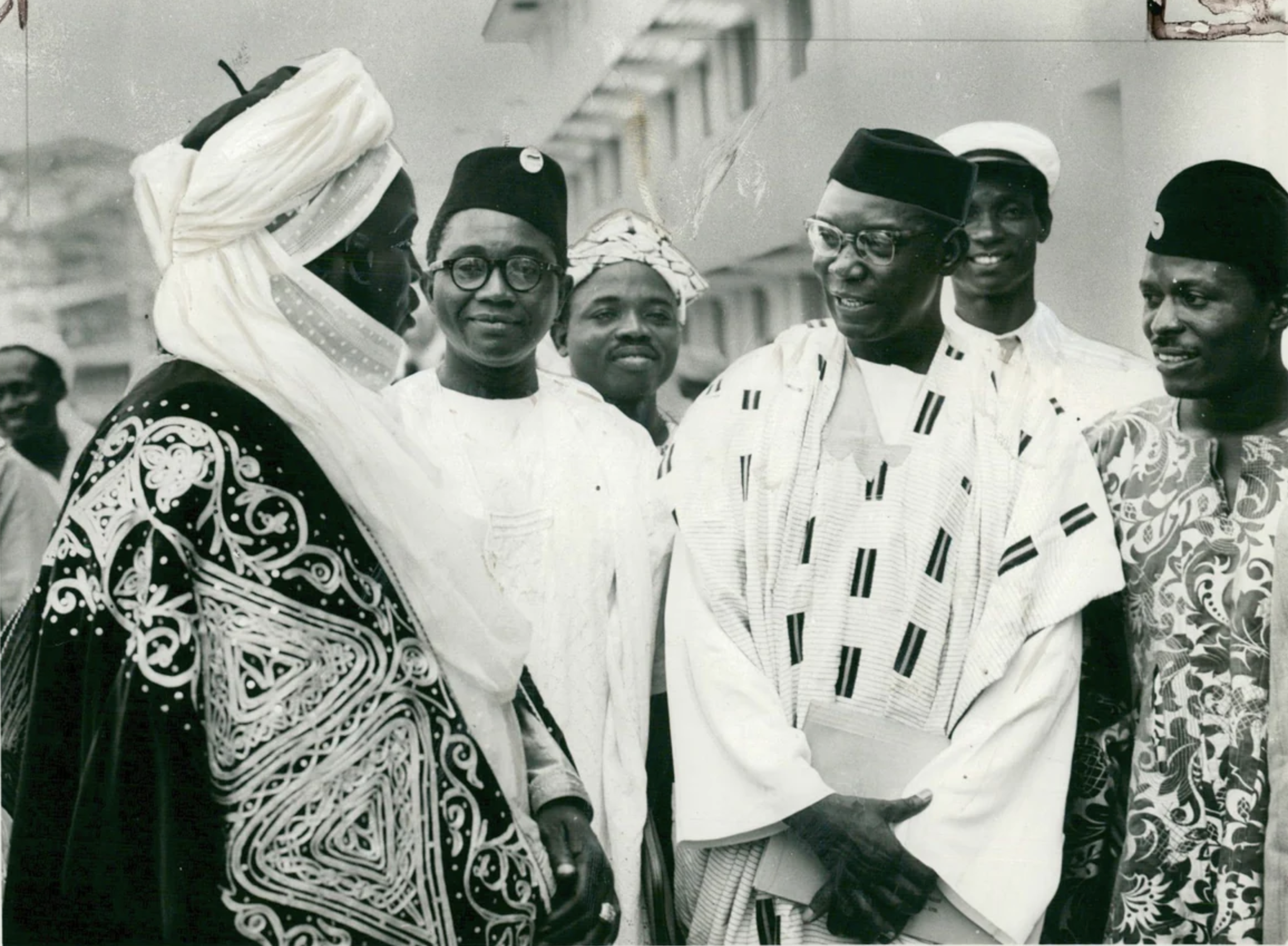
Ahmadu Bello with Nnamdi Azikiwe, 1955

Bello's greatest legacy was the modernization and unification of the diverse people of Northern Nigeria. His personal residence in Kaduna, now called Arewa House (Gidan Arewa), was transformed to a museum and centre for research and historical documentations managed by the Ahmadu Bello University.

=== Reputation ===
Ahmadu Bello believed that every Nigerian, and all human beings are created equally, that they are endowed by God with rights among which are life, liberty, equal opportunity, blessings and the legitimate pursuit of happiness. Throughout his political career and before, he espoused high morality and intellectual virtues.

=== Place names ===
A number of localities and monuments around the country have been named in Sardauna's honour. They include:

- The Ahmadu Bello University in Zaria is named after him.
- His portrait adorns the 200 naira banknote.

== Gallery ==
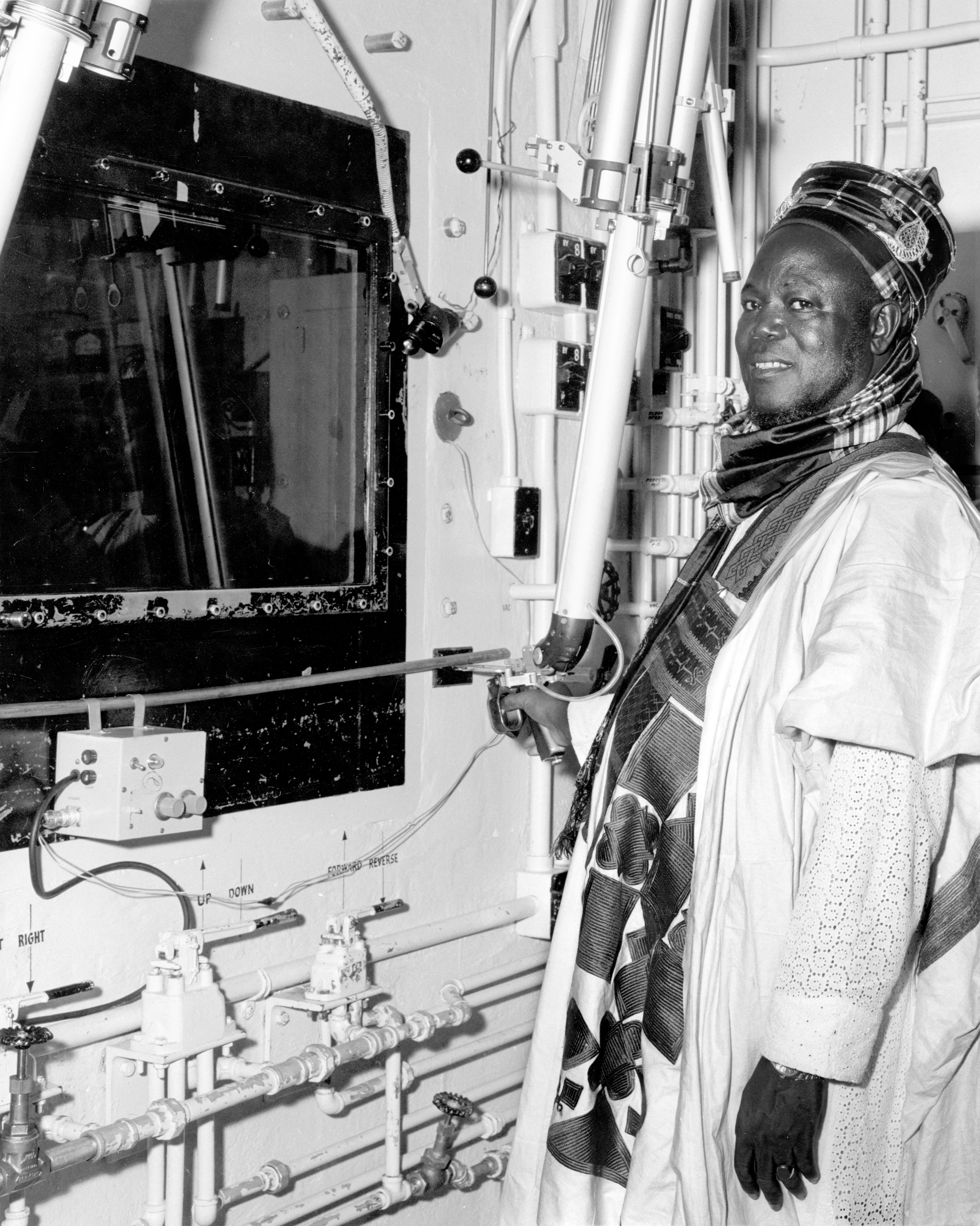
Ahmadu Bello, Premier of the Northern Region of Nigeria, 1960 Oak Ridge

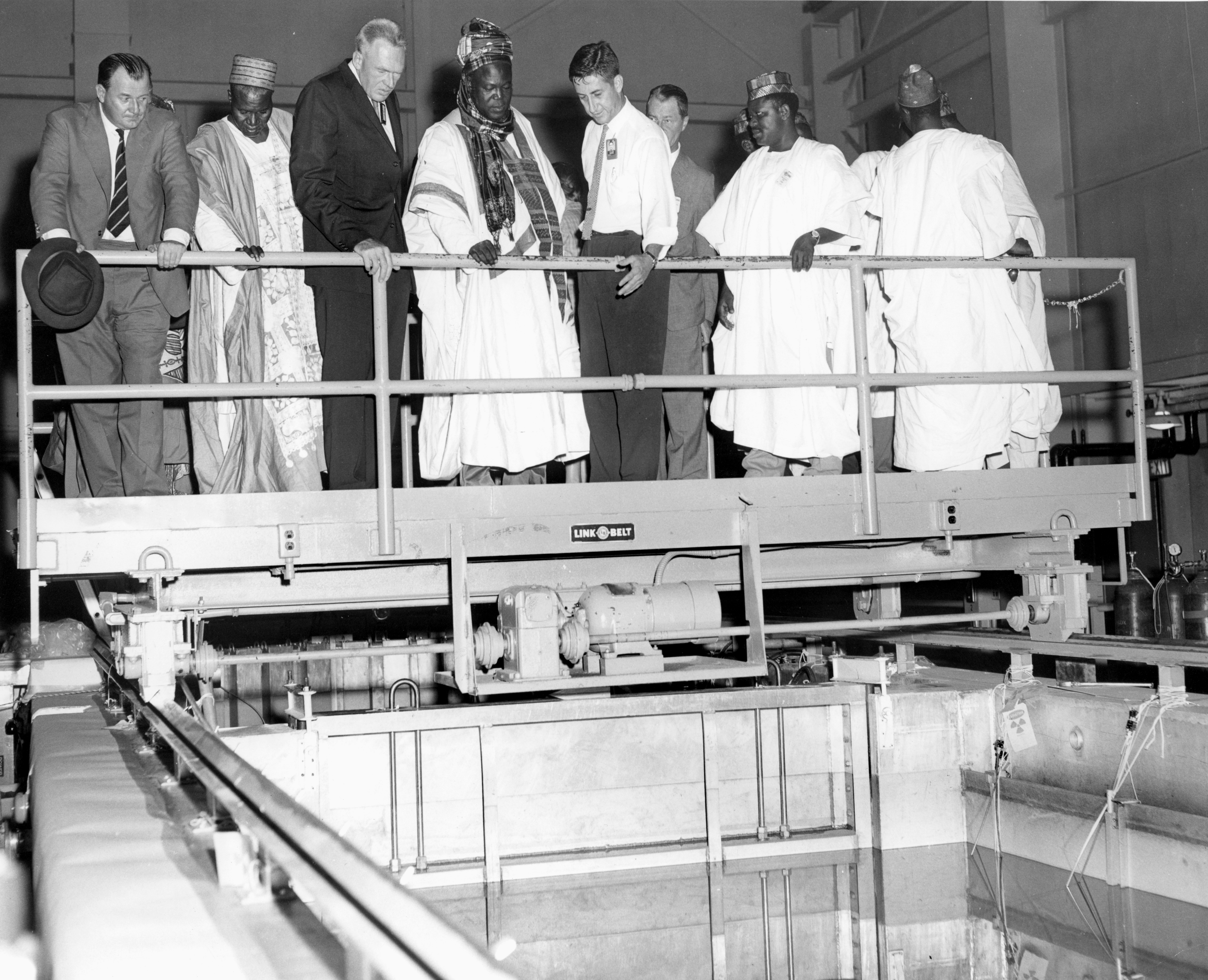
Ahmadu Bello, Premier of the Northern Region of Nigeria, 1960 Oak Ridge

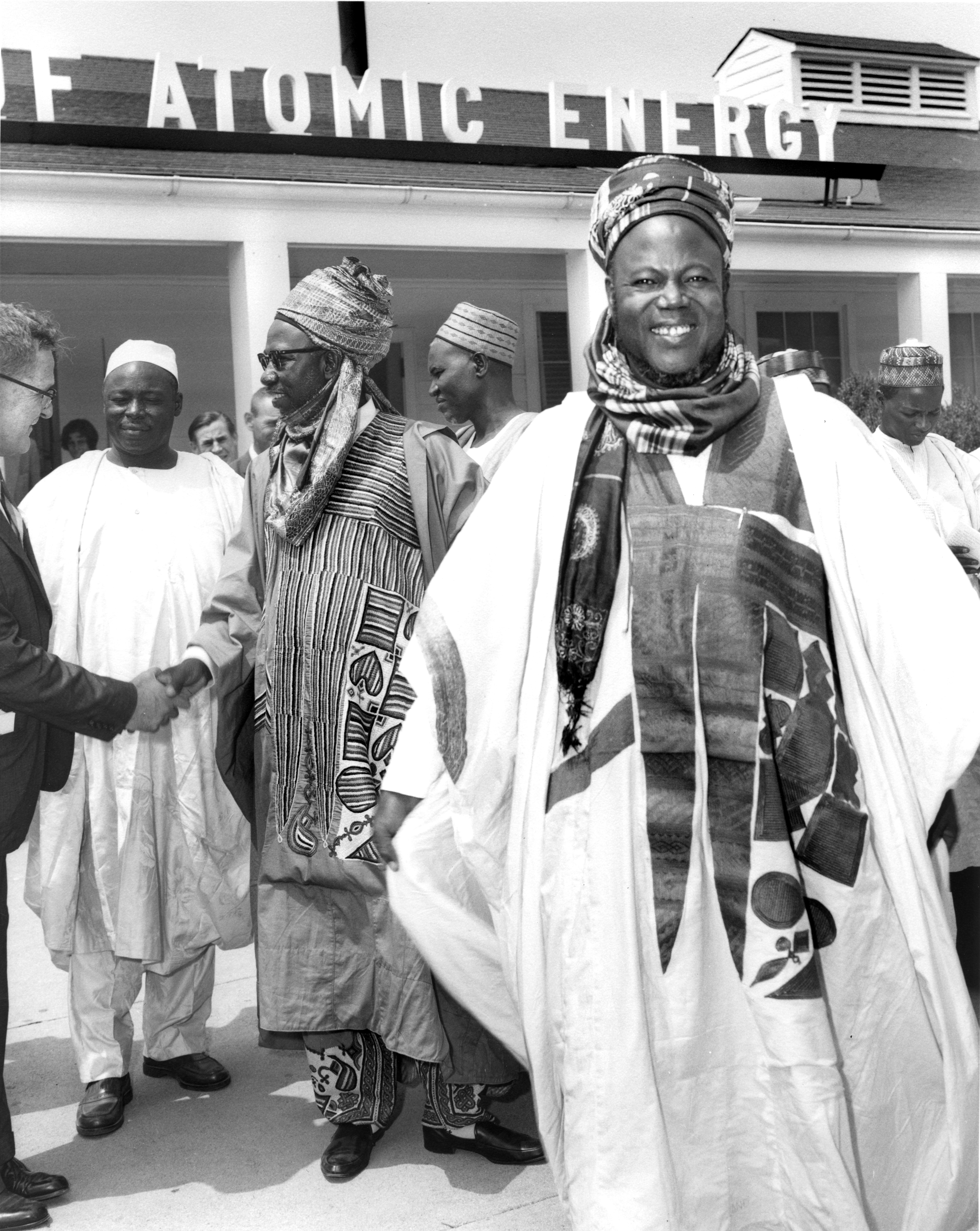
Ahmadu Bello, Premier of the Northern Region of Nigeria with Emir of Kano Muhammadu Sanusi I, 1960 Oak Ridge

The opening of Sultan Bello Hall by Alhaji Sir Ahmadu Bello, University College Ibadan, on Second February 1962

== See also ==
- Nigerian First Republic

Region	Period	Governor	Premier	Notes
Eastern Region	Oct 1960 - Jan 1966	Francis Akanu Ibiam	Michael Okpara	
Mid-Western Region	Aug 1963 - Feb 1964	Dennis Osadebay	Dennis Osadebay (Administrator)	Region created from part of Western Region on 8 August 1963
Mid-Western Region	Feb 1964 - Jan 1966	Jereton Mariere	Dennis Osadebay	
Northern Region	Oct 1960 - 1962	Gawain Westray Bell	Ahmadu Bello	
Northern Region	1962 - Jan 1966	Kashim Ibrahim	Ahmadu Bello	
Western Region	Oct 1960 - May 1962	Adesoji Aderemi	Samuel Ladoke Akintola	
Western Region	May 1962 - Dec 1962	Adesoji Aderemi	Moses Majekodunmi (Administrator)	Administrator appointed during political crisis
Western Region	Jan 1963 - Jan 1966	Joseph Fadahunsi	Samuel Akintola	
