= Zakariya Maimalari =

Nigerian military officer

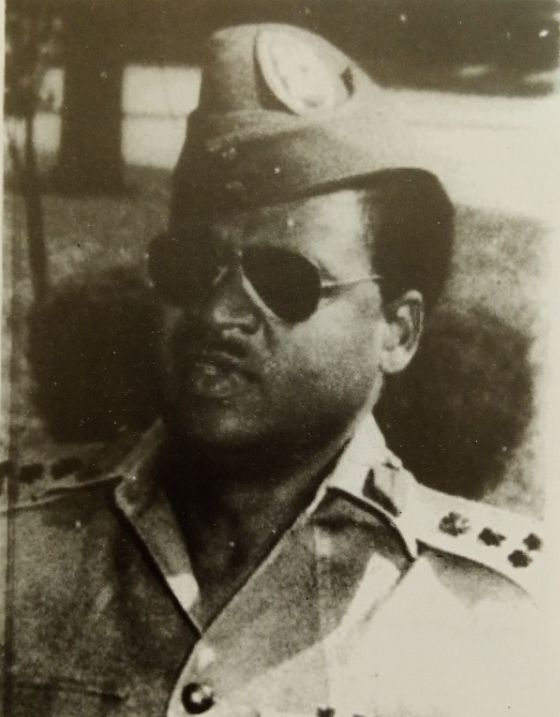

Zakariya Maimalari was a Nigerian Army brigadier, he was killed in the 1966 Nigerian coup d'état. He was commander of the 2nd Brigade, Apapa, Lagos in 1966.

Maimalari was born in the present day Yobe State, he was educated at Barewa College, Zaria. Maimalari and his childhood friend, Lawan Umar joined the Royal West Africa Frontier Force in 1950. As part of a Nigerianization program to enlist more Nigerians into the senior ranks of army, he underwent preparatory course at the Regular Officers Training School, Teshie Ghana and the Royal Military Academy, Sandhurst. Both Maimalari and Lawan attended Sandhusrt but Lawan was later discharged from the army. Maimalari was the first Nigerian regular combatant commissioned into the officer Corps of the Nigerian army. He was an instructor at the Nigerian Military Training College and later commander of the second battalion Nigerian army.

The intention to promote more Nigerian officers led to an organizational structure developed by regional and ethnic considerations. Maimalari was sometimes viewed by some Southern officers as a symbol of Northern domination due to his swift rise through the officer ranks from a regular combatant.

The day prior to 15 January 1966 coup, Maimalari was celebrating his recent marriage, unknowingly some of the attendees were also rebel leaders who would come back to haunt him. On the day of the coup, as soon as rebel soldiers entered his compound, he escaped through the back of his house, at first hiding in a small quarters in his compound before exiting into the main road. On the road, he flagged a car hoping to go to Ikeja, but unfortunately, the car was a rebel car and he was captured and later killed.
