= Johnson Aguiyi-Ironsi =

Military head of state of Nigeria in 1966

Major General Johnson Aguiyi-Ironsi GCFR MVO MBE
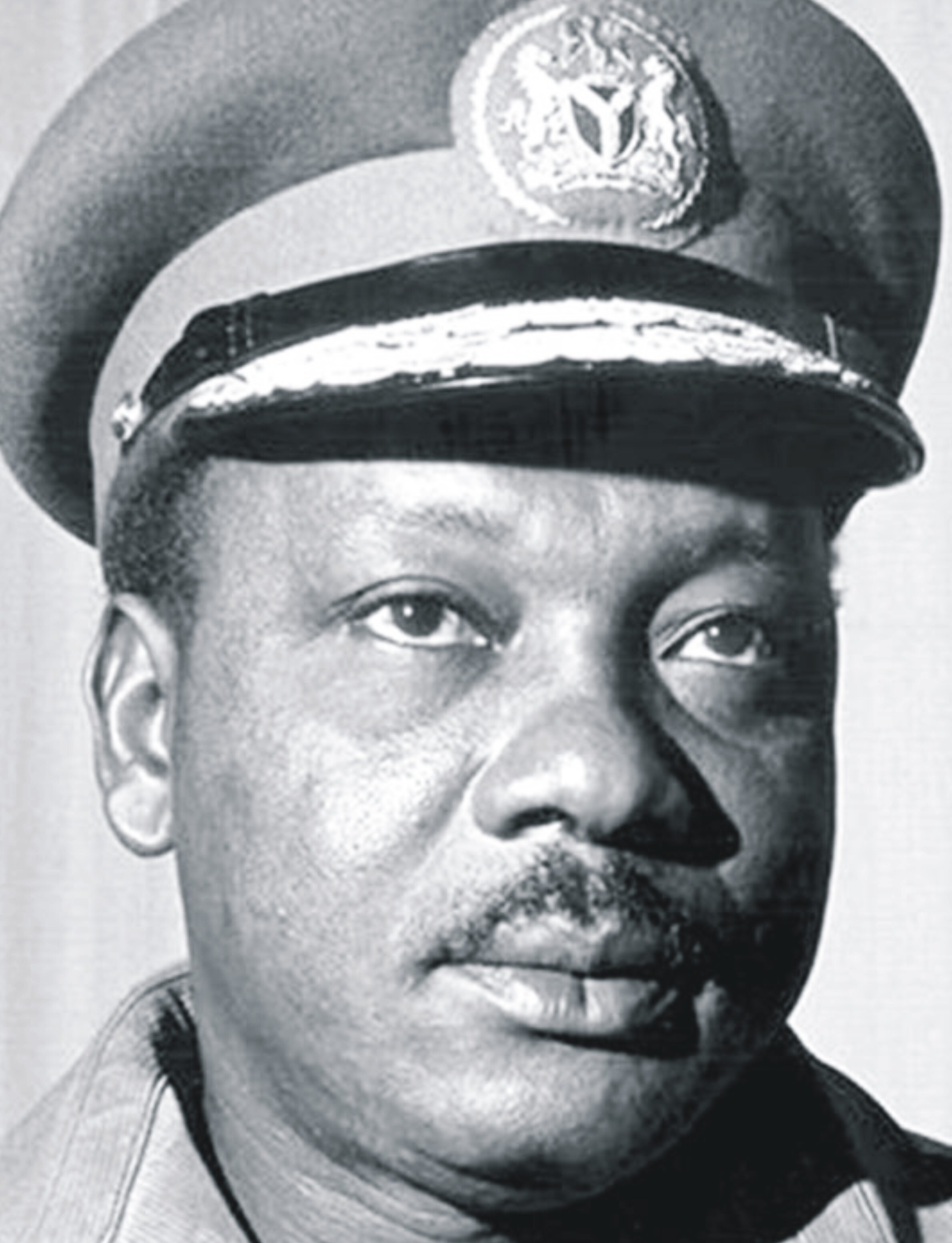

2nd Head of State of Nigeria
- In office 16 January 1966 – 29 July 1966
- Chief of Staff: Babafemi Ogundipe
- Preceded by: Nnamdi Azikiwe
- Succeeded by: Yakubu Gowon

General Officer Commanding, Nigerian Army
- In office February 1965 – 15 January 1966
- President: Nnamdi Azikiwe
- Prime Minister: Tafawa Balewa
- Preceded by: Christopher Welby-Everard
- Succeeded by: Yakubu Gowon

Personal details
- Born: 3 March 1924 Umuahia, Southern Region, British Nigeria (now in Abia State, Nigeria)
- Died: 29 July 1966 (aged 42) Lalupon, Western Region (now in Oyo State), Nigeria
- Party: None (military)
- Spouse: Victoria Aguiyi-Ironsi
- Occupation: Military officer
- Awards: Grand Commander of the Order of the Federal Republic; Member of the Royal Victorian Order; Member of the Order of the British Empire
- Nickname: "Ironside"

Military service
- Allegiance: British Empire (1942–1960); Nigeria (1960–1966)
- Branch/service: Nigerian Army
- Years of service: 1942–1966
- Rank: Major General
- Unit: Commander, 2nd Brigade
- Commands: Force Commander, ONUC
- Battles/wars: Second World War; Congo Crisis

Johnson Thomas Umunnakwe Aguiyi-Ironsi GCFR MVO MBE (3 March 1924 – 29 July 1966) was a Nigerian military officer who served as the first military dictator and head of state of Nigeria. He seized power during the ensuing chaos after the 15 January 1966 military coup. Ironsi ruled from 16 January, until his assassination on 29 July 1966 during the July counter-coup. He was assassinated by a group of military officers from the Northern Region led by Murtala Muhammed.

== Early life ==
Aguiyi-Ironsi was born on 3 March 1924 in Ibeku, Umuahia, British Nigeria, to Igbo Catholic parents. His father was Ezeugo Aguiyi. He took the surname of his brother-in-law as his first name, in admiration of Mr. Johnson, who served as a father figure in his life.

Aguiyi-Ironsi received his primary and secondary education in Umuahia and Kano, respectively. At the age of 18, he joined the Nigeria Regiment against the wishes of his sister, Anyamma.

== Military career ==
In 1942, Aguiyi-Ironsi joined the Nigerian Regiment, as a private with the seventh battalion. He was promoted in 1946 to company sergeant major. Also in 1946, Aguiyi-Ironsi was sent on an officer training course in Staff College, Camberley, England. On 12 June 1949, after completion of his course at Camberley, he received a short-service commission as a second lieutenant in the Royal West African Frontier Force, with a subsequent retroactive promotion to lieutenant effective from the same date.

Aguiyi-Ironsi was granted a regular commission on 16 May 1953 (seniority from 8 October 1947), and was promoted to captain with effect from the same date (seniority from 8 October 1951).

Aguiyi-Ironsi was one of the officers who served as equerry for Queen Elizabeth II of the United Kingdom and Nigeria when she visited Nigeria in 1956 and so he was appointed a Member of the Royal Victorian Order (MVO). He was promoted to Major on 8 October 1958.

In 1960, Aguiyi-Ironsi was made commanding officer of the 5th Battalion in Kano, Nigeria, with the rank of lieutenant colonel.

In November 1960, the 5th Battalion under Aguiyi-Ironsi was dispatched to the Republic of the Congo as part of United Nations Operation in the Congo (ONUC). It was stationed in Kivu Province and headquartered in Bukavu. On 15 December an Austrian medical unit arrived in Bukavu. Fearing they were Belgian troops, Congolese gendarmes, soldiers, and civilians began accosting the contingent. Aguiyi-Ironsi attempted to defuse the situation, but Congolese troops eventually abducted the Austrians and detained them in the city's prison. He continued to negotiate with local authorities to release the Austrians but the Congolese forces refused to let the Austrians leave. With negotiations proving unfruitful, a rescue operation was organised by Aguiyi-Ironsi's second-in-command, Major Roderick Galloway. Late in the morning on 16 December he ordered Galloway to intervene and rescue the prisoners. Fighting broke out and Kivu Provincial President Jean Miruho demanded that the Nigerian forces withdraw to their camp. Aguiyi-Ironsi refused and in returned called for the withdrawal of all Congolese forces and the release of the Austrians. With the arrival of reinforcements late in the afternoon, the Nigerians eventually prevailed and were able to free the Austrians.

From 1961 to 1962, Aguiyi-Ironsi served as the military attaché to the Nigeria High Commission in London, United Kingdom. During that period he was promoted to the rank of brigadier. During his tenure as military attaché, he attended courses at the Imperial Defence college (renamed Royal College of Defence Studies in 1961), Seaford House, Belgrave Square. He was appointed a Member of the Order of the British Empire, Military Division (MBE) in the 1962 New Year Honours list.

On 23 December 1964, he was appointed UN Force Commander in the Congo.

In 1965, Aguiyi-Ironsi was promoted to the rank of major general. The same year, Major General C.B. Welby-Everard handed over his position as the general officer Commanding, GOC of the entire Nigerian Army to Major General Johnson Thomas Umunnakwe Aguiyi-Ironsi, which made him the first Nigeria indigenous officer to head the entire Nigerian Army.

In January 1966, a group of army officers, led by Major Chukwuma Nzeogwu, overthrew the central and regional governments of Nigeria, killed the prime minister and tried to take control of the government in a failed coup d'état. Nzeogwu was countered, captured and imprisoned by Major General Aguiyi-Ironsi.

Aguiyi-Ironsi was named military head of state on 17 January 1966, a position he held until 29 July 1966, when a group of Northern army officers revolted against the government and killed Aguiyi-Ironsi.

== Fall of the Republic ==
On 15 January 1966, mostly young Igbo radical and revolutionary soldiers and few from other tribal extractions, led by Major Chukwuma Kaduna Nzeogwu, from Okpanam near Asaba, Noé in Delta State, eradicated the uppermost echelon of politicians from the Northern and the Western Provinces. That and other factors effectively led to the fall of the Republican Government. Aguiyi-Ironsi, an Igbo, was purportedly slated for assassination but effectively took control of Lagos, the Federal Capital Territory.

During the night of the coup, putschist soldiers attempted to apprehend Aguiyi-Ironsi at his residence. He was away at a party at the time of their arrival and his guards turned the putschists away. Upon returning home, Aguiyi-Ironsi received two phone calls informing him of the ongoing coup attempt. Being thus warned, he went to the Federal Guard barracks in Ikoyi and ordered the garrison to refuse orders except those given from him. He then drove to the police station at the Lion Building in Obalende—dismissing two putschist soldiers there back to their barracks—before proceeding to drive through a putschist check point at Carter Bridge. Reaching 2nd Battalion headquarters in Ikeja, he summoned the officers present and began planning a counterattack with Lieutenant Colonel Hilary Njoku and Lieutenant Colonel Yakubu Gowon. He ordered the arrest or killing of several suspected disloyal officers and had loyalist troops secure key locations throughout Lagos. Also an Igbo, President Nnamdi Azikiwe refusing to intervene to ensure the continuity of civilian rule, Aguiyi-Ironsi effectively compelled the remaining members of Balewa's government to resign. Seeing that the government was in disarray, Aguiyi-Ironsi then allowed Senate President Nwafor Orizu, another Igbo who was serving as acting president in Azikiwe's absence, to surrender power to him officially, which ended the First Nigerian Republic.

== Head of state ==
Aguiyi-Ironsi inherited a Nigeria that was deeply fractured by its ethnic and religious cleavages. None of the high-profile victims of the 1966 coup was of Igbo extraction. Aguiyi Ironsi, who was the most senior officer alive as at the morning of 15 January 1966. after managing to survive the coup by outwitting the coup plotters, he proceeded to rally some troops loyal to him and was able to crush the coup. The perception of many, including the Northern and Western soldiers that no high-profile politician of Igbo extraction was killed, added to the emergence of yet another Igbo General as the leader of the Military Government of Nigeria, led people of the northern part of the country to believe that it had been an Igbo conspiracy. Though Aguiyi-Ironsi tried to dispel that notion by courting the aggrieved ethnic groups through political appointments and patronage, his failure to punish the coup plotters and the promulgation of the now-infamous "Decree No. 34", which abrogated the country's federal structure in exchange for a unitary one, crystallized the conspiracy theory.

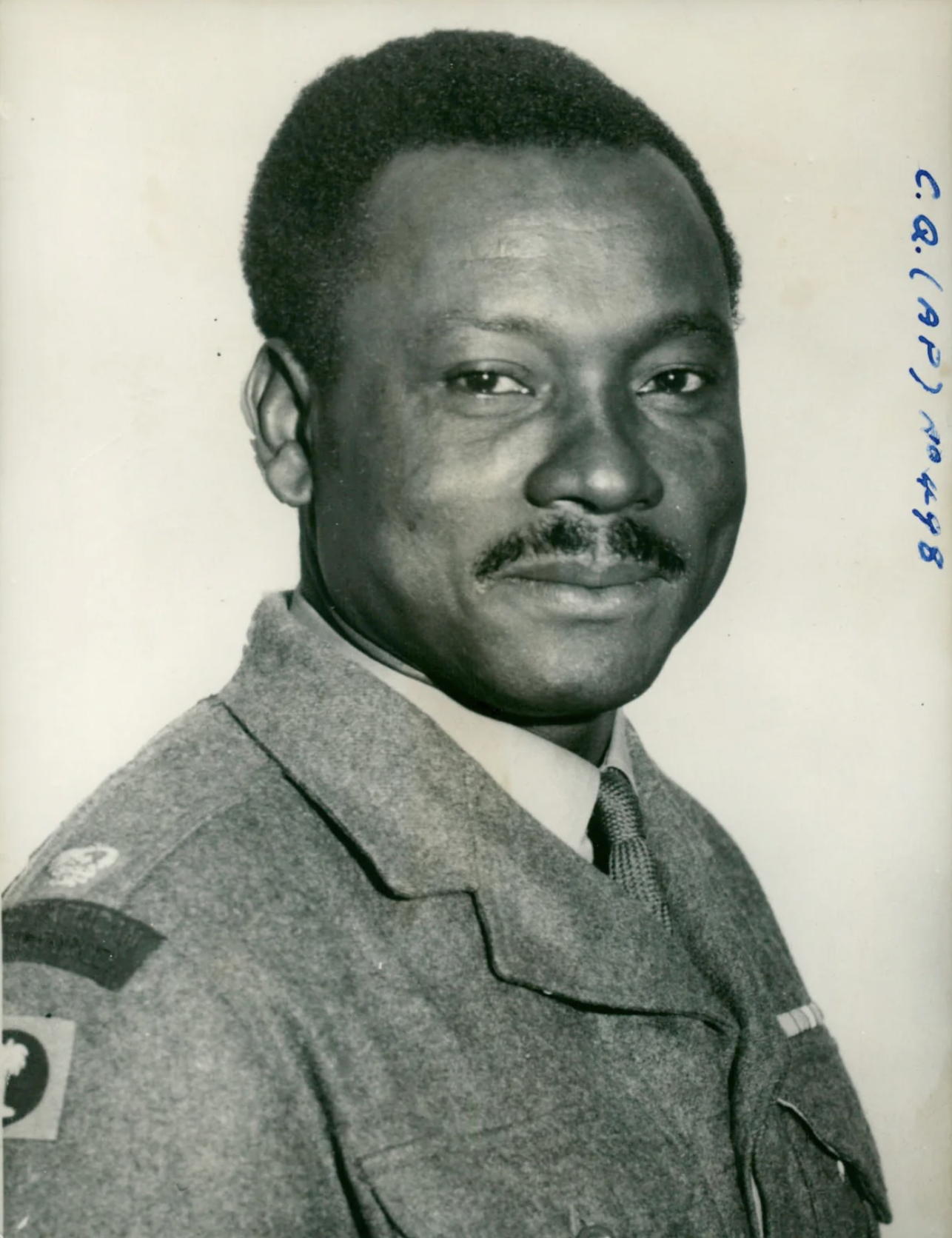
Aguiyi-Ironsi in the early 1950s

During his short regime (194 days in office), Aguiyi-Ironsi promulgated a raft of decrees. Among them were the Constitution Suspension and Amendment Decree No.1, which suspended most articles of the Constitution though it left intact those sections that dealt with fundamental human rights, freedom of expression and conscience. The Circulation of Newspaper Decree No.2 removed the restrictions on press freedom that had been put in place by the preceding civilian administration. According to Ndayo Uko, the decree was to serve "as a kind gesture to the press" to safeguard himself when he went on later to promulgate the Defamatory and Offensive Decree No.44 of 1966, which made it an "offense to display or pass on pictorial representation, sing songs, or play instruments the words of which are likely to provoke any section of the country".

== The July counter-coup ==
On 29 July 1966, Aguiyi-Ironsi spent the night at the Government House in Ibadan as part of a nationwide tour. His host, Lieutenant Colonel Adekunle Fajuyi, the military governor of Western Nigeria, alerted him to a possible mutiny within the army. Aguiyi-Ironsi desperately tried to contact his Army Chief of Staff, Yakubu Gowon, but he was unable to reach him. In the early hours of the morning, the Government House in Ibadan was surrounded by soldiers led by Theophilus Danjuma.

== Arrest and assassination ==
Danjuma arrested Aguiyi-Ironsi and questioned him about his alleged complicity in the coup, which led to the death of the Sardauna of Sokoto, Ahmadu Bello. The circumstances surrounding Aguiyi-Ironsi's death have remained a subject of much controversy in Nigeria to this day. Some people claim it was related to his nicknames and legacy. His body and that of Fajuyi were later discovered in a nearby forest.

== Legend ==
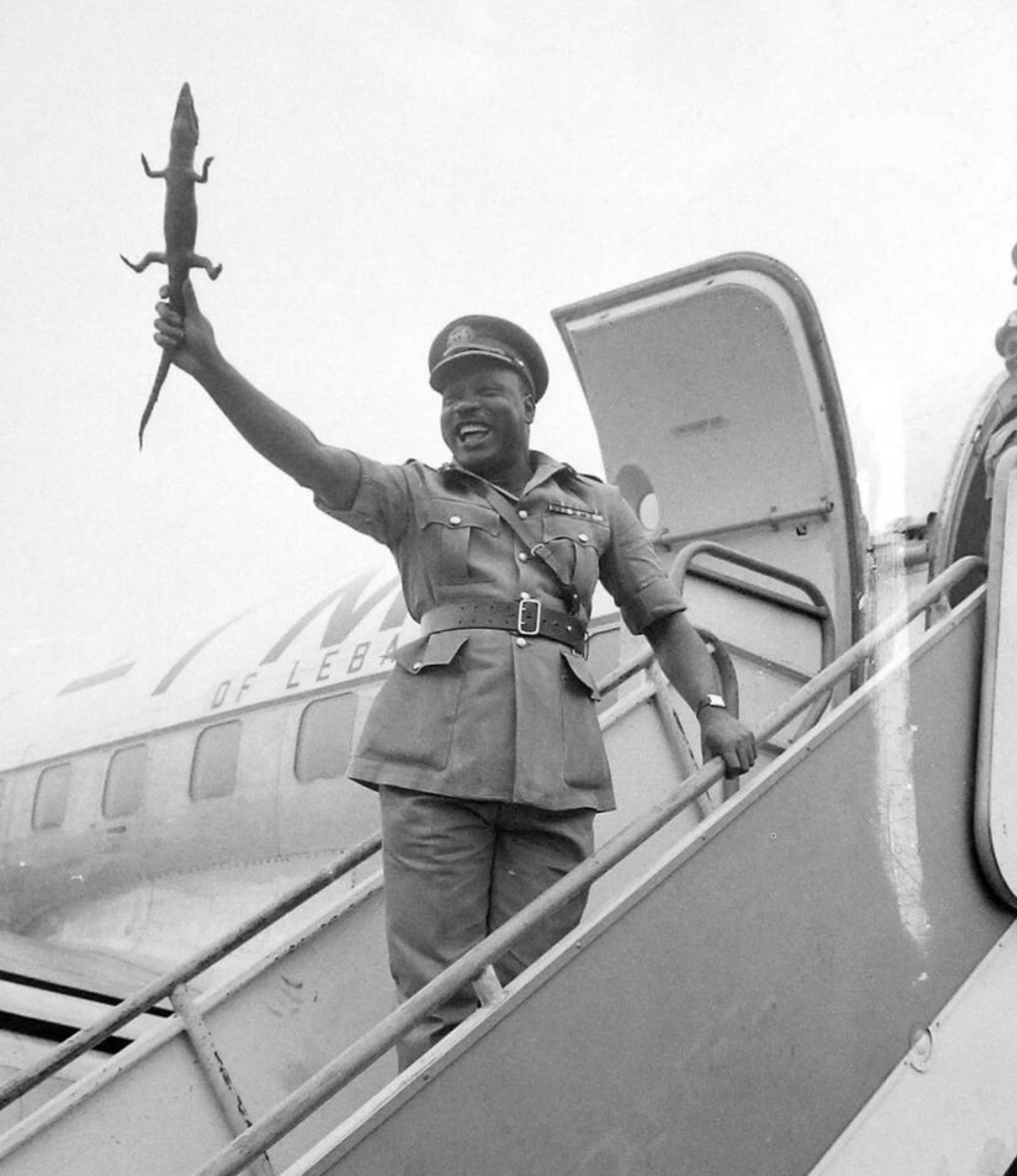
Major General Aguiyi-Ironsi waves "Charlie" as he boards an aircraft at Leopoldville on 1 July 1964. From January to June that year, he commanded the UN Peacekeeping force during the Congo Crisis.

The swagger stick with a stuffed crocodile mascot carried by Aguiyi-Ironsi was called "Charlie". Legend had it that the crocodile mascot made him invulnerable and that it was used to dodge or deflect bullets when he was on mission in the Congo. Despite the stories, the crocodile mascot probably had something to do with the fact that the name "Aguiyi" translates as "crocodile" in Igbo.

In the poem The Reign of the Crocodile by Nigerian poet John Pepper Clark, Aguiyi-Ironsi is symbolised by a crocodile, a reference to his swagger-stick.

== Personal life ==
Aguiyi-Ironsi was married to Victoria Ironsi. His son, Thomas Aguiyi-Ironsi, was appointed as Nigeria's Defence Minister on 30 August 2006, forty years after his father's death.

== Awards ==
The Gallantry Medal was awarded by the Austrian government to Lieutenant Colonel Aguiyi-Ironsi, Maj. Njoku, two expatriates, and twelve Nigerian soldiers for their role in the Congo in 1960 in freeing an Austrian ambulance unit, which had been arrested and imprisoned by the Congolese authorities after it was mistaken for Belgian parachutists.

== See also ==
- List of heads of state and government who were assassinated or executed
- Nigerian First Republic

== Works cited ==
- Schmidl, Erwin A. (1997). "The 'battle' of Bukavu, Congo 1960: Peacekeepers under fire". Small Wars & Insurgencies. 8 (3): 25–40. doi:10.1080/09592319708423183. ISSN 1743-9558.
- Siollun, Max (2009). Oil, Politics and Violence : Nigeria's Military Coup Culture (1966-1976). New York: Algora Publishing. ISBN 9780875867106.
- Lefever, Ernest W.; Joshua, Wynfred (30 June 1966). United Nations Peacekeeping in the Congo: 1960–1964 (PDF). Vol. 4. Washington, D.C.: Brookings Institution. Archived from the original (PDF) on 23 April 2017.

Political offices
Preceded by Nnamdi Azikiwe	Head of the Federal Military Government of Nigeria; 16 January 1966 – 29 July 1966	Succeeded by Yakubu Gowon
