= National Centre for Women Development =

States-owned enterprises of women development, Nigeria

The National Centre for Women Development (NCWD) is a Nigerian state-owned enterprise based in Abuja. It was established in 1997.

== History ==
The NWCD was commissioned on 17 October 1997, and modelled on the United Nations International Research and Training Institute for the Advancement of Women (INSTRAW). It works in collaboration with Nigeria's Federal Ministry of Women Affairs and Social Development. Between 1997 and 2003 the NCWD published a magazine, Images of the Nigerian Woman.

The NCWD has had some leaders; in 2003, Esther Ahudiyu Mangzha was appointed Director General. In 2013 President Goodluck Jonathan appointed Onyeka Onwenu as Executive Director/Chief Executive Officer of the NCWD. Onwenu served for two and a half years, claiming to have raised morale under difficult conditions in which she faced some ethnic opposition. In February 2016 President Muhammadu Buhari removed Onwenu, appointing Abdulmalik Dauda to succeed her as Acting Director General. Onwenu criticised Dauda for reversing some staffing changes. Dauda died in April 2016. In 2017 Mary Ekpere-Eta was appointed Director General of NCWD. In 2021 Asabe Vilita Bashir was appointed Director General of the NCWD and is the current Director General.

== Hall of Fame ==
The NWCD celebrates the achievement of prominent Nigerian women with a Hall of Fame. Names of notable Nigerian women are etched in marble on the wall. The wall includes First Ladies of Nigeria such as Aisha Muhammadu Buhari, Maryam Babangida, Stella Obasanjo and Patience Jonathan, and other prominent women such as Dr Elizabeth Awoliyi, Senator Franca Afegbua, Dr (Mrs) Dora Akunyili, Dr (Mrs) Ngozi Okonjo-Iweala, Mrs Doyin Abiola, Prof Grace Alele Williams and Mrs Sarah Jibrin. In 2007, 27 women were inducted into the Hall of Fame. In June 2019, 22 more women were inducted:

1. Alhaja Kudirat Abiola
2. Stella Ameyo Adadevoh
3. Hajiya Bilkisu Yusuf
4. Alhaja Abibat Mogaji
5. Barr Oby Nwankwo
6. Regina Achi Nentui
7. Iyom Josephine Anenih
8. Oluremi Tinubu
9. Binta Garba
10. Hajiya Mariya Sunusi Dantata
11. Stella Okoli
12. Adenike Osofisan
13. Priscilla Ekwueme Eleje
14. Adebimpe Bologun
15. Iyalode Alaba Lawson
16. Folorunsho Alakija
17. Nike Okundaye
18. Mo Abudu
19. Itunu Hotonu
20. Blessing Liman
21. Abimbola Jaiyeola
22. Maureen Mmadu

== See also ==
- Tech Herfrica
