= 2023 Nigerian Senate election in the Federal Capital Territory =

2023 Senate election in the FCT

- 25 February 2023
- Registered: 1,570,307
Nominee	Angulu Zakari	Anthony Ezekwugo
Party	APC	APGA
Popular vote	78,905
Percentage	20
Nominee	Ireti Kingibe	Philips Tanimu Aduda
Party	LP	PDP
Popular vote	202,125	100,544
Percentage	52	26
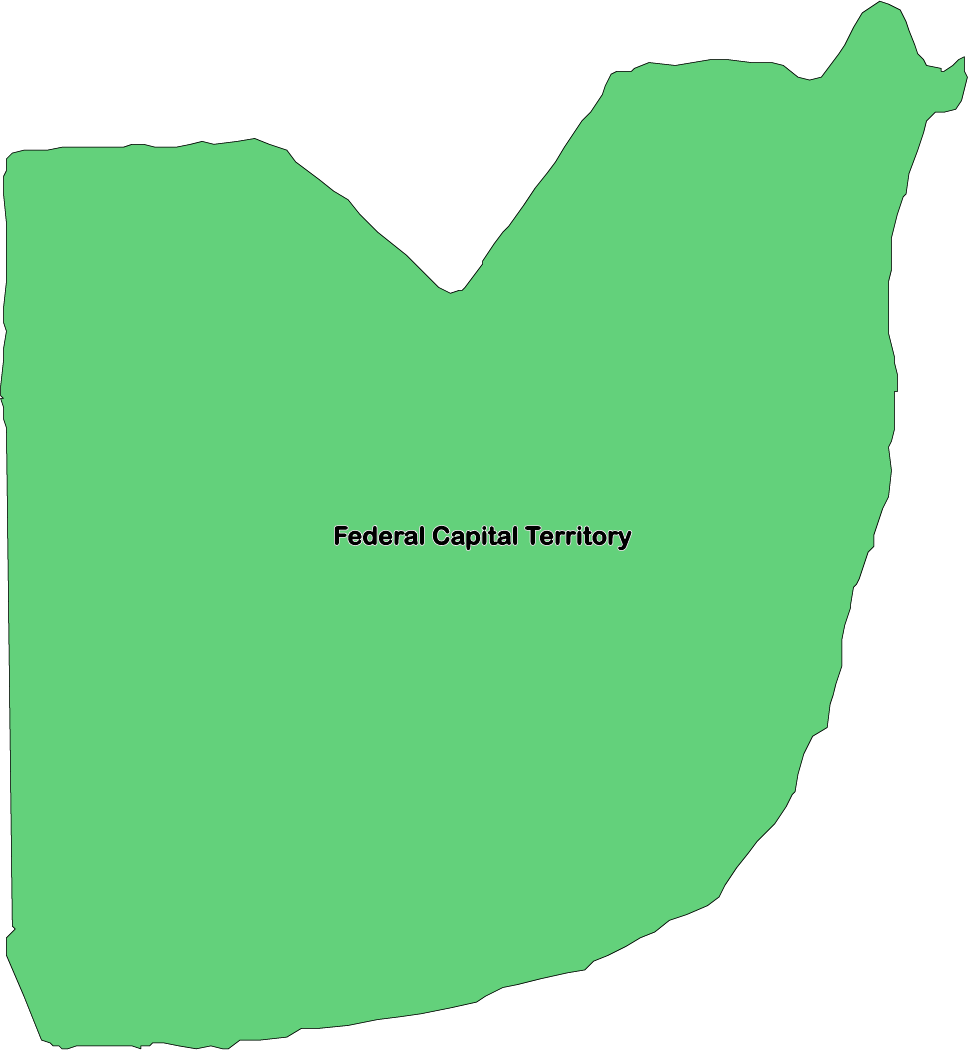
- PDP incumbent running for re-election
Senator before election
Philips Tanimu Aduda
PDP
Elected Senator
TBD

The 2023 Nigerian Senate election in the Federal Capital Territory will be held on 25 February 2023, to elect the single federal Senator from the Federal Capital Territory, with the senatorial district being coterminous with the Territory at-large. The election will coincide with the 2023 presidential election, as well as other elections to the Senate and elections to the House of Representatives; with state elections being held two weeks later.

Primaries were held between 4 April and 9 June 2022 with incumbent Senator Philips Tanimu Aduda being renominated by the Peoples Democratic Party while the All Progressives Congress nominated Angulu Zakari—former House of Representatives member for Abaji/Gwagwalada/Kwali/Kuje.

== Background ==
The Federal Capital Territory Senatorial District covers the entire territory and its local government areas of Abaji, Abuja, Bwari, Gwagwalada, Kuje, and Kwali. The incumbent Philips Tanimu Aduda (PDP) was re-elected with 61.4% votes in 2019 and is seeking re-election.

In other elections in the territory, the state was easily won by PDP presidential nominee Atiku Abubakar, in addition to the PDP gaining both of the House of Representatives seats. Similarly, in 2022, the PDP won most of the councillors election but split the area council chairmanships in the local elections.

At the start of the 2019–2023 term, Aduda retained his position as Minority Whip. He then became Minority Leader in June 2022 to replace the defecting Abia South Senator, Enyinnaya Abaribe.

== Overview ==
Affiliation	Party		Total
Affiliation	PDP	LP	Total
Previous Election	1	0	1
Before Election	1	0	1
After Election	0	1	1

== Summary ==
District	Incumbent		Results	
District	Incumbent	Party	Status	Candidates
FCT	Philips Tanimu Aduda	PDP	Incumbent lost re-election New member elected LP gain	▌Angulu Zakari (APC); ▌ ✓ Ireti Kingibe (LP); ▌Philips Tanimu Aduda (PDP)

== Primary elections ==
=== All Progressives Congress ===
On 20 April 2022, the APC National Executive Committee announced the party's schedule for senatorial primaries, setting its expression of interest form price at ₦3 million and nomination form price at ₦17 million with a 50% discount for candidates younger than 40 while women and candidates with disabilities get free nomination forms. Forms were to be sold from 26 April to 6 May until the deadline was later extended to 10 May then 12 May. After the submission of nomination forms by 13 May, candidates were screened by a party committee on 14 and 15 May while 18 May was the date for the screening appeal process. Ward congresses and LGA congresses were set for 16 and 17 May to elect delegates for the primary. Candidates approved by the screening process advanced to a primary set for 27 May, in concurrence with other APC senatorial primaries; challenges to the result could be made on 28 May.

On the primary date, an indirect primary at the National Women Centre in Abuja resulted in victory for Angulu Zakari—former House of Representatives member for Abaji/Gwagwalada/Kwali/Kuje. Results showed Zakari defeating first runner-up Dayo Benjamins-Laniyi by an 81% margin but controversy arose immediately as party members protested that the primary had been manipulated in favour of Zakari. Members critical of the primary conduct noted the sudden shift in the primary venue from the advertised Moshood Abiola National Stadium to the Women Centre in addition to the purported failure to publish the delegates' list or the voters' register. Benjamins-Laniyi supporters decried the imposition of Zakari as an example of the APC's failure to provide fair opportunities for women candidates but the primary's electoral committee chairman claimed that the election was free and fair.

APC primary results
Party	Candidate	Votes	%
APC	Angulu Zakari	277	90.22%
APC	Dayo Benjamins-Laniyi	28	9.12%
APC	Zaphaniah Jisalo	1	0.33%
APC	Usman Jibrin Wowo	1	0.33%
Total votes		307	100.00%
Invalid or blank votes		2	N/A
Turnout		309	100.00%

=== People's Democratic Party ===
On 16 March 2022, the national PDP announced its senatorial primary timetable, setting its expression of interest form price at ₦1 million and the nomination form price at ₦20 million with a 50% discount for candidates between 25 and 30. Forms were to be sold until 1 April but the party later extended the deadline four times before reaching a final deadline of 22 April. After the submission of nomination forms by 25 April, candidates were screened by a party committee on 27 April while 2 May was the rescheduled date for the screening appeal process. Ward congresses were set for 29 April and LGA congresses were rescheduled for 10 May to elect delegates for the primary. Candidates approved by the screening process advanced to a primary set for 23 May, in concurrence with other PDP senatorial primaries but due to often violently enforced Monday stay-at-home orders by separatists, southeastern state parties held their primaries on 24 May; challenges to the result could be made on 25 May.

The primary, held at the Nicon Luxury Hotel in Abuja, resulted in the renomination of Aduda after his two challengers stepped down for him. In his acceptance speech, Aduda thanked the electoral committee for ensuring peaceful primaries and assured his constituents of good representation.

== Campaign ==
As campaigning intensified in late 2022, OrderPaper Nigeria organized a town hall for FCT National Assembly candidates on 5 December. While minor party candidates gave speeches and offered proposals, both Aduda and Zakari did not attend the event. By early February, reporting showed that Aduda and Zakari were no longer the only major candidates as Ireti Kingibe—the LP nominee who is married to Baba Gana Kingibe and sister of former First Lady Ajoke Muhammed—and Anthony Ezekwugo—the APGA nominee. Pundits focused on Aduda's strength in rural areas, Zakari's reliance on the votes of his native Gwagwalada, Kingibe's boost from supporters of Peter Obi, and Ezekwugo's targeting of non-indigenes originally from the South-East. Overall, it was noted that Aduda, Kingibe, and Ezekwugo were targeting the same formerly PDP base thus the split could help Zakari.

=== Election debates and town halls ===
2023 Nigerian Senate election in the Federal Capital Territory debates and town halls
Date	Organisers	P Present (Note: Denotes a party senatorial nominee attending the event.) S Surrogate (Note: Denotes a party senatorial nominee not attending the event, sending a surrogate in their place.) NI Not invited A Absent invitee								
Date	Organisers	A	ADC	APC	LP	NRM	PDP	SDP	Other parties	Ref.
5 December 2022	OrderPaper Nigeria	P Yusuf	P Obasi	A Zakari	P Kingibe	P Enwerem	A Aduda	P Osho	A Multiple	

== General election ==
=== Results ===
2023 Federal Capital Territory Senatorial District election
Party	Candidate	Votes	%
A	Abdulkarim Saulawa Yusuf		
AA	Jidejisos Josiah Ejie		
ADC	Paul Smith Obasi		
APC	Angulu Zakari	78,905	
APGA	Chikelue Anthony Ezekwugo		
APM	Chekwubechukwu Simon Ekwe		
LP	Ireti Kingibe	202,175	
NRM	Samuel Akaolisa Enwerem		
New Nigeria Peoples Party	Mubarak Ahmad Tijjani		
PDP	Philips Tanimu Aduda	100,544	
SDP	Olanrewaju Lawrence Osho		
YPP	Mohammed Mukhtar Mahamud		
ZLP	Swani D. Buba		
Total votes			100.00%
Invalid or blank votes			N/A
Turnout			

=== By federal constituency ===
The results of the election by federal constituency.

Federal Constituency	Angulu Zakari APC		Philips Tanimu Aduda PDP		Others		Total Valid Votes
Federal Constituency	Votes	Percentage	Votes	Percentage	Votes	Percentage	Total Valid Votes
Abaji/Gwagwalada/Kwali/Kuje Federal Constituency (Note: Comprising the local government areas of Abaji, Gwagwalada, Kwali, and Kuje.)	TBD	%	TBD	%	TBD	%	TBD
AMAC/Bwari Federal Constituency (Note: Comprising the local government areas of Abuja and Bwari.)	TBD	%	TBD	%	TBD	%	TBD
Totals	TBD	%	TBD	%	TBD	%	TBD

=== By local government area ===
The results of the election by local government area.

LGA	Angulu Zakari APC		Philips Tanimu Aduda PDP		Others		Total Valid Votes	Turnout Percentage
LGA	Votes	Percentage	Votes	Percentage	Votes	Percentage	Total Valid Votes	Turnout Percentage
Abaji	TBA	%	TBA	%	TBA	%	TBA	%
Abuja	TBA	%	TBA	%	TBA	%	TBA	%
Bwari	TBA	%	TBA	%	TBA	%	TBA	%
Gwagwalada	TBA	%	TBA	%	TBA	%	TBA	%
Kuje	TBA	%	TBA	%	TBA	%	TBA	%
Kwali	TBA	%	TBA	%	TBA	%	TBA	%
Totals	TBA	%	TBA	%	TBA	%	TBA	%

== See also ==
- 2023 Nigerian Senate election
- 2023 Nigerian elections
