= Esther Oluremi Obasanjo =

First Lady of Nigeria (1976–1979)

First Lady of Nigeria
- In role 13 February 1976 – 1 October 1979
- Head of State: Olusegun Obasanjo
- Preceded by: Ajoke Muhammed
- Succeeded by: Hadiza Shagari

Second Lady of Nigeria
- In role 29 July 1975 – 13 February 1976
- Chief of Staff: Olusegun Obasanjo
- First Lady: Ajoke Muhammed
- Preceded by: Anne Wey
- Succeeded by: Hajia Binta Yar'Adua

Personal details
- Born: Oluremi Akinlawon; 1941 (age 84–85)
- Spouse: Olusegun Obasanjo (m. 1963; div. 1976)
- Children: 5; including Iyabo Obasanjo

Esther Oluremi Obasanjo also known as Mama Iyabo is a former Nigerian First Lady. She was previously married to President Olusegun Obasanjo.

== Biography ==
Oluremi Akinlawon was the daughter of a station master and Mrs. Alice Akinlawon (née Ogunlaja). She met Olusegun Obasanjo in the Owu Baptist Church Choir when she was aged 14 and they courted for eight years. They married on 22 June 1963 at Camberwell Green Registry, SE London, when she was 21, without the knowledge of their families. She obtained training in institutional management in London.

She assumed the role of First Lady in February 1976, following a coup that resulted in the death of Murtala Muhammed. She was not often seen at public engagements like Victoria Gowon, because Murtala Muhammed decided that it was inappropriate for the spouses of military leaders to be in the public eye.

== Works ==
In 2008, Obasanjo published an autobiography titled Bitter-Sweet: My Life with Obasanjo, which chronicled her life experiences with Olusegun Obasanjo, portraying him as a violent womaniser.

Her style is described as "elegant in a subtle manner", as she was often dressed in traditional outfits.

Honorary titles
Preceded by Ajoke Muhammed	First Lady of Nigeria; 1976 – 29 July 1979	Succeeded by Hadiza Shagari
