= Azikiwe =

- Gender: Male
- Language: Igbo

Origin
- Origin: Nigeria
- Meaning: To retreat is better than to give in to anger
- Region of origin: Igboland

Other names
- Nickname: Zik

Azikiwe audio is an Igbo male given name and surname. It means "to retreat is better than to give in to anger".

== Notable individuals with the name ==
- Nnamdi Azikiwe (1904 – 1996) Nigerian politician, statesman, and revolutionary leader.
- Flora Azikiwe (1917 – 1983) The wife of Nnamdi Azikiwe, the first First Lady of Nigeria.
- Goodluck Jonathan (born 1957) Nigerian politician and a former Nigeria president.
