= Hafsatu =

- Gender: Female
- Languages: Yoruba, Hausa

Origin
- Origin: Nigerian
- Meaning: Gathering
- Region of origin: Southwestern and Northern region

Hafsatu is a Nigerian feminine given name of Yoruba and Hausa origin, which means 'gathering'. Notable people with the name include:

- Hafsatu Kamara (born 1991), Sierra Leonean sprinter
- Hafsatu Ajoke Muhammed (born 1941), First Lady of Nigeria from 1975 to 1976
