= Turai Yar'Adua =

First Lady of Nigeria (2007–2010)

Hajiya Turai Yar'Adua
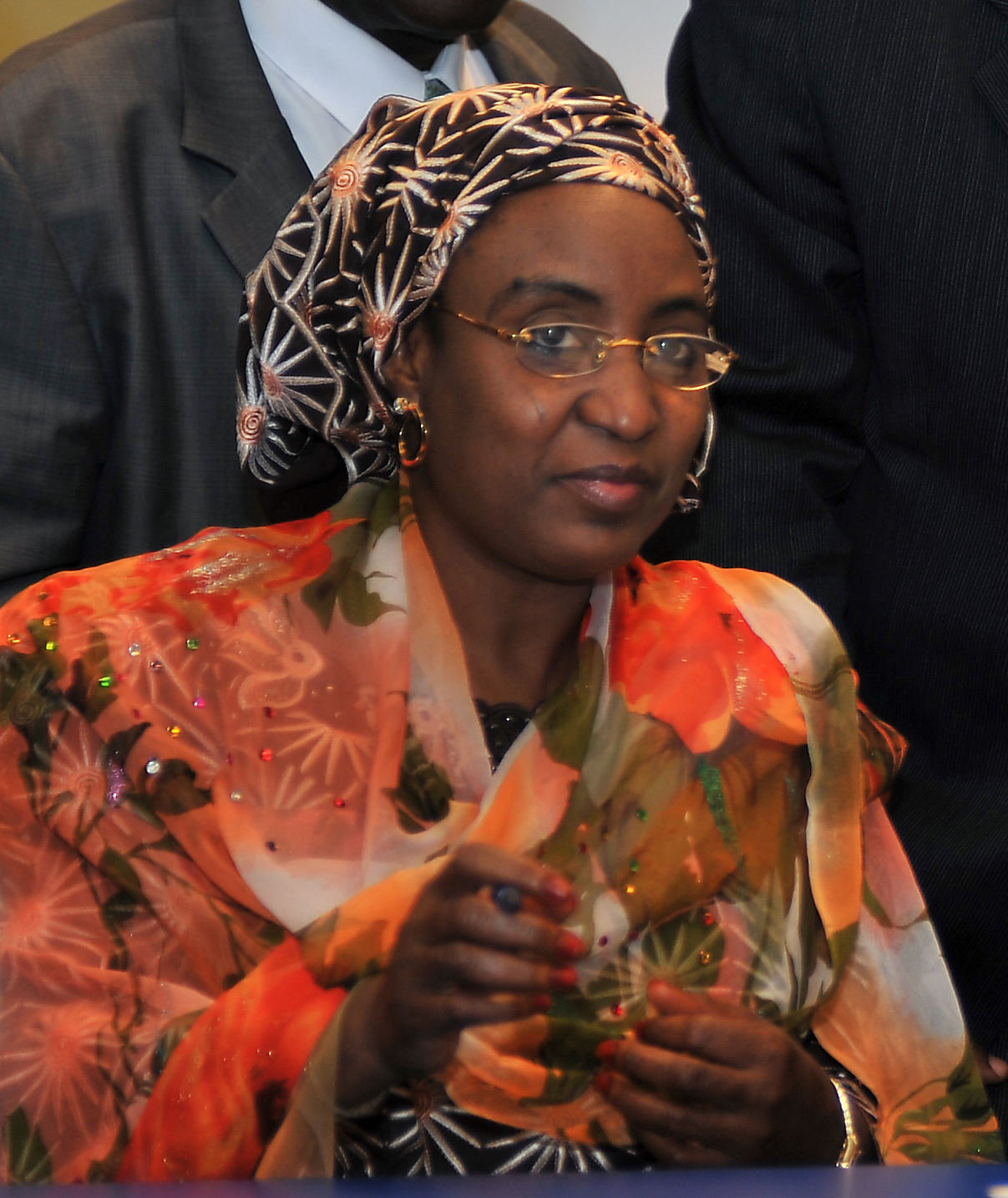

First Lady of Nigeria
- In role 29 May 2007 – 5 May 2010
- President: Umaru Yar'Adua
- Preceded by: Stella Obasanjo
- Succeeded by: Patience Jonathan

Personal details
- Born: 26 July 1957 (age 69) Katsina, Northern Region, British Nigeria (now Katsina, Katsina State, Nigeria)
- Spouse: Umaru Musa Yar'Adua (m. 1975; died 2010)
- Children: five daughters and two sons; including Zainab Dakingari
- Education: Ahmadu Bello University

Turai Umar Musa Yar'Adua (born 26 July 1957) is the widow of the former Nigerian president and former Katsina State Governor, Umaru Musa Yar'Adua. She was the First Lady of Nigeria from 2007 until the death of her husband on 5 May 2010.

== Education ==
Turai Yar'Adua was born in the Katsina metropolitan area of northern Nigeria in July 1957. She attended Garama Primary School in Katsina as a child and proceeded to the Government Girls Secondary School, Kankiya, also in Katsina state.

Turai Yar'Adua also attended Katsina College of Arts, Science and Technology in Zaria, Kaduna state, where she was reportedly named "best student" in 1980. In 1983, Turai Yar'Adua received a bachelor's degree in language from Ahmadu Bello University.

== Personal life ==
Turai married Umaru Yar'Adua in 1975 and they have five daughters and two sons. Her two sons are Shehu Umaru Musa Yar'adua and Musa Umaru Musa Yar'adua. Shehu is the name of Umaru Yar'adua's elder brother and former de facto vice president of Nigeria, Shehu Musa Yar'Adua. One of their daughters, Zainab, is married to Usman Saidu Nasamu Dakingari, a former governor of Kebbi state.

In September 2007, Turai was the guest of honour at the commissioning of the Mobility Aid and Braille Centre in Akure, Ondo State. The centre was built by the Handicapped Education Foundation (HANDEF), a non-governmental organization founded by Olufunke Agagu, then First Lady of Ondo State. Also, in attendance at the event were the Vice President's wife, Patience Jonathan, and the wives of other state governors.

Turai was rumored to be one of her husband's closest advisors during his tenure as president of Nigeria. For example, it was believed that Turai Yar'Adua influenced the choice of Professor Babatunde Osotimehin, the former Director-General of the National Action Committee on AIDS, as Nigeria's Minister of Health, during her husband's administration.

Turai started her career as a teacher, before assuming the role of Katsina state's first lady, serving from 29 May 1999 – 29 May 2007, where she was noted for her empathy towards the plight of the less privileged. Turai Yar’Adua visited the First Lady, Aisha Buhari at the presidential villa, Abuja, early February 2020. The former first lady came visiting with her daughter Zainab Dakingari. The president's wife, stated that the two of them discussed gender-based violence, drug abuse, and the development of the country generally. Buhari added that she got Yar’Adua's perspectives on the issues, adding that Yar’Adua reminisced on the past, especially the years she spent at the State House.

Honorary titles
Preceded by Stella Obasanjo	First Lady of Nigeria; 29 May 2007 – 5 May 2010	Succeeded by Patience Faka Jonathan
