= Asabe (name) =

- Gender: Female
- Language: Hausa

Origin
- Origin: Nigerian
- Meaning: a name given to a girl born on Saturday
- Region of origin: Northern, Nigeria

Asabe is a Nigerian female given name predominantly used among Muslims, particularly within the Hausa community. Derived from Arabic, "Asabar " which means Saturday. In Hausa, Asabe is "a name given to a girl born on Saturday" a day of the week.

== Notable individuals with the name ==
- Asabe Vilita Bashir (born 1965), Nigerian politician.
