= Itunu =

Itunu is a name. It can refer to:

- Aldora Itunu (born 1991), New Zealand rugby union player
- Itunu Hotonu (born 1959), Nigerian naval officer
- Linda Itunu (born 1984), New Zealand rugby union player
