= Kingibe =

Kingibe is a surname. Notable people with the surname include:

- Baba Gana Kingibe (born 1945), Nigerian diplomat and politician
- Ireti Kingibe (born 1954), Nigerian politician
