= VAVA Group =

Diversified business group

VAVA Group is a Nigerian business group whose activities include furniture manufacturing, real estate development, construction, industrial materials, pharmaceuticals, cosmetics and property management.

== History ==
The origins of VAVA Group can be traced to the establishment of VAVA Furniture Nigeria Limited in March 2012. Founded by Egyptian entrepreneur Michael Tawadrous, the company began operations in Nigeria's furniture and interior furnishing industry. Its initial activities centred on the design, manufacture, importation and sale of furniture for residential, commercial and institutional customers. The company initially operated a showroom along the Lekki-Epe corridor in Lagos. As its customer base developed, it opened additional outlets in Ikeja, Victoria Island and other parts of Lagos. During its early years, VAVA Furniture concentrated on residential and office furnishings, including living-room furniture, bedroom sets, dining furniture, kitchen installations and interior decoration.

VAVA Furniture gradually expanded from furniture retailing into manufacturing and related production activities. Its operations incorporated furniture design, material sourcing, production, assembly, distribution and retailing. VAVA's business activities subsequently extended beyond furniture manufacturing and retailing. The group established VAVA Projects Limited, which undertakes activities in construction, real estate development and project management. The company's published project portfolio includes Crystal Bay Towers, Jacinda Court, The Joneer Court, Hezekiah Towers, PC Court and Beach Resort Estate. The group's subsequent diversification included business interests in industrial materials, pharmaceuticals, cosmetics and facility management.
