= Victoria Aguiyi-Ironsi =

First Lady of Nigeria in 1966

Lady Victoria Aguiyi-Ironsi

First Lady of Nigeria
- In role 16 January 1966 – 29 July 1966
- Head of State: Johnson Aguiyi-Ironsi
- Preceded by: Flora Azikiwe
- Succeeded by: Victoria Gowon

Personal details
- Born: Victoria Nwanyiocha; 21 November 1923 British Nigeria
- Died: 23 August 2021 (aged 97)
- Spouse: Johnson Aguiyi-Ironsi (m. 1953; died 1966)
- Children: 8

Victoria Nwanyiocha Aguyi-Ironsi (21 November 1923 – 23 August 2021) was the second First Lady of Nigeria from 16 January 1966 to 29 July 1966.

She was the widow of General Johnson Aguiyi-Ironsi who was the first Nigerian military head of state, he was killed in Ibadan in a counter coup led by Murtala Muhammed which led to the installation of General Yakubu Gowon.

== Biography ==
She hailed from Ohokobo Afara in Umuahia North Local Government Area. She married Johnson Aguiyi-Ironsi as a student of Holy Rosary Convent School, Okigwe in 1953.

Following the death of Samuel Ademulegun and his wife, she moved his children from Kaduna to Lagos and cared for them.

She had 8 children who were taken away and cared for by nuns in Ibadan under the direction of Adekunle Fajuyi during the Nigerian Civil War.

She served as a commissioner of the Local Government Services Commission in Umuahia.

The advent of the office of the First Lady of Nigeria came with Ironsi. Aguiyi-Ironsi brought prestige to the office. She was often garbed in traditional outfits and her style was described as "pretty and effortlessly regal".

Aguiyi-Ironsi died on 23 August 2021, at the age of 97, after suffering from a stroke and COVID-19 during the COVID-19 pandemic in Nigeria.

Honorary titles
Preceded by Flora Azikiwe	First Lady of Nigeria; 16 January 1966 – 29 July 1966	Succeeded by Victoria Gowon
