= Sarah Jibrin =

Nigerian politician

Politician

Personal details
- Born: Nigeria
- Party: PDP

Sarah Jibrin is a Nigerian politician. She is the only woman to have contested the Presidential nomination for the ruling People's Democratic Party (PDP).

== Life ==
Jibrin stood as a candidate at the Presidential primary for the People's Democratic Party in early 2011, but only managed to garner a single vote out of 5000 delegates.

Jibrin served as a Special Adviser on Ethics and Values to former president Goodluck Jonathan.

She was briefly Chairman of the Justice Must Prevail Party (JMPP), established in 2017. In June 2018 she was among JMPP leaders who took a public oath against corruption.

She is inducted into the Hall of Fame at the National Centre for Women Development.
