= Aisha Muhammed-Oyebode =

Nigerian lawyer, entrepreneur, author, activist and philanthropist (born 1963)

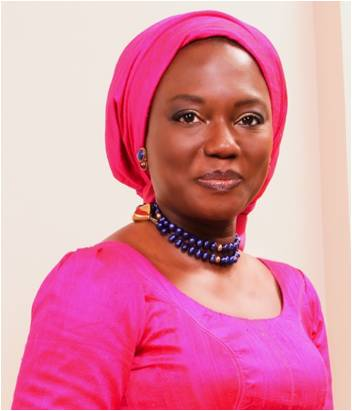
- Born: 24 December 1963 (age 62)
- Education: Queen's College, Lagos; University of Birmingham; King's College, London; SOAS University of London
- Occupations: Entrepreneur; Author; Philanthropist
- Organization(s): Asset Management Group Limited, Murtala Muhammed Foundation
- Notable work: The Stolen Daughters of Chibok
- Board member of: Lekoil Nigeria Limited
- Spouse: Gbenga Oyebode
- Children: 3
- Parents: Murtala Muhammed; Ajoke Muhammed
- Relatives: Ireti Kingibe (aunt)

Aisha Muhammed-Oyebode (born 24 December 1963) is a Nigerian lawyer, entrepreneur, author, activist and philanthropist. She is currently the Group chief executive officer of Asset Management Group Limited and the chief executive officer of Murtala Muhammed Foundation.

== Early life and education ==
Muhammed-Oyebode is the first of six children born to the late General Murtala Ramat Muhammed, a former Head of state of Nigeria. Her mother is Ajoke Murtala Muhammed. Muhammed-Oyebode's father was assassinated when she was twelve years old.

Muhammed-Oyebode had her secondary school education at the Queen's College, Lagos. She studied law at the University of Buckingham, UK, and holds an LLB Honors degree. Her Master's in Law degree is in Public International Law from King's College, University of London and she also has an MBA in Finance from the Imperial College, London. She has a doctorate degree from the SOAS University of London.

== Career ==
Muhammed-Oyebode had her national youth service at the Ministry of External Affairs in Lagos between 1988 and 1989. She began her career as an associate at the firm of Ajumogobia, Okeke, Oyebode & Aluko in Lagos in 1989. In 1991, she established Asset Management Group Limited, a real estate development company.

Muhammed-Oyebode has served on the board of different organisations, including as Chair of the Board of Trustees of Unity School Old Students Association. She was also a non-executive director of Diamond Bank Nigeria. In 2017, she was appointed as a board member of the Women's Leadership Board of the Women and Public Policy Program at the Harvard Kennedy School, Cambridge, Massachusetts. Other board memberships include as Board Chair, Lekoil Nigeria Limited and as Board Chair, NEEM Foundation.

== Philanthropy/activism ==
Aisha Muhammed-Oyebode founded the Murtala Muhammed Foundation in 2001. The foundation was named in honour of her late father, and works on social and security issues in the northern states of Nigeria.

As an activist, Muhammed-Oyebode is part of the Bring Back Our Girls Movement, a group that called for the return of the 276 Chibok Schoolgirls who were kidnapped from the Chibok Local Government of Borno State, Nigeria, by Boko Haram terrorists in April 2014.

== Bibliography ==
Aisha Muhammed-Oyebode is the author of The Stolen Daughters of Chibok, a book that documents personal interviews from 152 of the parents/relatives of the 276 children abducted in 2014 in the Chibok schoolgirls kidnapping.

== Awards and recognition ==
| Year | Award Ceremony | Prize | Result |
|---|---|---|---|
| 2016 | New African Woman Award | New African Woman Civil Society | Shortlisted |
| 2019 | Nigerian Higher Education Foundation Award | Jonathan F. Fanton Leadership in Education Award | Honoured |

== Personal life ==
Aisha Muhammed-Oyebode is married to Gbenga Oyebode, a lawyer and co-founder of Aluko & Oyebode. She has three children.
