= Mary Ekpere-Eta =

Nigerian barrister and activist

Mary Ekpere-Eta OON
- Citizenship: Nigerian
- Occupations: Lawyer, Farmer
- Organization: Chartered institute of Taxation Nigeria

Mary Ekpere-Eta is a Nigerian barrister and activist. She is Director General of the National Centre for Women Development (NCWD) in Abuja.

== Life ==
Mary Eta is a lawyer, farmer and fellow of the Chartered Institute of Taxation of Nigeria. In 2012 she made a bid to become Governor of Cross River State. She is a representative of South-South women on the board of trustees of the All Progressives Congress (APC).

President Buhari appointed Ekpere-Eta as Director General of NCWD in April 2017.

== Awards and honours ==
In May 2023, a Nigerian National Honour of Officer of the Order of the Niger (OON) was conferred on her by President Muhammadu Buhari.
