= Zainab Dakingari =

First Lady of Kebbi State (2007–2015)

Hajiya Zainab Dakingari

First Lady of Kebbi State
- In role 29 May 2007 – 29 May 2015
- Governor: Usman Dakingari

Personal details
- Born: 1 October 1979 (age 46) Katsina, Kaduna State, Nigeria (now in Katsina State, Nigeria)
- Spouse: Usman Saidu Nasamu Dakingari
- Children: 4

Zainab Usman Saidu Dakingari (née Yar'Adua; born 1 October 1979) is the daughter of the former president of Nigeria, Alhaji Umaru Musa Yar'Adua and wife to the former Executive Governor of Kebbi State, Alhaji Usman Saidu Nasamu Dakingari.

== Early life and education ==
Zainab Umaru Musa Yar'Adua was born in Katsina State on the 1 October 1979 to Umaru Musa Yar'Adua and Turai Yar'Adua. She began her educational career at Katsina Steel Rolling Primary School between 1986 and 1992. She started her secondary education at Government Girls Secondary School Bakori between 1993 and 1996, and later joined Essence International School Kaduna between 1996 and 1999. She was a student at the University of Maiduguri, Borno State, from 2000 to 2002. Between 2003 and 2006, she was a student at the Huron University, London, United Kingdom and then Project Management College, United Kingdom.

== Politics ==
She was the First Lady of Kebbi State from 2007 to 2015 and also the Initiator and Chief Executive Officer ZADAF Foundation for Women and Children Empowerment.

== Award/Honours ==
- Federal Medical Center, Birnin Kebbi Child Health Week, Equity 2009 (5 August 2009)
- Women for Peace International Global Peace Diplomat (30 September 2009)

== Bibliography ==
- Kabir, Hajara Muhammad,. Northern women development. [Nigeria]. ISBN 978-978-906-469-4. OCLC 890820657.
