= Esther Mangzha =

Nigerian educational planner (born 1952)

Esther Ahudiyu Mangzha
- Born: June 15, 1952 (age 74); Askira/Uba, Borno State, Nigeria
- Education: Women Teachers' College, Maiduguri; Ahmadu Bello University, Zaria; University of Jos; University of Maiduguri
- Occupations: Educationalist, administrator, women's development advocate
- Years active: 1971–present
- Spouse: Titus Alakirawa Gwagwa Mangzha
- Children: 9

Esther Ahudiyu Mangzha is a Nigerian educational planner and administrator who served as Director‐General of the National Centre for Women Development (NCWD) and has held a range of senior positions in Borno State before transferring to the federal civil service. After retirement she founded the Integrated Women and Youth Empowerment Centre (IWAYEC) to support vulnerable women, youths and children, and currently partners with the Victims Support Fund to assist those affected by insurgency in the Northeast.

== Early life and education ==
Mangzha was born in Askira/Uba Local Government Area of Borno State, Nigeria. She began her formal schooling at Native Authority Primary School, Uba (1960–1965). She trained as a teacher at Women Teachers' College in Maiduguri (1966–1970) before earning a Bachelor's and master's degree in education at Ahmadu Bello University, Zaria (1974–1978). She later completed postgraduate studies at the University of Jos (1983–1985) and holds a PhD in Educational Planning and Administration from the University of Maiduguri.

== Career ==
Mangzha's civil-service career spans more than three decades across local, state, and federal levels. She began her career as a teacher (TC II) in Borno State from 1971 to 1974, and later served as a graduate teacher with the Borno State Ministry of Education between 1978 and 1980. From 1980 to 1985, she was the pioneer principal of the Women Teachers’ College, Nogoshe, before becoming principal of the Shehu Garbai School in Maiduguri from 1985 to 1988.

Between 1989 and 1990, Mangzha worked as Chief Education Officer at the Borno State Ministry of Education, and subsequently as Co-ordinator of the Better Life Programme for Rural Women from 1990 to 1991. She served as deputy director of Women's Development at the Borno State Social Welfare Department from 1991 to 1994, and continued as deputy director of Social Welfare from 1994 to 1996.

In 1996, she was appointed Chairperson of the Askira/Uba Local Government Council, a role she held until 1997, after which she became Director of the Family Support Programme in Borno State from 1997 to 1999. During the late 1990s, she also served as Honourable Commissioner for the Ministry of Women Affairs and Social Development in Borno State.

At the federal level, Mangzha joined the National Centre for Women Development (NCWD) in Abuja in 2000, where she initially served as Manager of Training and Development and later as Manager of Administration and Personnel. From 2003 until her retirement, she rose to become Acting Director-General and ultimately Director-General of the NCWD.

Throughout her career, Mangzha also contributed to numerous committees and associations, including the National Council of Women Societies, MAMSER, the National Directorate of Employment, and served as State Leader of the Women in Action Brigade.

== IWAYEC and advocacy ==
After retiring from the federal civil service, Mangzha founded the Integrated Women and Youth Empowerment Centre (IWAYEC), an NGO that provides vocational training, capacity building, peace education and gender-based violence support to women, youths, orphans and widows in rural communities. Under her leadership, IWAYEC has partnered with the Victims Support Fund to assist survivors of insurgency-related sexual and gender-based violence in Northeast Nigeria.

== Publications ==
Mangzha has authored nine books on family life, women's empowerment and nutrition, including:

- Better Family Life (1983)
- Mother's Heritage (1985)
- Kyakyawar Hanyar Rayuwa Iyali (1985)
- Role of Women in National Development (1989)
- A compilation of traditional/local nutritional snacks and drinks (most recent)

== Awards and honours ==
- Best Student, Women Teachers' College (1970)
- Best Leader in Citizenship and Leadership Training (1987)
- NCWS Award, Borno State Chapter (1996)
- Marghi Student Union Award (1997)
- Boys and Girls Guide of Nigeria Award (1998)
- Boys Scout Merit Award; University of Maiduguri Merit Award; Trustee Member, Uba Chiefdom (since 1996)

== Personal life ==
Mangzha is married to Titus Alakirawa Gwagwa Mangzha; they have five sons and four daughters. Her interests include travelling, writing, adventure, counselling and handicrafts.
