= Aisha Babangida =

Humanitarian leader

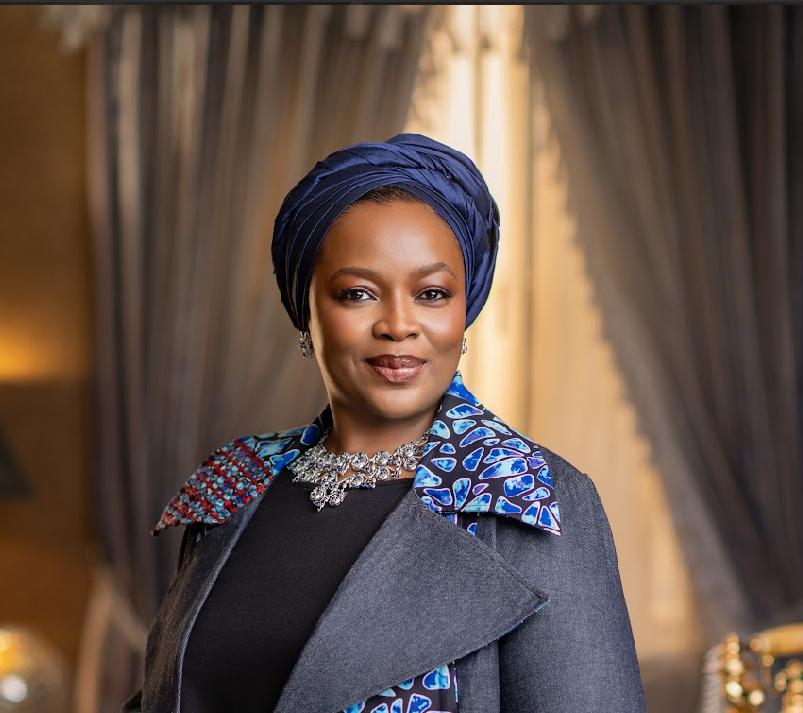
- Born: May 25, 1970 (age 56)
- Education: Webster University Geneva, Switzerland
- Occupation: Philanthropist
- Known for: The Chairperson of the Better Life Program for the African Rural Woman, Founder of Women Enterprise Alliance, Founder Egwafin Micro Finance Bank, Suleja Nigeria, Director El Amin International School, Nigeria
- Parents: Ibrahim Babangida (father); Maryam Babangida (mother)

Aisha Babangida is a humanitarian leader and the chairperson of the Better Life Program for the African Rural Woman. She is the first child of the Former Nigerian Military President Ibrahim Badamasi Babangida. Aisha is also the founder of Tasnim Foundation, a charity organisation that provides scholarship to young girls in rural areas with the view of encouraging the girl child education.

== Early life and education ==
Aisha was born in Nigeria to Nigerian born parents. She has had her education at St Georges International School, Montreux, Switzerland and the Wharton Business School, Insead, United Nations Institute for Training and Research, Cambridge Judge Business School and Webster University Geneva, Switzerland.

== Career ==
In 2009 Aisha took over the leadership of the Better Life Program for the African Rural Woman after the demise of her mother. In addition to the Better Life Program for the African Rural Woman, Aisha is also the founder of Women Enterprise Alliance (WenA) as well as the founder of Egwafin Micro Finance Bank in Nigeria. She had also worked with numerous nonprofit organizations.

Aisha advocates for women's rights and empowerment by providing them with resources that can help transform their lives. She is a humanitarian leader with a passion for working within philanthropy and helping the underserved community of Nigeria.

In 2016, Aisha founded the Egwafin MicroFinance Bank which helps those in Nigeria get the access they need to funding and financing that they may not have had access to otherwise. In 2018, she founded the Women Enterprise Alliance ( WenA), a platform that helps entrepreneurs through investing in profitable early stage companies, small & medium enterprises (SMEs) in Nigeria and across Africa.

Aisha is also the founder of ApA (Accountable Partners for Africa).

== Honors ==
- Gold Medal Award from the Crans Montana Forum Brussels
- Womens Champion and Youth Mentor Award
- Speaker at the World Humanitarian Forum on Gender Equality and Women Empowerment
- Life Member at the Chartered Institute of Director, Nigeria
- Founder's Award by Women Enterprise Alliance. This prestigious Award recognizes and honors the achievements of outstanding founders in Nigeria across various business categories, as well as business support organizations.

== Online Publications ==
- Mobile Money becomes available in Nigeria
- Technology should enhance communication skills
- Building Business Acumen Through Emotional Intelligence
