= Margaret Shonekan =

First Lady of Nigeria in 1993

First Lady of Nigeria
- In role 26 August 1993 – 17 November 1993
- Head of State: Ernest Shonekan
- Preceded by: Maryam Babangida
- Succeeded by: Maryam Abacha

Federal Civil Service Commissioner
- In office 1 October 1986 – 31 March 1994

Personal details
- Born: 28 October 1941 (age 85) Gusau, Northern Region, British Nigeria (now Gusau, Zamfara State, Nigeria)
- Spouse: Ernest Shonekan

Margaret O. Shonekan (born 28 October 1941) is a Nigerian civil servant, she spent much of her career with the West African Examinations Council (WAEC). She was appointed a Federal Civil Service Commissioner from 1 October 1986 until 31 March 1994. She also briefly served as the First Lady of Nigeria from 26 August 1993 until 17 November 1993, during the transitional presidency of her husband, Ernest Shonekan.

== Biography ==
Margaret Shonekan was born on 28 October 1941 in Gusau, British Nigeria, in present-day Zamfara State. Her parents were Yoruba who had moved from South West Nigeria to Gusau during the late 1930s, where her father worked as a teacher for the Church Mission Society. She attended elementary school at Christ Church Anglican Primary School in Gusau and Peter's Primary School in Minna. She then attended Anglican Girls' School in Orita-Mefa, Ibadan, for one year before enrolling at Anglican Girls' Secondary School in Ilesa (now called St. Margaret's School) from 1954 until 1958. Sheonekan attended Ibadan Grammar School from January 1959 until December 1960.

Shonekan enrolled at University College Ibadan (now called the University of Ibadan) from 1961 until June 1965, when she graduated with Bachelor's of Arts honors degree in history. She later obtained a post-graduate diploma in administration and management from St. Godric's College in London in 1968.

Margaret Shonekan was hired as a Trainee Assistant Registrar by the West African Examinations Council (WAEC) on 1 October 1965. She worked for the WAEC for the majority of her professional career. Shonekan was later appointed deputy registrar of the WAEC from 1 April 1982 until 30 September 1986.

In 1986, Margaret Shonekan left the WAEC upon her appointment to the Federal Civil Service Commission, which oversees the civil service, by the Federal Government of Nigeria. She served as a Federal Civil Service Commissioner from 1 October 1986 until 31 March 1994.

In 1993, Shonekan's husband, Ernest Shonekan, became interim, transitional President of Nigeria. Margaret Shonekan served as First Lady of Nigeria for just 82 days from 26 August 1993 until 17 November 1993. The Shonekan's presidency was cut short when General Sani Abacha staged a coup and overthrew Shonekan on 17 November 1993.

Shonekan rejoined the West African Examinations Council (WAEC) on 1 April 1994 as its senior deputy. She was then hired as the WAEC's Head of National Office on 30 October 1995, defeating five male colleagues who also sought the position. Shonekan served as the Head of National Office at WAEC from 30 October 1995 until her retirement on 30 September 2000. She described her time as Head of National Office as her most difficult years with the WAEC, due to the examination board's lack of adequate funding and its empty treasury at the time. She retired from the WAEC in 2000.

Honorary titles
Preceded by Maryam Babangida	First Lady of Nigeria; 26 August 1993 – 17 November 1993	Succeeded by Maryam Abacha
