= Chukwuma Azikiwe =

Nigerian politician (1940–2015)

- Born: Chukwuma Bamidele Azikiwe; February 1940
- Died: 10 May 2015 (aged 75); Onitsha, Anambra State
- Education: Harvard College, Harvard Business School
- Occupations: Politician; businessman
- Title: Owelle-Osowa-Anya of Onitsha
- Parents: Nnamdi Azikiwe; Flora Azikiwe
- Relatives: Deborah Adadevoh (cousin)

Chief Chukwuma Bamidele Azikiwe (February 1940 – 10 May 2015) was a Nigerian diplomat and political figure. He was the second Owelle-Osowa-Anya of Onitsha and the eldest son of President Nnamdi Azikiwe, the first holder of the chieftaincy.

== Education and political career ==
Azikiwe studied at Harvard College where he participated in track and field (broad jump) and graduated in 1963. He then graduated from Harvard Business School in 1964. He ran unsuccessfully for the Social Democratic Party Anambra State gubernatorial nomination in 1991. After his father died in 1996, he succeeded him as the second Owelle-Osowa-Anya of Onitsha.

== Death ==
Azikiwe died at Borommeo Hospital in Onitsha on 10 May 2015 at the age of 75. He is said to have suffered from respiratory ailments prior to his death. While the Nigerian federal government indicated interest to give him a state burial in which the burial activities were coordinated through some Nigeria State Governors (Lagos, Anambra, Enugu, Oyo, and Kaduna states) at that period, the burial was sponsored by the Anambra State Government.
