= Better Life Program for the African Rural Woman =

Non-profit organisation in Nigeria

- Formation: 1987
- Founder: Maryam Babangida
- Type: NGO
- Legal status: CAC
- Headquarters: Abuja
- Location: Nigeria
- Key people: Aisha Babangida, (Chairperson)
- Website: www.betterlife-africa.org -

The Better Life Program for the African Rural Woman or BLPARW is a non-profit organisation which was initiated by the late Maryam Babangida, in September 1987 in Nigeria. She was the wife of former Military President of Nigeria, Ibrahim Babangida.

The vision of the program is to see an emergence of a well informed, economical and socio-politically empowered African woman participating effectively in the process of National development. The current Chairperson of the Better Life Program for the African Rural Woman is Aisha Babangida, the first daughter of Late Maryam Babangida.

== The Program ==
Maryam Ibrahim Babangida held consultations with various stakeholders such as the Directorate for Food and Rural Infrastructure and women organizations about economic and social constraints affecting rural women. In 1986, she visited two villages close to Lagos, Igbologun and Ilado-Odo. The villages did not have clean water and power distribution infrastructure. The visit confirmed her understanding that more actions should be directed towards rural development. In 1987, a workshop on the role of rural women in development was held in Abuja and led to the establishment of Better Life Program for the Rural Woman.

Currently the organisation has recently developed a new strategy which will be implemented over the next five years to ensure rural women in Nigeria and Africa are supported and empowered.

== Projects ==
BLPARW projects are community-based initiatives aimed at supporting women in African communities in forming organized and collaborative working groups. These projects adopt structured approaches to address shared challenges and improve group effectiveness and sustainability.

=== Agriculture ===
BLPARW developed strategies to mobilized rural women farmers to produce marketable, scalable and exportable food crops that have nutritional and national development values. Crops such as cassava for starch production and grain produce, shea butter, fonio, rice, etc. Women farmers are encouraged to unite under the cooperative societies to increase access to credit and land grants, extension services and technology.

=== Cottage Industry ===
The African rural woman working within the cottage industry is often characterized by her hard work and labor-intensive efforts. She typically runs a small-scale production business, mostly operated from her home, rather than a purpose-built facility. BLPARW supports her journey by enhancing her production line.

=== Adult and Financial Literacy Programs ===
Helping African women develop and improve their ability to read and write. Building their self-esteem and self-confidence. Helping women achieve proficiency in personal and business finance, as well as investment decisions. Providing the knowledge and skills required to make appropriate financial decisions, create budget and the ability to track spending.

=== Health Outreach Program ===
BLPARW through its initiative Sauki, a health outreach program improves the access African rural women and their children have to superior health and as a result promote the wellness in Africa’s rural communities. The platform organizes community outreach programs twice a year to address basic problems such as lack of health screenings. The medical practitioners within BLPARW conduct assessments, make recommendations including setting individual health and wellness goals.

== Organizational structure ==
After the relaunch of BLPARW, the organization is managed by the board of trustees, management team, led by the MD/CEO with a strong routine of field volunteer as well as various technical partners.

== See also ==
- Tech Herfrica
