= Christopher E. Abebe =

Nigerian businessman

Christopher Abebe

Christopher Ebhodaghe Abebe (18 July 1919 – 22 March 2018) OFR, KSM, KSS, known as "Pa Abebe", was a Nigerian human resources executive and later managing director of the United Africa Company (UAC) in Nigeria.

== Early life and family ==
Christopher Abebe was born in 1919. His eldest daughter, Stella Obasanjo, was the wife of the former president of Nigeria, Olusegun Obasanjo.

== Career ==
Abebe spent his whole career at the United Africa Company, beginning as an accounts clerk at Uromi in 1935. In 1951 he became the labour manager at Warri, the first indigenous African in the UAC to be appointed to that position. In 1958 he was appointed manager for African staff development and training for Nigeria and the following year became the first indigenous African to be appointed to the board of directors of UAC Nigeria. He became deputy chairman in 1972 and chairman and managing director in 1975.

He retired in 1980 and was appointed an officer of the Order of the Federal Republic of Nigeria in 1981.

== Other activities ==
He was Pro-Chancellor and Chairman of Council of three Nigerian universities (Benin, Nsukka and Calabar).

== Death ==
Abebe died on 22 March 2018.
