= Stella Obasanjo =

First Lady of Nigeria (1999–2005)

Stella Abebe Obasanjo

First Lady of Nigeria
- In role 29 May 1999 – 23 October 2005
- President: Olusegun Obasanjo
- Preceded by: Fati Lami Abubakar
- Succeeded by: Turai Yar'Adua

First Lady of African Union
- In role 11 July 2004 – 23 October 2005
- President: Olusegun Obasanjo
- Preceded by: Marcelina Rafael Chissano
- Succeeded by: Antoinette Sassou Nguesso (2006)

Personal details
- Born: Stella Abebe; 14 November 1945 Esan, Southern Region, British Nigeria (now in Edo State, Nigeria)
- Died: 23 October 2005 (aged 59) Puerto Banús, Marbella, Spain
- Spouse: Olusegun Obasanjo (m. 1976)
- Children: Olumuyiwa Obasanjo (b. 1977)
- Parent(s): Dr. Christopher Abebe (father); Theresa Abebe (mother)
- Education: University of Ife

Stella Obasanjo (née Abebe; 14 November 1945 – 23 October 2005) was the First Lady of Nigeria from 1999 until her death. She was the wife of former President Olusegun Obasanjo, although she was not the First Lady in 1976, when Obasanjo was military head of state. She died while undergoing elective liposuction abroad.

She was a political activist in her own right, supporting causes such as women's liberation, youth as leaders of tomorrow, and the rehabilitation of a war-torn Nigeria.

== Early life and education ==
Stella Abebe was born on 14 November 1945, she was from Iruekpen, Esan West, Edo State. Her father, Dr. Christopher Abebe, was chief of the United Africa Company (UAC) who became the first indigenous (African) chairman of UAC Nigeria.

She began her education at Our Lady of the Apostles Primary School. She enrolled at St. Theresa's College, where she obtained her West African School Certificate in 1964 with grade one. Two years later she obtained the higher school certificate. She was admitted to the University of Ife (now Obafemi Awolowo University), Ile-Ife, for a bachelor's degree in English, attending from 1967 to 1969. In 1969 she transferred to the UK to complete her studies, this time round, in insurance, in London and Edinburgh, Scotland, from 1970 to 1974.

She completed her education with a certificate as confidential secretary from Pitman College in 1976. She returned to Nigeria in 1976.

== Personal life ==
She married General Obasanjo with whom she had one son; Olumuyiwa Obasanjo born in 1977. Olusegun Obasanjo had just become Head of State and Commander-in-Chief of the Nigerian Armed Forces, following the assassination of General Muritala Mohammed.

== First Lady of Nigeria ==
When she became Nigeria's First Lady in 1999, following the election of her husband as president, Obasanjo established Child Care Trust, for the care of underprivileged and/or disabled children.

As First Lady of Nigeria, Obasanjo joined the Campaign Against Female Genital Mutilation and on 6 February 2003, she declared the day the International Day of Zero Tolerance to Female Genital Mutilation. Reporters Without Borders reported that Orobosa Omo-Ojo, the publisher of the Lagos-based Nigerian Midwest Herald, was arrested on Stella Obasanjo's orders on 2 May 2005 and taken to Akure prison. His arrest was prompted by an article the previous week about her, headlined "Greedy Stella".

== Death ==
Stella Obasanjo died at age 59 from complications of cosmetic surgery at a private health clinic in Puerto Banús, Marbella, Spain, on 23 October 2005. The surgeon, identified only as "AM" in court, was sentenced to one year of imprisonment in September 2009 on a charge of "causing homicide through negligence", disqualified from medicine for a period of three years and ordered to pay €120,000 (approximately US$176,000) in compensation to Stella Obasanjo's son. Prosecutors had requested a two-year jail term and five-year disqualification. A request for compensation for the Nigerian government was also rejected. The physician had misplaced a tube designed for a liposuction procedure into Stella's abdominal cavity. She sustained a punctured colon and lacerated liver and died two days after the surgery. The doctor did not immediately answer his mobile phone when called after performing the operation and reportedly left Stella for four hours. Had she been hospitalised in time, it is thought she might have survived her injuries.

Honorary titles
Preceded by Fati Lami Abubakar	First Lady of Nigeria; 29 May 1999 – 23 October 2005	Succeeded by Turai Yar'Adua
