= Hadiza Shagari =

First Lady of Nigeria (1979–1983)

First Lady of Nigeria
- In role 1 October 1979 – 31 December 1983
- President: Shehu Shagari
- Preceded by: Esther Oluremi Obasanjo
- Succeeded by: Safinatu Buhari

Personal details
- Born: Hadiza Dawaiya; 1940 or 1941
- Died: 12 August 2021 (aged 80) Abuja, Nigeria
- Spouse: Shehu Shagari (m. 1957; died 2018)

Hadiza Dawaiya Shagari, also known as Hadiza Shehu Shagari (1940/41 – 12 August 2021) was a Nigerian public figure, former First Lady of Nigeria from 1979 to 1983, and widow of Shehu Shagari.

Together with Shehu Shagari's other two wives, Hadiza Shagari served as First Lady of Nigeria when her husband assumed the presidency from 1 October 1979 to 31 December 1983.

== Biography ==
Hadiza Dawaiya met her husband, Shehu Shagari, while he was working as a visiting teacher and Federal Scholarship Board member in Sokoto province (present-day Sokoto State). They married in 1957.

Hadiza Shagari died from complications of COVID-19 at the Gwagwalada Isolation Center in Abuja at approximately 3 a.m. on 12 August 2021. She was 80 years old. Her funeral was held at the Abuja National Mosque on 12 August at 4 p.m. Her husband, former President Shehu Shagari, died in 2018.

Honorary titles
Preceded by Esther Oluremi Obasanjo	First Lady of Nigeria; 1 October 1979 – 31 December 1983	Succeeded by Safinatu Buhari
