= Maryam Abacha =

First Lady of Nigeria (1993–1998)

First Lady of Nigeria
- In role 17 November 1993 – 8 June 1998
- Head of State: Sani Abacha
- Preceded by: Margaret Shonekan
- Succeeded by: Fati Lami Abubakar

Personal details
- Born: Maryam Jidah; 4 March 1947 (age 79) Kaduna, Northern Region, British Nigeria (now Kaduna, Kaduna State, Nigeria)
- Spouse: Sani Abacha
- Children: 10
- Parents: Mahammad Jidah (father); Nana Jiddah (mother)

Maryam Abacha (born 4 March 1947) is the widow of Sani Abacha, Nigeria's military ruler from 1993 to 1998.

== Early life and career ==
In 1999, Maryam Abacha said that her husband acted in the good will of Nigeria. A Nigerian government official said that Maryam Abacha said that to convince the government to grant her a reprieve, as the president, Olusegun Obasanjo, had been jailed by Sani Abacha. After the death of her husband, Maryam was caught while attempting to leave Nigeria with 38 suitcases filled with cash. As of 2000, Maryam Abacha remained in Nigeria and continued to proclaim the innocence of her husband despite several human right abuses attributed to him. She resides in Kano state, Nigeria.

Maryam and Sani Abacha had three daughters and seven sons. Maryam Abacha's eldest surviving son is Mohammed Abacha.

Maryam Abacha founded National Hospital Abuja (originally known as the National Hospital For Women And Children) and established the African First Ladies Peace Mission.

== Bibliography ==
- Kabir, Hajara Muhammad,. Northern women development. [Nigeria]. ISBN 978-978-906-469-4. OCLC 890820657.

Honorary titles
Preceded by Margaret Shonekan	First Lady of Nigeria; 17 November 1993 – 8 June 1998	Succeeded by Fati Lami Abubakar
