= Zaphaniah Jisalo =

Nigerian politician

Zaphaniah Jisalo MFR

Minister of Special Duties and Inter-Governmental Affairs
- Incumbent
- Assumed office July 2023

Member of the House of Representatives of Nigeria from FCT-Abuja
- In office 2011–2019
- Constituency: Abuja Municipal/Bwari

Personal details
- Born: Zaphaniah Bitrus Jisalo; 3 April 1970 (age 56) Abuja, Nigeria
- Citizenship: Nigeria
- Education: University of Jos; Thames Valley University
- Occupation: Politician

Zaphaniah Bitrus Jisalo MFR is a Nigerian politician. He is currently the Federal Minister for Special Duties and Inter-Governmental Affairs. He was a two-term member representing Abuja Municipal/Bwari Constituency in the House of Representatives.

== Early life ==
Zaphaniah Bitrus Jisalo was born on 3 April 1970 in Abuja. He hails from Garki Village in Suleja/Abuja Municipal Council.

== Education ==
He completed his elementary education at Garki Primary School, Abuja in 1982 before obtaining his West African Senior Certificate (WASC) from Government Secondary School Karu in 1988. He bagged a Bachelor’s degree in Education, Diploma in Criminal Justice and Administration, and an Advanced Diploma in Applied Psychology, all from University of Jos, Plateau State. He graduated with a Diploma in Public Relations from the Institute of Mass Communication and Technology in 1992. He proceeded to study Government Policies, Planning and Implementation at the Thames Valley University in London, United Kingdom.

== Political career ==
Jisalo’s tenure as Public Affairs Officer at the Independent National Electoral Commission (INEC) spanned 1990 – 2002, a period of twelve (12) years. He served as the Chairman, Abuja Municipal Area Council (AMAC) from 2004 to 2010. In 2011, he succeeded Austen Peters-Pam Amanda to make his first term into the House of Representatives as a member representing Abuja Municipal/Bwari Constituency, and was re-elected in 2015 for a second term. As a legislator, he served in various House Committees, including Defense, NDDC, Sports, Appropriations, Customs & Excise, National Security, and FCT Area Councils, driving legislative initiatives. In 2023, he was appointed Minister for Special Duties and Inter-governmental Affairs under the President Bola Ahmed Tinubu administration.

== Awards and honors ==
- Member of the Order of the Federal Republic (MFR)
- Best Local Government Chairman of FCT, 2006
- Overall Best Chairman in Nigeria, 2006
- Dr. Kwame Nkrumah Africa Leadership Award
