= Ajoke Muhammed =

First Lady of Nigeria from 1975 to 1976

First Lady of Nigeria
- In role 29 July 1975 – 13 February 1976
- Head of State: Murtala Muhammed
- Preceded by: Victoria Gowon
- Succeeded by: Esther Oluremi Obasanjo

Personal details
- Born: 23 May 1941 (age 85) Kano, Northern Region, British Nigeria (now in Kano State, Nigeria)
- Spouse: Murtala Muhammed (m. 1963; assassinated 1976)
- Children: 6, including Aisha
- Relatives: Ireti Kingibe (sister)

Hafsatu Ajoke Muhammed (born 23 May 1941) is a Nigerian conservationist and the fourth First Lady of Nigeria. She is the widow of General Murtala Muhammed who was Nigerian Head of State from 29 July 1975 to 13 February 1976.

== Biography ==
She was born on 23 May 1941 in British Nigeria. Ajoke married Murtala Muhammed in 1963.

She trained as a dental therapist but developed an interest in plants. She set up the Murtala Muhammed Memorial Botanical Garden, a 30-hectare garden along the Lekki–Epe Expressway in Lagos in 1991. She also owns a 20-hectare garden in Abuja named Sarius Palmetum and Botanic Garden.

She has five living children and launched the Murtala Muhammed Foundation in memory of her husband alongside his family.

Honorary titles
Preceded by Victoria Gowon	First Lady of Nigeria; 29 July 1975 – 13 February 1976	Succeeded by Esther Oluremi Obasanjo
