= Asabe Vilita Bashir =

Nigerian politician (born 1965)

Member of the House of Representatives from Borno State
- In office 2015–2019

Personal details
- Born: 19 February 1965 (age 61) Borno State, Nigeria
- Party: APC
- Education: University of Maiduguri

Asabe Vilita Bashir (born 19 February 1965) is a Nigerian politician. She was elected to the Nigerian House of Representatives as a candidate of the ruling party APC in the federal constituency of Gwoza, Chibok and Damboa, Borno State, in the 8th National Assembly. She particularly advocates for women and children, especially victims of Boko Haram insurgency.

== Education ==
Bashir received her GCE certificate from the Federal Government College at Maiduguri in 1984. She then enrolled at the University of Maiduguri to study education. She earned a BSc in Education in 1988, an MEd in Administration and Planning in 1992, and a PhD in Philosophy in 2002.

== Career ==
Bashir served as a member of Nigeria's Federal House of Representatives, representing the Gwoza, Chibok and Damboa federal constituencies in Borno State, from 2015 to 2019. She advocates project that will improve the lives of Boko Haram insurgency victims, especially women and children.

In 2021, she was appointed the Director General of the National Centre for Women Development by President Muhammadu Buhari.
