= Victoria Gowon =

First Lady of Nigeria (1969–1975)

Victoria Gowon CFR
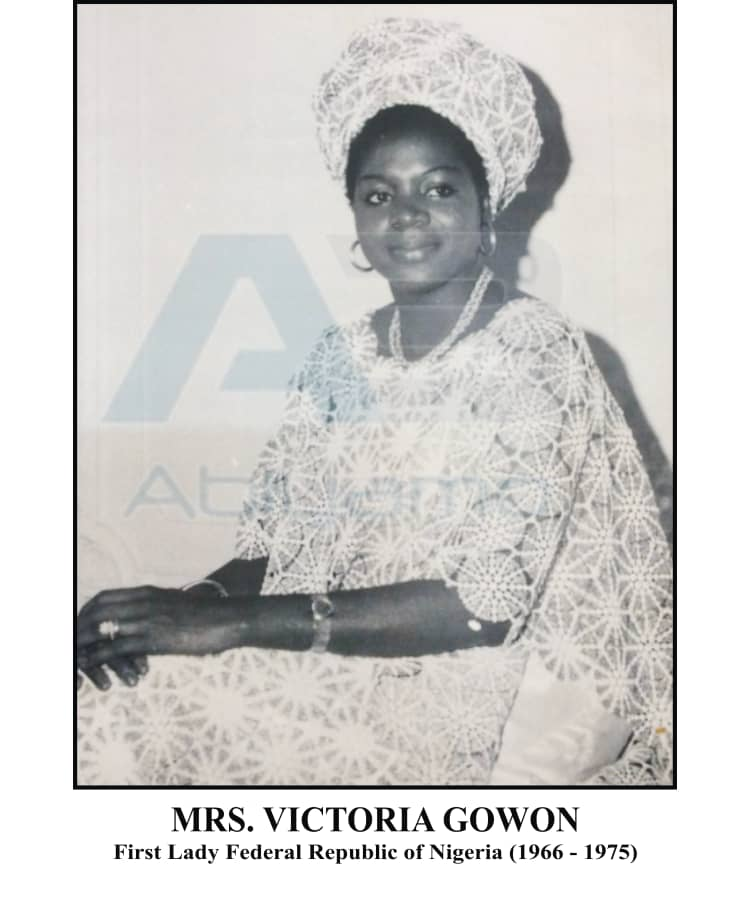

First Lady of Nigeria
- In role 19 April 1969 – 29 July 1975
- Head of State: Yakubu Gowon
- Preceded by: Victoria Aguiyi-Ironsi
- Succeeded by: Ajoke Muhammed

Personal details
- Born: Victoria Hansatu Zakari; 22 August 1946 (age 80) Zaria, Northern Region, British Nigeria (now Zaria, Kaduna State, Nigeria)
- Spouse: Yakubu Gowon (m. 1969)

Victoria Hansatu Gowon (born 22 August 1946) is a Nigerian nurse and the third first lady of Nigeria. She is married to General Yakubu Gowon who was Nigerian Head of State from 1966 to 1975.

== Biography ==
Victoria Hansatu Zakari was born on 22 August 1946 to Malam Walter Bala, a civil servant and Lydia Fati Zakari in Zaria. She attended primary and secondary school in both Zaria and Kaduna. She completed her secondary education in 1964. She attended school of Nursing at the University College Hospital, Ibadan and qualified as a registered nurse in July 1968. She married Yakubu Gowon during the Nigerian Civil War on 19 April 1969 in a ceremony held at Cathedral Church of Christ, Lagos.

She made public appearances because Yakubu Gowon combined his executive and ceremonial duties.

Her style as first lady was described as simple as she was often dressed in traditional attire.

Honorary titles
Preceded by Victoria Aguiyi-Ironsi	First Lady of Nigeria; 1 August 1966 – 29 July 1975	Succeeded by Ajoke Muhammed
