= Flora Azikiwe =

First Lady of Nigeria (1963–1966)

First Lady of Nigeria
- In role 1 October 1963 – 16 January 1966
- President: Nnamdi Azikiwe
- Preceded by: position established
- Succeeded by: Victoria Aguiyi-Ironsi

Personal details
- Born: Flora Ogbenyeanu Ogoegbunam; 7 August 1917 Onitsha, Southern Region, British Nigeria
- Died: 22 August 1983 (aged 66)
- Spouse: Nnamdi Azikiwe (m. 1936)
- Children: Chukwuma Azikiwe, Chukwuemeka Azikiwe, Nwachukwu Azikiwe, Ngozi Azikiwe

Flora Ogbenyeanu Ogoegbunam Azikiwe (7 August 1917 – 22 August 1983) was the first wife of Nnamdi Azikiwe, the first President of Nigeria. She served as the first First Lady of Nigeria from 1 October 1963 to 16 January 1966.

Flora Ogbenyeanu Ogoegbunam was born in Onitsha, a city in present-day Anambra State to Chief Ogoegbunam, the Adazia of Onitsha (Ndichie Chief) from Ogboli Agbor Onitsha. She met Nnamdi Azikiwe there in 1934, and the two were married on 4 April 1936. Their wedding was held at Wesley Church James Town, Accra, Gold Coast (present-day Ghana) where her husband was working as the editor of African Morning Post at the time.

Azikiwe was a member of the Eastern Working Committee of the National Council of Nigeria and the Cameroons (NCNC). She was the first Patron of the Home Science Association (HSA), formerly known as Federal Home Science Association.

On 22 August 1983, Azikiwe died at the age of 66. She and her husband had one daughter and three sons.

Honorary titles
Preceded by position established	First Lady of Nigeria; 1 October 1963 – 16 January 1966	Succeeded by Victoria Aguiyi-Ironsi
