= First Lady of Nigeria =

Informal title held by the spouse of the president of Nigeria

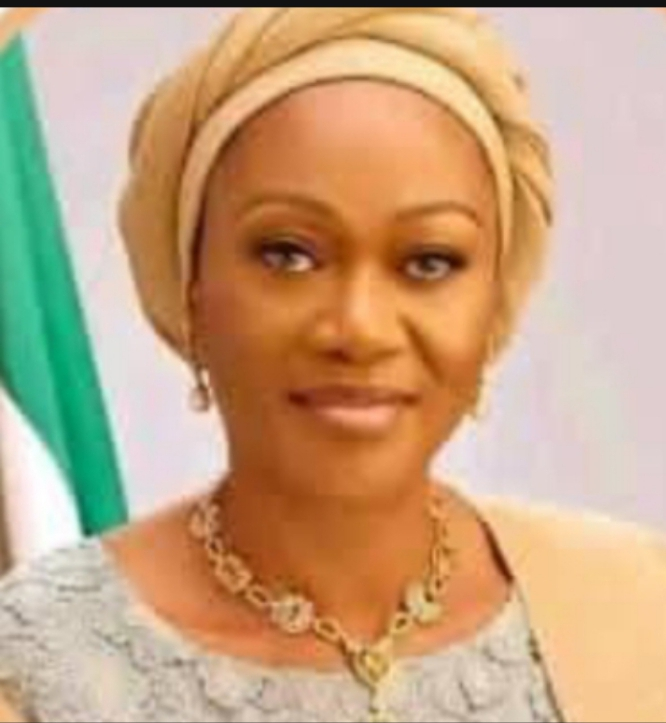
- Incumbent; Oluremi Tinubu since 29 May 2023
- Inaugural holder: Flora Azikiwe
- Formation: 1963

The first lady of Nigeria is an informal, but accepted title, held by the wife of the president of Nigeria. The current first lady is Oluremi Tinubu who has held the title since 29 May 2023.

The Constitution of Nigeria does not create an office for the country's first lady or potential first gentleman. However, official funding and staff have been allocated to the first lady of Nigeria since the country's independence. The first lady is addressed by the title Her Excellency.

== History ==
Stella Obasanjo is the only Nigerian first lady to have died in office.

== First ladies of Nigeria ==
| No. | Image | Name | Term begins | Term ends | President or Head of State |
|---|---|---|---|---|---|
| 1 | | Flora Azikiwe (1917–1983) | 1 October 1963 | 16 January 1966 | Nnamdi Azikiwe |
| 2 | | Victoria Aguiyi-Ironsi (1923–2021) | 16 January 1966 | 29 July 1966 | Johnson Aguiyi-Ironsi |
| 3 | | Victoria Gowon (1946–) | 1 August 1966 | 29 July 1975 | Yakubu Gowon |
| 4 | | Ajoke Muhammed(1941–) | 29 July 1975 | 13 February 1976 | Murtala Mohammed |
| 5 | | Esther Oluremi Obasanjo (1941–) | 13 February 1976 | 1 October 1979 | Olusegun Obasanjo |
| 6 | | Hadiza Shagari (1940/1941–2021) | 1 October 1979 | 31 December 1983 | Shehu Shagari |
| 7 | | Safinatu Buhari (1952–2006) | 31 December 1983 | 27 August 1985 | Muhammadu Buhari |
| 8 | | Maryam Babangida (1948–2009) | 27 August 1985 | 26 August 1993 | Ibrahim Babangida |
| 9 | | Margaret Shonekan (1941–) | 26 August 1993 | 17 November 1993 | Ernest Shonekan |
| 10 | | Maryam Abacha (1949–) | 17 November 1993 | 8 June 1998 | Sani Abacha |
| 11 | | Fati Lami Abubakar (1951–) | 8 June 1998 | 29 May 1999 | Abdulsalami Abubakar |
| 12 | | Stella Obasanjo (1945–2005) | 29 May 1999 | 23 October 2005 (Died in office) | Olusegun Obasanjo |
| Vacant (1 year, 218 days) | | | | | Olusegun Obasanjo |
| 13 | | Turai Yar'Adua (1957–) | 29 May 2007 | 5 May 2010 | Umaru Musa Yar'Adua |
| 14 | | Patience Jonathan (1957–) | 6 May 2010 | 29 May 2015 | Goodluck Jonathan |
| 15 | | Aisha Buhari (1971–) | 29 May 2015 | 29 May 2023 | Muhammadu Buhari |
| 16 | | Oluremi Tinubu (1960–) | 29 May 2023 | Present | Bola Tinubu |
