= Dayo Benjamins-Laniyi =

Nigerian politician (born 1965)

Adedayo Benjamins-Laniyi

Mandate Secretary, FCTA Women Affairs Secretariat
- Incumbent
- Assumed office 24 October 2023
- President: Bola Tinubu
- Preceded by: position established

Personal details
- Born: Adedayo Benjamins-Laniyi; 16 October 1965 (age 60)
- Party: All Progressives Congress
- Spouse: Pastor Tunde Benjamins-Laniyi
- Children: 4
- Education: University of Ibadan
- Occupation: Politician, Gender Based Activist
- Website: adedayobenjaminslaniyi.com

Adedayo Benjamins-Laniyi (née Olumide, born 1965) is a women rights activist, master of ceremony and serving politician under Nigeria's ruling party, All Progressives Congress (APC). In 2023 she was appointed by President Bola Tinubu as Mandate Secretary to head the newly created Federal Capital Territory Administration's (FCTA) Women Affairs Secretariat. She is the Grand Matron of ‘Hope Again for FCT Women in Politics', and has played a vital role in encouraging and mentoring women in the political arena in Nigeria.

== Early life and education ==
Adedayo Benjamins-Laniyi was born in 1965 and hails from Ogun State and holds a dual nativity, as her mother is from Trinidad. She attended Queens College, Lagos for her secondary school education and is a 1989 graduate of English from the University of Ibadan.

She founded a media event and lifestyle organization named Doxa Group, and also worked as a TV host on Ask Aunty D which aired on Christian Broadcasting Network.

She is an ordained Pastor in Redeemed Christian Church of God and is married to Pastor Tunde Benjamins-Laniyi, the Pastor of RCCG Throne Room Transcorp Hilton, Abuja. She has four children.

== Political career ==
In APC, she was among the four who contested primaries to represent the Federal Capital Territory in 2022, but she lost as first runner up to Angulu Zakari—former House of Representatives member for Abaji/Gwagwalada/Kwali/Kuje by 81% margin.

In 2023, she was appointed Mandate Secretary by President Bola Ahmed Tinubu.

== Controversies ==
As the annual host of The Experience hosted by House on the Rock, Dayo Benjamins-Laniyi who at the time was a senator aspirant in APC while introducing former Anambra state governor and Labor Party presidential candidate Peter Obi stated that her introduction was political and not personal. The controversial introduction was discussed extensively on social media as different group discussed if it was necessary or not as the event was apolitical, considering they were from opposing parties.

== Recognitions ==
In 2020, she received recognition from for the impact of her Dream Girls project where she impacted over 500 girls in the institution

Benjamins-Laniyi is Fellow of the Institute of Chartered Management Consultants and Certified Management Consultant.
