= Ireti Kingibe =

Nigerian politician (born 1954)

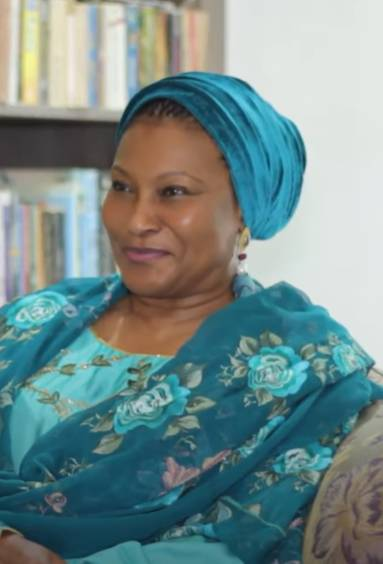
- Kingibe in a 2023 interview with Voice of America

Senator for FCT
- Incumbent
- Assumed office 13 June 2023
- Preceded by: Philips Tanimu Aduda

Personal details
- Born: 2 June 1954 (age 72)
- Party: Labour Party (2022–present)
- Other political affiliations: Social Democratic Party (1990–1993); All Nigeria Peoples Party (1998–2006); Peoples Democratic Party (2006–2014); All Progressives Congress (2014–2022)
- Spouse: Baba Gana Kingibe
- Relatives: Ajoke Muhammed (sister); Murtala Muhammed (brother-in-law); Aisha Muhammed (niece)
- Education: Emotan Preparatory School; Queen's College Lagos; Washington Irving High School; University of Minnesota
- Occupation: Politician; civil engineer

Ireti Heebah Kingibe (born 2 June 1954) is a Nigerian civil engineer and politician. She was elected member of the senate representing the FCT in the 2023 Nigerian Senate elections under the Labour Party. She is a younger sister of Ajoke Muhammed, the wife of former Nigerian head of state Murtala Muhammed.

== Early life and education ==
Kingibe's education started at Emotan Preparatory School in 1966, after which she attended Queen's College Lagos from 1966 to 1967 and Washington Irving High School from 1970 to 1973 for her secondary school education. She bagged a degree in civil engineering from the University of Minnesota. between 1975 and 1980

== Career ==
Kingibe started her career as a quality control engineer with Bradley Precast Concrete Inc. from 1978 to 1979. She then moved on to work with the Minnesota Department of Transportation Design unit, where she also worked as an engineer from 1979 to 1991. She returned to Nigeria for her one-year mandatory service year between 1981 and 1982. She was posted to work as a project supervisor with the Nigerian Air Force base in Ikeja, Lagos.

In 1982 she got to work with the New Nigeria Construction Company, Kaduna, as a planning engineer. In 1985, she left New Nigeria Construction Company to work as a consultant for Belsam Limited.

Kingibe then became the regional engineer for Lodigiani Nigeria Limited Lagos between 1990 and 1994.

She currently works as a senior partner with Kelnic Associates, Abuja.

== Politics ==
Kingibe's political career began in 1990 with her appointment as adviser to the national chairman of the defunct Social Democratic Party (SDP).

In 2003 she was the FCT senatorial candidate for the All Nigeria Peoples Party. She defected to the Peoples Democratic Party in 2006. However, in 2014 she joined the All Progressive Congress (APC) because she could not handle the politics in PDP. In 2015 she ran for the senatorial seat under APC, but she later withdrew.

Kingibe joined the Labour Party in 2022, became its FCT senatorial candidate, and won the 2023 Nigerian Senate election. Before the elections, she pledged her basic salary (if she should win) to a special fund to tackle infrastructural deficits in the rural communities within the nation's capital.

She was named the Chairman of the Senate Committee on Women Affairs in the 10th Senate on 8 August 2023.

== Controversy ==
On Tuesday, 28 February 2023, The Independent National Electoral Commission (INEC) declared Kingibe the winner of the Federal Capital Territory as announced by the returning officer Sanni Saka; the agent of other political parties did not agree to the authenticity of the results and decided not to sign the result sheet. Kingibe held a press conference arguing that INEC had no basis for canceling an election she won and defeated the three-term Senator Philip Aduda. At the press conference, she claimed that opposition parties bribed electoral officers during the presidential and National assembly elections. She also claimed that there was an alleged move to rig her out of the election and that the Gwarinpa collation centre was attacked by thugs who destroyed the result sheets.
