= Maryam Babangida =

First lady of Nigeria (1985–1993)

First Lady of Nigeria
- In role August 27, 1985 – August 26, 1993
- President: Ibrahim Babangida
- Preceded by: Safinatu Buhari
- Succeeded by: Margaret Shonekan

Personal details
- Born: Maria Ndidi Okogwu; November 1, 1948 Asaba, Southern Region, British Nigeria (now Asaba, Delta State, Nigeria)
- Died: December 27, 2009 (aged 61) Los Angeles, California, U.S.
- Spouse: Ibrahim Babangida (m. 1969)
- Children: Mohammed, Aminu, Aisha, Halima
- Education: La Salle Extension University (Chicago, Illinois, U.S.) (Diploma); NCR Institute in Lagos (Certificate in Computer Science)
- Profession: Activist

Maryam Babangida, born Maria Ndidi Okogwu, (November 1, 1948 – December 27, 2009) was the wife of General Ibrahim Badamasi Babangida, who was Nigeria's head of state from 1985 to 1993. Her husband was the target of criticism for rampant corruption during his regime. She was credited with creating the position of First Lady of Nigeria.

As first lady, she launched many programmes to improve the life of women. The "Maryam Phenomenon" became a celebrity and "an icon of beauty, fashion and style", a position she retained after her husband's exit from power.

== Early years ==
Maryam Ndidi Okogwu was born on November 1, 1948 in Asaba (present-day Delta State), where she attended her primary education. Her parents were Hajiya Asabe Halima Mohammed from the present Niger State, a Hausa, and Leonard Nwanonye Okogwu from Asaba, an Igbo. She later moved north to Kaduna where she attended Queen Amina's College Kaduna for her Secondary education. She graduated as a secretary at the Federal Training Centre, Kaduna. Later she obtained a diploma in secretarial studies from La Salle Extension University (Chicago, Illinois) and a Certificate in Computer Science from the NCR Institute in Lagos.

On September 6, 1969, shortly before her 21st birthday, she married Major Ibrahim Badamasi Babangida. They had four children, boys Mohammed and Aminu, and two girls, Aisha and Halima. After her husband became Chief of Army Staff in 1983, Maryam Babangida became President of the Nigerian Army Officers Wives Association (NAOWA). She was active in this role, launching schools, clinics, women's training centres and child day care centers.

Her hobbies were gardening, interior decoration, music, squash, badminton, collecting birds, philanthropic activities and reading.

== First lady ==
When her husband became head of state in 1985, Maryam Babangida moved with her children into Dodan Barracks in Lagos. She had to arrange for considerable renovations to make the rooms more suitable for formal receptions. Dodan barracks was one of the key locations seized in the April 1990 coup attempt by Gideon Orkar against Ibrahim Babangida, who was present in the barracks when the attack occurred, but managed to escape via a back route.

As First Lady of Nigeria between 1985 and 1993, she turned the ceremonial post into a champion for women's rural development. She founded the Better Life Programme for Rural Women in 1987 which launched many co-operatives, cottage industries, farms and gardens, shops and markets, women's centres and social welfare programs. The Maryam Babangida National Centre for Women's Development was established in 1993 for research, training, and to mobilize women towards self-emancipation.

She championed women issues vigorously. She reached out to the first ladies of other African countries to emphasize the effective role they can play in improving the lives of their people.

Her book, Home Front: Nigerian Army Officers and Their Wives, published in 1988, emphasized the value of the work that women perform in the home in support of their husbands, and has been criticized by feminists.

Working with the National Council for Women's Societies (NCWS), she had significant influence, helping gain support for programmes such as the unpopular SFEM (Special Foreign Exchange Market) program to cut subsidies, and to devalue and fix the currency. She also established a glamorous persona. Talking about the opening of the seven-day Better Life Fair in 1990, one journalist said "She was like a Roman empress on a throne, regal and resplendent in a stone-studded flowing outfit that defied description..." Women responded to her as a role model, and her appeal lasted long after her husband fell from power.

== Illness and death ==
On November 15, 2009, rumours circulated that the former first lady had died in her hospital bed at the University of California (UCLA) Jonsson Comprehensive Cancer Center in Los Angeles over complications arising from terminal ovarian cancer. However, an aide to the former president, said "Mrs Maryam Babangida is alive ... I told her about the spreading rumour in Nigeria concerning her death and she laughed, saying those carrying the rumour would die before her."

At 61 years old, Maryam died due to ovarian cancer on 27 December 2009 in a Los Angeles, California, hospital. Her husband was at her side as she died. President of the Senate of Nigeria, David Mark, was said to have broken down into tears upon hearing the news. On March 19, 2020, Governor Ifeanyi Okowa accompanied by Governor Aminu Waziri Tambuwal immortalised the memories of Maryam Babangida by commissioning the Maryam Babangida Way in Delta state capital, Asaba.

The Times of Nigeria reported on her death that she was "considered to be one of the greatest women in Africa today".

== Bibliography ==
- Maryam Babangida (1988). The home front: Nigerian army officers and their wives. Fountain Publications. ISBN 978-2679-48-8.

Honorary titles
Preceded by Safinatu Buhari	First Lady of Nigeria; 27 August 1985 – 26 August 1993	Succeeded by Margaret Shonekan
