= Safinatu Buhari =

First Lady of Nigeria (1983–1985)

Hajia Safinatu Buhari

First Lady of Nigeria
- In role 31 December 1983 – 27 August 1985
- Head of State: Muhammadu Buhari
- Preceded by: Hadiza Shagari
- Succeeded by: Maryam Babangida

Personal details
- Born: Safinatu Yusuf; 11 December 1952 Jos, Northern Region, British Nigeria (now Jos, Plateau State, Nigeria)
- Died: 14 January 2006 (aged 53)
- Spouse: Muhammadu Buhari (m. 1971; div. 1988)
- Children: 5

Safinatu Buhari (née Yusuf; 11 December 1952 – 14 January 2006) was a Nigerian teacher and First Lady of Nigeria from 1983 to 1985. She was the first wife of Muhammadu Buhari.

== Early life and education ==
Safinatu Yusuf was born on 11 December 1952 to Alhaji Yusufu Mani and Hajia Hadizatu Mani in Jos, Plateau State. She was from the Fula ethnic group of Northern Nigeria and hailed from Mani Local Government in Katsina State. She attended Tudun Wada primary school. Her family relocated to Lagos State when the then commissioner for Lagos affairs, Musa Yar'Adua appointed her father as his private secretary.

She enrolled at the Women Teacher's Training College in Katsina and received a Grade 2 Teachers Certificate in 1971. She was versed in Islamic education and was lettered in both English and Arabic.

== Personal life ==
She met Muhammadu Buhari at the age of 14 and they married in 1971 when she was 18. They had 5 children namely; Zulaihatu (deceased), Magajiya-Fatima, Hadizatu-Nana, Safinatu Lami and Musa (deceased). When Muhammadu Buhari's government was overthrown by Ibrahim Babangida, she relocated to Kaduna with her children. Following the military coup that removed Muhammadu Buhari as president on 27 August 1985, when he was released from prison, he divorced Safinatu shortly after; the reason for Buhari's divorce from his first wife has remained unknown. However, it is rumored that Safinatu was accused of receiving financial assistance from Babangida while her husband was imprisoned despite her husband's warning.

Safinatu Buhari was diagnosed with diabetes in 1998 in the Kingdom of Saudi Arabia.

Her style was both traditional and minimal. It portrayed her ethnic origin.

They divorced in 1988.

=== First Lady of Nigeria ===
Safinatu was the seventh First Lady of Nigeria from 31 December 1983 to 27 August 1985. She was largely unknown by Nigerians as she did not have her own office or personal staff in Dodan Barracks. She stayed out of the public eye but took up responsibility hosting visiting First Ladies.

== Death ==
Safinatu Buhari died 14 January 2006 as a result of diabetes-related complications at the age of 53.

Honorary titles
Preceded by Hadiza Shagari	First Lady of Nigeria; 31 December 1983 – 27 August 1985	Succeeded by Maryam Babangida
