= Aisha Buhari =

First Lady of Nigeria from 2015 to 2023

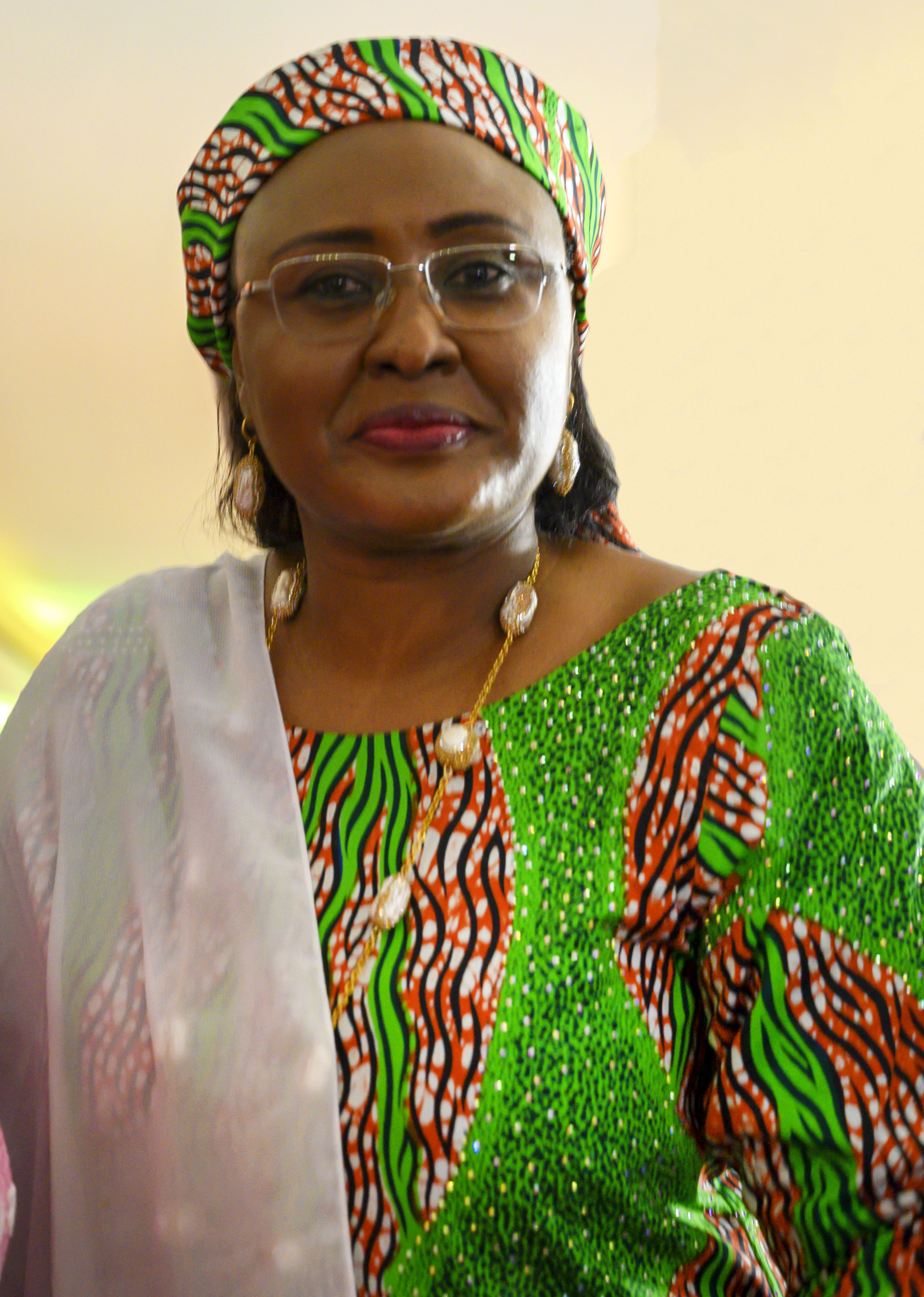

First Lady of Nigeria
- In role 29 May 2015 – 29 May 2023
- President: Muhammadu Buhari
- Preceded by: Patience Jonathan
- Succeeded by: Oluremi Tinubu

Personal details
- Born: Aisha Halilu; 17 February 1971 (age 55) Adamawa, Nigeria
- Party: All Progressives Congress
- Spouse: Muhammadu Buhari (m. 1989; died 2025)
- Children: 5
- Relatives: Muhammadu Ribadu (grandfather)
- Education: BA in public administration; MSc in international affairs; Diploma in beauty therapy; Postgraduate Diploma in Cosmetology and beauty
- Alma mater: Ambrose Alli University; Nigerian Defense Academy; Carlton Institute of Beauty and Therapy; Academy Esthetique Beauty Institute of France
- Occupation: Cosmetologist; beauty therapist; Aisha Buhari Foundation

Aisha Halilu Buhari (born 17 February 1971) is a beauty therapist who served as the First Lady of Nigeria from 2015 to 2023. She is also known for her advocacy and humanitarian work.

Buhari is a vocal advocate for women’s and children’s rights and has been involved in initiatives aimed at improving their welfare in Nigeria. In 2014, she founded the Aisha Buhari Foundation, a non-governmental organisation focused on humanitarian and philanthropic efforts, particularly concerning the well-being of women and children. The foundation’s flagship programme, Future Assured, promotes maternal and child health, education, nutrition, and economic empowerment through community outreach, free health services, and support for underserved populations.

Through Future Assured and other engagements, she has campaigned against gender-based violence, supported girl-child education, and collaborated with development partners to expand healthcare access and social welfare services. She has also used her platform to appeal for improved laws and policies that protect women and children from early marriage, abuse, and exploitation.

== Early life and family ==
Aisha Halilu was born on 17 February 1971, in Adamawa State, northeastern Nigeria. Her grandfather Alhaji Muhammadu Ribadu was Nigeria's first minister of defence. Aisha's father was a civil engineer, and her mother is a descendant of the Ankali family, renowned farmers. Aisha Buhari went to primary and secondary school in Adamawa State. On 2 December 1989, Aisha married Muhammadu Buhari, who had five children from a previous marriage to Safinatu Yusuf. Aisha and Muhammadu Buhari have five children together and one grandchild.

== Education ==
Aisha Buhari earned a bachelor's degree in public administration from Ambrose Alli University (AAU), and a master's degree in international affairs and strategic studies from the Nigerian Defence Academy, Kaduna. Buhari obtained a diploma in beauty therapy from the Carlton Institute of Beauty Therapy, Windsor, UK. Buhari holds a post-graduate diploma in cosmetology and beauty from Academy Esthetique Beauty Institute of France. Buhari is a member of the United Kingdom Vocational Training and Charitable Trust and the International Health and Beauty Council.

== Business career ==
For years, Buhari has run a business as the founder/managing director of Hanzy Spa and principal of Hanzy Beauty Institute, a beauty salon in Kaduna and Abuja. Buhari is a resource person to the National Board for Technical Education (NBTE), on beauty therapy and cosmetology and has participated in the curriculum development of small medium enterprises for NBTE. Buhari closed her beauty salon following the emergence of her husband as president of Nigeria.

Buhari published a book titled Essentials of Beauty Therapy: A Complete Guide for Beauty Specialists, which has been recommended as a text for the NBTE curriculum.

== Political career and advocacy ==
In July 2014, Buhari advised Goodluck Ebele Jonathan to resign from office as president of Nigeria, following a suicide bombing and an alleged assassination attempt on her husband by the Boko Haram terrorist group.

Buhari is a vocal advocate of women's rights and children's rights, and this was a focal point during her campaign for her husband's election in 2015. Aisha has, on several occasions, emphasized the need for young girls to get primary and secondary school education before getting married, saying that she believes no girl should get married before the age of 17. She has also criticized child marriage and homosexuality.

In May 2015, on the sidelines of the Global Women Conference held in Buenos Aires, Argentina, she stressed the need for Nigerian laws that will protect the women from forced early marriages, sex trafficking and other issues Nigerian girls and women contend with. Aisha raised concerns on child sexual abuse in Nigeria, sex trafficking and the need for legislation against early marriage.

On 12 June 2015, Buhari met with some mothers of the abducted Chibok Girls on 14 April 2016, and donated proceeds from her book to parents of the Chibok girls, the Buni Yadi boys murdered in 2014, and children suffering from malnutrition.

In October 2016, Buhari said that she would not back her husband in the next election unless he got a grip on his government. He responded that she belonged in his kitchen, saying "I don't know which party my wife belongs to, but she belongs to my kitchen and my living room and the other room."

In April 2021, she attended the book of "Aisha Buhari – Being Different", written by Hajo Sani, the Senior Special Adviser to the President on Women Affairs and Administration. The book has memories of the first lady from her childhood on. The launch was attended by vice president Yemi Osinbajo and other dignitaries.

== Future Assured ==
"Future Assured" is an initiative founded by Buhari to continue her advocacy work for the health and well-being of women and children through community mobilization and goodhealth promotion. Buhari was prompted by the need to improve the current poor health outcomes of women, children and other vulnerable groups of the Nigerian population. She affirmed her commitment to this work at a stakeholders meeting held at the presidential villa and a public launch of Future Assured programs at the sidelines of the United Nations General Assembly in New York on 29 September 2015.

Buhari works with internally displaced people resulting from the Boko Haram insurgency. She set up a committee for the distribution of relief materials after a visit to an IDP camp in Borno State.

== Aisha Buhari Cup ==
The Aisha Buhari Cup is an invitational football tournament organized by the Nigerian football federation for the women's national team.

== Public image ==
Aisha Buhari surprised Nigerians when she made it known that her role as the wife of the president of Nigeria will be limited to whatever is constitutionally recognized, and she promised not to overstep. At the presentation of awards to wives of governors, on Thursday, 13 June 2019, Aisha Buhari adopted the title of first lady five years after President Buhari said he would scrap the office.

== Controversies ==
In October 2019, Fatima Daura, the daughter of the newspaper editor Mamman Daura, accused Aisha of verbally abusing her and attacking her family. Fatima recorded a video of Aisha ranting inside the presidential villa in Abuja and submitted the video to the press. Fatima Daura said she recorded the video because no one would have believed her if she made those claims without evidence. Aisha Buhari confirmed she was the one in the video and alleged that Fatima Daura had mocked her while recording her. Aisha later apologized in a statement through her spokesman. She explained that she was angry because Mamman Daura and his family denied her access to some parts of the presidential villa after President Buhari ordered Mamman Daura and his family out of the villa.

In the early months of 2022, Nigerian university student Aminu Adamu Mohammed posted on the social media platform Twitter, mentioning Aisha in a tweet in what can be interpreted as a defamatory manner. There were mixed reports from media outlets reporting that Aminu had commented under a photo that Aisha was simply fat in appearance. But roughly translated into English from a court transcription of the Hausa phrase Aminu tweeted, "Mama is feeding fat on poor people's money.", implying that Aisha has been embezzling government funds. Aminu was formally charged and arrested 5 months later in mid-November 2022. The charges included cybercrime, cybersquatting, computer-related forgery, conspiracy, and criminal breach of trust. This has led to many activist groups, Amnesty International, the National Association of Nigerian students, and citizens calling out the Nigerian government to release Aminu due to the violation of human rights regarding free speech and the reported torture Aminu endured during his time in captivity. After national and international backlash regarding the incident, on 2 December 2022 all charges were dropped after the withdrawal of the initial complaint from Aisha.

== See also ==
- List of Hausa people
- Aisha Buhari Foundation
