= Patience Jonathan =

First Lady of Nigeria (2010–2015)

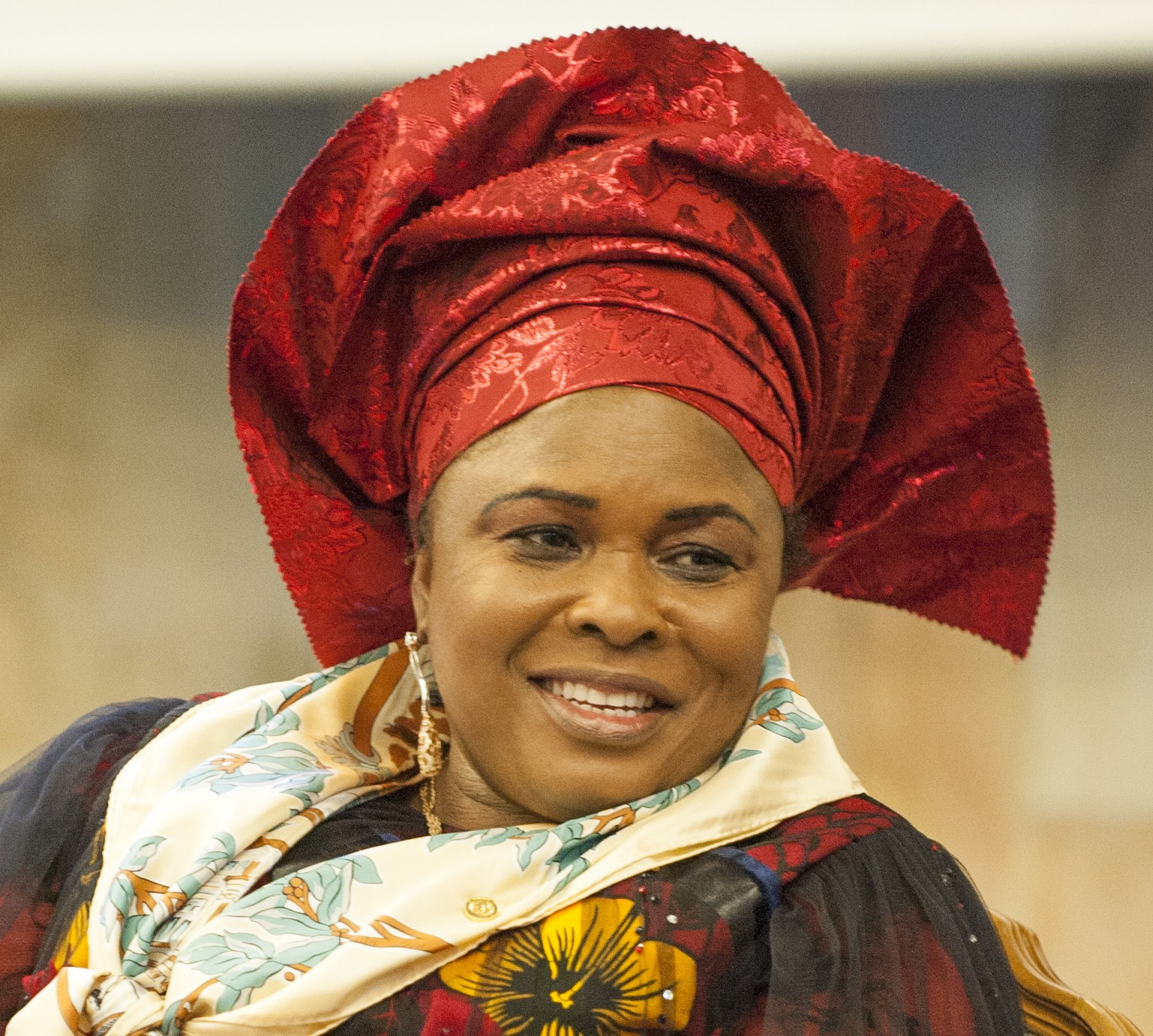

First Lady of Nigeria
- In role 6 May 2010 – 29 May 2015
- President: Goodluck Jonathan
- Preceded by: Turai Yar'Adua
- Succeeded by: Aisha Buhari

Second Lady of Nigeria
- In role 29 May 2007 – 6 May 2010
- Vice President: Goodluck Jonathan
- First Lady: Turai Yar'Adua
- Preceded by: Amina Atiku-Abubakar
- Succeeded by: Amina Sambo

Personal details
- Born: Patience Faka Iwari; 25 October 1957 (age 68) Port Harcourt, Eastern Region, British Nigeria (now in Rivers State, Nigeria)
- Spouse: Goodluck Jonathan
- Children: 2
- Education: University of Port Harcourt

Patience Faka Jonathan (née Iwari; born 25 October 1957) is a Nigerian civil servant who served as the First Lady of Nigeria from 2010 to 2015 and second lady of Nigeria from 2007 to 2010. She is married to the former President and Vice President of Nigeria Goodluck Ebele Jonathan. She served as a Permanent Secretary in Bayelsa State.

== Education ==
Patience Faka Iwari was born in Port Harcourt, Rivers State, Nigeria, where she earned her school certificate in 1976, and passed the West African School Certificate Examination (WASCE) in 1980. In 1989, she obtained the National Certificate of Education (NCE) in Mathematics and Biology from the Rivers State College of Arts and Science, Port Harcourt. She then proceeded to the University of Port Harcourt and studied for a BEd in Biology and Psychology. She was awarded an honorary doctorate from the University of Port Harcourt.

== Career ==
Patience started her career as a teacher at the Stella Maris College, Port Harcourt and at the Sports Institute, Isaka. She then moved to the banking sector in 1997 where she served as the marketing manager of Imiete Community Bank. After which she established the first community bank in Port Harcourt called the Akpo Community Bank. She then returned to the classroom briefly again as a teacher. Eventually she was transferred to the Bayelsa State Ministry of Education, where she served until 29 May 1999, when her husband became the deputy governor of the state. On 12 July 2012, she was appointed as permanent secretary in Bayelsa state by Henry Seriake Dickson. The appointment was unique considering she had been on leave from the civil service for over 13 years, since her husband became deputy governor in 1999, and some critics argued it was a national embarrassment highlighting there was no merit or evidence of any recent performance to warrant a promotion to the peak of the civil service. It is alleged that Henry Seriake Dickson was sponsored to his governorship position by her husband.

She and her husband have two children.

== Philanthropic work ==
Patience has been recognized locally, nationally, and internationally for her philanthropic work and political pragmatism. She received the "Beyond The Tears" International Humanitarian Award New York, USA, in 2008, for her role in the global fight against HIV/AIDS; the African Goodwill Ambassador Award (Los Angeles, USA, 2008) and was the recipient of the "Wind of Change" Award from the South/South Women's Organization.

When Goodluck Jonathan served as a Governor between 2005 and 2007, Patience Jonathan served the state in the capacity of the First Lady of Bayelsa State, Nigeria. During this period, she founded many philanthropic and women empowerment programs, among them are the A-Aruere Reachout Foundation (AARF), which she set up to improve the status and earning capacity of Nigerian women and youths. The foundation already has its focus on supporting and assisting children with heart-related problems.

== Other ==
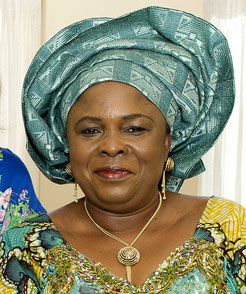
Jonathan in 2012.

It was announced 4 September 2012 that she was hospitalized in Germany following a severe bout of food poisoning that lasted for days. Patience Jonathan felt sick about 10 days earlier, following her hosting of a summit of first ladies from across Africa. Patience was discharged from the Horst Schmidt Klinik in Wiesbaden on 2 October 2012.

When the national media noticed her unusual disappearance from public view, the approach of her office was to initially deflect attention by denying she was in Germany to utilize the high-quality healthcare provision of the country. Her spokesman, Ayo Osinlu, released a statement stating that she had only gone to Germany "to take time off to rest" and not for medical purposes. This was to avoid highlighting the presidential family were avoiding using the low-quality healthcare system provided for the Nigerian citizens and prefer higher quality foreign provisions for themselves at taxpayers expense when needed.

Patience Jonathan broke down in tears on hearing the latest news on the abduction of the girls of the Government Girls Secondary School in Chibok. She was involved in controversy during the crisis over 230 Chibok girls abducted by Boko Haram in north-east Nigeria.

== See also ==
- List of people from Port Harcourt

Honorary titles
Preceded by Turai Yar'Adua	First Lady of Nigeria	Succeeded by Aisha Buhari
