= Itunu Hotonu =

Nigerian naval officer and architect (born 1959)

- Born: Itunu Tomori; January 18, 1959 (age 67); Nigeria
- Citizenship: Nigerian
- Education: University of Nigeria (Architecture); Nigerian Defence Academy, Abuja (Officer training)
- Occupations: Naval officer, Architect
- Known for: First female admiral in Africa; First woman to attend the Nigerian Defence Academy
- Spouse: Abayomi Hotonu
- Children: 3
- Awards: Commander-in-Chief's Prize (Best overall student, NDA); Commandant's Prize (Best research project, NDA)

Rear Admiral Itunu Hotonu (born 18 January 1959) is a Nigerian naval officer and architect. One of the first women officers and amongst the first architects in the Nigerian Navy, she has served as a staff college instructor and abroad in Liberia. In December 2012 she became the first female admiral in Africa.

== Career ==
Itunu Hotonu was born (as Itunu Tomori) on 18 January 1959. By the age of 13 she decided that she wanted to become an architect. Hotonu studied architecture at the University of Nigeria, where she was often the only woman in her classes. After graduating she worked in an architect's office for two years whilst she took her professional examinations.

Hotonu applied to join the Engineering Corps of the Nigerian Army but was told there were no positions for women in that field. She then applied to the Navy, which did not have gender restrictions. She was accepted as an officer candidate at the National Defence Academy, Abuja, in 1985. She was the first woman to attend the academy and graduated as best overall student in her class of 73. She won the Commander-in-Chief's Prize and also the Commandant's Prize for best research project. Hotonu became one of the first architects to join the Nigerian Navy.

Hotonu was the first female officer to serve as an instructor at the Armed Forces Command and Staff College in Jaji. In 2012 she spent time in Liberia mentoring women in that country's armed forces. She was promoted to the rank of rear admiral in December 2012, becoming the first female admiral in Africa.

== Personal life ==
Hotonu is married to architect Abayomi Hotonu with whom she has three children.
