= Lekki–Epe Expressway =

Expressway connecting the Lekki and Epe districts in Lagos State

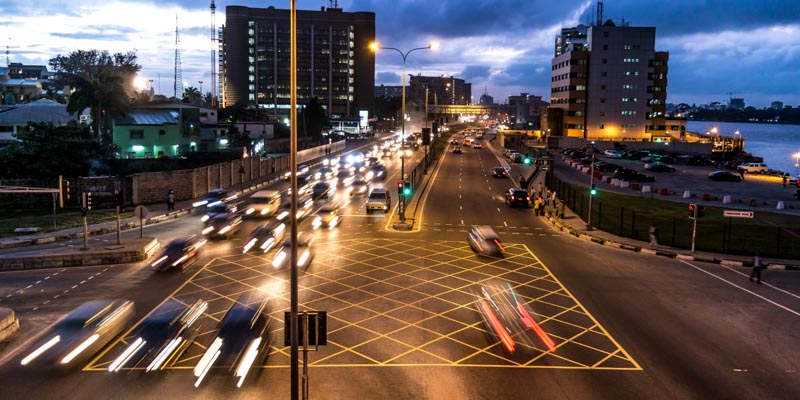

Route information
- Length: 49.5 km (30.8 mi)
- History: Completed 2011

Major junctions
- West end: Lekki
- East end: Epe

Location
- Country: Nigeria
- States: Lagos
- Major cities: Lagos, Lekki, Epe

Highway system
- Transport in Nigeria

The Lekki–Epe Expressway is a 49.5-kilometre (30.8 mi) expressway connecting the Lekki and Epe districts in Lagos State. The Lekki-Epe expressway was first built in the 1980s. It was built during the Lateef Jakande's administration. It is the second private toll project in Africa. The road construction project was financed by the African Development Bank. The bank provided a loan of up to US$85 million to help fund the upgrade and rehabilitation of the Lekki to Epe expressway in 2008, and it was based on Public-Private Partnership (PPP) under the Design, Build, Operate (DBOT), and Transfer and Rehabilitate, Operate (ROT) framework/business model.

The Lekki Concession Company manages the toll road.
