= Murtala Muhammed =

Military head of state of Nigeria from 1975 to 1976

General Murtala Muhammed GCFR
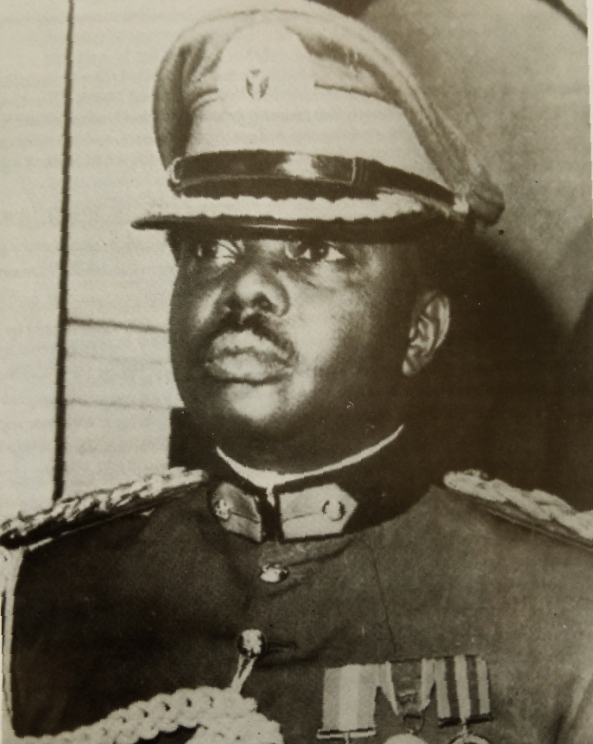

4th Head of State of Nigeria
- In office 29 July 1975 – 13 February 1976
- Chief of Staff: Olusegun Obasanjo
- Preceded by: Yakubu Gowon
- Succeeded by: Olusegun Obasanjo

Personal details
- Born: 8 November 1938 Kano, Northern Region, British Nigeria (now Kano, Kano State, Nigeria)
- Died: 13 February 1976 (aged 37) Lagos, Nigeria
- Cause of death: Assassination
- Party: (none) military
- Spouse: Ajoke Muhammed (m. 1963)
- Relations: Ireti Kingibe (sister-in-law)
- Children: 6, including Aisha
- Education: Barewa College; Royal Military Academy, Sandhurst
- Occupation: Military officer
- Nickname: "Monty of the Midwest"

Military service
- Allegiance: Nigeria
- Branch/service: Nigerian Army
- Years of service: 1958–1976
- Rank: General
- Battles/wars: Congo Crisis; Nigerian Civil War; Midwest Invasion of 1967; First Battle of Onitsha; Second Battle of Onitsha; Abagana Ambush

Murtala Ramat Muhammed GCFR (Hausa pronunciation; 8 November 1938 – 13 February 1976) was a Nigerian military officer and the fourth head of state of Nigeria. He led the 1966 Nigerian counter-coup in overthrowing the military regime of Johnson Aguiyi-Ironsi and featured prominently during the Nigerian Civil War and thereafter ruled Nigeria from 29 July 1975 until his assassination on 13 February 1976. This period in Nigerian history, from the Northern counter-coup victory to Murtala's death, is commonly associated with the institutionalization of the military in Nigerian politics.

Born in Kano to Gyanawa father, Mohammed Riskuwa and Kanuri Jobawa mother Uwani Ramatu from Kano state. Murtala served in the Nigerian Army as a cadet in the Royal Military Academy, Sandhurst. He later served in Congo; eventually rose through the ranks to become brigadier general in 1971, aged 33, becoming one of the youngest generals in Nigeria. Three years later, Murtala became the Federal Commissioner for Communications in Lagos. As a conservative and federalist, Murtala regretted the overthrow of the First Republic and the promulgation of Aguiyi Ironsi's unification decree of 1966. He was devastated by the assassination of Sir Ahmadu Bello, and for a time seriously considered the secession of Northern Nigeria. His career redoubled after Chukwuma Kaduna Nzeogwu and the young majors orchestrated the first military coup in Nigeria of 1966 empowering him to lead the mutiny of the night of 29 July 1966 in Abeokuta. Murtala was briefly considered as Supreme Commander before the appointment of Yakubu Gowon.

During the war, he commanded Nigeria's Second Infantry Division which committed the Asaba massacre and was responsible for the death of civilians and many of the rebels. Three years later the Federal military government declared victory which bolstered Murtala's image over Nigeria and in particular the north as a military leader through the post-war era of "reconciliation, reconstruction, and rehabilitation". In post-civil-war Nigeria, Murtala ruled with more power than any Nigerian leader before or since and developed a charismatic authority and cult of personality. During the Cold War he maintained Nigerian neutrality through participation in the non-aligned movement but supported the Soviet Union — during his effort in the Angolan Civil War. This support is better understood within the context of the liberation of African countries from colonialism than as support for the Soviet Union.

At the same time, his regime transitioned from being authoritarian into consensus decision-making with Murtala the leader of a military triumvirate, alongside Generals Olusegun Obasanjo and Theophilus Danjuma. The dictatorship softened and Murtala unveiled plans for the demilitarization of politics. In 1976, barely seven months into his nascent rule Murtala without having time to see his plans implemented was assassinated in a failed coup d'état, being succeeded by Olusegun Obasanjo as Head of State, who, in turn, led the Nigerian transition to democracy with the Second Nigerian Republic.

The legacy of Murtala in Nigerian history remains controversial as the nature of his rule changed over time. His reign was marked by both brutal repression, and economic prosperity, which greatly improved the quality of life in Nigeria. His dictatorial style proved highly adaptable, which enabled wide-ranging social and economic reform, while consistent pursuits during his reign centered on highly centralised government, authoritarianism, federalism, national Federalism, and pan-Africanism.

== Early life ==
Murtala's father, Muhammed Risqua, was from Kano state and has a family history of knowledge in Islamic jurisprudence, Murtala's paternal grandfather Suleman, paternal great-grandfather Muhammad Zangi and paternal great-great grandfather Salihu Dattuwa from the family of Muhammad Gyano of the Fulani Genawa Clan served as Chief judges in Kano. Muhammad Risqua, worked as a veterinary officer in the Kano Native Authority and was related to Aminu Kano, Inuwa Wada, and Aminu Wali. He died in 1953.

His mother, Uwani Rahamatu, was from the Kanuri and Fulani Jobawa clan, the Jobawa clan members include the Makama of Kano and Abdullahi Aliyu Sumaila, his maternal grandfather Yakubu Soja a World War I veteran was from Dawakin Tofa while his maternal grandmother Hajiya Hauwau (Aya) was from Gezawa, Murtala was educated at Cikin Gida Elementary School which was inside the emir's palace.

He then transferred to Gidan Makama primary school in Kano which was just outside the palace. He then proceeded to Kano Middle School (now Rumfa College, Kano) in 1949, before attending the famous Government College (now Barewa College) in Zaria, where he obtained his school certificate in 1957. At Barewa College, Muhammed was a member of the Cadet Corps and was captain of shooting in his final year. In 1957, he obtained a school leaving certificate and applied to join the Nigerian army later in the year.

== Early career ==
Murtala Muhammed joined the Nigerian Army in 1958. He spent short training stints in Nigeria and Ghana and then was trained as an officer cadet at Sandhurst Royal Military Academy in England. After his training, he was commissioned as a second lieutenant in 1961 and assigned to the Nigerian Army Signals that same year, later spending a short stint with the No. 3 Brigade Signals Troop in Congo. In 1962, Muhammed was appointed aide-de-camp to M. A. Majekodunmi, the federally-appointed administrator of the Western Region.

In 1963, he became the officer-in-charge of the First Brigade Signal Troop in Kaduna, Nigeria. That year he traveled to the Royal Corps of Signals at Catterick Garrison, England for a course on advanced telecommunications techniques. On his return to Nigeria in 1964, he was promoted to major and appointed officer-commanding, 1st Signal Squadron in Apapa, Lagos. In November 1965, he was made acting Chief of Signals of the Army, while his paternal uncle, Inuwa Wada had recently been appointed Defense Minister.

Unknown to Muhammed, majors planning the January 1966 coup recruited troops from the signal unit. The coup plotters later went on to assassinate leading politicians and soldiers from the Northern and Western region. After the coup plot failed, new military postings made by the new leader generated some discomfort in the North. In April 1966, Muhammed was promoted to Lieutenant Colonel and was the inspector of signals posted to Army Headquarters, Lagos in a move that was partly to pacify Northerners weary about the new military regime. Muhammed was also appointed member of a Post and Telecommunications management committee. Muhammed opposed the regime of Johnson Aguiyi-Ironsi, which took power after a coup d'etat on 15 January 1966.

Aguiyi-Ironsi, as GOC of the Nigerian Army, brought normalcy back to the nation by imprisoning the coup makers and intimidating the federal cabinet into handing over the helms of government to him. However, many northerners saw this and the reluctance of Ironsi to prosecute the coup leaders, and the fact that the army was purportedly giving exceptional privileges to the coupist as an indication of Ironsi's support for the killings. Consequently, northern politicians and civil servants mounted pressure upon northern officers such as Muhammed to avenge the coup. The promulgation of Decree No. 34 restructuring Nigeria from a federal constitutional structure to a unitary structure also raised suspicions among many Northern officers and Muhammed and a few others began to contemplate separation of the Northern region from the country.

== 1966 counter-coup ==
On the night of 29 July 1966, northern soldiers at Abeokuta barracks mutinied, thus precipitating a counter-coup, which may very well have been in the planning stages. A group among the officers supported secession and thus gave the code name of the coup 'A raba' meaning secession in Hausa. However, after the success of the counter-coup, a group of civilians including the Chief Justice Adetokunbo Ademola, Sule Katagum, head of the Federal Public service and Musa Daggash, Permanent Secretary, defense convinced the plotters including Muhammed about the advantages of a union.

The counter-coup led to the installation of Lieutenant-Colonel Yakubu Gowon as Supreme Commander of the Nigerian Armed Forces, despite the intransigence of Muhammed who wanted the role of Supreme Commander for himself. However, as Gowon was militarily his senior, and finding a lack of support from the British and American advisors, he caved in. Gowon rewarded him by confirming his ranking (he had been an acting Lt. Colonel until then) and his appointment (Inspector of Signals). The acceptance of Gowon as the Head of State was not supported by all the key military leaders, in particular, Odumegwu Ojukwu, military governor of the Eastern Region.

== Civil war ==
At the start of the Nigerian Civil War, Muhammed was the commander of the newly established Second Infantry Division. The 2 Division was responsible for the beating back of the Biafran Army from the Mid-West region, as well as crossing the River Niger and linking up with the 1 Division, which was advancing from Nsukka and Enugu. However, this was only achieved after several failed river crossings in which thousands of troops died as a result of drowning or enemy fire. During his time as commander, Muhammed was implicated in several violations of appropriate conduct; Lieutenant Ishola Williams, an officer who served under Muhammed alleged that he ordered the summary execution of Biafran prisoners of war.

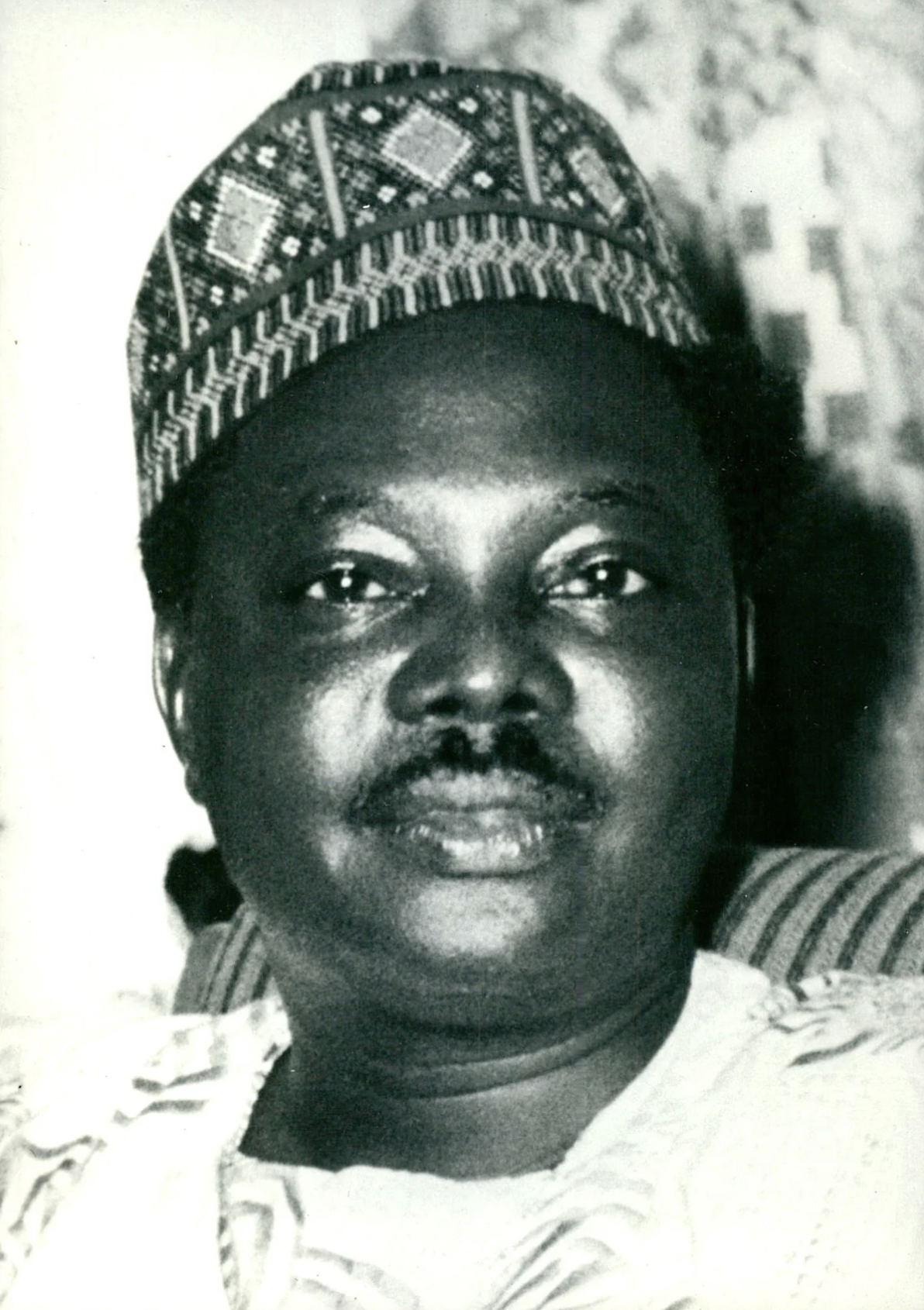
Muhammed in civilian clothes, 1975

In June 1968, he relinquished his commanding position and was posted to Lagos and appointed Inspector of Signals. In April 1968, he was promoted to colonel.

On October 5–7, 1967, the Second Division under the command of Murtala perpetrated the Asaba massacre, targeting the city of Asaba which was mostly composed of Igbo people.

The actions of the division during this period, mostly in Asaba became a subject of speculation. In a book published in 2017, S. Elizabeth Bird and Fraser Ottanelli document the 1967 mass murder of civilians by troops of the 2 Division under General Muhammed's command. They also discuss the events leading up to the massacre, and its impact on Asaba and on the progress of the war, as well as other civilian massacres carried out by soldiers of the 2nd Division at Onitsha and Isheagu.

== Military service ==
Between 1970 and 1971, he attended the Joint Service Staff College in England, his supervisor's report attributed him to having ''a quick agile mind, considerable ability and common sense. He holds strong views which he puts forward in a forthright manner. He is a strong character and determined. However, he finds it difficult to moderate his opinions and finds it difficult to enter into debate with others whose views he may not share''. After the war, he was promoted to brigadier-general in October 1971. Between 1971 and 1974, Muhammed was involved in routine activities within the signals unit of the army. However, he also disagreed with some of the policies being pursued by Gowon.

On 7 August 1974, the head of state, General Yakubu Gowon appointed him as the new Federal Commissioner for Communications, which he combined with his military duties as Inspector of Signals at the Army Signals Headquarters in Apapa, Lagos. On 7 August 1974, General Yakubu Gowon appointed Muhammed as the Federal commissioner (position now called Minister) for communications to oversee and facilitate the nation's development of cost effective communication infrastructures during the oil boom. After the war and after he took power as head of state, Muhammed started the reorganization and demobilization of 100,000 troops from the armed forces. The number of troops in the armed forces decreased from 250,000 to 150,000.

== In government ==
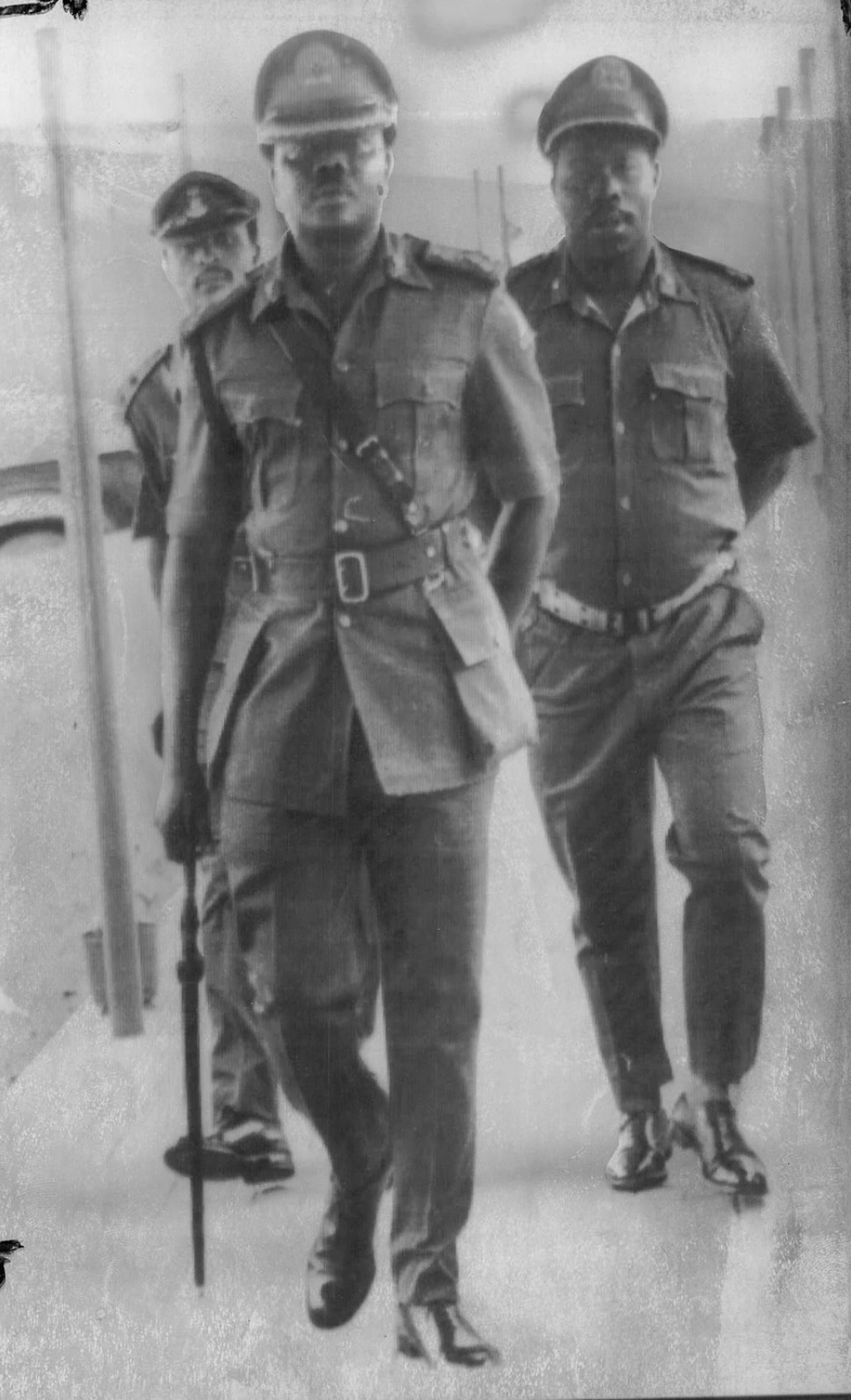
Muhammed with his Chief of Staff Lt. Gen. Olusegun Obasanjo (right)

On 29 July 1975, General Yakubu Gowon was overthrown while attending the 12th summit of the Organisation of African Unity (OAU) in Kampala, Uganda. Muhammed took power as the new military Head of State. Brigadiers Obasanjo and Danjuma (both later Lt. Generals) were appointed as Chief of Staff of the Supreme Military HQ and Chief of Army Staff, respectively.

=== Charisma ===
In the coup d'état that brought him to power he introduced the phrases "Fellow Nigerians" and "with immediate effect" to the national lexicon. In a short time, Murtala Muhammed's policies won him broad popular support, and his decisiveness elevated him to the status of a folk hero.

However his highly popular, often televised "with immediate effect" style of governing, also gained some criticism amongst the countries top civil servants - some of which were Nigeria’s top intellectuals. His ad-hoc Presidential proclamations left his civil service often unprepared, lacking details or even funding to implement his ideas, and his administration led to the dismissal of thousands of civil servants. Over 10,000 civil servants, government employees were dismissed without benefits; reasons stated were age, health, incompetence, or malpractice. The removal of such a large number of public officials affected the public service, the judiciary, the police and armed forces, the diplomatic service, public corporations, and university officials. Quite a few officials were tried on corruption charges, and an ex-military state governor was executed for gross office misconduct.

=== National federalism ===
Muhammed took federal control of the country's two largest newspapers – Daily Times and New Nigerian; all media in Nigeria was now under federal control. He also took federal control of the remaining state-run universities. On February 3, 1976, the Military Government of Murtala Muhammed created new states and renamed others, the states he created include: Bauchi, Benue, Borno, Imo, Niger, Ogun, and Ondo. This brought the total number of states in Nigeria to nineteen in 1976.

As head of state, Muhammed put in place plans to build a new Federal Capital Territory due to Lagos being overcrowded. He set up a panel headed by Justice Akinola Aguda, which chose the Abuja area as the new capital ahead of other proposed locations. On 3 February 1976, Muhammed announced that the federal capital would in the future move to a federal territory location of about 8,000 square kilometres in the central part of the country.

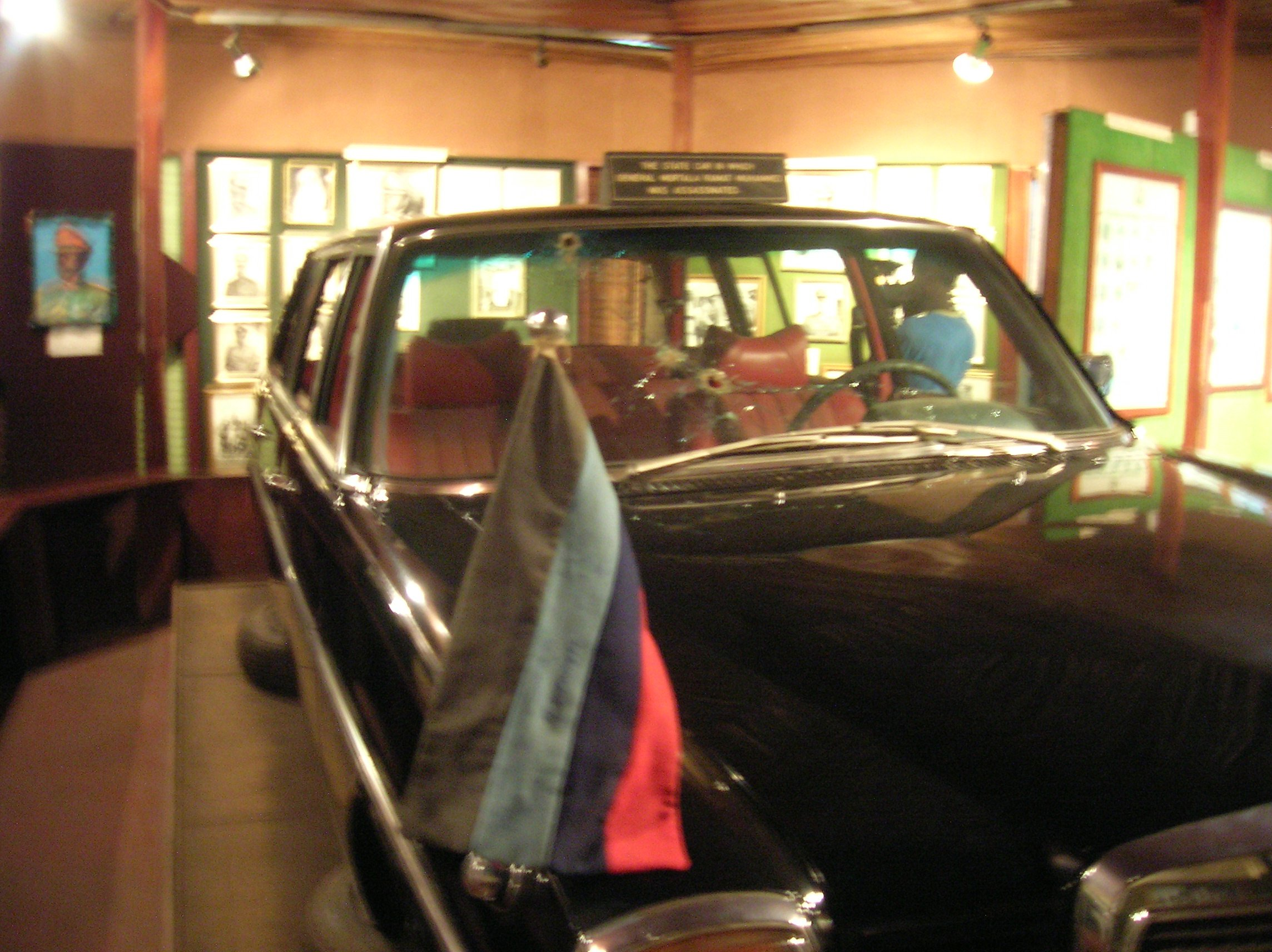
Car in which Murtala Muhammed was assassinated

Towards the end of 1975, the administration implemented a mass purge in the Nigerian civil service. The civil service was viewed as undisciplined and lacking a sense of purpose. A retrenchment exercise was implemented as part of a strategy to refocus the service. However, because of the drastic nature of the purge, allegations that malice and revenge was used by heads of department in recommending people for retrenchment surfaced, and little was done to scrutinize the details and reasons staff were disengaged.

=== Economic policy ===
As head of state Murtala Muhammed inherited an immense amount of oil and petroleum resources and enormous but untapped natural gas reserves. But in 1975, Muhammed saw reduced revenue due to low levels of petroleum production; this meant that the military government lacked the projected funds to meet Nigeria's development plan for 1975. The decline in petroleum production in 1975 was due to a global fall in demand, high costs of spare parts and high labour costs.

== Assassination ==
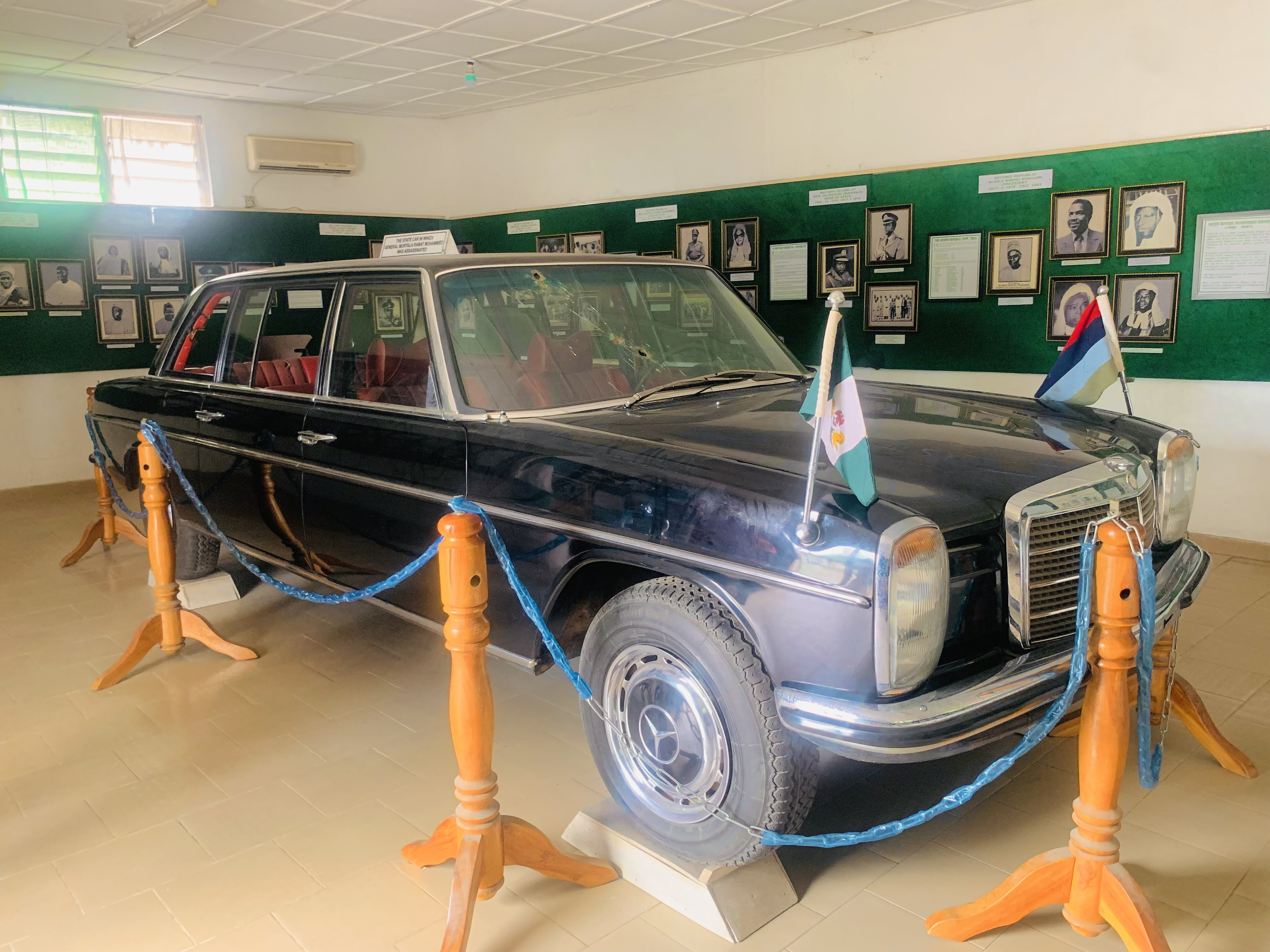
State car in which General Murtala Mohammed was assassinated

On 13 February 1976, General Muhammed set off for work along his usual route on George Street. Shortly after 8 a.m., his Mercedes-Benz car travelled slowly in the infamous Lagos traffic near the Federal Secretariat at Ikoyi in Lagos and a group of soldiers, members of an abortive coup led by Lt. Col. Bukar Suka Dimka, emerged from an adjacent petrol station, ambushed the vehicle and assassinated Muhammed.

Muhammed was assassinated, aged 37, along with his aide-de-camp, Lieutenant Akintunde Akinsehinwa, and his driver, Sergeant Adamu Michika, in his black Mercedes on 13 February 1976. The only visible sign of protection was a pistol carried by his orderly, making his assassination an easy task. The assassination was part of an attempted coup led by Dimka, who was later tried and executed on 15 May 1976 for treason.

== Legacy ==
Today, Muhammed's portrait adorns the 20 Naira note and Murtala Muhammed International Airport in Lagos is named in his honour.

== Marriage ==
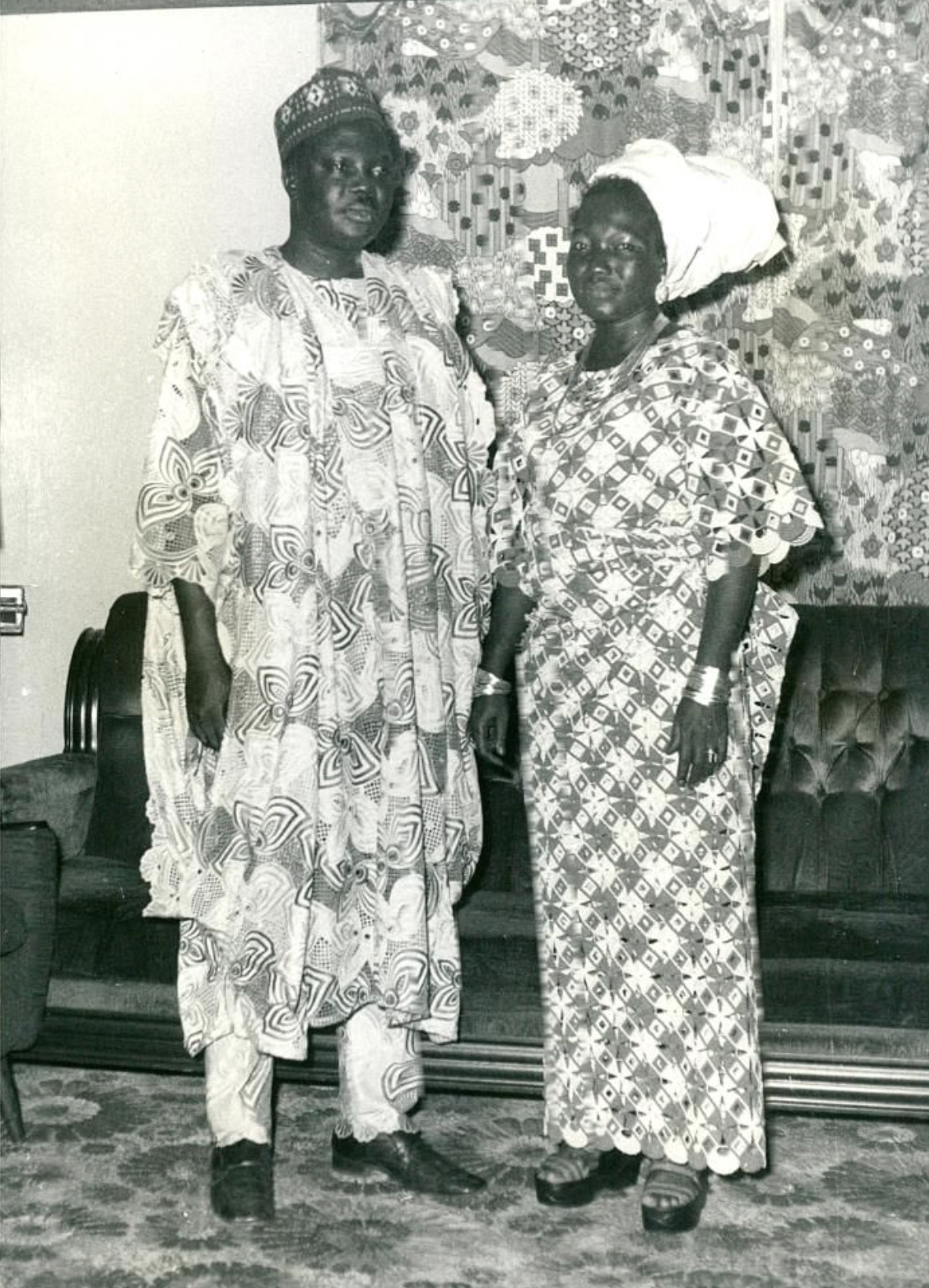
Muhammed with his wife Ajoke

Murtala Muhammed was married to Ajoke. They had six children together. They are Aisha, Zakari (deceased), Fatima, Abba (also known as Risqua), Zeliha and Jummai. Abba Muhammed was a Special Adviser to President Olusegun Obasanjo on privatisation.

== Medals ==
Murtala Muhammed had received several awards and medals. In alphabetical order they included:

- Forces Service Star (FSS)
- General Service Medal (GSM)
- Meritorious Service Star (MSS)
- National Service Medal (NSM)
- Republic Medal (RM)

== See also ==
- List of heads of state and government who were assassinated or executed
- History of Nigeria#Dictatorship and War (1966-1979)

Military offices
Preceded by Yakubu Gowon	Head of the Federal Military Government of Nigeria; 29 July 1975 – 13 February 1976	Succeeded by Olusegun Obasanjo
