= 1961 Northern Region legislative election =

Legislative elections were held in the Northern Region of Nigeria in May 1961.

== Results ==
Party	Seats
Northern People's Congress	156
Action Group–UMBC	9
NCNC–NEPU	1
Total	166
Source: Sternberger et al.

== See also ==
- 1960 Western Region legislative election
- 1961 Eastern Region legislative election
- 1964 Mid-West Region legislative election
