= Eastern Region, Nigeria =

Administrative region in Nigeria

Eastern Region
- Autonomous region of Nigeria
- 1954–1967
- Capital: Enugu
- Demonym: Easterner
- Area
  - 1965: 76,145.65 km^{2} (29,400.00 sq mi)
- Population
  - 1965: 12,000,000
- Government: Eastern Nigerian Government
  - Type: Parliamentary constitutional monarchy (1954–1963); Parliamentary republic (1963–1966); Military dictatorship (1966–1967)
- Governor
  - 1954–1956: Clement John Pleass
  - 1956–1960: Robert Stapledon
  - 1960–1966: Francis Akanu Ibiam
  - 1966–1967: Chukwuemeka Odumegwu-Ojukwu
- Premier
  - 1951–1953: Eyo Ita
  - 1954–1959: Nnamdi Azikiwe
  - 1959–1966: Michael Okpara
- Legislature: Eastern Regional Assembly
  - Upper house: House of Chiefs
  - Lower house: House of Assembly
- Historical era: Decolonisation of Africa
  - British colonization: 1884
  - Established: 1 October 1954
  - Elections: 15 March 1957
  - End of British rule: 1 October 1960
  - Elections: 16 November 1961
  - Constitution of the First Republic: 1 October 1963
  - Coup d'état: 15 January 1966
  - Counter-coup: 28 July 1966
  - Anti-Igbo pogrom: May–October 1966
  - Aburi Accord: 5 January 1967
  - Independence (as Biafra): 27 May 1967
  - Dissolution of Biafra: 15 January 1970
Preceded by	Succeeded by
Colonial Nigeria	Biafra
- Today part of: Nigeria

The Eastern Region was an administrative region in Nigeria, dating back originally from the division of the colony Southern Nigeria in 1954. Its first capital was Enugu. The capital was later moved to Umuahia during the Nigerian Civil War but returned to Enugu after Biafra was defeated. The region was officially divided in 1967 into three new states, the East-Central State, Rivers State and South-Eastern State. East-Central State had its capital at Enugu, which is now part of Enugu State.

The region had the country's third-, fourth- and fifth-largest indigenous ethnic groups including Igbo, Ibibio and Ijaw, respectively. It was what later became Biafra, which was in rebellion from 1967 to 1970.

== Geography ==
The Eastern region of Nigeria was geographically located in Southeastern Nigeria. It is bordered by the Niger river in the West and has an administrative and cultural border with the Northern region of Nigeria to the north. The eastern boundary lies between the border of Nigeria and Cameroon and the southern coast is along the Gulf of Guinea. The total surface area of the region was approximately 76,000 square kilometres (29,400 sq mi). In 1965, the region had a population of twelve million people and some areas such as Owerri and those inhabited by the Annangs were one of the most densely populated places in West Africa. The Awka region also suffered from soil erosion.

The region had three types of vegetation. The coastal area in the south is dominated by mangrove swamps and tidal waterways. Further north of the swamps is the tropical rainforest, however, over a period of time, many of the leafy trees of the forest were cleared for planting palm trees. In the northernmost parts of the region is the guinea savannah. Major rivers of the region include rivers of Niger Delta system such as Qua Iboe, Cross River, Orashi River and Imo River. Obudu Plateau in the northeastern area, the Oban and Ikom Hills along the eastern boundary with Cameroon were a few of the highlands in the region.

== History ==
=== Colonial rule ===
In 1849, John Beecroft, the governor of Fernando Po became the British consul agent for the Bights of Benin and Biafra. Beecroft was chosen to be in charge of regulating the trade at the ports of old and New Calabar and those at Benin, Bonny, Bimbia and the Cameroons between the residents and British merchant firms. The increase in trade within the ports led to the drive of several European firms to build trading post at Onitsha. In 1879, most of the firms merged to form the United African Company and were given a charter to manage a coastal protectorate in 1885. In 1884, the headquarters of the British agent for the Bights of Benin and Biafra was moved from Fernando Po to Calabar and in 1890, the Oil Rivers Protectorate, later known as the Niger Coast Protectorate was established. The Southern Nigeria Protectorate was formed in 1932 and by 1914 British colonial rule had established most of the administrative divisions in the Southern Nigeria Protectorate. In 1939, the Southern Province was divided into the Western and Eastern Province. During the war period, the provinces were given more power due to shortage of personnel.

Historically, residents of Eastern Nigeria had an individualistic and democratic culture. To establish indirect rule within the administrative divisions, the British began a tendency to strengthen the powers of the traditional village heads beyond their traditional pre-colonial duties.

Along with the British traders, Christian missionaries also established mission bases in the region. In 1846, Reverend Hope Masterton Waddell formed a branch of the Church of Scotland Mission. Ajayi Crowther of CMS established a Niger division at Onitsha, and soon followed by the Catholic Church. These missions found some converts among the residents including Rev James Boyle of Bonny, a priest at St. James Cathedral.

== Culture ==
Prior to World War II, there were five major cities in Eastern Nigeria: Port Harcourt and Enugu created after World War I, Calabar, Uyo, Ikot Ekpene, Onitsha, and Aba. Majority of the people lived in small communities and towns. The rise in trade contributed to the migration of men to towns and cities to find work and to trade but during Christmas and other festival periods, they usually come home. The men also built their family houses in their native villages.

Traditional authority in many villages is earned by the most senior man of the family next in line to the throne or a wealthy man who has paid footing to other title holders. Among the Efiks and Ibibio's, masked secret societies played an important social and regulatory role. The masked societies kept debtors in check and played important part in local festivals. In many areas in the region, the use of native courts to settle debts and bride price were important social institutions.

Dancing and sports were also important social elements in the Eastern region. Football was played between April and November. Sports was regulated by the regional branch of the Nigeria Football Association and those of the athletics association. Emmanuel Ifeajuna, was a gold member in High Jump at the Empire Games in Vancouver in 1954.

== Demographics ==
The Eastern region had an ethnically diverse population. The largest ethnic group in the region were the Igbos. The traditional society of the Igbos was democratic and individualistic with titles, wealth and age being the primary determinants of prestige. During colonial rule, the Igbos spread to other regions of British West Africa, first working as traders and laborers and then establishing small scale businesses in Lagos and other urban districts. The Ibibios and Efiks lived in the districts of Uyo, Opobo, Calabar, Enyong, Eket, Creek Town, Duke Town, Old Town and Ikot Ekpene. During pre-colonial and colonial rule, the Efiks controlled trading post up the Cross River to the Ports of Calabar. The other ethnic groups of the Niger Delta system include the Ijaw speaking people of Opobo, Bonny, Degema, Okrika, Buguma, Brass and Abonnema. The Ijaws had a marked chieftaincy tradition. Other groups within the region were the Annang of Ikot Ekpene, Yakurr, Bahumono, Oron, Ogoni and Ekoi.

== Economy ==
Trade in palm produce was a dominant feature in the economy of Eastern Nigeria. Though not indigenous to the region, the palm tree provided fronds for roofing of houses in the villages, palm wine for drinking and palm kernels as source of foreign exchange income. After World War II, prices sought for palm produce skyrocketed and by 1954, Palm produce generated an income of 54 million pounds. However, the prices stabilized by the middle of the 1950s. Employment in farming and agriculture was a significant source of income for many residents engaged in yam farming and fishery. In the 1960s, the government promoted rubber, cocoa and palm grove schemes to increase the output of cash crops. The government also established farm settlements at Ohaji, Igbariam, Boki, Ulonna, Erei, Uzo-Uwani and Egbema to encourage agriculture.

Trading of goods was also a major part of the regional economy. In 1954, imports to the region was about 25 million pounds a year which were brought into the country by a few European firms but distributed by thousands of traders within the region. The trade in imported goods such as dried fish, motor parts, textiles goes on along with the trade in local foodstuff.

In industry, the coal mines of Enugu managed by the Nigerian Coal Corporation and Nigersteel's rolling mill which used steel scraps to produce mild steel bars were one of the few coal mines and steel plants in operation in West Africa in 1963. During the NCNC led government, a cement factory was established at Nkalagu, Nigerian Breweries chose a stout factory at Aba, a Tobacco and glass making plant was located at Port Harcourt. Oil mining in the region started by Shell D' Archy in 1937 did not yield commercial quantities until 1957. But by 1965, oil was a promising source of income. For the promotion of foreign direct investment, the government hired the services of public relations firm Barnet & Reef Associates.

=== Statutory corporations ===
The task of managing the trade and income earned in palm oil kernels was given to the Eastern Nigeria Marketing Board and the Eastern Nigeria Finance Corporation. The Eastern Nigeria Marketing Board came into effect in 1954 and was given the responsibility to manage the region's cash or export crops. The board assigned grade to palm produce according to free fatty acid content and then assigns producer prices to each grade. The board conducts the purchase of palm oil and kernels that are to be exported through the use of licensed buying agents and engages in the evacuation of the produce to the ports for export. Most of the profits from the sales of export produce is transferred to the Eastern Nigeria Development Corporation. The development corporation was involved in producing quality palm oil kernels for the export markets through erection of pioneer oil mills and the development of other export crops such as cocoa, cashew nuts, rubber and coconut. Rice cultivation was also encouraged in Abakaliki and Ogoja.

=== Transportation ===
Community development was one of the initiatives of the NCNC led Eastern regional government in the 1950s and the phrase was also popular among community residents of villages and towns. Part of the initiative of the community development ministry was the clearing of land for passable laterite and earth roads. In 1955 about 13,000 km (8,000 mi) of roads were cleared but less than 10% were tarred. Most travelers use lorries with expressive mottoes such as 'God's time is best' or 'No sweat, No sweat' to move between cities. In the southern parts of region where tidal waterways and swamps dominate the vegetation, barges and river craft are used for transportation.

The Nigerian railway line in the region runs through Enugu, Umuahia, Aba and Port Harcourt. Construction of the railway began in 1913 and completed in 1919. The line was extended to Kaduna in 1926.

The Port of Port Harcourt was the second largest port in Nigeria in the 1950s. In 1954, it cleared about $54 million worth of imports and exports, while the shipping facilities at Calabar cleared $11 million worth of goods.

== Government and politics ==
The region like Nigeria during the first republic operated a parliamentary system of government with a premier leading the executive branch and a bicameral legislature. The figurehead position of governor existed but it was subordinate to the premier. Apart from the regional government, Eastern Nigeria also had a local government modeled after the English system. There were three tiers of governance levels within the system, the county and urban districts, the municipalities and the local councils.

=== History ===
An African dominated government institution, the Eastern Regional Assembly with the powers to debate but not enact laws was established in 1948. It had fifteen nominated African members and fourteen nominated European officials. In 1951, the regional assembly was given more legislative and financial powers following the enactment of the McPherson Constitution. In addition, the assembly number of members in the assembly was enlarged to eighty elected African members, three special members and five officials. Though the NCNC dominated the 1951 election, party organization was not particularly strong because the party's headquarters was in Lagos and its leader did not contest election in the region. Many members elected to the House were previously independent candidates and only declared for the NCNC after their election to get political backing. After a crisis in 1953, party organization was strengthened and in a new election conducted in 1953 and in which Azikiwe, the NCNC leader contested, the party had a decisive victory.

The history of local government representation in the region were in three phases. The first phase was through warrant chiefs many of whom were created by the colonial government. But after the Aba riot of 1929, the system gradually gave way to the Native Authority administration led by older men within the communities. This system was not particularly strong as it was in Northern Nigeria. In the 1950s, local government system following the English model of boroughs county and district councils was introduced.

=== Cabinet of Michael Okpara ===
1960 Eastern Region, Nigeria
Name	Office
Michael Iheonukara Okpara	Premier
Ibanga Udo Akpabio	Internal Affairs
Samuel Efem Imoke	Finance
Patrick Nwokoye Okeke	Agriculture
Basil Charles Okwu	Information
John Ugwu Nwodo	Commerce
Gilbert Ekwenugo Okeke	Education
Michael Oguejiofo Ajegbo	Attorney General
Echeme Emole	Town Planning
Ezekiel Pappah Okoya	Health
Paul Omerenyia Ururuka	Works
Pius Nwoga	Local Government

== Education ==
The village school was an important part of the community. Members of the community at home and abroad voluntarily gave money for the erection of school buildings. Wealthy or salaried family members were encouraged to sponsor the education of their younger ones. In 1956, there were about six thousand primary schools and fifty-four secondary schools. Many of the secondary schools were managed by voluntary agencies and Christian missions and some schools were named after members of the mission including the Hope Waddell Training School, Dennis Memorial, Onitsha, Cornellia Connelly, Uyo and Crowther Memorial, Port Harcourt. Education became a major priority in the late 1950s and early '60s with the regional government at times devoting close to one third of its budget to education. Half of the money was used as subvention given to agencies managing the schools and to ensure a universal primary education programme. The church was instrumental to the education of the people, the Church of Scotland Mission (Later the Presbyterian Church of Nigeria), Figures like, the Dr. E. N. Amaku, Mr. Ntieyong U. Akpan, Justice Egbert Udo Udoma where all educated by the Mission.

University of Nigeria, Nsukka was established by the regional government. An agriculture training and research center was at Umudike.

== Cities and towns ==
The following cities were in the Eastern Region, Nigeria:

- Aba
- Abakaliki
- Abonnema
- Ahoada
- Awka
- Bori City
- Buguma
- Calabar
- Eket
- Enugu
- Igwuruta
- Ikot-Abasi
- Ikot Ekpene
- Nnewi
- Nsukka
- Owo
- Omoku
- Onitsha
- Opobo
- Orlu
- Owerri
- Port Harcourt
- Umuahia
- Uyo
- Yenagoa
- Itu
- Oron

== President of the House of Chiefs ==
Name	Period
Chief Nyong Essien, CMG	? – ?

== Speakers of the House of Assembly ==
Name	Period
Ernest Egbuna	1954 – ?
Eze Daniel Okereke, CMG	? – ?

== Notable people ==
- Paul Ururuka (1910–1970), former Minister of Works and Minister of Commerce

== See also ==
- Igboland
- Northern Region, Nigeria
- Western Region, Nigeria
- Revenue stamps of Eastern Nigeria
- Mid-Western Region, Nigeria

== Sources ==
- Information Service (1956). Eastern Region (Nigeria). Enugu: Enugu, Eastern Nigeria Information Service.
- Van Buer, Franklin (1968). "2". THE STRUCTURE AND ADMINISTRATION OF THE EASTERN NIGERIAN TAX SYSTEM (Thesis). University of Illinois at Urbana-Champaign.
- Diamond, Larry Jay (1988). Class, Ethnicity, and Democracy in Nigeria: The Failure of the First Republic. Syracuse University Press. ISBN 0815624220.
- Igwe, Samuel Okoronkwo (1987). Education in Eastern Nigeria, 1847–1975: Development and Management: Church, State and Community. Evans Brothers. ISBN 023750832X.
- Jones, G.I. (2000). The Trading States of the Oil Rivers: A Study of Political Development in Eastern Nigeria. James Currey Publishers. ISBN 0852559186.
- Groß, Uwe; Wydra, Kerstin, eds. (5 November 2013). Maternal-Child Health: Interdisciplinary Aspects Within the Perspective of Global Health. Universitätsverlag Göttingen. ISBN 978-3863950842.
- Afigbo, Adiele, Eberechukwu (1972). The Warrant Chiefs: indirect rule in southeastern Nigeria, 1891–1929. Longman.
- Ministry of Information, Eastern Region (Nigeria) (1960). Eastern Nigeria. Eastern Nigeria Ministry of Information.
- Okoth, Assa (2006). African nationalism and the de-colonisation process : [1915–1995] (Rev ed.). Nairobi [u.a.]: East African Educational Publ. ISBN 9966253580.
- Ministry of Commerce, Eastern Region (Nigeria) (1966). Investment opportunities in Eastern Nigeria. Govt. Printer.
- Nwaubani, Ebere (2001). The United States and decolonization in West Africa, 1950 – 1960. Rochester, NY: Univ. of Rochester Press. ISBN 1580460763.
- Harris, Philip James (1957). Local Government in Southern Nigeria: A Manual of Law and Procedure Under the Eastern Region Local Government Law, 1955, and the Western Region Local Government Law, 1952. University Press.
- Coleman, James Smoot (1971). Nigeria. University of California Press.
- Mwakikagile, Godfrey (2001). Ethnic politics in Kenya and Nigeria. Huntington, NY: Nova Science Publ. ISBN 1560729678.
- Chuku, Gloria (2015). Igbo Women and Economic Transformation in Southeastern Nigeria, 1900–1960. Routledge. ISBN 978-1135469405.
