= Nigerian region governors and premiers in the First Republic =

This is a list of Nigerian region governors and premiers in the First Republic (1960 - 1966). Nigeria became independent on 1 October 1960 and became a republic on 1 October 1963. On 16 January 1966 a military coup brought Major General Johnson Aguiyi-Ironsi to power, terminating the first period of democratic rule. During this period an appointed governor was nominal head of state while an elected premier led the government.

Region	Period	Governor	Premier	Notes
Eastern Region	Oct 1960 - Jan 1966	Francis Akanu Ibiam	Michael Okpara	
Mid-Western Region	Aug 1963 - Feb 1964	Dennis Osadebay	Dennis Osadebay (Administrator)	Region created from part of Western Region on 8 August 1963
Mid-Western Region	Feb 1964 - Jan 1966	Jereton Mariere	Dennis Osadebay	
Northern Region	Oct 1960 - 1962	Gawain Westray Bell	Ahmadu Bello	
Northern Region	1962 - Jan 1966	Kashim Ibrahim	Ahmadu Bello	
Western Region	Oct 1960 - May 1962	Adesoji Aderemi	Samuel Ladoke Akintola	
Western Region	May 1962 - Dec 1962	Adesoji Aderemi	Moses Majekodunmi (Administrator)	Administrator appointed during political crisis
Western Region	Jan 1963 - Jan 1966	Joseph Fadahunsi	Samuel Akintola	

== See also ==
- List of military governors of Nigerian regions (1966–67)
- List of state governors of Nigeria
