= Effiong =

Effiong is both a surname and a masculine given name, commonly used in Nigeria. Notable people with the name include:

== Surname ==
- Alfred Effiong (born 1984), Maltese international footballer
- Daniel Effiong (born 1972), Nigerian sprinter
- Moses Effiong (1959–2025), Nigerian footballer
- Nelson Effiong (born 1953), Nigerian politician
- Philip Effiong (1925–2003), Nigerian President of Biafra

== Given name ==
- Effiong Dickson Bob (born 1959), Nigerian politician
- Effiong Okon Eyo (1918–1983), Nigerian politician
- Effiong Okon (born 1985), Nigerian boxer
