= Ibanga Akpabio =

Nigerian educator and government official

Ibanga Akpabio was a Nigerian educator and government official who was a regional Minister of Education and later of Internal Affairs in the Eastern region, during Nigeria's first republic.

== Life ==
=== Early life and education ===
Akpabio was the son of a warrant chief, Udo Akapbio of Ukana, Ikot Ntuen in Ikot Ekpene Division. He qualified as a higher elementary school teacher and began his teaching career at a Methodist missionary school in Ikot Ekpene. Apart from teaching, Akpabio took correspondence and postal overseas courses while he also made time available for cultural and social organizations such as the Ibibio State Union, where he was a member of its Ikot Ekpene branch. The union later supported Akpabio quest for further education with a scholarship to study in America. In America, Akpabio attended classes at Tuskegee Institute, Howard University and Lincoln University before transferring to Columbia University from where he graduated in 1941. While studying, he became acquainted with fellow Africans students such as Mbonu Ojike both of whom later served as president of the African Student Association of the United States and Canada. During the later stages of his study, wartime currency controls stopped scholarship funds from Nigeria, Akpabio had to find other jobs to fund his living expenses, he also qualified for a Phelp-Stokes Scholarship. Just before the end of World War II, Akpabio returned to Nigeria by sea via Portugal to Angola then to Congo and finally to Lagos. The journey ended up taking five months from his date of departure from Philadelphia.

==== Ibibio State College ====
In Nigeria, Akpabio's ambition was to establish a school for children of his kinsmen. With the support of the Ibibio State Union, Akpabio co-founded Ibibio State College in 1946. The college did not qualify from grant-aid from the colonial government, Akpabio and a few other African owned school proprietors including Eyo Ita and Alvan Ikoku then formed a pressure group to solve the problems of African run voluntary agencies and schools in Eastern Nigeria.

=== Political career ===
Akpabio met Zik when the latter toured the country on a fund raising mission to lead an NCNC delegation to London in protest of a new constitution. In the 1950s, when constitutional development allowed Africans into elective positions, Akpabio was aligned with NCNC. In 1951, he became chairman of Ikot Ekpene Urban District Council, a new local government body set up by the regional government. Later in December 1951, Akpabio was elected to the Eastern Regional House of Assembly which was followed by his selection to represent his district in the Federal House of Representative under an electoral college system. During an internal crisis in NCNC, Akpabio, Nyong Essien and Effiong Okon Eyo sided with Azikiwe's faction unlike some of their Ibibio political colleagues who moved to the United National Independence Party. Okon Eyo later fell out with Zik in 1956. When Azikiwe became premier in 1954, Akpabio was appointed the regional Minister of Education. Under his leadership, the government approved grant-aid for some African run schools and also experimented with universal primary education in the region. In 1957, Akpabio was transferred to the Minister of Internal Affairs.
