= Ruder Finn =

Public relations firm with co-headquarters in the United States and China

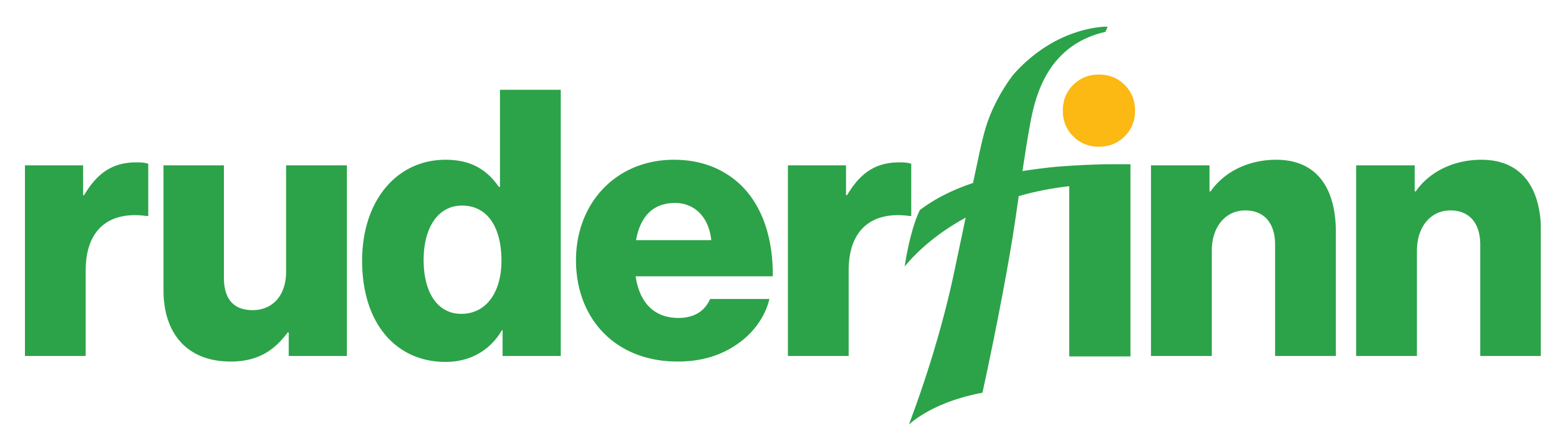
- Type: Private
- Industry: Communications; Public Relations; Marketing
- Founded: 1948; 78 years ago
- Founder: David Finn; Bill Ruder
- Headquarters: New York City
- Area served: Global
- Key people: Kathy Bloomgarden (CEO); Nick Leonard (managing director, UK); Elan Shou (managing director, Asia); Shivaram Lakshminarayan (managing director, India); Michael Schubert (Chief Innovation Officer); Peggy Walsh (Chief Operating Officer); Ian Glover (Chief Financial Officer); Tejas Totade (Chief Technology Officer, Head of AI); Adeline Phun (General Manager, Kuala Lumpur, Malaysia); Sophie Simpson (Managing Director, Middle East)
- Number of employees: 1,350 (2026)
- Website: www.ruderfinn.com

Ruder Finn is a public relations firm founded in New York City in 1948 by David Finn and Bill Ruder. The privately held agency is headquartered in the United States and has worked with clients in industries such as technology, healthcare, brand experience, corporate reputation, workplace, and has advised both corporate and government organizations.

Since 2011, the company has been led by CEO Kathy Bloomgarden, who is David Finn's daughter.

== History ==
=== Origins: 1948–2000s ===
Ruder Finn was established in 1948 in New York by David Finn and Bill Ruder.

The firm's first client was country singer Perry Como. Its success at promoting Como attracted more clients in show business, including Dinah Shore and Jack Lemmon. Ruder Finn eventually expanded to represent consumer product companies and government agencies.

During the 1960s, Ruder Finn provided public relations support for the U.S. government's efforts related to the Partial Nuclear Test Ban Treat signed under President Kennedy.

David Finn advised on the curation of the PepsiCo Donald M. Kendall Sculpture Gardens, helping assemble a collection of twentieth-century outdoor artworks. His involvement reflected a long-standing commitment to expanding public access to modern art.

In 1979, David Finn and Bill Ruder were hired to handle the promotion of the new Pritzker Prize, founded by the owners of Hyatt Hotels, Jay and Cindy Pritzker.

In 1981, Ruder Finn merged with Harse-Rotman & Druck, that had previously acquired Barnet & Reef Associates, in an operation that was at the time the largest merger of two public relations firms.

In 1985 Ruder Finn executed the "Glad Bag-A-Thon," the nation's largest organized clean-up and recycling initiative, in partnership with Glad Bags and Keep America Beautiful.

During this time, Ruder Finn advised Philip Morris (now Altria), on public relations strategies related to growing health concerns about smoking. Ruder Finn recommended adopting public information policies that acknowledge health risks, such as including warnings on advertisements and deferring to medical authorities on scientific findings.

In 1997, Ruder Finn ran the Global Climate Coalition, a group of mainly United States businesses opposing action to reduce greenhouse gas emissions.

In 1999, Ruder Finn established RFI Studios, a digital practice, to help clients protect and build their reputation online. The agency expanded in Asia, establishing offices in Shanghai, Beijing, Hong Kong, Guangzhou, Singapore, Delhi, Mumbai and Bangalore.

In 2005, pro bono work done for the UN raised speculation when Kofi Annan's nephew, Kobina, worked as an intern at the firm. Ruder Finn was not awarded any U.N. contract because of Kobina's employment.

These decades laid the groundwork for future growth under the leadership of David Finn's daughter, Kathy Bloomgarden, who became the firm's CEO and expanded their international presence into China.

=== 2010s ===
Kathy Bloomgarden, Finn's daughter, became CEO when he retired in 2011. That year Ruder Finn acquired Thunder Communications, a Chinese event management, brand and marketing consultancy, and formed a partnership with Kyodo Public Relations.

In the 2010s, Ruder Finn partnered with Novartis on meningitis campaigns, "Meningitis: Keep Watching" and "Protecting Our Tomorrows," featuring photography by Anne Geddes and collaborations with Meningitis Research Foundations, Meningitis Trust, and Meningitis UK. The campaigns earned a Bronze Lion at Cannes Health.

In 2012, Ruder Finn accepted a controversial contract from the government of Maldives that was condemned by the Commonwealth of Nations for organizing a political coup d'état that led to the fall of the first democratically elected President of the Maldives. Vice-president of Ruder Finn Emmanuel Tchividjian "admitted there were 'diverse points of views' surrounding the circumstances around the change of government" The Commonwealth Ministerial Action Group reiterated its call for early elections to be held in the Maldives.

The agency has won the PRSA Bronze Anvils, Big Apple Awards, SABREs and PRWeek Awards. David Finn received a Big Apple Award.

In 2015, Ruder Finn acquired the Japanese business of Kyodo Public Relations, one of the largest independent PR firms in Japan and the first PR agency to be listed on JASDAQ Securities Exchange.

In 2018, Ruder Finn launched rf.techlab, an analytics and emerging technology incubator, supporting the development of proprietary offerings in data science, machine learning, and artificial intelligence. In 2019, they introduced rf.relate, a practice focused on advocacy, sustainability, and public affairs that develops social impact campaigns connecting communities with representative organizations.

=== 2020s ===
In June 2020, Saudi Crown Prince Mohammed bin Salman's Neom city project signed a $1.7 million contract with Ruder Finn that seemed to be an effort to counter criticism and controversies surrounding the project and its founder, such as mass arrests, the assassination of Jamal Khashoggi, and conflict over forced evictions on Howeitat tribal land. The firm has since ceased working with Neom.

In July 2020, Ruder Finn acquired the video content studio Osmosis Films, headquartered in Brooklyn, New York.

In 2021, Huawei spent $3.5 million with Ruder Finn according to media reports and public records. In 2023, the two companies ended their partnership.

In 2021, Ruder Finn was ranked 30th on the Global Top 250 PR Agency Ranking.

In October 2023 Ruder Finn was named the PR Agency of the Year. This award was given at the Medical Marketing and Media Awards (MM+M), in New York. In the same month, Ruder Finn acquired Pandan Social, a Malaysian firm that was founded in 2018. The same year Ruder Finn established rf.studio53, rf.engage, and rf.Digital.

In March 2024, Ruder Finn acquired the digital marketing agency Flightpath.

In 2024, Ruder Finn formed an AI Advisory Council chaired by Zack Kass, formerly of OpenAI, to advise clients on AI adoptions and product innovation across practices. The same year, they introduced an agency generative engine optimization tool, called rf.aio. It was developed with influenceAI to help brands track and improve how they appear in large language model results.

On January 28, 2025, the New York City Mayor's Office proclaimed "David Finn Day" in honor of Ruder Finn's founder and the business. To commemorate the occasion, Ruder Finn donated the David Finn Archive to the Museum of Public Relations.

The 2025 PRWeek Agency Business Report recognized Ruder Finn for distinction in culture and new business.

The Ruder Finn Group is made up of wholly owned subsidiaries including Touchdown, Peppercomm, RF Comunicad, Mantis, Flightpath, Atteline, Pandan Social, Missouri Creative, and Big Sky Communications.

== Clients ==
Ruder Finn's clients have included companies in healthcare, technology, and consumer industries such as Pfizer, Adobe, Hewlett Packard Enterprise, L'Oréal, BMW/Mini, and MetLife.
