= Paul Ururuka =

Nigerian politician (1910–1970)

Paul Omerenyia Ururuka (1910-1970) was a former Minister of Works in the Old Eastern Region of Nigeria and a former Minister of Commerce, and of Transport in the Administration of Dr. Michael Okpara, the Premier of Eastern Nigeria. In 1965, he was conferred with the National Honour of the Commander of the Federal Republic (CFR) by the President, Rt. Hon. Dr. Nnamdi Azikiwe, in recognition of his services to Nigeria.

== Early life and education ==
Ururuka was born in 1910 in Umunkpeyi, Nvosi, Isiala Ngwa South of Abia State, Nigeria to Mr. Ururuka Ajereh and Orianu Ururuka Ajereh. He obtained his Standard Six Certificate with distinction from Christ the King School, Aba. He later enrolled at the St. Charles Teachers' Training College, Onitsha, obtaining a Teacher Grade II and later Grade I Certificates and subsequently enrolled for the General Certificate of Education, London as a private student. For further education, Ururuka proceeded to the Trinity College, Dublin, where he obtained a Bachelor of Arts in Geography and an MSc in Geography.

== Career ==
Ururuka was elected in 1954 to represent Ngwaland in the Eastern Region House of Assembly, and was later appointed Minister in the Cabinet of Dr. Nnamdi Azikiwe and Dr. Michael Okpara. He held several cabinet positions in the Eastern Region.

== Statue and immortalization ==
A statue of Ururuka was erected at the Obikabia Junction in Aba by Dr. Okezie Ikpeazu, the then Governor of Abia State to immortalise him. Ururuka is fondly remembered for bringing infrastructural development to Ngwa land, and for building strong and durable road networks which have stood the test of time, facilitating commerce, logistics and road travel.
