= David Finn =

American public relations executive, art historian, and photographer (1921–2021)

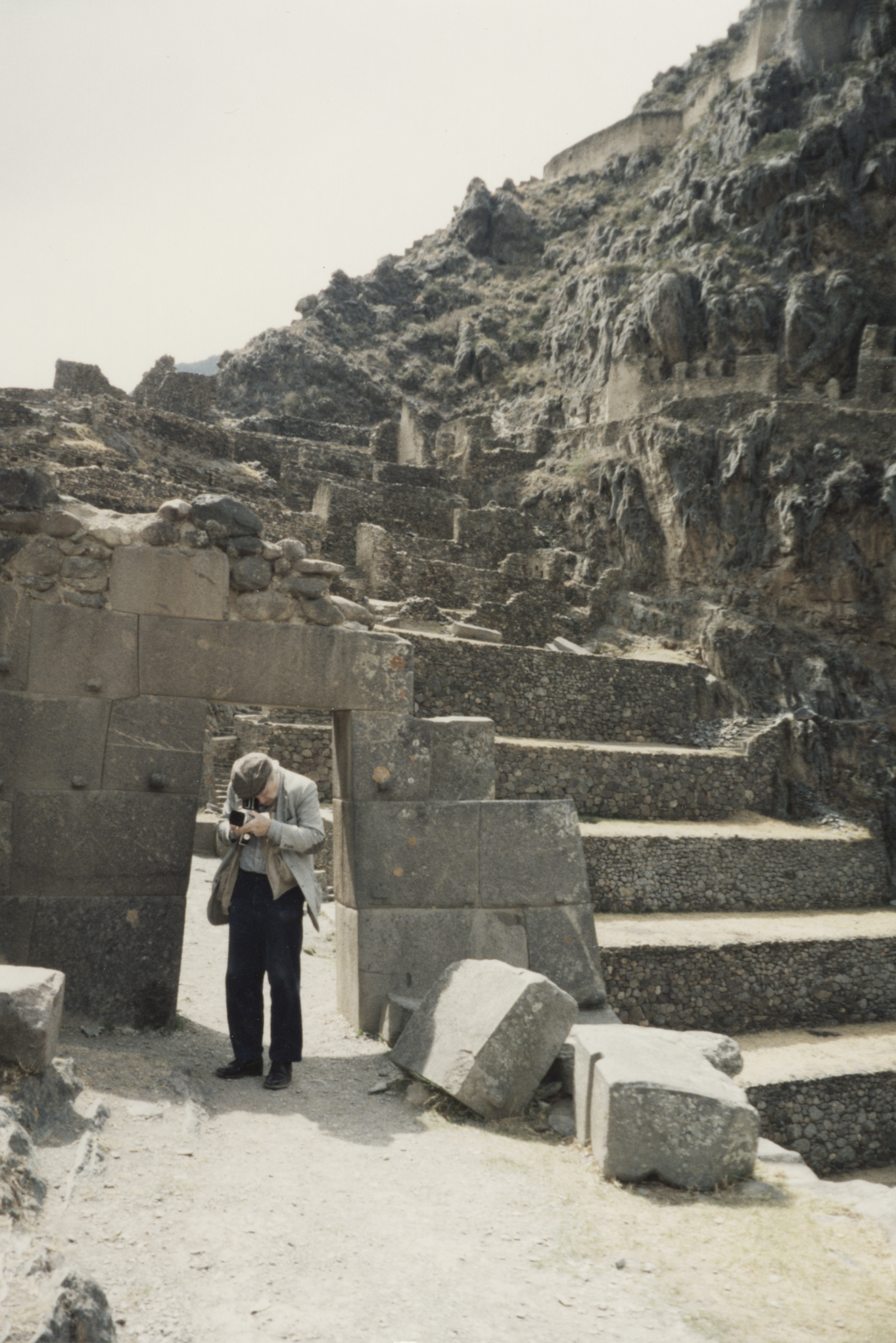
- David Finn at Machu Picchu
- Born: David Finkelstein; August 30, 1921; New York City, U.S.
- Died: October 18, 2021 (aged 100); New Rochelle, New York, U.S.
- Education: City College of New York
- Occupations: Public relations executive, art historian, photographer

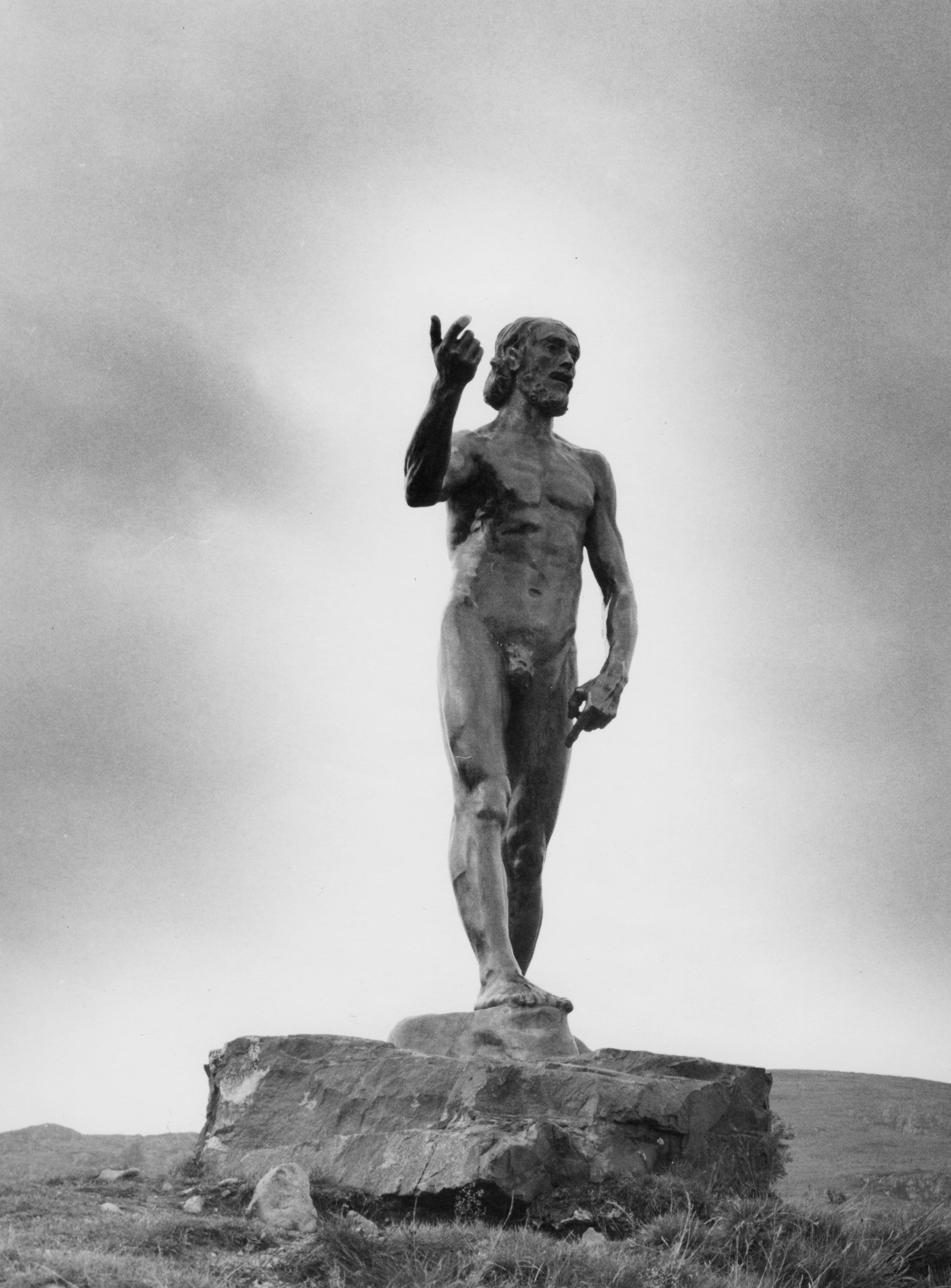
Auguste Rodin, Saint John the Baptist Preaching (c.1880), photographed by David Finn

David Finn (born Finkelstein, August 30, 1921 – October 18, 2021) was an American public relations executive, photographer, and historian of sculpture. He is known in public relations as a co-founder of the Ruder Finn firm. In addition to his career in public relations, Finn was a lifelong historian and photographer of sculpture.

== Early life ==
Finn was born David Finkelstein in New York City on August 30, 1921. His father, Jonathan (1885–1971), worked as a writer; his mother, Sadie (Borgenicht), created dresses for children. His father, who employed Finn as his pen name, changed the family name when David was in high school. Finn enrolled in the City College of New York in 1939 and graduated with a bachelor's degree four years later. He then served briefly in the Army Air Forces during World War II.

== Career ==
Finn co-founded the Ruder Finn public relations agency in 1948 along with Bill Ruder. Over the years, his clients included Perry Como, John D. Rockefeller III, and John F. Kennedy, among many others. Ruder Finn has also represented many Fortune 500 companies, universities, not-for-profit organizations, and foreign governments.

== Historian of sculpture ==
Finn was also an influential historian, author and photographer of sculpture. Besides contributing his photography to books by art historians, he wrote articles about sculpture for the Congressional newspaper Roll Call and the National Sculpture Society's quarterly journal Sculpture Review, which he headed as editor-in-chief during the 1990s. His photographs have appeared in over 100 books on the history of sculpture, many of which he authored. Finn's photographs of sculpture have been exhibited at the Metropolitan Museum of Art, the Italian Academy for Advanced Studies in America at Columbia University, L'Orangerie in Paris, the American Cultural Center in Madrid, the Art Gallery of Ontario, and the Municipal Art Society in New York.

Finn applied an artistic style to his photographs of sculpture. He employed raking light and high-contrast black and white to emphasize the drama and three-dimensionality of sculpture. In addition to overall shots, he often focused on close-ups and details, which allowed him to isolate and abstract small sections of his subjects. This idiosyncratic style earned him favor with contemporary sculptors like Henry Moore, whose work Finn photographed extensively.

== David Finn Archive ==
Finn donated his archive of photographs to the Department of Image Collections, National Gallery of Art Library, Washington, DC in 2016, where it contributes to the department's goal of providing a visual record for the study of art. The David Finn Archive includes over 140,000 images in various forms, including photographic prints, negatives, and transparencies. The subjects represented in the archive span the history of sculpture and range from figural to abstract. Finn photographed both Western and non-Western sculpture, including major works from the European canon from the 12th to the 21st centuries, and examples of sculpture from Mesoamerican, Oceanic, and many other traditions.

Finn photographed the works of important contemporary sculptors, such as Henry Moore and Eduardo Chillida. He was noted for capturing well-known sculptures from novel angles, like many of his in situ photographs of monumental sculpture. The collection includes many of the original photographs that Finn used for his publications on various topics related to sculptural history. Much of the collection is digitized and available for viewing at the Department of Image Collections, National Gallery of Art Library website.

== Personal life ==
Finn married Laura Zeisler in 1945. She was classmates at Hunter College with his younger sister, Helen. They remained married until his death. Together, they had four children: Kathy, Dena, Amy, and Peter.

Finn died at the age of 100 on October 18, 2021, at his home in New Rochelle, New York.

== Gallery ==
Photographs by David Finn in the David Finn Archive, National Gallery of Art Library, Washington, DC.

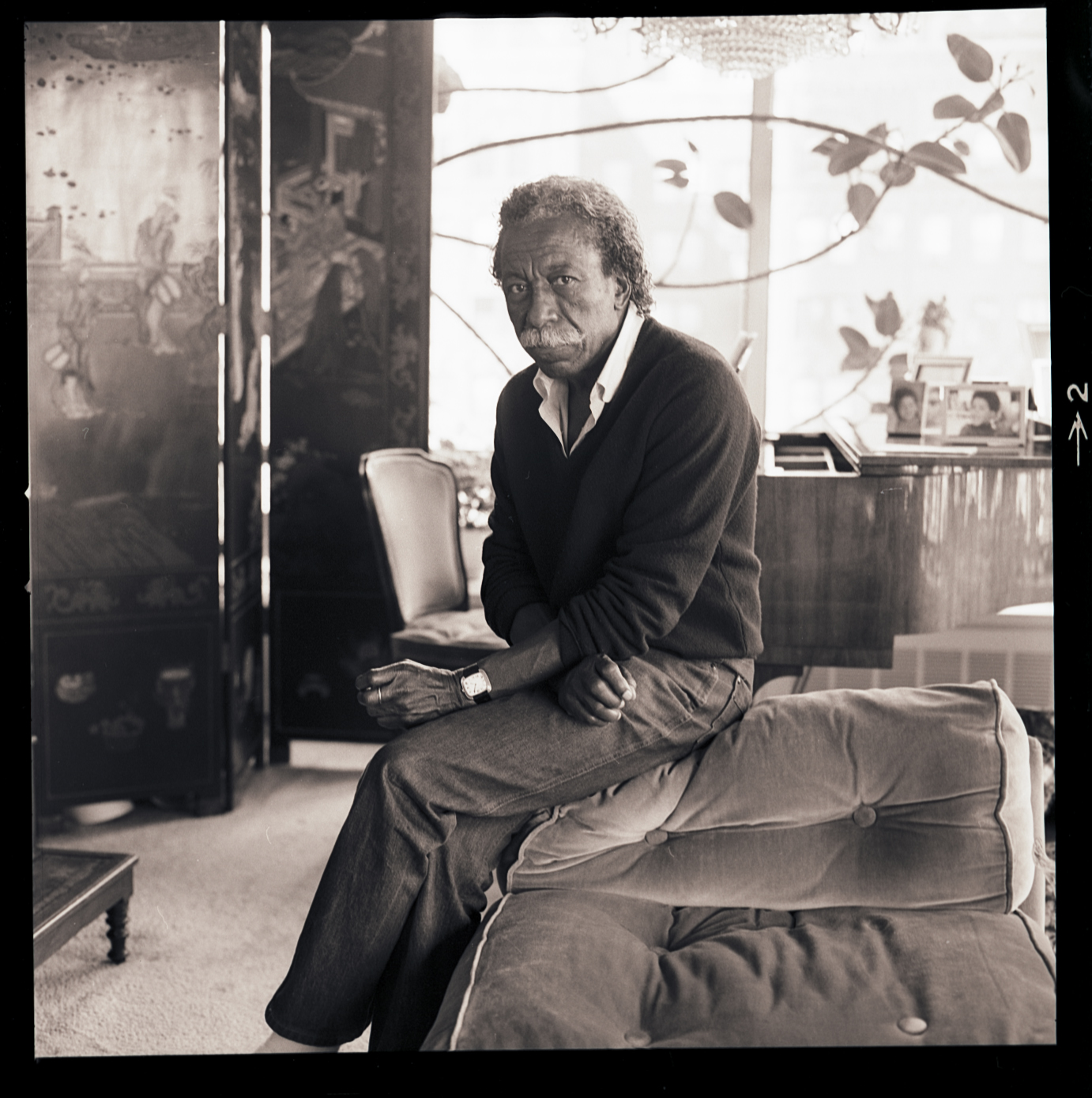
Gordon Parks next to his piano, late 1980s

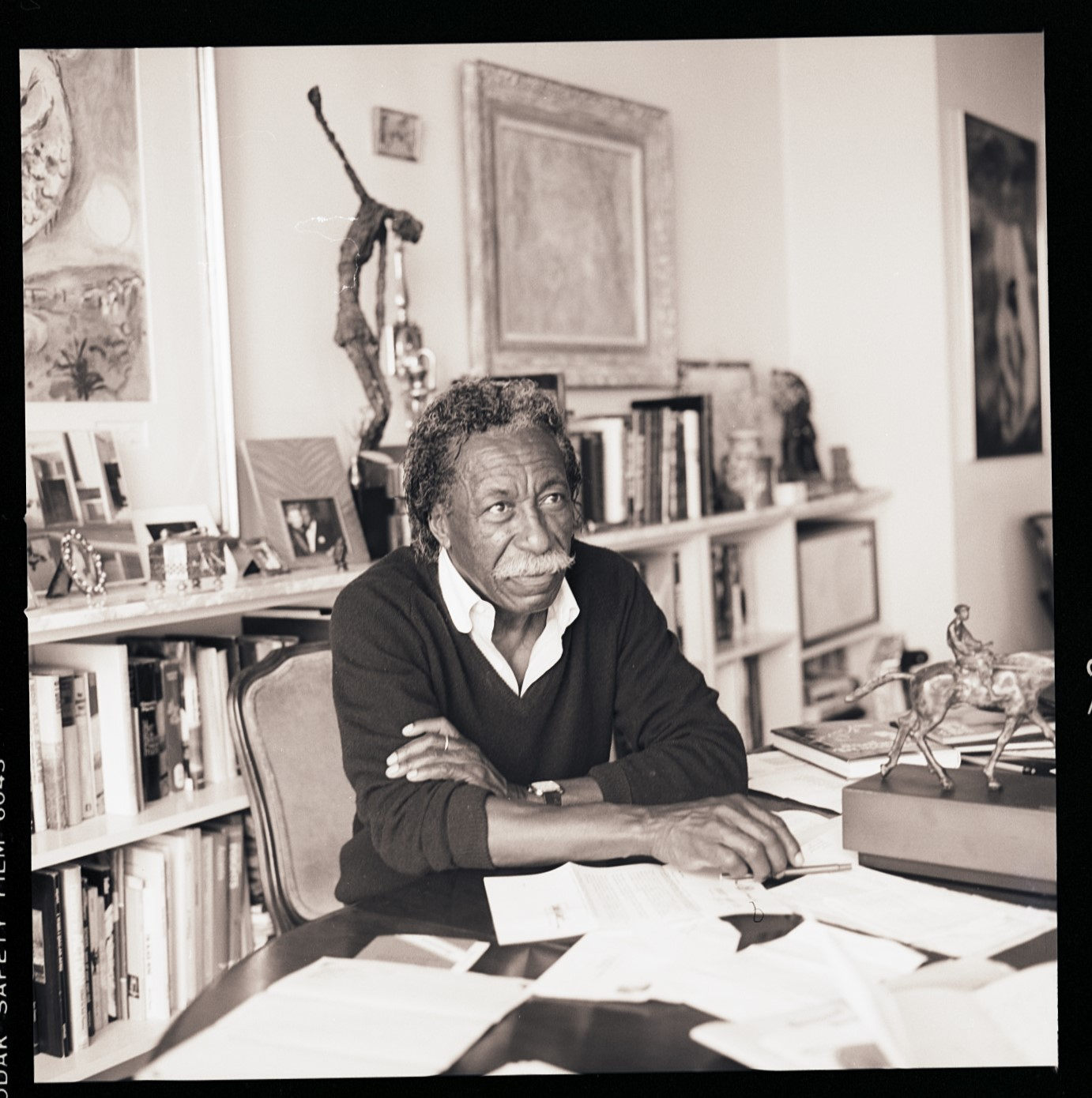
Gordon Parks in his study, late 1980s

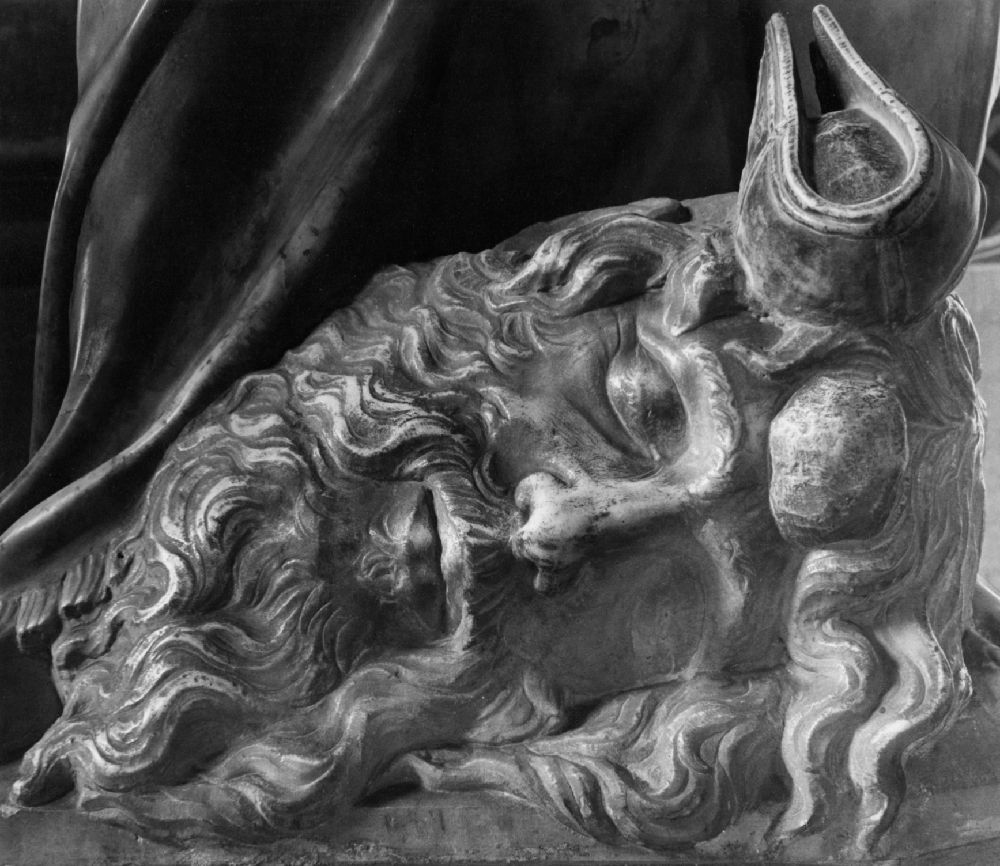
Donatello, detail of David with the Head of Goliath, c. 1408–1409

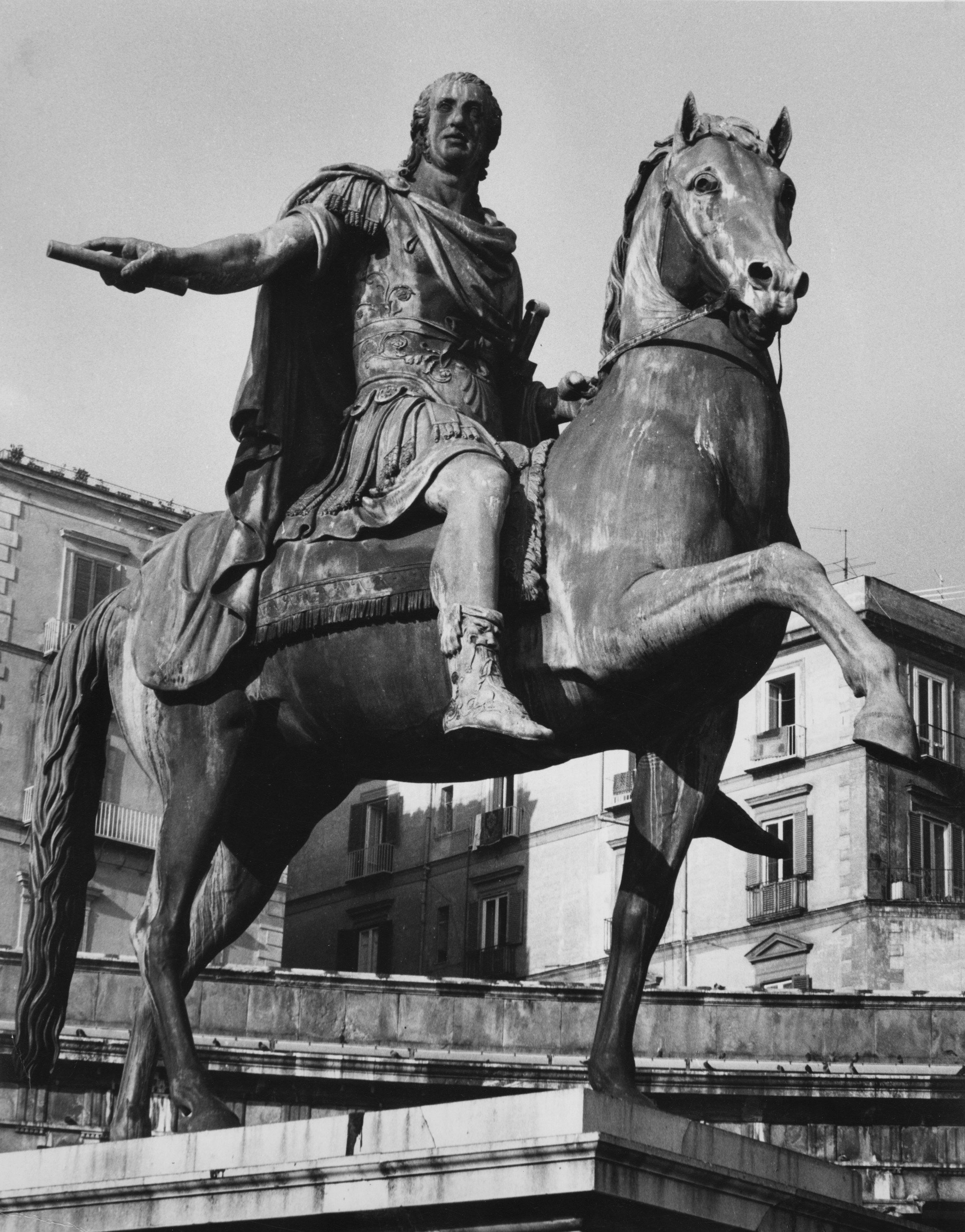
Antonio Canova, Equestrian Monument to Charles III, c. 1807–1819

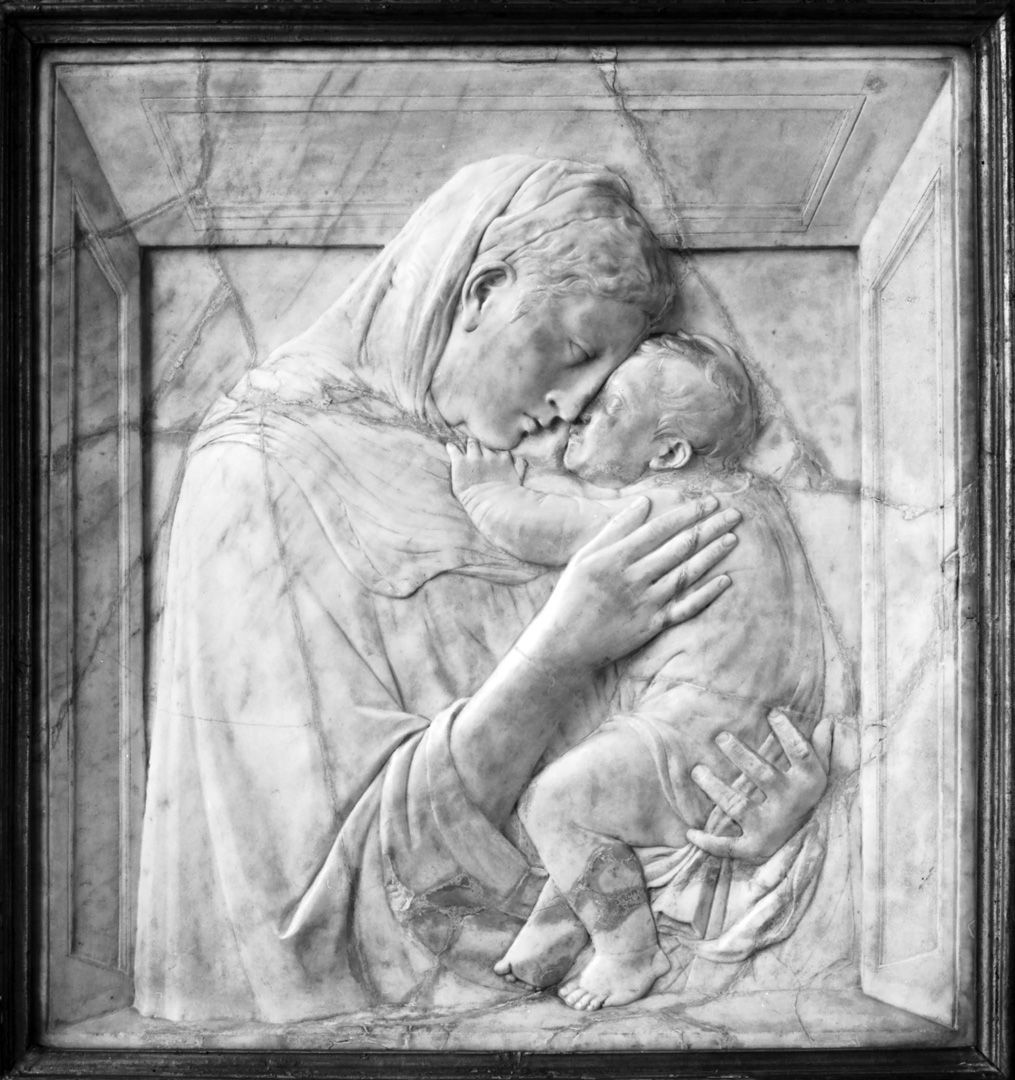
Donatello, Pazzi Madonna, c. 1422, Bode-Museum, Berlin

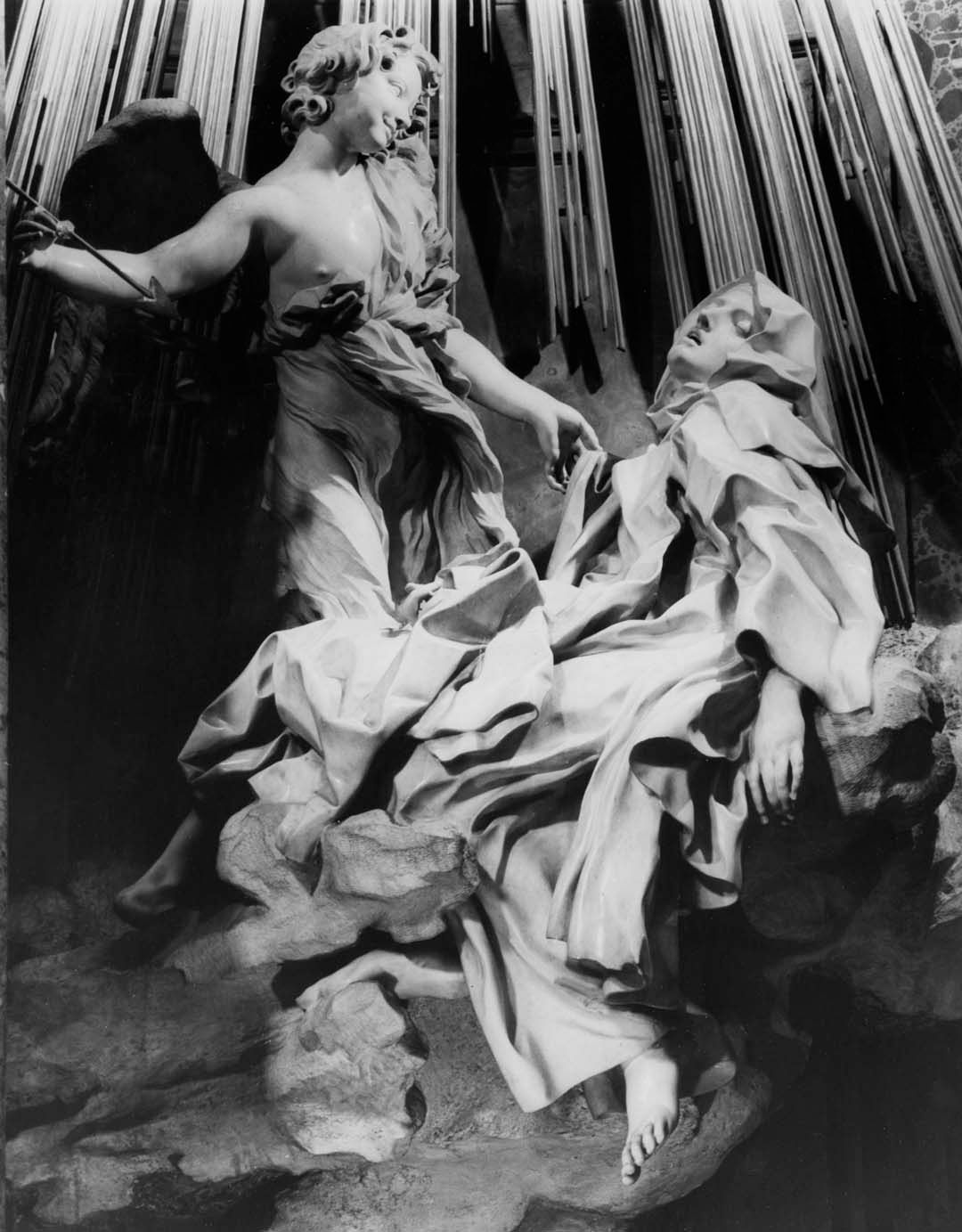
Gian Lorenzo Bernini, Ecstasy of Saint Theresa, c. 1644-52, Santa Maria della Vittoria, Rome

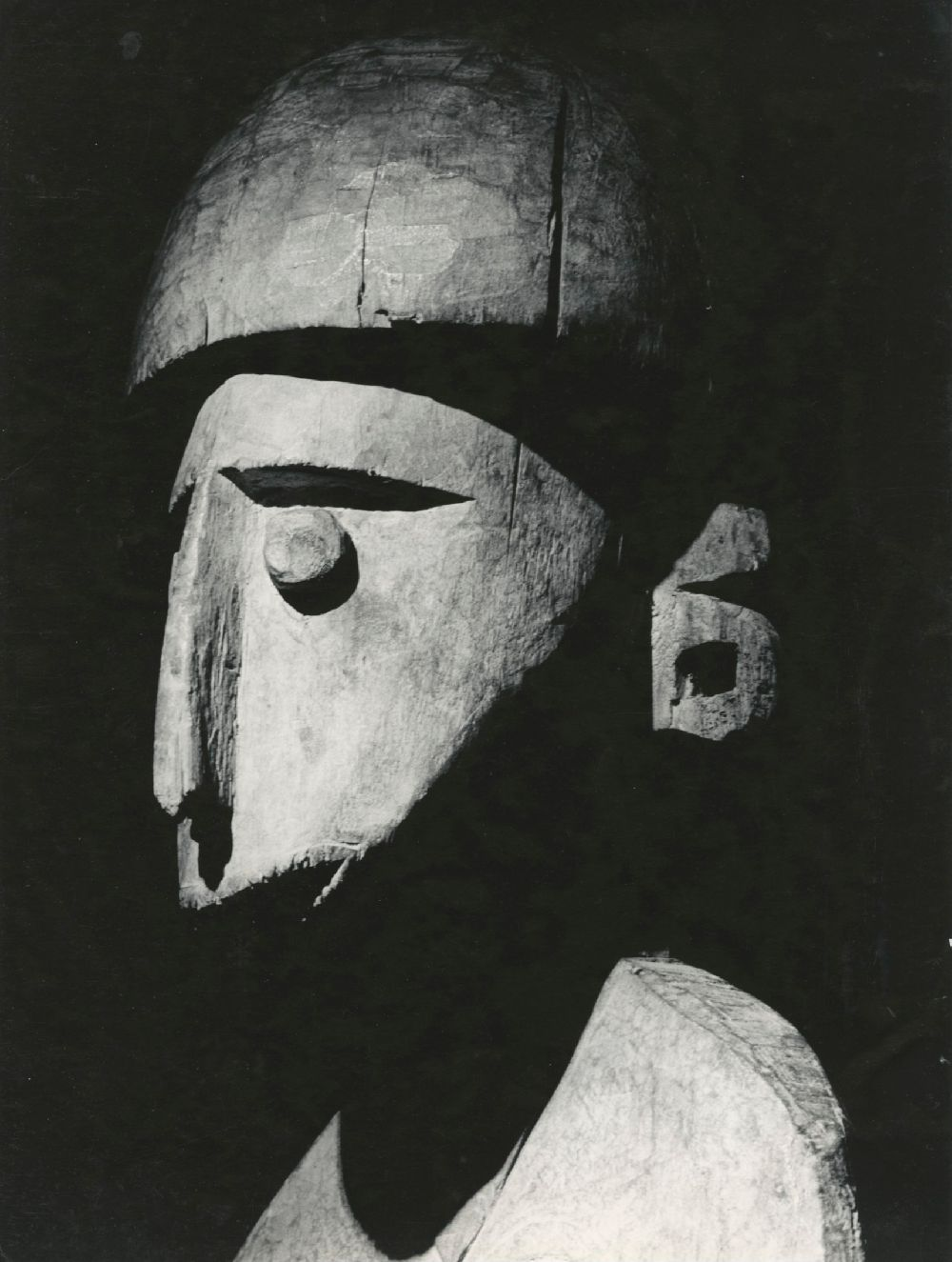
Anonymous, detail of Male Figure, Madang Province, Papua New Guinea

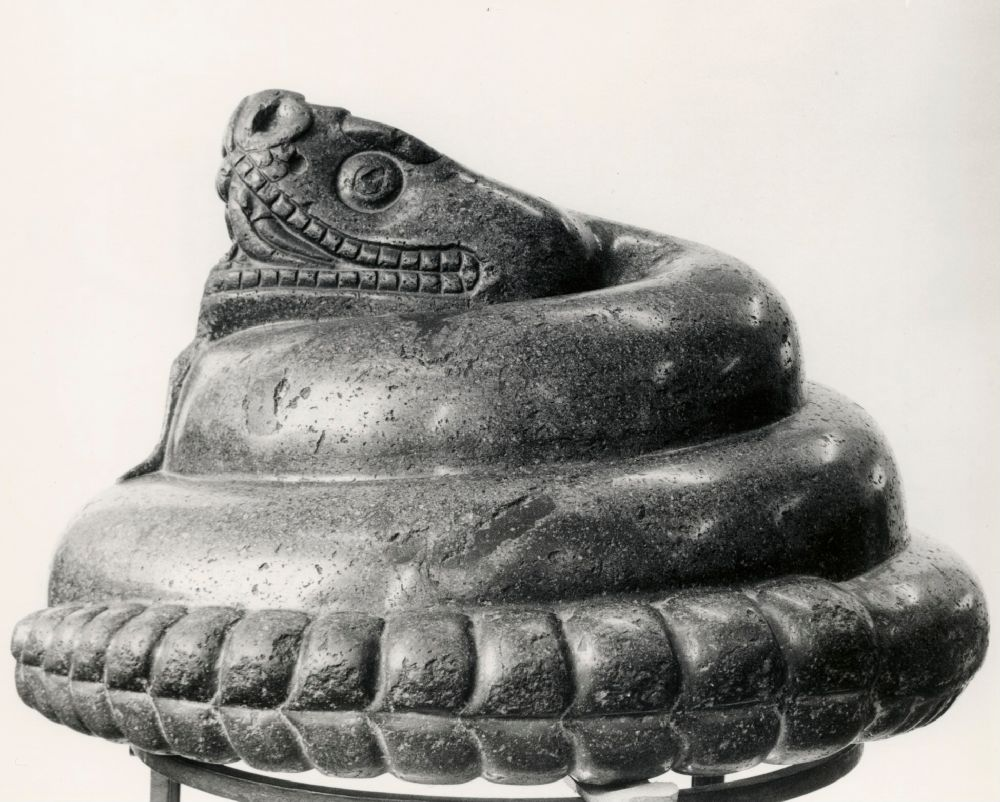
Anonymous Aztec, Coiled Serpent, Late-Post Classic Period, British Museum, London

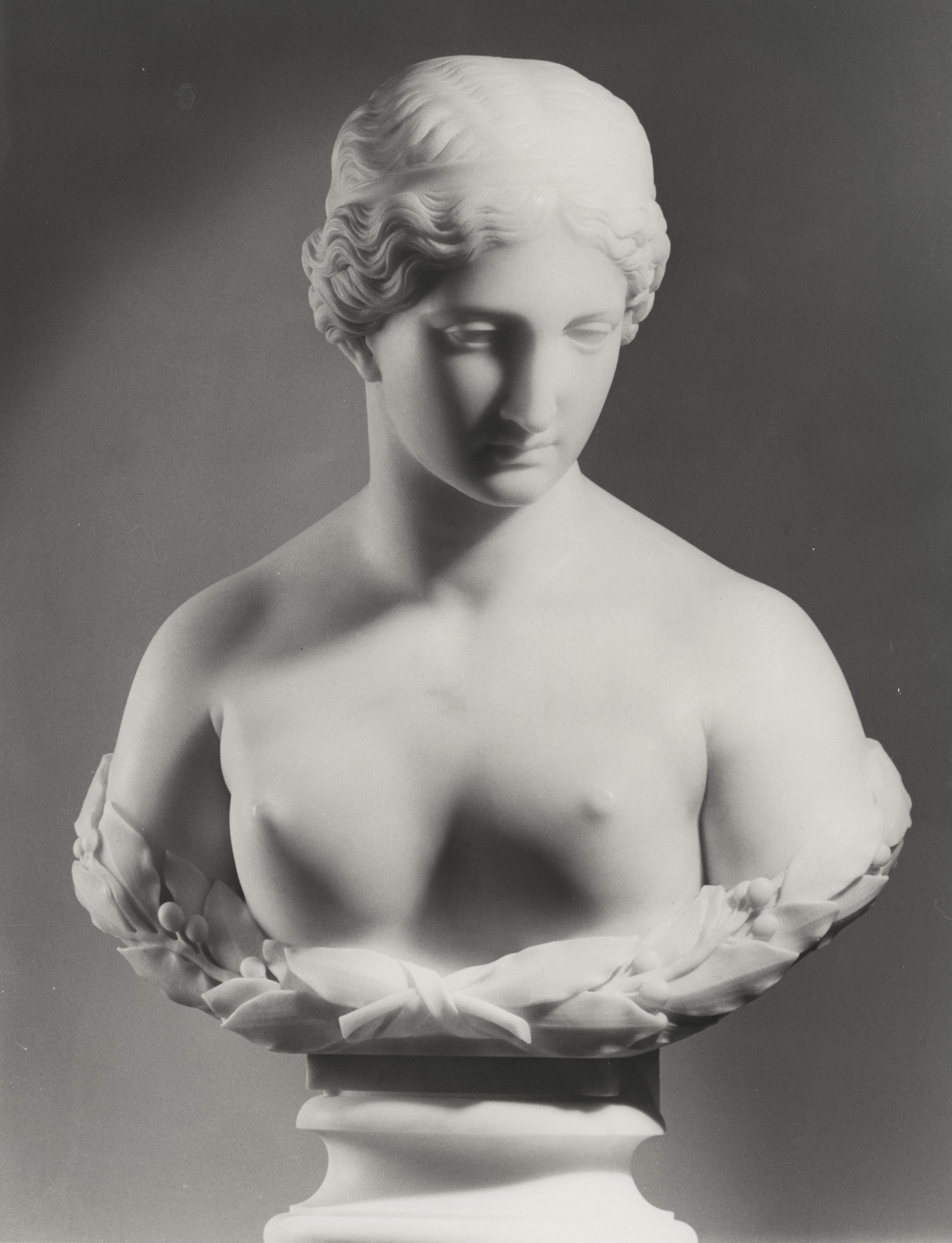
Harriet Goodhue Hosmer, Daphne, modeled 1853

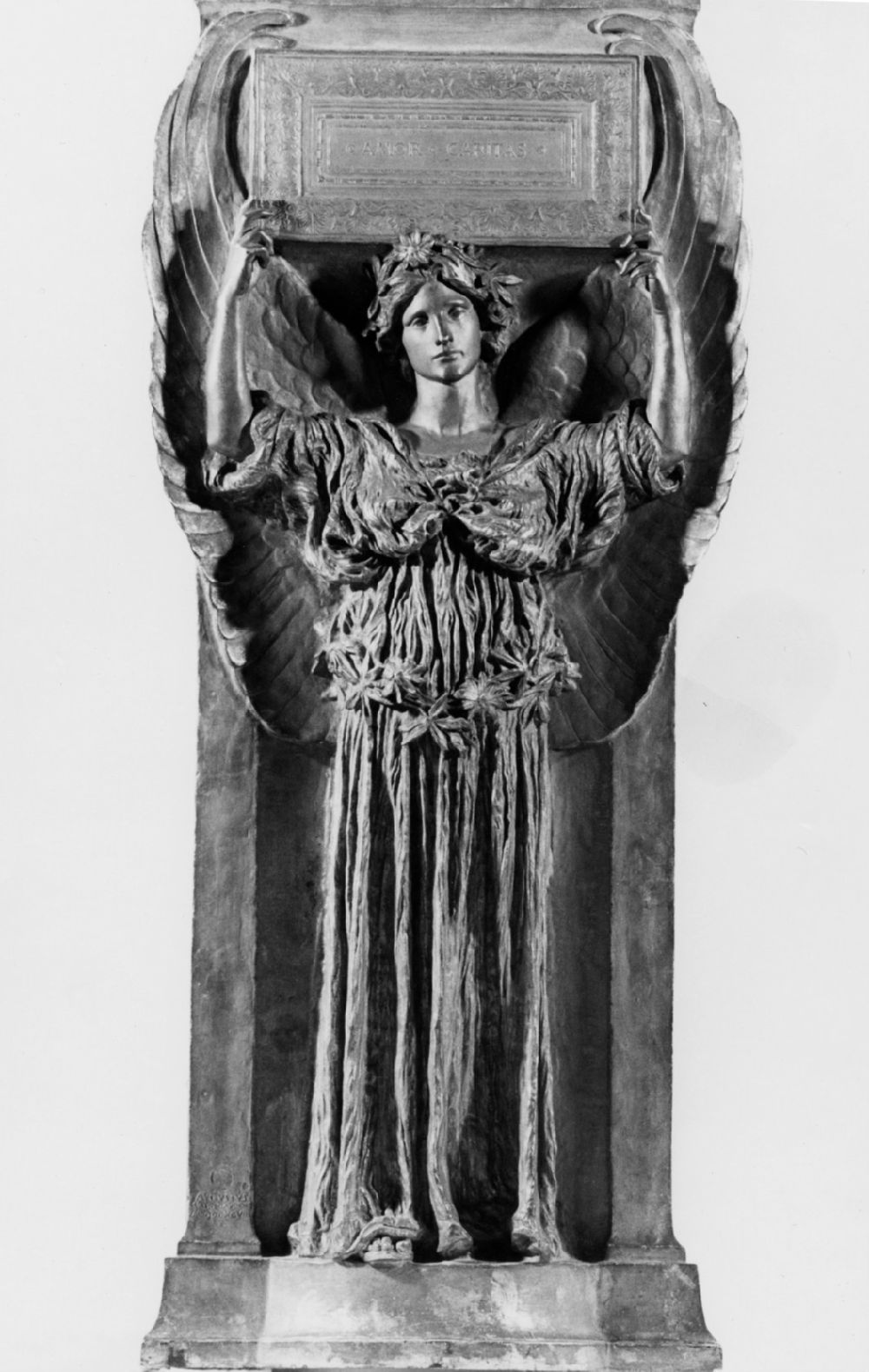
Augustus Saint-Gaudens, Amor Caritas, c.1880-1898, Saint-Gaudens National Historic Site

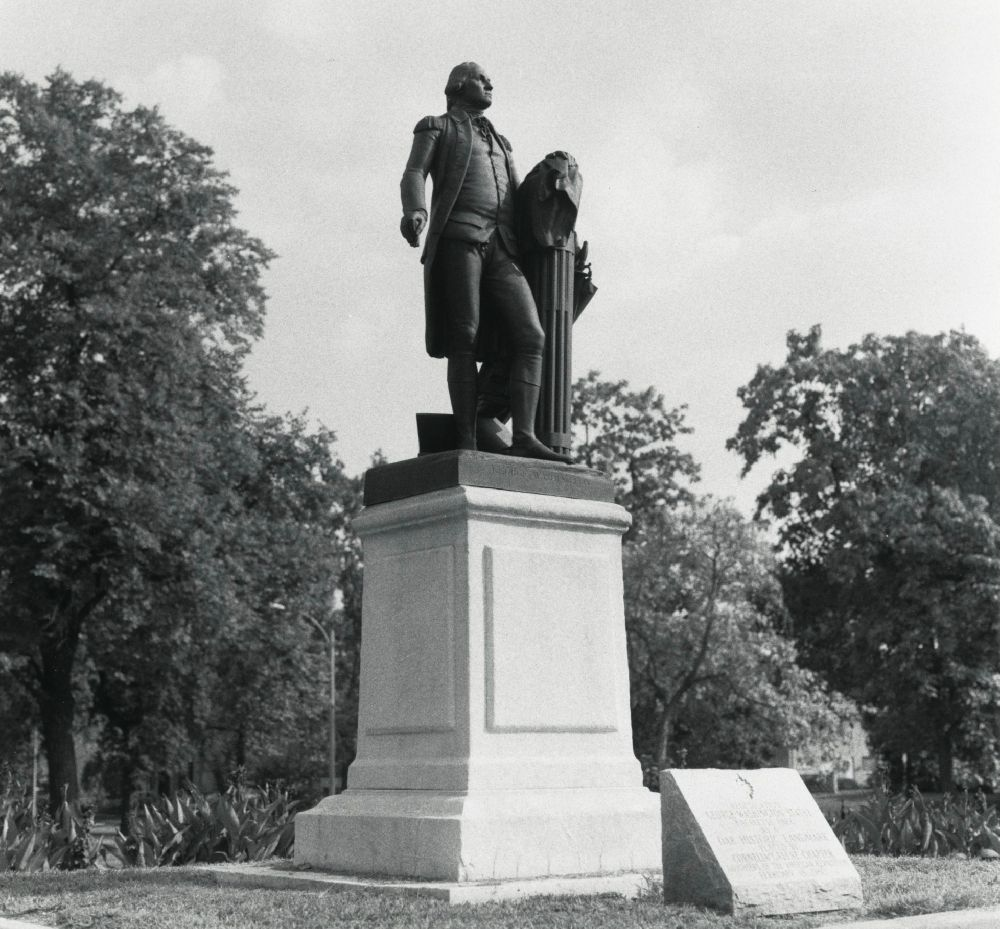
Jean-Antoine Houdon, George Washington, modeled 1788, cast 1869, St. Louis, Missouri

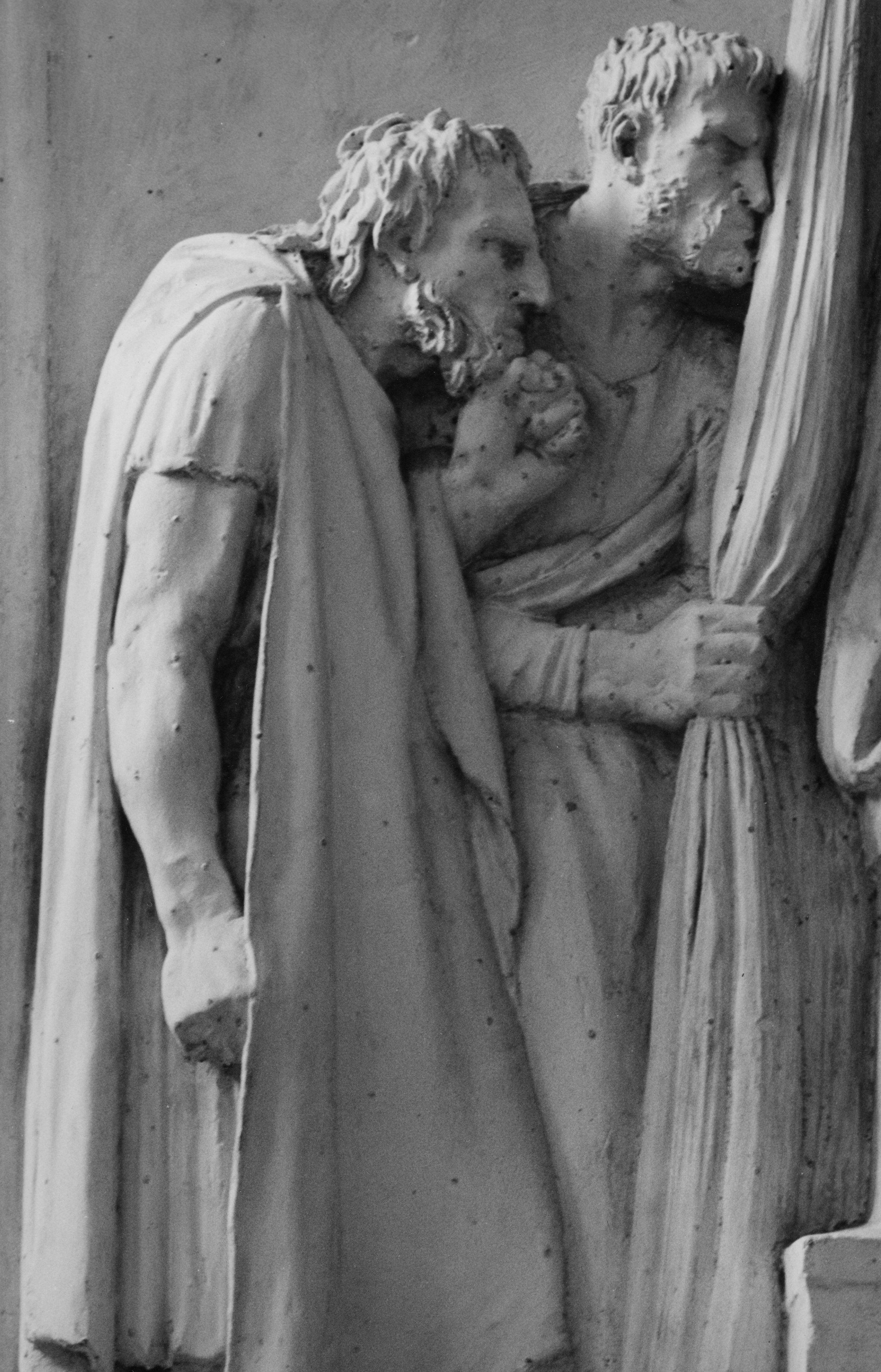
Antonio Canova, detail of The Trial of Socrates, c. 1790–1792

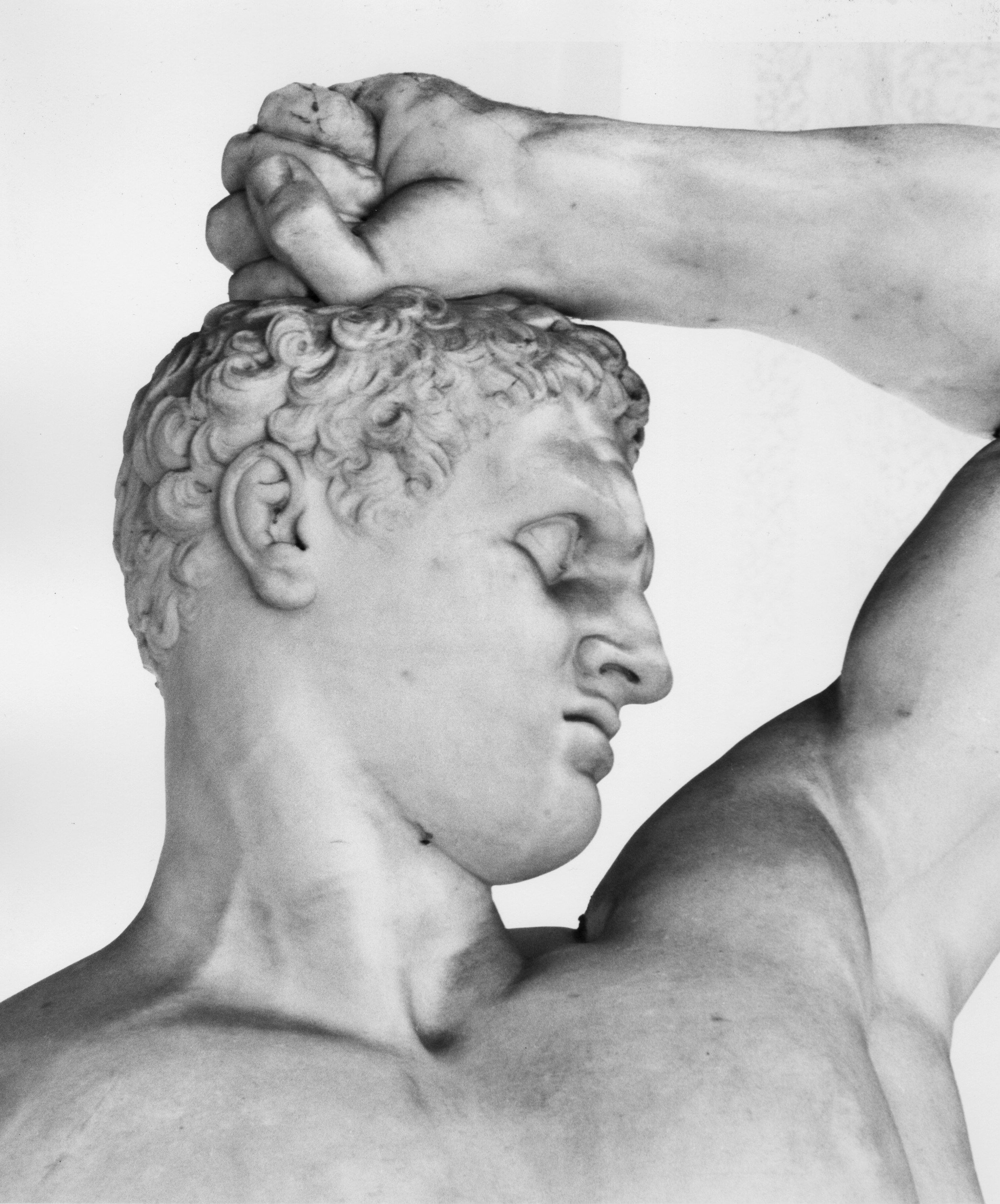
Antonio Canova, detail of Creugas, c. 1795–1801

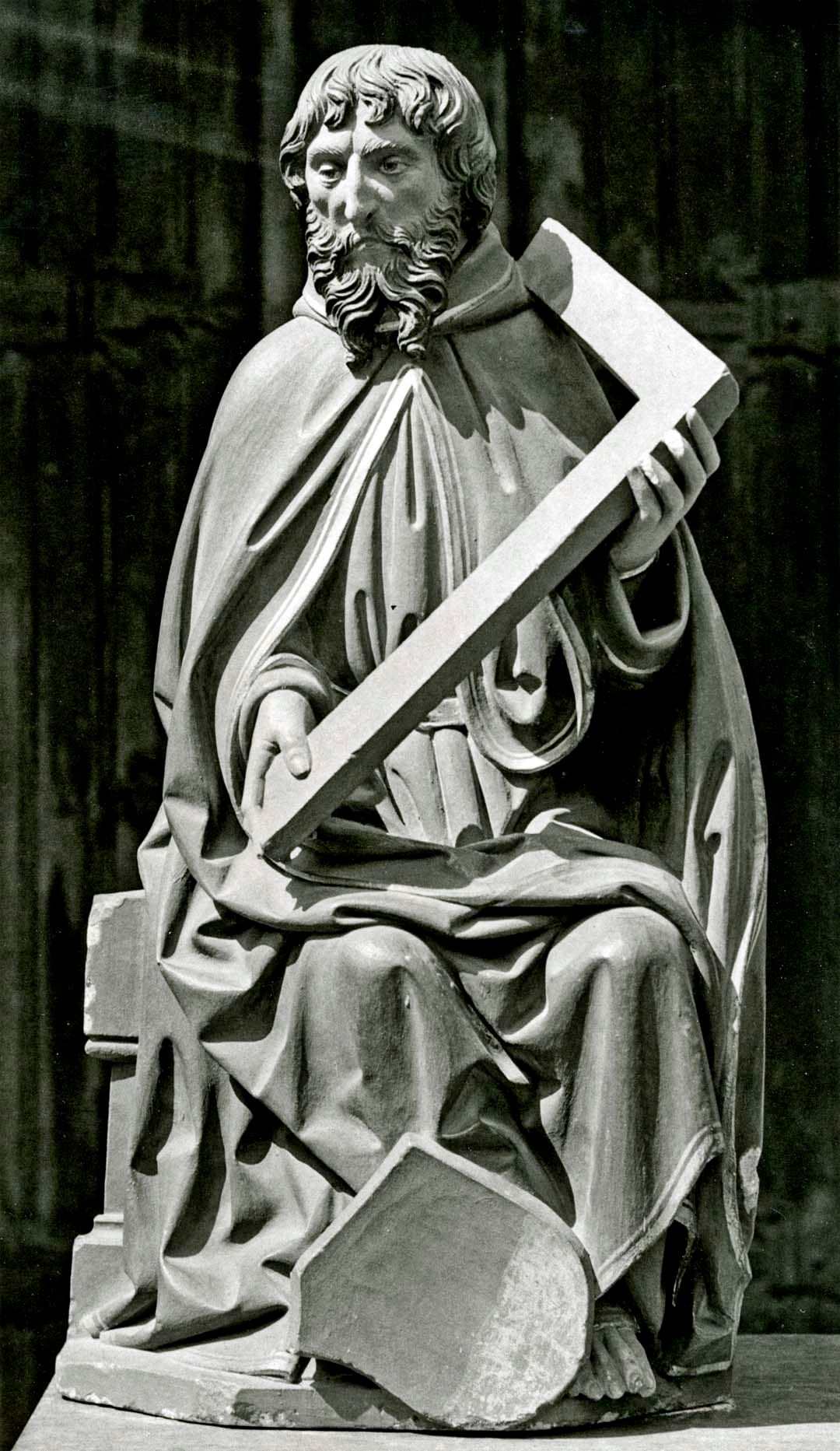
Heinrich Brabender, Saint Thomas, c. 1500, St. Dionysius Church, Rheine, Germany

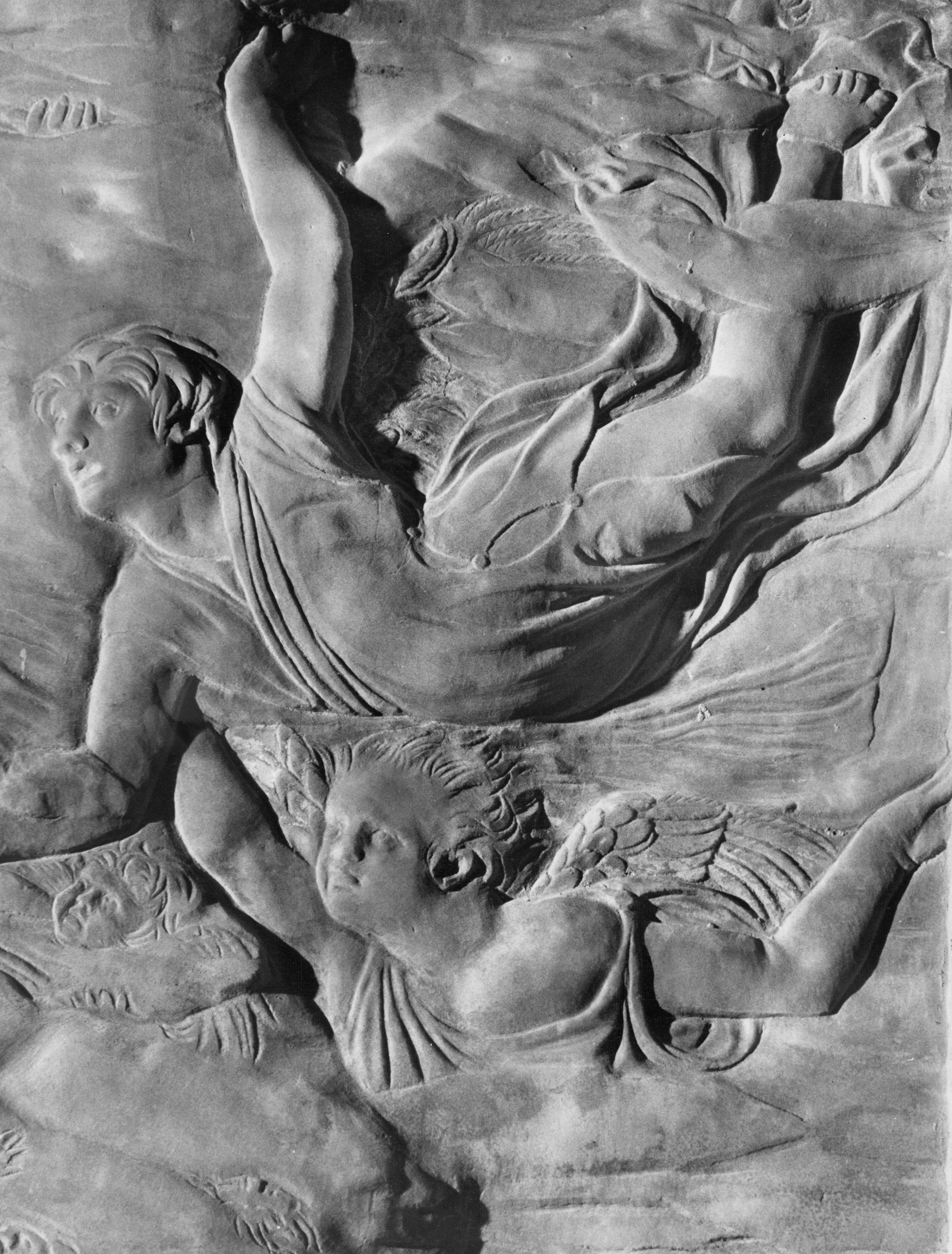
Donatello, detail of Assumption of the Virgin, c. 1427–1428

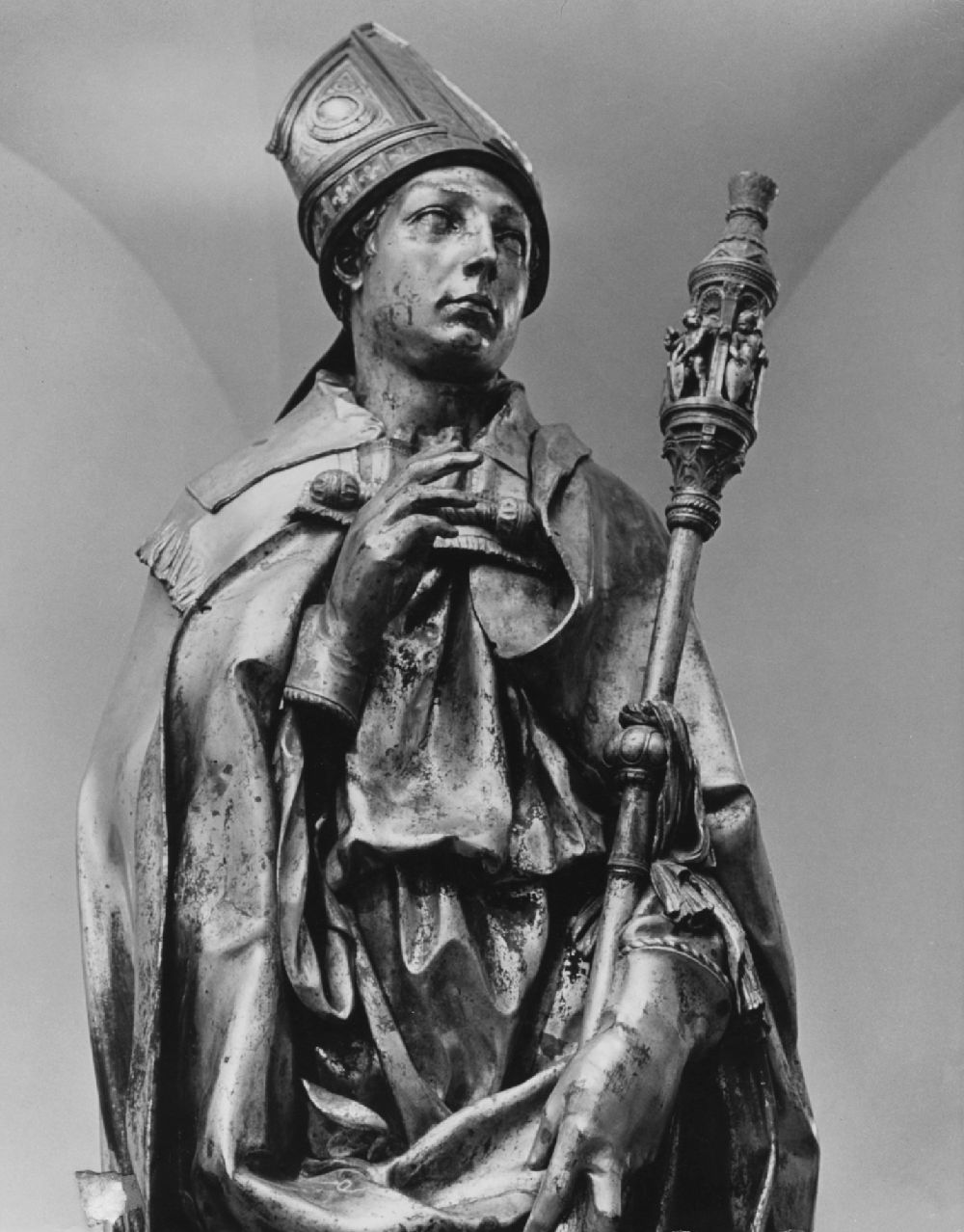
Donatello, Saint Louis of Toulouse, 1423–1425, Museo dell'Opera di Santa Croce, Florence

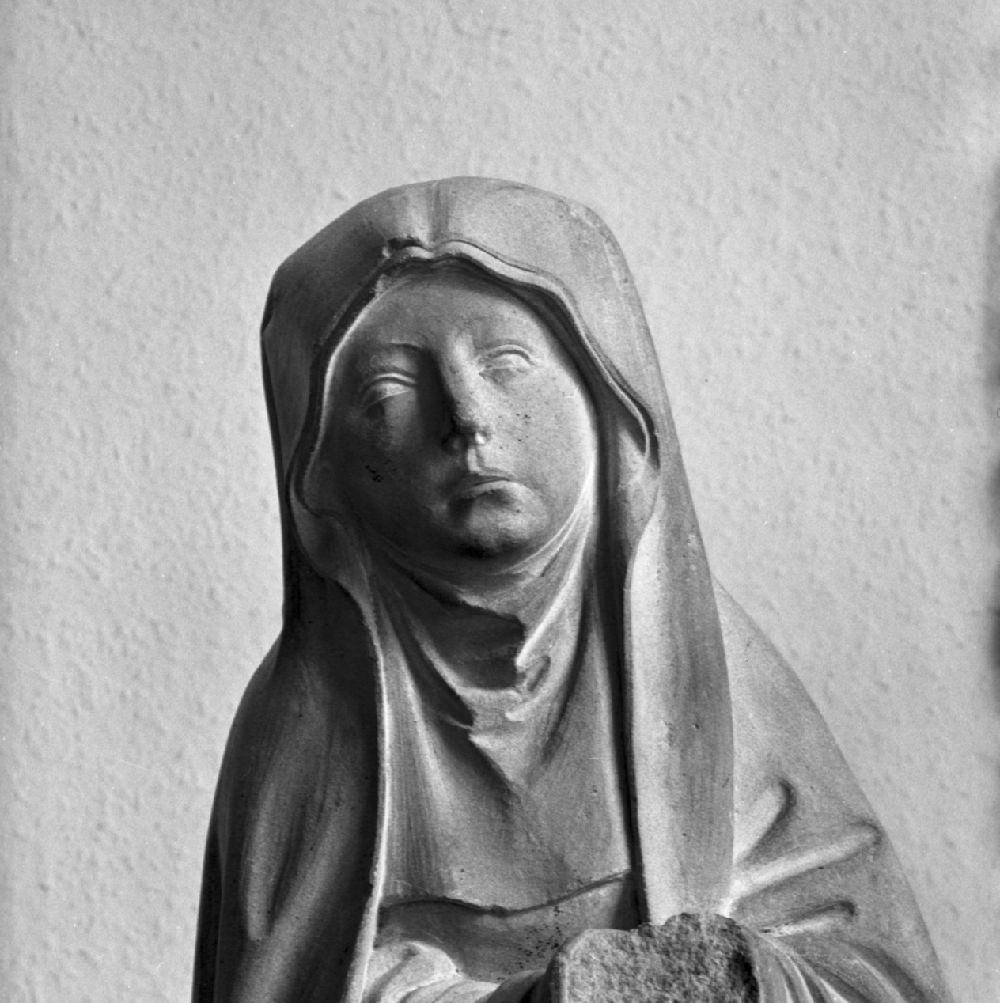
Heinrich Brabender, detail of Mary, the Blessed Virgin, c.1500, Falkenhof Museum

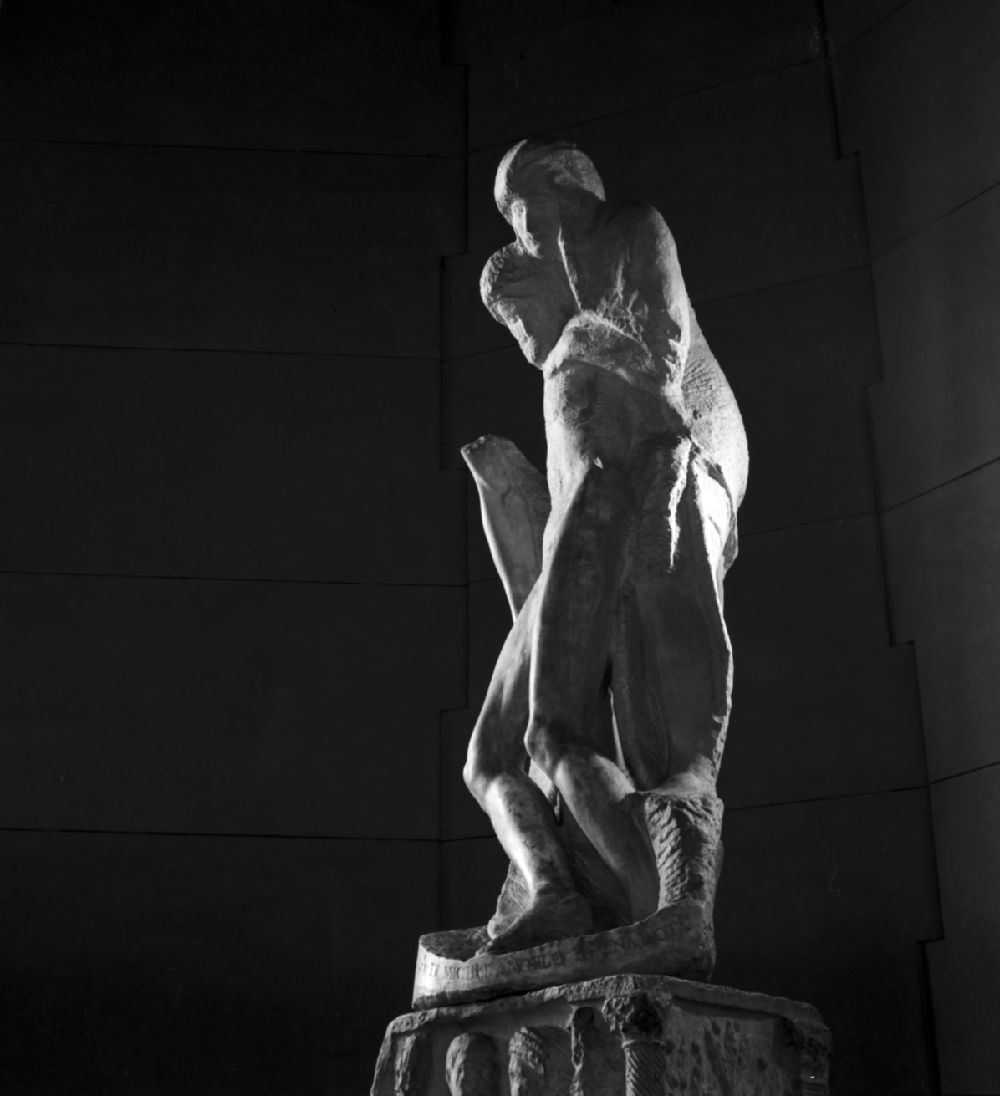
Michelangelo, Rondanini Pieta, 1564

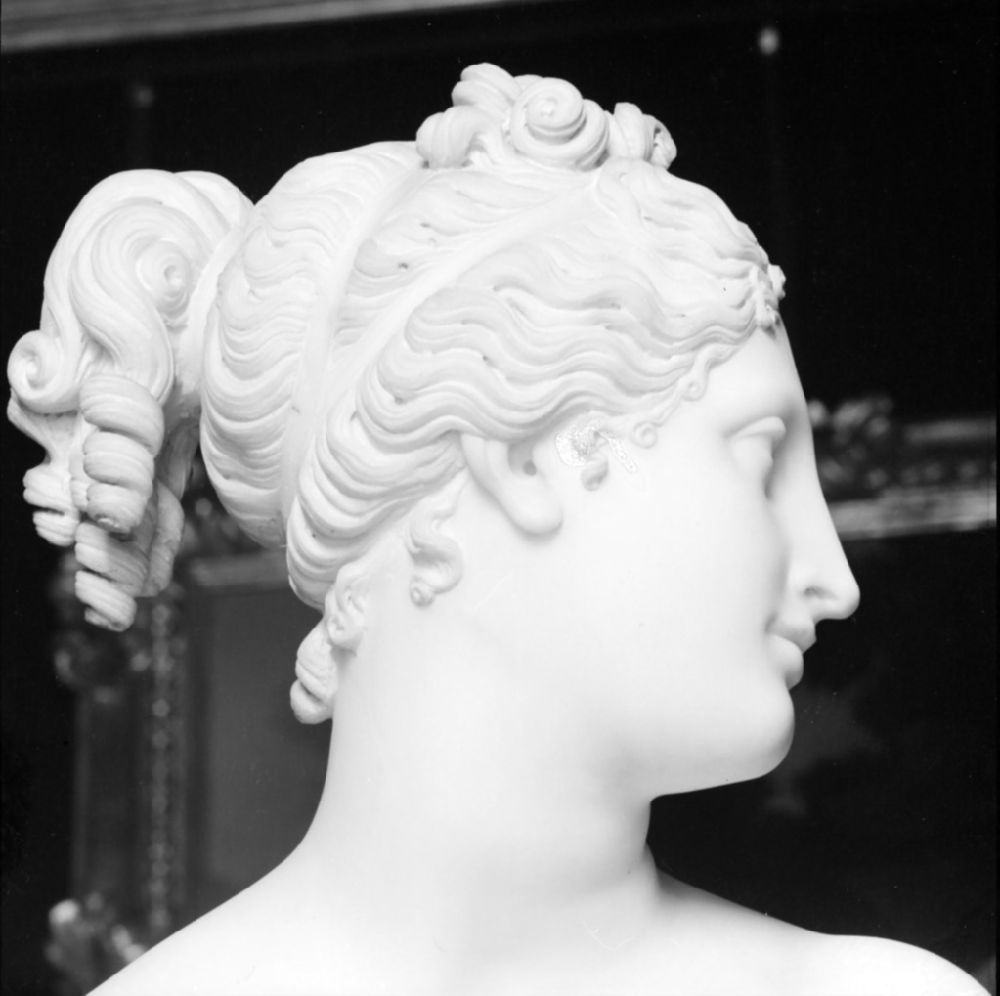
Antonio Canova, detail of Venus Italica, 1804–1812

== Selected bibliography ==
- Hartt, Frederick. Michelangelo's three pietàs: photographic study. With photography by David Finn. New York: H. N. Abrams, 1975. ISBN 9780810903401
- Finn, David. Henry Moore: sculpture and environment. With photography by David Finn, foreword by Kenneth Clark and commentaries by Henry Moore. New York: H. N. Abrams, 1976.
- Clark, Kenneth. The Florence Baptistry Doors. With photography by David Finn. New York: A Studio Book from Viking Press, 1980. ISBN 9780670319978
- Pieper, Paul. Heinrich Brabender: Ein Bildhauer der Spätgotik in Münster. With photography by David Finn and an introduction by Henry Moore. Münster: Coppenrath, 1984. ISBN 9783885472384
- Wilkinson, Burke. Uncommon clay: the life and works of Augustus Saint Gaudens. With photography by David Finn. San Diego: Harcourt Brace Jovanovich. 1985. ISBN 9780151927494
- Finn, David. How to Look at Sculpture. With photography by David Finn. New York: Abrams, 1989. ISBN 9780810924123
- Finn, David. How to Visit a Museum. With photography by David Finn. New York: Abrams, 1985. ISBN 9780810922976
- McCue, George. Sculpture City, St. Louis: public sculpture in the "Gateway to the West." With photography by David Finn and Amy Binder. New York: Hudson Hills Press, 1988. ISBN 9780933920620
- Morand, Kathleen. Claus Sluter, artist at the Court of Burgundy. With photography by David Finn. Austin: University of Texas Press, 1991. ISBN 9780292711174
- Reynolds, Donald Martin. Masters of American sculpture: the figurative tradition from the American renaissance to the millennium. With photography by David Finn. New York: Abbeville Press, 1993. ISBN 9781558592766
- Finn, David. How to Look at Photographs. With photography by David Finn. New York: Abrams, 1994. ISBN 9780810925533
- Avery, Charles. Bernini: Genius of the Baroque. With photography by David Finn. Boston: Little, Brown and Company, 1997. ISBN 9780821224656
- Chillida, Eduardo, Giovanni Carandente and Dena Merriam. Eduardo Chillida. With photography by David Finn and translations by Richard Lewis-Rees. Cologne, Germany: Könemann, 1999. ISBN 9783829034005
- Finn, David. How to Look at Everything. With photography by David Finn. New York: Abrams, 2000. ISBN 9780810927261
- Finn, David. 20th-century American sculpture in the White House garden. With photography by David Finn, a foreword by Hillary Rodham Clinton, and an essay by Betty C. Monkman. New York: Abrams, 2000. ISBN 9780810942219
- Finn, David, and Susan Joy Slack. Sculpture at the Corcoran. With photography by David Finn, and foreword by David C. Levy. New York: Ruder-Finn Press, 2002. ISBN 9780972011914
- Moskowitz, Anita Fiderer. The façade reliefs of Orvieto Cathedral. With photography by David Finn. London: Harvey Miller, 2009. ISBN 9781905375271
