= Zack Kass =

American author

- Born: Santa Barbara, California, U.S.
- Education: University of California, Berkeley (BA)
- Occupations: Business executive, writer
- Known for: Head of Go-To-Market at OpenAI
- Website: zackkass.com

Zack Kass is an American business executive and writer in the field of artificial intelligence. He is the former head of go-to-market for OpenAI where he developed the sales, solutions, and partnerships teams for the launch of ChatGPT. Kass is also the author of The Next RenAIssance: AI and the Expansion of Human Potential which appeared on the USA Today bestseller list in 2026. He is also the AI for Conservation Fellow at Conservation International.

== Early life and education ==
Kass grew up in Santa Barbara, California and attended San Marcos High School. He went on to earn a Bachelor of Arts from the University of California, Berkeley.

== Career ==
Kass joined the machine learning company CrowdFlower after graduating from Berkeley. In 2021, Kass joined OpenAI as its Head of Go-To-Market. He built the company's sales, solutions, and partnerships teams prior to the launch of ChatGPT.

After departing OpenAI in 2023, Kass established an independent advisory practice focused on AI strategy. He advises companies such as Coca-Cola, Samsung, and Morgan Stanley on artificial intelligence. In 2024, he was named chair of the global AI advisory council at Ruder Finn, a role PRWeek recognized in naming him to its AI 25: Class of 2026 list. That same year he joined the University of Virginia's McIntire School of Commerce as Executive-in-Residence. He also collaborates with Hong Kong University of Science and Technology on research into the future of work and serves as the AI for Conservation Fellow at Conservation International.

In 2021, Kass co-authored a paper titled Unmetered Intelligence, which argued that artificial intelligence would become increasingly abundant and inexpensive, similar to utilities such as electricity or bandwidth. His 2026 book The Next RenAIssance: AI and the Expansion of Human Potential expands on several themes introduced in the paper. It appeared on the USA Today bestseller list in 2026. Kass has also described an "automation boundary," referring to the line between tasks societies are willing to automate and those they prefer to keep human.
