= Barnet & Reef Associates =

American public relations firm

- Industry: Public relations
- Founded: 1958
- Founder: Sylvan M. Barnet Jr. Arthur Reef
- Fate: Merged with Ruder Finn
- Headquarters: New York City

Barnet & Reef Associates was a public relations firm based in New York City, founded in 1958 by Sylvan M. Barnet Jr. and Arthur Reef. Known for creating an international public relations network entitled PR International, which was essentially Barnet & Reef's operating organization abroad, Barnet & Reef worked in the international market until it merged with Harshe-Rotman & Druck in 1964. After a series of mergers in the 1980s, it became part of what is now Ruder Finn.

== History ==
Barnet & Reef, founded in 1958 by Sylvan M. Barnet Jr. and Arthur Reef, was one of the first agencies to deliver public relations programming internationally. Prior to creating their firm, Reef held positions in Latin America, the Far East, and Europe, including Germany during the late 1940s and early 1950s. Barnet was the manager of an international newspaper in Paris, the manager of the European Edition of the New York Herald Tribune, and the head of Tribune's syndicate and news service in New York. Their first-hand experiences of the fallout of WWII, along with the effects of the Marshall Plan, and the rise of the Iron Curtain in Europe, pushed Reef and Barnet into the world of international public relations and spurred the creation of Barnet & Reef.

The firm opened with a staff of fifteen people in 1959. During its prime in the early 1960s, Barnet & Reef had associates in 48 different countries. Realizing that creating Barnet & Reef offices in each of the regions would be expensive and impractical, Barnet and Reef created a network called PR International of over 40 personnel worldwide.

Barnet & Reef merged with Harshe-Rotman & Druck in 1964. In 1982, Harshe-Rotman & Druck merged with Ruder & Finn, a firm which now operates as Ruder Finn.

=== Arthur Reef ===
Arthur (Art) Reef (September 21, 1916 – January 17, 2008) of New York City, was the son of Herman Reef and Eva Reef. Reef is predominantly known as one of the co-founders of Barnet & Reef. Prior to establishing his own public relations firm, Reef worked for Ruder & Finn from 1955 to 1957. At the time Ruder & Finn was a small public relations firm based out of New York. After working at Ruder & Finn, Reef founded Barnet & Reef with Barnet. The two lead Barnet & Reef from 1957 to 1964. In 1964, Barnet & Reef merged with Harshe-Rotman & Druck. After the merger, Reef took an offer from American Metal Climax (now known as AMAX).

AMAX did not have any established public relations or communication related departments. Reef worked to create these departments and give them full access to the CEO and decent financial backing. Reef worked under three CEOs of AMAX before returning to consulting for international public relations. In 1994, Reef retired to Florida.

=== Sylvan Barnet ===
Sylvan (Barney) Barnet Jr. (August 5, 1919 – January 7, 2015) is best known for co-founding Barnet & Reef with Arthur Reef. He spent his life working in international communications including publishing, public relations, advertising, and government. Before his time at Barnet & Reef, Barnet held a position as the General Manager of the European Edition of The New York Herald Tribune in Paris. Barnet then partnered with Reef to lead Barnet & Reef from 1957 to 1964.

In 1964, Barnet & Reef merged with Harshe-Rotman & Druck. Barnet went to work for the government after Barnet & Reef merged. He joined the Department of Commerce as Deputy Director of the US Travel Service to promote both international tourism and business development in the US and in 1968 became the vice president of public relations and area development at American Airlines. Additionally, Barnet served as deputy executive director of the International Advertising Association before becoming a representative to the United Nations and vice chairman of Rotary International, where he served as chair of The NGO executive committee, and a member of the NGO committees on sustainable development, and population and development.

=== Notable works ===
Some of Barnet & Reef's most notable accounts included Dow Chemical and Merck, Sharpe & Dohme International, AMF International, Burlington Hosiery, Goodyear, John Deere, United Fruit, the International Advertising Association, and the U.S. Aid’s Indian Investment Centre. Their first ever assignment was for AMF International where they helped open bowling lanes in London. While working for their client, Barnet & Reef invited everest mountaineer, Edmund Hillary, to throw the first bowling ball.

Another notable account was the newly independent Eastern Nigeria. The IAA contacted Barnet & Reef and they met up with Nigerian chiefs to sign a contract. Barnet & Reef described this account as “the best account ever with fees paid in dollars each year in advance by Barclay’s.”

=== Legacy ===
Barnet and Reef were awarded the Atlas Awards for Lifetime Achievement in 2004 for their work with the firm and in the creation of PR International. After Barnet & Reef merged, their work continued as Harshe-Rotman & Druck.
