= Akanu Ibiam =

Nigerian medical doctor and politician (1906–1995)

Sir Francis Akanu Ibiam KCMG KBE
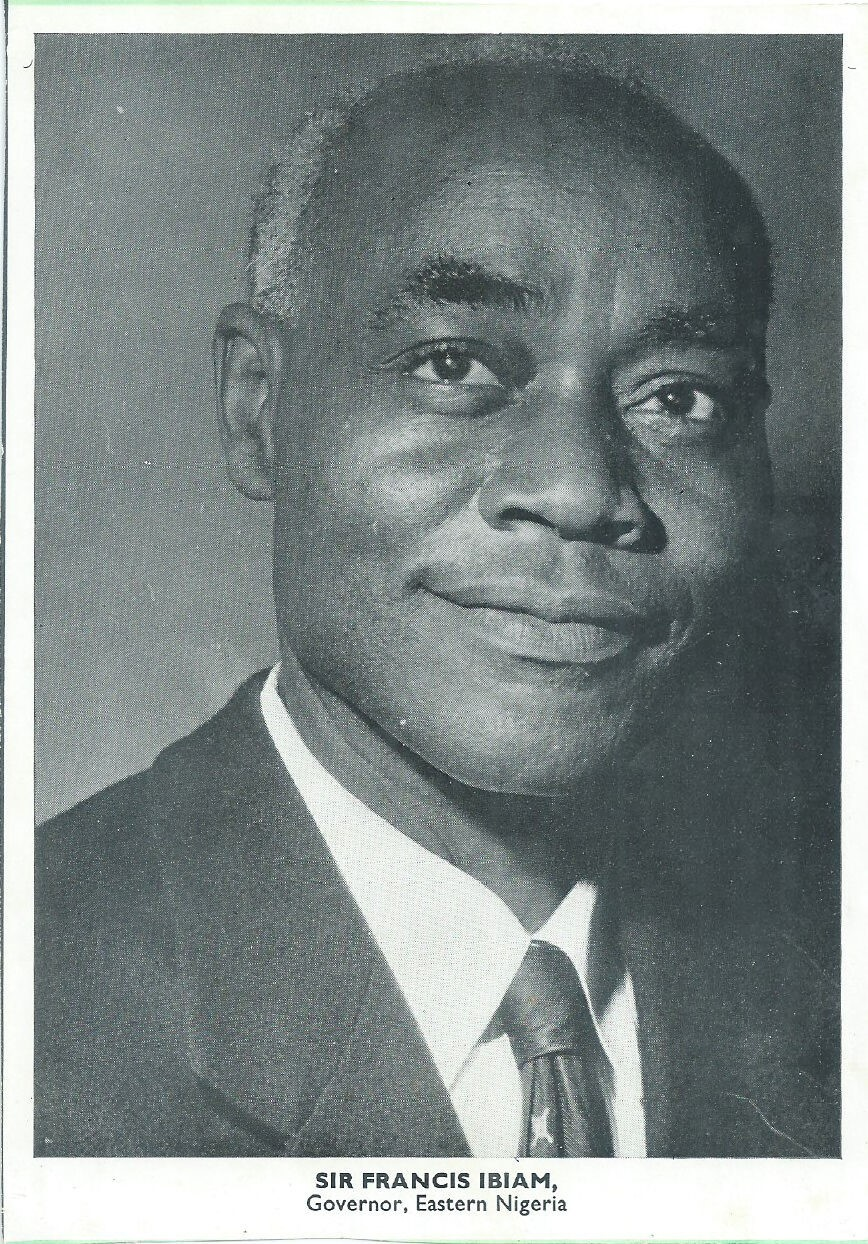

Governor of Eastern Region, Nigeria
- In office 15 December 1960 – 16 January 1966
- Preceded by: Sir Robert Stapledon
- Succeeded by: Chukwuemeka Odumegwu Ojukwu

Personal details
- Born: 29 November 1906 Unwana, Afikpo North, Ebonyi State, Southern Nigeria Protectorate (now Nigeria)
- Died: 1 July 1995 (aged 88)

Sir Akanu Ibiam KCMG KBE (29 November 1906 - 1 July 1995), was a distinguished medical missionary who was appointed Governor of Eastern Region, Nigeria from December 1960 until January 1966 during the Nigerian First Republic. From 1919 to 1951, he was known as Francis Ibiam, and from 1951 to 1967, Sir Francis Ibiam. After this time, he dropped his title and his forename and was known as simply Akanu Ibiam although the honours he reportedly returned were not annulled by the British government.

== Early years ==
Ibiam was born in Unwana, Afikpo, Ebonyi State on 29 November 1906, of Igbo background. He was the second son of Chief Ibiam, a native of Unwana. His father later became a traditional ruler, Eze Ogo Isiala I of Unwana and Osuji of Uburu, in the Nigerian chieftaincy system. He attended Hope Waddell Training Institute, Calabar, and King's College, Lagos, and then was admitted to the University of St. Andrews, graduating with a medical degree in 1934. He was accepted as a medical missionary of the Church of Scotland, in which role he established Abiriba hospital (1936–1945) and later superintended mission hospitals at Itu and Uburu.

Ibiam was never ordained as a minister, but he was elected and ordained as an elder of the Presbyterian Church. He was appointed an honorary officer of the Order of the British Empire (OBE) in the 1949 New Year Honours for his work as a medical missionary of the Church of Scotland, and was appointed an honorary Knight Commander of the Order of the British Empire (KBE) in the 1951 New Year Honours, which was later made substantive. Ibiam was president of the Christian Council of Nigeria (1955–1958). In 1957 he was appointed principal of Hope Waddell Institution. In 1959 Ibiam was president of the University College of Ibadan. On a visit to Northern Rhodesia, he was refused service at a café reserved for whites, an affair that became notorious. In 1962, he was chairman of the committee that established the Protestant Chapel at the University of Nigeria, Nsukka Campus.

In the lead-up to Nigerian independence Ibiam served in local government, in the Eastern Regional House of Assembly, and in the Legislative and Executive Councils.

After Nigeria gained independence in 1960, Ibiam was appointed governor of Eastern Region. On 24 August 1962, he was appointed a Knight Commander of the Order of St. Michael and St. George (KCMG). Ibiam held office until the military coup of 15 January 1966 that brought Major General Johnson Aguiyi-Ironsi to power. His successor, colonel Emeka Ojukwu, immediately ejected Ibiam from the State House in Enugu. Later, Emeka became president of the breakaway state of Biafra.

== Nigerian Civil War ==
During the Nigerian Civil War of 1967–1970, Ibiam actively assisted the Biafrans, helping obtain relief supplies through his church contacts. As one of the six presidents of the World Council of Churches (WCC), Ibiam spoke at the WCC Meeting in Uppsala, Sweden, in July 1968 where the problem of relief for refugees was discussed.

Chief Bola Ige, Adviser to the Church of the Province of West Africa was also present, and ensured that the name "Biafra" was avoided in the WCC resolution, since that would imply recognition of the state. However, Ibiam was instrumental in ensuring that the nightly air lift of relief into Biafra was started.

In 1969, he travelled across Canada to raise humanitarian aid and support for the people of Biafra. Ibiam returned his knighthood and renounced his English name, Francis, in protest against the British government's support of the Nigerian federal government.

== Later years ==
Following the war, Ibiam continued work on reconstruction and hospital service. Ibiam was responsible for the Bible Society of Nigeria and the Christian Medical Fellowship. He became a president of the All Africa Conference of Churches.

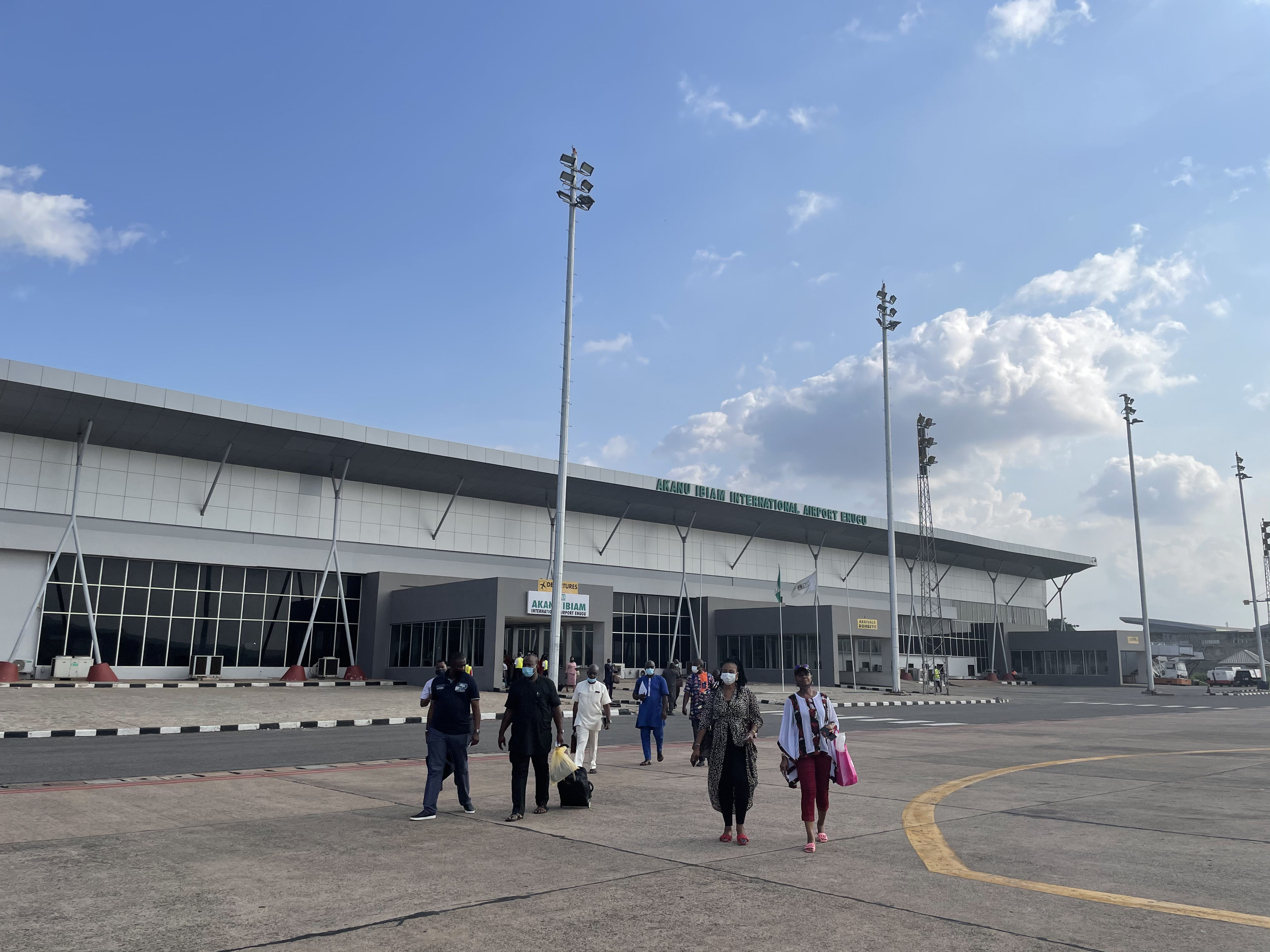
Akanu Ibiam International Airport

Ibiam died on 1 July 1995. More than 20,000 people attended his funeral in Unwana. The Akanu Ibiam International Airport, Enugu, the Akanu Ibiam Federal Polytechnic, Unwana, Ebonyi State, and the Francis Akanu Ibiam Stadium University of Nigeria, Nsukka are named after him.

== See also ==
- List of Igbo people
- List of people from Ebonyi State

Region	Period	Governor	Premier	Notes
Eastern Region	Oct 1960 - Jan 1966	Francis Akanu Ibiam	Michael Okpara	
Mid-Western Region	Aug 1963 - Feb 1964	Dennis Osadebay	Dennis Osadebay (Administrator)	Region created from part of Western Region on 8 August 1963
Mid-Western Region	Feb 1964 - Jan 1966	Jereton Mariere	Dennis Osadebay	
Northern Region	Oct 1960 - 1962	Gawain Westray Bell	Ahmadu Bello	
Northern Region	1962 - Jan 1966	Kashim Ibrahim	Ahmadu Bello	
Western Region	Oct 1960 - May 1962	Adesoji Aderemi	Samuel Ladoke Akintola	
Western Region	May 1962 - Dec 1962	Adesoji Aderemi	Moses Majekodunmi (Administrator)	Administrator appointed during political crisis
Western Region	Jan 1963 - Jan 1966	Joseph Fadahunsi	Samuel Akintola	
