= List of governors of Eastern Region, Nigeria =

This is a list of governors of Eastern Region, Nigeria. Eastern Region was one of Nigeria's federal divisions, dating back originally from the division of the colony Southern Nigeria in 1954. The region was divided in 1967 into three new states, East-Central State, Rivers State and South-Eastern State.

Eastern Region Governor	Title	Took office	Left office	Notes
Sir Clement John Pleass	Governor	1 October 1954	November 1956	
Sir Robert Stapledon	Governor	November 1956	May 1960	
Sir Francis Akanu Ibiam	Governor	15 December 1960	16 January 1966	
Lt. Colonel Chukwuemeka Odumegwu Ojukwu	Governor	19 January 1966	27 May 1967	(Military)

== See also ==
- Nigeria
- States of Nigeria
- List of state governors of Nigeria
