= 1964 Mid-West Region legislative election =

Legislative elections were held in the Mid-West Region in Nigeria in February 1964. The result was a victory for the National Council of Nigerian Citizens, which won 53 of the 68 seats.

== Results ==
Party	Seats
National Council of Nigerian Citizens	53
Mid-West Democratic Front	11
Independents	4
Total	68
