= Kyodo Public Relations =

Kyodo Public Relations Co., Ltd.
- Type: Public (JASDAQ: 2436)
- Industry: Public Relations
- Founded: Tokyo, Japan (November 1964)
- Founder: Sakae Ohashi
- Headquarters: Ginza, Tokyo, Japan
- Key people: Tetsuya Tani (president)
- Number of employees: 243 (December 2021)
- Website: https://kyodo-pr.com

Kyodo Public Relations or Kyodo PR is the largest independent public relations agency in Japan. It provides service mainly for enterprises. It was founded in 1964 by Sakae Ohashi and listed on stock market of JASDAQ in 2005.

In 2021, Kyodo PR was ranked 46th on the Global Top 250 PR Agency Ranking.

== Location ==
Kyodo PR is located in Ginza, in the center of Tokyo.
