= 1960 Western Region legislative election =

Legislative elections were held in Western Region in Nigeria in July 1960. The result was a victory for Action Group, which won 79 of the 122 seats.

== Results ==
Party	Seats
Action Group	79
NCNC–NEPU	33
Mabolaje Grand Alliance	10
Total	122
Source: Sternberger et al.Sternberger et al.
