= Sculpture Review =

- Cover of the winter 1998 edition
- Managing Editor: Daniel Gutierrez-Sandoval
- Categories: Sculpture, Figurative art, Art history, Archeology
- Frequency: Quarterly
- First issue: December 1951
- Company: National Sculpture Society
- Country: USA
- Language: English
- Website: journals.sagepub.com/home/srx
- ISSN: 0028-0127

Sculpture Review is the official illustrated publication of the National Sculpture Society (NSS). It is concerned with figurative sculpture. It features articles about the history of figurative sculpture and sculptors as well as current artists and trends. Sculpture Review is now published by SAGE Publishing.

It began being published as National Sculpture Review in 1951 and is published on a quarterly basis. The name was changed from National Sculpture Review to Sculpture Review in the 1980s.

Publication ended with the Winter 2023 issue. In 2024, The National Sculpture Society started publishing Sculpture Quarterly.
