= 1961 Eastern Region legislative election =

Legislative elections were held in the Eastern Region of Nigeria on 16 November 1961.

== Results ==
Party	Seats
National Council of Nigerian Citizens	106
Action Group	15
Dynamic Party	5
Independents	20
Total	146
Source: Sternberger et al.
