= Clement John Pleass =

British colonial official

Sir Clement John Pleass (1901—1988) was a British colonial official who served as the Governor of Eastern Region from 1954 to 1956. Pleass joined the Colonial Administrative Service in 1924 and was appointed the Lieutenant governor of the Eastern Region from 1952 to 1954 and the Governor from 1954 to 1956.
