= Michael Okpara =

Nigerian politician (1920–1984)

Michael Iheonukara Okpara

Premier of Eastern Nigeria
- In office 1 October 1959 – 15 January 1966
- Preceded by: Nnamdi Azikiwe
- Succeeded by: Position abolished

Personal details
- Born: 25 December 1920 Umuahia, Southern Region, British Nigeria
- Died: 17 December 1984 (aged 63)
- Party: National Council of Nigeria and the Cameroons
- Spouse: Adanma Enyidiya Okpara
- Children: Nnawuihe Okpara, Uzodinma Okpara, Chinyere Okpara, Enyinna Okpara, Ugonwa Okpara, Ijeoma Okpara
- Profession: Medical Doctor, Politician

Michael Iheonukara Okpara // (25 December 1920 – 17 December 1984) was a Nigerian politician and Premier of Eastern Nigeria during the First Republic, from 1959 to 1966. At 39, he was the nation's youngest premier. He was a strong advocate of what he called "pragmatic socialism" and believed that agricultural reform was crucial to the ultimate success of Nigeria.

Region	Period	Governor	Premier	Notes
Eastern Region	Oct 1960 - Jan 1966	Francis Akanu Ibiam	Michael Okpara	
Mid-Western Region	Aug 1963 - Feb 1964	Dennis Osadebay	Dennis Osadebay (Administrator)	Region created from part of Western Region on 8 August 1963
Mid-Western Region	Feb 1964 - Jan 1966	Jereton Mariere	Dennis Osadebay	
Northern Region	Oct 1960 - 1962	Gawain Westray Bell	Ahmadu Bello	
Northern Region	1962 - Jan 1966	Kashim Ibrahim	Ahmadu Bello	
Western Region	Oct 1960 - May 1962	Adesoji Aderemi	Samuel Ladoke Akintola	
Western Region	May 1962 - Dec 1962	Adesoji Aderemi	Moses Majekodunmi (Administrator)	Administrator appointed during political crisis
Western Region	Jan 1963 - Jan 1966	Joseph Fadahunsi	Samuel Akintola	
