= Effiong Okon Eyo =

Nigerian politician (1918–1983)

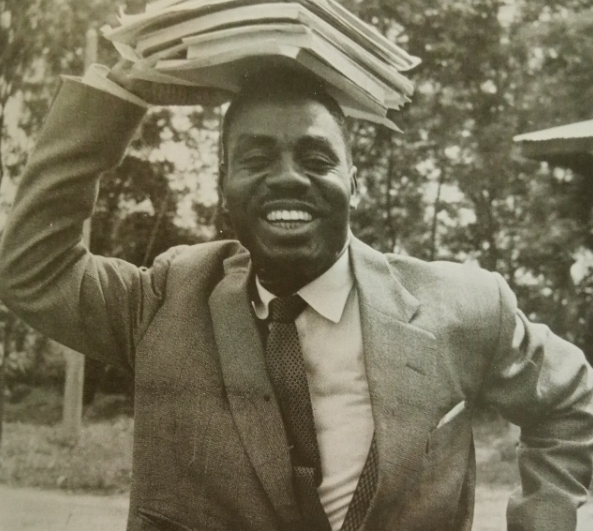
(1959)

Effiong Okon Eyo (1918–1983) was a Nigerian politician who was a former Deputy Speaker of the House of Assembly, Eastern region of Nigeria. Eyo was originally a member of NCNC but after a fallout with party leader, Azikiwe, he joined the opposition. Thereafter, he was involved in a petition to probe of the affairs of African Continental Bank and the bank's relationship with the regional government in 1956.

== Life ==
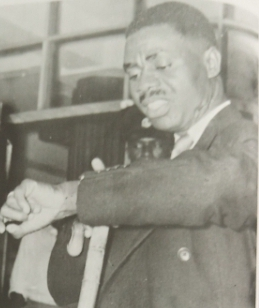

Eyo, popularly known as Eyo Uyo, was born in Ibesikpo area of Uyo. He attended Government College Umuahia(Ref); after stepping out of Umuahia, he then took on various duties including working as a school teacher (where, which school, who were his students?), trader and clerk. In 1949, he calined ownership to a scholarship program organized and funded by the Ibesikpo community. The scholarship was planned to send 100 students from the community to secondary school and four students in tertiary institutions, it was funded by the April palm produce of community members. When representative democracy began in 1951, Eyo won the election to represent Uyo at the Eastern regional House of Assembly, following his victory and through an electoral college system, he was selected as a member of the House of Representatives between 1953 and 1954. In 1953, there was a crisis in the House of Assembly which led to the resignation of the premier, Eyo Ita and call for new mandates. Nnamdi Azikiwe, the leader of opposition in the Western region, moved to the east where he contested and won election in Onitsha, his hometown. Azikiwe became the new premier with support of legislators including Eyo who was appointed Chief Whip and chairman of the Eastern Region Development Company. Towards the end of 1956, Eyo and Azikiwe had a fallout, Eyo then petitioned the colonial government to probe the role of the premier in the affairs of a private bank. Eyo warn the case against Azikiwe and the crown court in England declared that Azikiwe has run short of honesty and the UBA bank was taken and handed over to the eastern Nigerian government.

When a fresh election was called, Eyo joined the Action Group and was elected, he was now as a member of the opposition with a primary focus on the creation of a Calabar, Ogoja and Rivers (COR) State.

When a Southeastern State was created, Eyo was a commissioner under the military administration of Esuene. In 1977, he was a councilor representing Uyo and later joined Great Nigeria People's Party during the Second Nigerian Republic. He was the second president of the Ibibio Union, after Ekong Etuk. He was awarded Obong Ikpaisong Ibibio ye Anang by the traditional rulers of Ibibio and Anang thereby making him the highest traditional title holder in what is currently Akwa Ibom State. When Effion Okon Eyo was accused of masterminding the killing of his political opponents during the Nigerian civil war, He was summoned by the chiefs in 1982 to the Lutheran High School Hall, Obot Idim, Uyo. He requested to go public with what he knows about the killings during the Nigerian civil war but was opposed by the chiefs. E.O.Eyo then compiled and presented a pamphlet titled 'WHO KILLED WHO' which he chronicled letters of complaints from traditional chiefs from various divisions against various players in the war in their localities to Col. Adekunle who led the Nigerian army to liberate the mainland south eastern state which is the current Akwa Ibom State and copies of those complaints were forwarded to Eyo as a first class chief. The chiefs then forbade him from publishing the document to prevent further escalation with the assumption that, attributing the killings to Eyo alone would be better than exposing the chiefs who masterminded the killings to the relations of the dead. Lack of this vital information has led to age long misinformation and claims that he single-handedly killed all his political opponents in Ibibio and Anang before 1975. This is the same Effiong Okon Eyo who championed the creation of Akwa Ibom State and gave the state the name of the state at Oron stadium during the launching of Akwa Ibom State movement and all successive governments in the state has refused to honour or immortalize him.
