= Robert Stapledon =

British colonial administrator

Sir Robert de Stapeldon Stapledon, KCMG, CBE (6 February 1909 – 30 August 1975) was a British colonial administrator and Governor of the Bahamas from 1960 to 1964.

== Biography ==
Stapledon was born in Bideford, Devon, the third and youngest son of Mr & Mrs. Ernest A. Stapledon. He first served as a cadet in the colonial service in Nigeria in 1931. In 1933, Stapledon married Marjorie W. Radford in Northam, Devon. In 1934, he was appointed an Assistant District Officer in Nigeria. Between 1940 and 1944, he served in West Africa followed by a two-year stint in the Pacific Islands.

Stapledon was made the Chief Secretary of Tanganyika from 1954 to 1956, before serving as the Governor of Eastern Region, Nigeria from 1956 to 1960. He served as Governor of the Bahamas from 1960 to 1964. He was then appointed to be a Member of the Commonwealth Development Corporation from 1964 to 1967.

Stapledon was made an Officer of the Order of the British Empire (OBE) in 1944 and a Commander of the Order (CBE) in 1953. In 1955, he was appointed a Companion of the Order of St Michael and St George and, in 1956, a Knight Commander (K.C.M.G.). In 1959, Stapledon was appointed a Knight of the Order of the Hospital of St. John of Jerusalem.

Stapledon died at the Old Rectory in Littleham, Devon on 30 August 1975; he was 66.
