= Military coups in Nigeria =

Aspect of Nigerian politics

Since Nigeria became independent in 1960, there have been five military coups. Between 1966 and 1999, Nigeria was ruled by a military government without interruption, apart from a short-lived return to democracy under the Second Republic of 1979 to 1983. However, the most recent coup occurred in 1993, and there have been no significant further attempts under the Fourth Republic, which restored multi-party democracy in 1999.

== List of coups and coup attempts ==
=== January 1966 coup ===
On 15 January 1966, a group of young military officers overthrew Nigeria's government, ending the short-lived First Nigerian Republic. The officers who staged the coup were mostly young soldiers, led by Kaduna Nzeogwu, and they assassinated several northerners, including Prime Minister Tafawa Balewa, Northern Region Premier Ahmadu Bello, Western Region Premier Ladoke Akintola, finance minister Festus Okotie-Eboh, and the four highest-ranking northern military officers. The coup leaders publicly pledged to eliminate corruption, suppress violence, and hold new elections. Major General Johnson Aguiyi Ironsi, also an Igbo but not party to the original conspiracy, intervened to impose discipline on the military and became head of state. He suspended the constitution, dissolved all legislative parties, banned political parties, and formed an interim federal military government, though without specifying the date on which civilian rule would be restored.

=== July 1966 counter-coup ===
On 29 July 1966, a counter-coup commenced, and Ironsi's regime had fallen by 1 August. Lieutenant Colonel Yakubu Gowon became head of state. Ironsi and the governor of the Western Region, Lieutenant Colonel Francis Adekunle Fajuyi, were among the casualties. Muhammadu Buhari, who was himself installed as head of state in the 1983 coup, was one of the officers involved. Both the coups and the counter-coup assumed an "ethnic colouration" and they fuelled ethnic violence, contributing to events which ultimately led to the Nigerian civil war. After the end of the war, in October 1970, Gowon reiterated an earlier pledge to ensure that military rule would be terminated on 1 October 1976. In 1974, however, he postponed democratisation, explaining that Nigerians had not yet demonstrated "moderation and self-control in pursuing sectional ends".

=== 1975 coup ===
On 29 July 1975, Colonel Joseph Nanven Garba, a close friend of Gowon's, announced on Radio Nigeria that he and other officers had decided to remove Gowon as head of state and commander-in-chief. The coup was bloodless: Gowon was abroad, attending a meeting of the Organisation of African Unity in Kampala. He was replaced by Brigadier Murtala Muhammed, with Brigadier Olusegun Obasanjo installed as deputy head of state. The New York Times reported that General Hassan Katsina, a former Chief of Army Staff who had been demoted by Gowon, was said to be "the real author of the coup". On 1 October, Muhammed, like Gowon, pledged a return to civilian rule: following the drafting of a new constitution and various institutional changes, elections would be held, allowing for a transfer of power on 1 October 1979.

=== 1976 coup attempt ===
On 13 February 1976, Muhammed was assassinated at the outset of an abortive coup attempt. His driver and aide were also killed; as was Ibrahim Taiwo, the military governor of Kwara state. The coup was led by a group of officers who called themselves "young revolutionaries" in a radio broadcast; however, they lacked both civilian and military support. The coup was denounced by division commanders and government leaders outside Lagos and was quickly suppressed. Obasanjo became head of state. The Nigerian government reported that the coup had been led by Lieutenant Colonel Bukar Suka Dimka and had aimed at restoring Gowon's regime. 125 people were arrested in connection with the coup attempt and, in March, 32 people received death sentences, among them Dimka and the defence minister, Major General Illiya D. Bisalla.

=== 1983 coup ===
On 31 December 1983, a group of senior military officers led a coup which ended the Second Nigerian Republic. The coup deposed the democratically elected government of President Shehu Shagari, which, in the first military broadcast after the coup, Brigadier Sani Abacha called "inept and corrupt". Abacha, who was himself appointed head of state a decade later, was said to have played "a key role" in the coup. The sole reported casualty occurred when Brigadier Ibrahim Bako was killed in a fire fight during Shagari's arrest in Abuja. Major General Muhammed Buhari was installed as head of state.

=== 1985 coup ===
On 27 August 1985, officers led by Major General Ibrahim Babangida, the army chief of staff, usurped Buhari's government in a palace coup while Buhari himself was away from Lagos and his chief aide, Major General Tunde Idiagbon, was on a pilgrimage to Saudi Arabia. The coup was announced on the radio in the morning by Major General Joshua Dogonyaro, and Babangida later addressed the country, saying that Buhari's regime had been "rigid and uncompromising" and had demonstrated "inconsistency and incompetence".

=== 1990 coup attempt ===
On 22 April 1990, military officers led by Major Gideon Orkar attacked Dodan Barracks in an attempt to overthrow Babangida's administration. Babangida escaped successfully, and fighting stopped ten hours later, when senior military commanders elsewhere in the country announced their support for Babangida. 42 men convicted of involvement in the coup attempt were executed by firing squad in July 1990.

=== 1993 coup ===
Facing pressure to shift towards a democratic government, Babangida resigned and appointed Ernest Shonekan as interim president on 26 August 1993. Shonekan's transitional administration lasted only three months: on 17 November 1993, it was overthrown in a palace coup led by General Sani Abacha. This followed the annulment of the presidential elections which had been advertised as the beginning of a Third Nigerian Republic. In September 1994, although he had pledged to restore democracy, Abacha issued a decree that placed his government above the jurisdiction of the courts, effectively giving him absolute power.

== Coup plots ==
In recent decades, there have been several high-profile arrests in connection with alleged coup plots:

- In December 1985, Babangida's government announced that it had thwarted a coup attempt and had arrested those responsible, including Major General Mamman Vatsa. Thirteen military officers received the death penalty for conspiracy to commit treason, and ten of them, including Vatsa, were executed by firing squad in March 1986.
- In July 1995, Abacha's government convicted 40 people of plotting a coup. Obasanjo, a former head of state, was among those imprisoned, as was Musa Yar'Adua.
- In December 1997, Abacha's government announced that it had thwarted a coup attempt planned by his deputy, Lieutenant General Oladipo Diya, who had recently narrowly escaped an assassination attempt. Also arrested were three other generals, five colonels, and three other senior officers. Critics suspected that the alleged coup was a cover for a purge.
- In April 2004, Obasanjo's democratically elected government said that it had arrested several military officers in connection to a coup plot. Hamza al-Mustapha, Abacha's chief of security, was suspected of involvement.
- In late September 2025, a coup plot against the Tinubu administration which was uncovered by Nigerian military intelligence and leaked by Sahara Reporters. Independence Day military parade scheduled for 1 October 2025 was cancelled, sixteen military officers were arrested by the Defence Intelligence Agency. Initial reports of the plot were denied by the military who downplayed the arrests as disciplinary in nature. The plot allegedly involved officers of northerner extraction masterminded by Colonel Mohammed Ma'aji and led by Brigadier General Musa Abubakar Sadiq with alleged financial support from former governor and petroleum minister Timipre Slyva. The plotters planned to violently overthrow the federal government on 25 October by assassinating the President and several high-ranking government officials. Tinubu replaced the military service chiefs on 18 October, with General Olufemi Oluyede promoted to chief of defence staff and investigations are still ongoing.

== Patterns ==
According to Nigerian historian Max Siollun, "Military coups and military rule (which began as an emergency aberration) became a seemingly permanent feature of Nigerian politics." The abundance of natural resources have also been cited as a reason for the prevalence of military coups in Nigeria's history.

The regional rivalries which have played such a large part in recurrence of coups were a result of colonialism creating an artificial state encompassing several different distinct ethnic groups. These distinct ethnic groups were represented by regional parties, which ensured that "none of the parties could govern Nigeria on its own, and… that conflict was only a matter of time away." Therefore, there was no centralised opposition to military rule; when a coup occurred, it was therefore just another faction of military rule.

== Effects of military rule ==
The economic effects of military rule were disastrous. The traditional agricultural based economy was abandoned and the Nigerian economy became extremely dependent on exports of oil which due to frequent fluctuations in oil prices led to an unstable economy. The Babangida regime was characterised by "gross incompetence and unbridled, waste and mismanagement, the privatisation of public office and public resources, the neglect of non-oil sectors and misplaced priorities". As a result of the military economic policy of the 1980s, 45% of foreign-exchange earnings were going into debt servicing and there was very little growth. This led to a rise in poverty, crime, child abuse, disease, institutional decay and urban dislocation. The instability and dissatisfaction caused by these policies was one of the causes of the consistent pattern of coups.

== See also ==
- History of Nigeria
- Military dictatorship in Nigeria
- List of coups and coup attempts by country
