= David Ejoor =

Nigerian politician and general (1932–2019)

Major General David Akpode Ejoor

Chief of Army Staff
- In office January 1971 – 29 July 1975
- Preceded by: Hassan Katsina
- Succeeded by: Theophilus Danjuma

Commandant of the Nigerian Defence Academy
- In office January 1969 – January 1971
- Preceded by: Brig M.R. Varma
- Succeeded by: Maj-Gen. R.A. Adebayo

Governor of Mid-Western Region
- In office January 1966 – August 1967
- Preceded by: Dennis Osadebay
- Succeeded by: Albert Okonkwo

Personal details
- Born: 10 January 1932. Ovu, British Nigeria (now Delta State, Nigeria)
- Died: 10 February 2019 (aged 87) Lagos, Nigeria
- Party: Unaffiliated

Military service
- Allegiance: Nigeria
- Branch/service: Nigerian Army
- Rank: Major general

David Akpode Ejoor RCDS, PSC, (10 January 1932 – 10 February 2019) was a Nigerian military officer who served as Chief of Army Staff (COAS).

== Career ==
Early in Ejoor's career, he commanded the guard at the flag-raising ceremony at midnight on Nigerian Independence Day. Ejoor later claimed that then-Lieutenant Colonel Chukwuemeka Odumegwu Ojukwu had approached him and future military Head of State Yakubu Gowon to discuss a coup plot amid the 1964 election crisis.

On the week before the January 1966 coup d'état, Ejoor—who had recently succeeded Adekunle Fajuyi as commander of the Enugu-based 1st Battalion—was in Lagos attending a brigade conference along with many other senior officers. On the night of 14 January, many of these officers (including Ejoor and several coup plotters) went to a party celebrating Brigadier Zakariya Maimalari's marriage. Afterwards, Ejoor returned to his Ikoyi hotel, waking up the next morning to spent shell casings and bloodstains on the floors from the aftermath of the ambush on fellow hotel guest Lieutenant-Colonel Abogo Largema, a putschist target who was shot dead by Emmanuel Ifeajuna and Godfrey Ezedigbo during the night. Realizing that the military was in crisis, Ejoor reported to General Officer Commanding Johnson Aguiyi-Ironsi at 2nd Battalion headquarters in Ikeja; Aguiyi-Ironsi—who had narrowly escaped several putschist attempts to capture him—initially did not trust Ejoor, asking “David, are you with me or against me?” while holding a pistol. After Ejoor assured Aguiyi-Ironsi of his loyalty, the GOC ordered Ejoor back to Enugu to command his 1st Battalion. Arriving by plane just before noon, Ejoor found that his battalion had heeded orders from coup plotter Ifeajuna to "take over key installations and arrest government ministers" without realizing that they were abetting a coup. Ejoor ordered those soldiers back to the barracks, deployed future minister and then-Lieutenant Yohanna Kure to prevent any attempt to break jailed opposition leader Obafemi Awolowo out of prison, and dispatched future Chief of Staff SMHQ and then-Lieutenant Shehu Musa Yar'Adua to arrest Lieutenant Aloysius Akpuaka, "the officer who relayed Ifeajuna's orders to the battalion."

Within a few days, the coup was successfully repressed and Aguiyi-Ironsi took power as the first military Head of State. Upon the installation of the military government, Ejoor—as the most senior military officer in the Eastern Region—made a broadcast announcing the new government and declaring himself as the military government's regional representative. However, Ejoor was swiftly redeployed to become the Military Governor of his native Mid-Western Region. In his new administrative role, Ejoor became known for his strictness, locking out tardy civil servants before publicly admonishing them in the main square in Benin City. Additionally, Ejoor was an ex officio member of the Supreme Military Council, also being its only member from the Mid-West. It was due to this office that Ejoor was able to later reveal that the SMC had already privately decided to hold trials for the January putschists by the time of the counter-coup; one of the main grievances of the counter-coup plotters were the delayed trials.

In the early morning of 29 July 1966, Ojukwu—then serving as Military Governor of the Eastern Region—called Ejoor to inform him of the mutiny in Abeokuta that set off the counter-coup. Unaware that the commander of the Ibadan-based 4th battalion Joseph Akahan was a key coup leader, Ejoor later called Akahan for an update; Akahan lied by claiming that his unit was completely normal when in fact troops of the 4th battalion had surrounded the Government House in Ibadan and would later kill both Aguiyi-Ironsi and Western Region Military Governor Adekunle Fajuyi. Hours later as the full national picture of the counter-coup was understood, Ejoor addressed the few soldiers in Benin City—unlike other major cities, Benin lacked a permanent military base so the only soldiers were members of Ejoor's security detail—successfully pleading with the guards to remain peaceful. With no mutiny in the Mid-West and the leading putschists negotiating at Ikeja, Ejoor played a role in the negotiations via telephone with the full talks ending in the emergence of Yakubu Gowon as military Head of State. Although he continued in his position as governor, the post-coup turmoil lead to significant unrest — most notably, when 4th battalion troops in Benin City for a funeral raided a prison holding detainees from the January coup attempt, the soldiers freed northern detainees but tortured Igbo prisoners to death. The raid led to a "vehement but ultimately fruitless protest" by Ejoor to Gowon.

After surviving both coups, then-Governor Ejoor remained in the Supreme Military Council under Gowon by 1967. As such, he was an Aburi meeting attendee and was involved in the primary discussions with Ojukwu. After the failure of the Aburi Accord and the breakout of war, Biafran forces invaded the Mid-West in August 1967 in an attempt to swiftly end the war. When capturing Benin City, a Biafran unit attempted to capture Ejoor in an assault on his residence but he escaped and fled to Lagos. When Nigerian forces led by Colonel Murtala Muhammed successfully counter-attacked, Muhammed appointed Major Samuel Ogbemudia as the Military Administrator of the Mid-West. Although Muhammed made the decision unilaterally without the consent of his superiors, Ogbemudia remained in office. Later in the war, Ejoor replaced M.R. Varma—an Indian expatriate brigadier—as the Commandant of the Nigerian Defence Academy until 1971. He then served as Chief of Army Staff from January 1971 to July 1975.

== Personal life and death ==
Ejoor was born on 10 January 1932 to an Urhobo family in Ovu. He was an adherent of Catholicism.

Ejoor died in Lagos on 10 February 2019. He was 87.

== Works ==
- Ejoor David: Reminiscences, 1989
- Ejoor, David Akpode (1989). Reminiscences. Malthouse Press Ltd. ISBN 978-978-2601-37-7.
