= Operation UNICORD =

- Part of Biafran War
- Operation UNICORD (Nigeria)
Date	2–12 July 1967 (1 week and 3 days)
Location	Northern Biafran border, Nsukka, Ogoja and neighboring towns.
Result	Nigerian victory

Belligerents
Nigeria	Biafra

Commanders and leaders
Sule Apalo; Martin Adamu; Gado Nasko; Muhammadu Buhari	H.M. Njoku; Chukwuma Nzeogwu †

Strength
Unknown	Unknown

Casualties and losses
Unknown	Unknown

The Operation UNICORD (2 – 12 July 1967) was an offensive launched by the Nigerian Army at the beginning of the Nigerian Civil War. It involved the capture of 6 major Biafran towns near their northern border.

== Background ==
When Nigeria became an independent state in October 1960 the newly formed government consisted mainly of northern politicians from the Hausa-Fulani ethnic group. Early on, the Nigerian government became corrupt with various politicians swindling public funds and rigging votes. By 1965, the Nigerian government became so corrupt that uprisings against the government sprang up all across Nigeria with various politicians attempting to gain more power. This resulted in rioting and mass arrests in the cities of Lagos and Ibadan.

The politician Obafemi Awolowo was blamed for causing the riots and was sentenced to 10 years in a Nigerian prison. All of the chaos that occurred in the political realm gave was to the 1966 Nigerian coup d'etat in which 11 senior politicians were killed by soldiers led by the Army Major Emmanuel Ifeajuna.

The Nigerian Prime Minister Abubakar Balewa was one of the 11 politicians assassinated during the coup of 15 January. Nzeogwu's soldiers were forced to retreat to Kaduna after General Johnson Aguiyi-Ironsi was able to assemble a force of soldiers in Lagos to combat the rebellious soldiers.

Ironsi was made Supreme Commander of Nigeria on 16 January 1966.

Many northern generals and politicians were angry at Ironsi for two reasons, because he did not execute Major Nzeogwu and because he was giving more and more political power to southern politicians.

On 29 July 1966, Ironsi was assassinated by mutinous soldiers which included William Walbe after they wrestled command from Theophilus Danjuma and installed Colonel Yakubu Gowon as Head of State.

The counter-coup resulted in the 1966 anti-Igbo pogrom and caused the brutal massacre of 50,000 Igbo civilians living in various northern cities such as Kano and Kaduna. These massacres angered many Igbo civilians and an inadvertently led to easterns calling for secession. Ojukwu met with President Gowon in Aburi, Ghana in December 1966 to discuss the situation that was occurring in Nigeria.

An apparent vote was held by a consultative assembly appointed by Ojukwu, and they approved of a secession of a secular Igbo state. It is said that from all indications the decision to secede had already been made around late 1966 by Ojukwu and his closest confidants which included Louis Chude-Sokei, Christopher Okigbo, and the very influential CC Mojekwu.

On 30 May 1967 Ojukwu officially seceded the Eastern Region and proclaimed the new Republic of Biafra. Ojukwu managed to assemble a 3,000 man guerrilla force to defend Biafra's front lines. In early July 1967 Nigerian President Gowon ordered the Nigerian Army high command to regain control of the Eastern Region.

== Battle ==
On 2 July 1967 the Nigerian Army opened its offensive operations from the Northern sector.

The First Area Command NA, supported by an artillery brigade consisting of reconnaissance vehicles, Saladin armored cars and Ferrets, was divided into two brigades.

The 1st brigade under Maj. Sule Apalo advanced down the Ogugu-Ogunga-Nsukka road while the 2nd brigade under Maj. Martin Adamu advanced down the Gakem-Obudu-Ogoja road. Defending Biafran soldiers under Brig. Hilary Njoku managed to repel the attack, however, the Nigerian Army began recruiting guides and informants to report on the disposition of Biafran troops, their strength, and other crucial information.

For 10 days the Nigerian Army fought its way southward and managed to capture the towns of Nsukka, Ogugu, Ogunga, Ogoja, Gakem, and Obudu while also forcing defending Biafran troops to retreat in disarray.

Many Biafran soldiers complained of malaria, headache, and other ailments. Thousands of Biafran civilians fled their homes, in fear of being massacred by Nigerian soldiers, and headed for the Biafran capital, Enugu.

== Aftermath ==
16 days after the Biafrans retreated Nzeogwu attempted to regain control of Nsukka on 30 July but was killed by Nigerian soldiers while driving down a road.

The Nigerian Army were successful in their conquest of Nsukka, and then continued their onslaught towards Enugu though at a slower pace because of the invasion of the mid-western region.

After the Biafran officers led by Victor Banjo invaded Nigeria's Mid-Western Region. Murtala Mohammed was put in charge of fending off all Biafran soldiers within Nigeria's boundaries. Victor Banjo got within 135 miles of the Nigerian capital Lagos before he was intercepted by Mohammed's men.

After over a month of bloody fighting the Biafrans retreated to Onitsha and released their hold over the Mid-Western Region. With the Midwest Invasion over, the Nigerians returned to Nsukka and began planning an invasion of the Biafran Capital Enugu.

Due to Nsukka's proximity to Enugu, it was a strategic stronghold. Nigerian forces invaded the area around Enugu in mid-September 1967 with the knowledge that Enugu would not fall easily if attacked head-on, so it was decided to surround the city and begin a siege.

On 30 September, Nigerian forces were able to break through the Biafran defensive lines around Enugu and enter the city. After 6 days of bloody fighting the Biafran forces retreated to the outskirts, and relocated their capital south to Umuahia.
