= Midwest Invasion of 1967 =

Nigerian military operation

- Part of Biafran War
- The approximate lines of attack used by the Biafran forces in red during the Midwest Invasion of 1967
| Date | 9 August – October 1967 (1 month, 1 week and 4 days) |
| Location | Mid-Western Region, Nigeria; Now Edo and Delta States, Nigeria |
| Result | Nigerian victory |

Belligerents
| Nigeria | Biafra; Republic of Benin (19–20 September) |

Commanders and leaders
| (Nigeria) Murtala Muhammed (Nigeria) Benjamin Adekunle | (Republic of Biafra) Odumegwu Ojukwu (Republic of Biafra) Victor Banjo (Republic of Biafra) Festus Akagha (Republic of Biafra) Humphrey Chukwuka (Republic of Biafra) Mike Inveso; Albert Okonkwo |

Strength
| Initially: 300+: Total: several divisions | Initially: 3,000; 100 trucks; Total: 7,000 |

Casualties and losses
| Unknown | 2,000 |

The Midwest Invasion of 1967 or Midwest Offensive, codenamed Operation Torch, was a military operation between Nigerian and Biafran military forces during the Nigerian Civil War. The invasion began on 9 August when 3,000 Biafran soldiers led by General Victor Banjo crossed the River Niger Bridge into Asaba. Upon reaching Agbor, the Biafrans split up. With the 12th Battalion moving west capturing Benin City and Ore, the 18th Battalion swung south, taking Warri, Sapele and Ughelli, while the 13th Battalion headed north for Auchi, Agenebode and Okene. Simultaneously, a plot to capture Mid-Western Governor David Ejoor at his home in Benin failed. Nevertheless, the Biafrans, meeting virtually no resistance, had seized the entire Mid-Western Region in less than 12 hours.

Plans were drawn for the 12th Battalion to continue its advance towards Lagos and Ibadan. However, it was cripplingly delayed due to arguments between Ojukwu and Victor Banjo on whom to appoint as governor of the Mid-West, giving Gowon enough time to assemble a defensive line in the west. Also, during the occupation there was widespread hostility between native Urhobo-Isoko, Ijoid and Itsekiri people against the occupying Igbo soldiers. Igbo and native militia groups launched hit and run and reprisal raids against each other. In an attempt to ease tension, Ojukwu proclaimed the Republic of Benin (1967) under governor Albert Okonkwo on 19 September, only for Nigerian troops to enter Benin the next day on the 20th, ending the new republic's 24 hour span.

The Biafran situation rapidly deteriorated following a Nigerian attack by Murtala Muhammed's 2nd Division at Ore, forcing the Biafrans to immediately retreat. In a large pincer movement, another Nigerian force headed south from Auchi towards Benin, as Benjamin Adekunle's 3rd Marine Commando division landed at Warri and promptly took Ughelli and Sapele. Benin was liberated in a three pronged attack from North, West and South which met little resistance. Biafran troops that were able to retreat fled across the Niger River Bridge into Biafra, destroying it afterwards. Those that were cut off abandoned their weaponry and uniforms and blended into the civilian population until it was safe to return east.

The Biafran retreat from Ore is considered the turning point of the war.

== Background ==
=== Pre-War Events ===
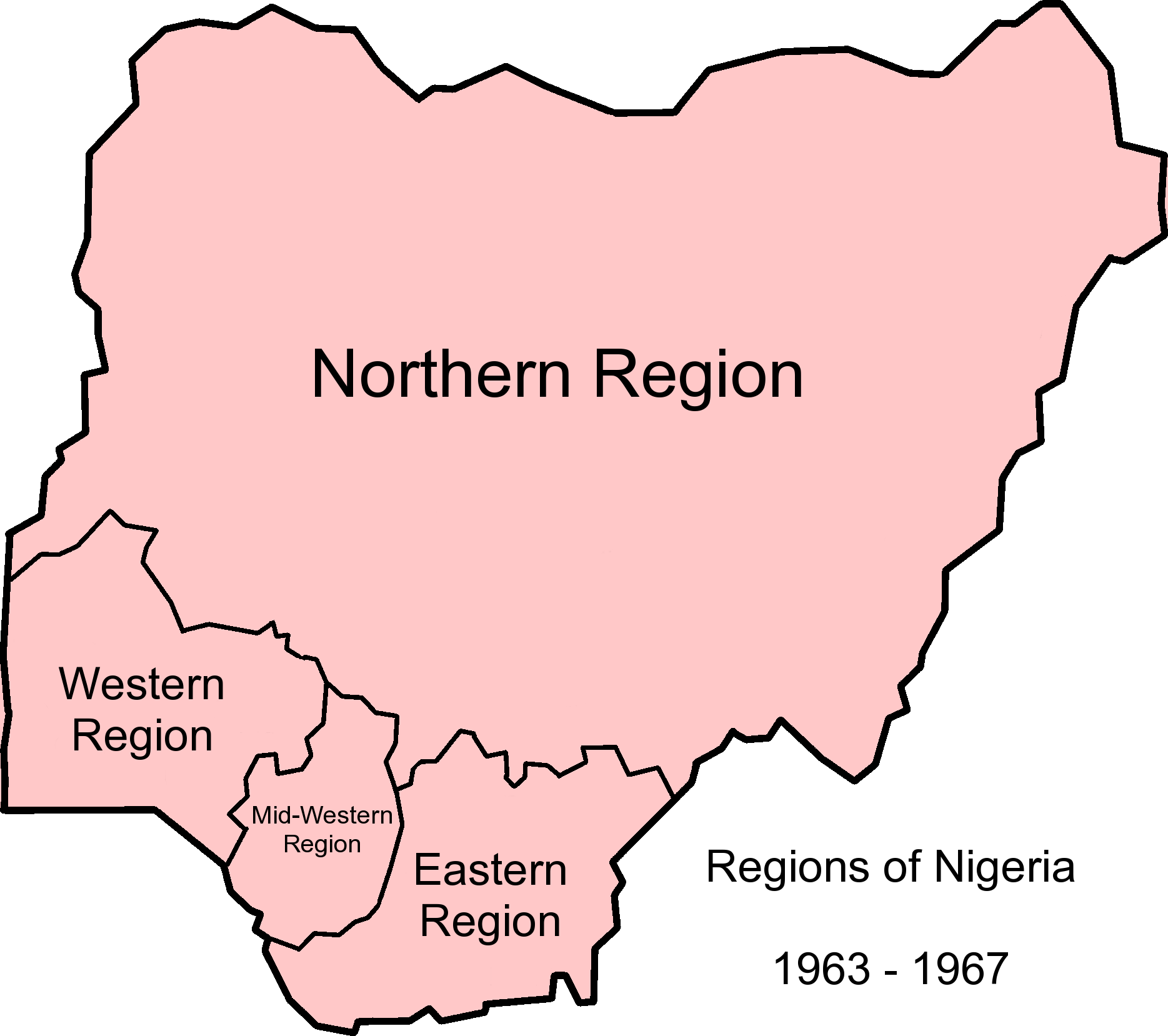
Nigerian military districts at the time of the civil war

Following the 1966 Nigerian coup d'état and the subsequent 1966 Nigerian counter-coup, a wave of resentment and hostility against Igbos because of their involvement in the former coup culminated in the 1966 anti-Igbo pogrom in which 30,000 Igbos and easterners have been estimated to have been killed. Following the erosion of military discipline and trust caused by the killings, a new regional military structure was formed with Military districts in the four regions (Northern, Western, Mid-Western, and Eastern) of the country. However, this raised problems as the ethnic structure of the Mid-Western military was heavily lopsided towards the Midwestern Igbos, who not only made up a sizable portion of troops, but over 75% of the 42 Mid-western officers were Igbo. In an attempt to prevent abuse of power, Ejoor refused to allow a group consisting of Yon DaKolo and Lt. Col. Mike Okwechime from importing weapons, instead choosing to ask the federal government for weapons directly, of which they sent a small amount of Mark V rifles for the 300 soldiers in the area. This, along with the lack of effort to raise any new troops left the Mid-Western region in an incapacitated state by the time the Biafrans invaded in 1967.

At the September 1966 constitutional conference for the future of the country, the Midwest was the only region in favor of a strong federation. Seeing that the oil, cocoa and palm oil rich region would quickly find itself a target of expansionist leanings by its larger, more powerful and consolidated neighbors. This was disagreed upon by many Midwestern Igbo officers, who believed the confederate and secessionist proposals by the other regions were a better approach to the issue, but this was dismissed by Ejoor and his cabinet. Further negotiations were held in Aburi and Benin. Even so, differences in the interpretation in these accords led to an even greater divide between Ojukwu and the Federal Government, later leading to Biafra's declaration of independence on 30 May 1967.

=== Post-war events ===
During a 7 June military conference in Lagos following the Biafran declaration of independence, Ejoor was told "Midwestern State will be kept free from active operations unless where necessary, but the border between the Eastern States and the Midwest will be completely sealed off." Traffic across the Niger River Bridge was halted and the Midwest government abided by the federal authorities' imposition of an embargo on Biafra, though some trade among civilians persisted through cross-river activities. Later in a speech in Asaba, Ejoor reiterated that the midwest would not be sucked into a war between the East and the North. This was followed by a redeployment of Federal troops away from Okene. By the time of the start of the invasion, there was only a token force of 300 troops in the entire Mid-Western military command.

After Nsukka fell to the Nigerian Army on 14 July during Operation UNICORD, President Odumegwu Ojukwu knew that the Nigerian Army would next set their sights on the Biafran capital of Enugu. After a mission to recapture Nsukka on 30 July failed and resulted in death of Major Kaduna Nzeogwu, Ojukwu began drawing up plans for an invasion of Nigeria's Mid-Western Region in an attempt to divert attention away from Enugu, as well as to perhaps bring a quick end to the war. In Ojukwu's words: "Our motive was not territorial ambition or the desire of conquest. We went into the Midwest purely in an effort to seize the serpent by the head; every other activity in that Republic was subordinated to that single aim. We were going to Lagos to seize the villain Gowon, and we took necessary military precautions."

== Invasion ==
On the night of 8 August, a Biafran assault company landed at John Holt Beach in Asaba. Within minutes they had captured the post office and catering Rest House, and had disconnected all major communication lines in the city. At 3 a.m. On 9 August 1967 after a signal was given, a 3000 strong mobilized rifle brigade of Biafran soldiers under General Victor Banjo crossed the River Niger Bridge at Onitsha and entered Asaba, the core of what was to be the 101st division, dubbed the "Liberation Army of Nigeria" and "Midwest Expeditionary Force" with Lt. Col Emmanuel Ifeajuna as its Chief of Staff, and Joe Isichie as its quartermaster general. Banjo announced over Benin Radio that the incursion was "designed to insulate the people of the Midwest from the coercive threats of Northern military presence". The Biafrans encountered minimal opposition in Asaba due to the collusion of several Igbo officers in the Midwest Army garrison, some of whom then defected. According to British journalist Frederick Forsyth, who was trailing the Biafran column, the "two dozen or so" Nigerian troops defending the bridge were "swept aside". According to garrison commander Godwin Alabi-Isama, Biafrans killed several Hausa civilians in the city before continuing their advance.

When the Biafrans reached Agbor they split into three fronts. With the Biafran 12th Battalion under Lt. Col. Festus Akagha moving west to Benin City, which was captured with little opposition as Biafran soldiers fired their weapons into the air upon entering the city. The 18th Battalion under Major Humphrey Chukwuka made its way into the oil-rich Niger Delta, towards Warri, Sapele and Ughelli, while the 13th Battalion under Col. Mike Inveso swung northwards towards Auchi and Agenebode. By 13 August, they succeeded in also taking Okene, Iloshi and Atanai. A detachment was also sent to Jebba to destroy a bridge over the Niger River there. The 13th Battalion was given the job of defending the Biafran north flank while also cutting off Nigerian supplies going to Nsukka. A Nigerian Army unit was pursued by Biafran soldiers to the Siluko River where the two sides exchanged fire, before the Nigerians managed to escape under the cover of darkness. Unbeknownst to General Banjo a unit of Biafran soldiers under Midwestern Lt. Col. Ochei attacked the government residence of Mid-Western Region governor David Ejoor in Benin on the orders of President Odumegwu Ojukwu to capture Ejoor dead or alive. Fortunately for Ejoor, Quartermaster Lt. Col. Ogbemudia changed the guard detail at the government house the night prior, replacing troops that were in on the plot to hand over Ejoor. His guards resisted the attacking Biafrans which gave Ejoor enough time to escape and flee to Lagos. Within 12 hours of the initial invasion the Biafran Army had control over the entire Mid-Western Region, most of it taken without a fight.

The 12th Battalion was transformed into the 12th Brigade and given the job of quickly capturing Ibadan and Lagos from two axes at the towns of Ore and Okitipupa but this was postponed for three days while President Ojukwu and General Banjo argued over whom to appoint Governor/Administrator of the Mid-Western Region. Not wanting to appoint an Igbo over non-Igbo citizens General Banjo suggested that either David Ejoor, Samuel Ogbemudia, or Col. Trimnell be made governor but Ojukwu refused and ultimately placed the Midwest Igbo medical-officer Albert Okonkwo governor. When General Banjo returned to Benin City on 12 August he resumed the extremely delayed advance of the 12th Brigade to make its way to the town of Ore but not to attack Ibadan or Lagos until further notice. In Warri, Major Chukwuka released Major Adewale Ademoyega, who had been recently transferred from Uyo to Warri after getting into a fistfight with Major Emannuel Ifeajuna. After seizing all the weapons in Warri police station he made his way to Benin City, where he was put in command of the newly formed 19th Battalion, which consisted of 700 recently conscripted soldiers meant to support the new 12th brigade at Benin. The next day Major Ademoyega relieved Ifeajuna of his command and replaced him with Lt. Col. Henry Igboba. Ifeajuna then returned to Enugu as the 101st division's liaison officer.

Biafran troops entered the Western State on 17 August. They were able to advance 17 miles facing more sustained resistance before being stopped at Ore the following day after federal forces obstructed their advance by demolishing several bridges. On 21 August, Ojukwu appealed over Radio Biafra to the international community to facilitate a ceasefire and peace talks.

== Occupation ==
After being appointed as Governor of the Midwest on 17 August, Okonkwo the same day installed a dusk to dawn curfew in which only citizens with passes would be allowed to move freely at night, along with other measures equivalent to martial law. The administration was structured in to empower those who supported the invasion, rather than the traditional seniority hierarchy. Local governments in the area were directed to donate materials to Enugu to support the war effort. Salt was rationed because of its use for explosive making. The loss of northern supply of cattle caused meat to be rationed as well. Shortages of other goods soon came about. However, not all of the supplies were distributed fairly among the people. Traffic between Biafra and the Midwest across the Niger River bridge was reopened and trade between the two regions was unrestricted.

The opinion of the mid westerners towards the Igbos prior to the invasion was indifferent if not negative. Festus Okotie-Eboh, arguably the most influential Midwestern politician at the time, was murdered in the Igbo dominated 1966 Nigerian coup d'état. Non-Igbo citizens, especially the Hausa community, were subject to harassment, assault, and murder from Biafran soldiers while women were often molested and sometimes raped, in retaliation for the 1966 anti-Igbo pogrom. Resistance groups began springing up constantly consisting of mainly ethnic Urhobos and Ijaws. Because of a series of uprisings against the occupying Biafrans in Benin City, General Okonkwo began raising a force of loyal native inhabitants to combat the rebels. By 18 August Okonkwo had assembled a force of 780 reliable volunteers to keep natives from attacking or killing Biafran soldiers. Loyal inhabitants donated whatever weaponry they had to the Biafrans, which consisted mainly of single-shot rifles and double-barreled shotguns. Cooks began poisoning Biafran soldiers whenever they had the chance to and it was because of this that Biafran soldiers began only eating food that was cooked by ethnic Igbos or self-cooked. Rebellious natives who did not wish to fight would often seduce Biafran soldiers to get information out of them and tell Nigerian authorities. On 20 August a group of Urhobo/Ijaw rebels raided a Biafran camp and were successful in killing 50 soldiers while 16 rebels were killed in the skirmish. Due to these rebellions Biafran soldiers began raiding and pillaging villages throughout both the Mid-Western Region and Niger Delta inhabited by anyone other than Igbo civilians. The Biafran government began broadcasting Biafran propaganda in the region while the Nigerian government broadcast anti-Biafran propaganda as well. On 20 September, Okonkwo declared the creation of the "Republic of Benin".

== Nigerian counteroffensive ==
The loss of the Midwest and a minor aerial attack on Lagos by a Biafran bomber stoked panic among federal authorities and led Gowon to declare a policy of "total war" against Biafra. The federal government quickly organised the Nigerian 2nd Division with some trained soldiers, veterans, support forces, prisoners, and large numbers of untrained volunteers and placed it under the command of Colonel Murtala Muhammed. On 12 September, Banjo ordered his forces to evacuate Benin City. Shortly thereafter, he directed his troops to withdraw from Warri, Sapele, Auchi, Igueben, and other locales.

On 20 September, while the Biafran 12th Brigade was stationed in Ore, the Nigerian 2nd Division attacked the Biafrans and almost immediately forced them to retreat. The retreating Biafrans destroyed the Oluwa Bridge and managed to get a vital head-start in front of the advancing Nigerians. When the 12th Brigade reached Benin City they alerted their comrades, and instead of mounting a defense, the Biafran troops began looting the city, even stealing about £2 million from the Midwest Central Bank. When the Nigerian 2nd Division arrived in Benin City they discovered the city largely abandoned but managed to find a trapped Biafran unit stationed in the Benin Prison, most of whom were killed attempting to escape. Meanwhile, the Nigerian 3rd Marine Division under Colonel Benjamin Adekunle began landing in Warri and captured it along with Sapele and Ughelli. Most Biafran soldiers trapped behind enemy lines abandoned their uniforms and weapons before integrating into the local communities, escaping eastward when they had the chance.

To support federal ground operations in the Midwest, the Nigerian Navy redeployed some of its ships from the Bonny area to the mouth of the Escravos River, where sailors outfitted several Gulf Oil rigs with anti-aircraft guns. By the morning of 21 September the naval force had proceeded up the river and berthed at Sapele. Soldiers and sailors from the ships secured the towns of Warri, Burutu, and Koko. On 25 September, Biafran forces attempted to take advantage of the navy's focus on the Midwest by launching Operation Sea Jack against the federal garrison in Bonny. As a result, the federal ships returned to Bonny and helped to repulse the attack.

Banjo's delays in furthering the Biafran advance and subsequent early withdrawal from the Midwest led to rumours in Biafran circles that he intended on betraying the Biafran cause. On 19 September, Banjo was summoned to Enugu to explain his actions to Ojukwu. He was quickly arrested, reportedly confessed to plotting against Ojukwu, tried by a tribunal, and executed on 22 September. The affair undermined Biafran confidence in its military leadership.

The Nigerian 2nd Division continued to pursue the Biafrans eastward into early October. Federal forces reached the outskirts of Asaba on 4 October and secured the campus of St. Patrick's College after some fighting. Biafran troops under Colonel Joseph Achuzia withdrew to the Niger River Bridge, some discarding their uniforms as they went. The following afternoon, federal forces under Colonel Ike Omar Sanda Nwachukwu passed through Asaba and secured the western landing of the Niger River Bridge. They reported that Biafran troops had placed explosive charges on the bridge. Gowon instructed Colonel Muhammed to refrain from crossing the bridge at that time, fearing an immediate attempt to do so would frighten the Biafrans into blowing it up. Muhammed did not believe the Biafrans had sufficient explosives to destroy the bridge. Despite the protests of some of his subordinates, he led a group of officers onto the bridge on 6 October. The Biafrans then detonated the eastern spans of the bridge, causing it to partially collapse and rendering it useless.

== Aftermath ==
=== Effects on Midwest Region ===
According to historian Max Siollun, the invasion "was a disastrous political miscalculation by Biafra" that eliminated what sympathy the secessionist state had in the Midwest and Western regions and led some Nigerians to conclude that it not only wanted to defend itself but sought to expand its territory. Historian S. E. Orobator, arguing that the invasion failed to severely hamper federal advances into Biafran territory, caused infighting in Biafra's military leadership, and dissipated popular sympathy for the secession in the Midwest concluded that "In sum, Biafra would have benefited more from the Midwest had she maintained the existing relationship, instead of embarking on an invasion which eventually mutilated against her over-all interests" and "will go down on record [...] as one of the most severe strategic blunders in contemporary wars of secession."

After retaking the Midwest, Colonel Muhammed, without consulting Gowon, appointed Samuel Ogbemudia military governor of the state. Ogbemudia held the post for eight years. Igbo civilians in the Midwest experienced violence from federal troops and non-Igbo residents after the departure of the Biafran forces. On 7 October 1967, citizens of Asaba were forced to leave their homes and attend a public dance in Asaba. When the civilians arrived in downtown Asaba they were massacred by the 2nd Division, under the supervision of Lt. Colonel Murtala Muhammed, in retaliation for the assassination of Ahmadu Bello at the hands of Kaduna Nzeogwu one year earlier. This massacre became known as the Asaba massacre. Total deaths of Igbo civilians due to retaliatory violence in the Midwest after the invasion are unknown. One of Muhammed's subordinates, Lieutenant Ishola Williams, accused him of ordering the execution of prisoners of war during the campaign. The Niger River Bridge was restored in 1972.

=== Course of the war ===
The Biafran invasion of the Midwest and its reversal by federal forces led the international community to predict an eventual federal victory in the conflict but raised fears of an intense and prolonged war. The apparent boldness of the attack garnered respect for Ojukwu's military capabilities in both Nigerian and international circles. Biafra never attempted to launch another major offensive against federal territory and instead focused on more defensive operations for the rest of the war. The 2nd Division invaded Onitsha and managed to capture and hold onto control of the city for less than a day before they were surrounded and massacred by Biafran soldiers.

== Works cited ==
- Baxter, Peter (2015). Biafra: The Nigerian Civil War 1967-1970. Helion and Company. ISBN 9781910777473.
- Bird, S. Elizabeth; Ottanelli, Fraser M. (2017). The Asaba Massacre: Trauma, Memory, and the Nigerian Civil War. Cambridge University Press. ISBN 9781108509466.
- Gould, Michael (2012). Struggle for Modern Nigeria : The Biafran War, 1967-1970. London: I. B. Tauris. ISBN 9780857730954.
- Nwaokocha, Odigwe A. (December 2021). "Exchange over troubled waters: the Anioma and the war-time trade with Biafra, 1967-1970". Brazilian Journal of African Studies. 6 (12): 69–86. doi:10.22456/2448-3923.
- Ojukwu, C. Odumegwu (1969). Biafra - Selected Speeches with Journals of Events (2nd ed.).
- Orobator, S. E. (1987). "The Biafran Crisis and the Midwest". African Affairs. 86 (344): 367–383. doi:10.1093/oxfordjournals.afraf.a097919. JSTOR 722748.
- Siollun, Max (2009). Oil, Politics and Violence : Nigeria's Military Coup Culture (1966-1976). New York: Algora Publishing. ISBN 9780875867106.
- Stremlau, John J. (2015). The International Politics of the Nigerian Civil War, 1967–1970. Princeton: Princeton University Press. ISBN 9781400871285.
- Udeagbala, Lawrence Okechukwu (2022). "A Comparative Study of the Nigerian and Biafran Navies During the Nigerian Civil War (1967–70)". African Navies: Historical and Contemporary Perspectives (1st ed.). London: Routledge. pp. 91–108. ISBN 9781003309154.
- Venter, Al J. (2016). Biafra's War 1967–1970 : A Tribal Conflict in Nigeria That Left a Million Dead. Helion & Company. ISBN 9781910294697.
