= Daniel Bamidele =

Nigerian army officer (1949-1986)

Major Daniel Idowu Bamidele (1949 – 5 March 1986) was a Nigerian army officer who was executed by the government of Major General Ibrahim Babangida for failing to report an alleged conspiracy against the government, what is popularly referred to as the "Vatsa Coup". Bamidele was charged with conspiracy to commit treason.

== Education ==
Daniel Bamidele joined the Nigerian Army as a non commissioned officer in 1968 during the Nigerian Civil War where he fought in the 12th Commando Brigade initially under Colonel Benjamin Adekunle and later Colonel Olusegun Obasanjo. Bamidele was commissioned as an officer after formal training at the Nigerian Defence Academy on 29 July 1970.

== Career ==
Bamidele graduated from the advanced US Army Infantry course at Fort Benning, Georgia with outstanding recommendations - which led to a personal letter of commendation from then Chief of Army Staff Lt. Gen. Theophilus Danjuma. Bamidele attended the junior division of the Ghana Staff College Teshie, Ghana where he also distinguished himself, attaining the highest rank of command during the final military exercise. He was enrolled in the 3rd Command and Staff College Senior Course, Jaji from 1980 to 1981 and graduated in the top 5%.

According to military historian Nowa Omoigui, Bamidele held a number of interesting appointments during his career. From 1976-79 he was Grade II Staff Officer in the "G" Branch (operations) at Army HQ. When he returned from Teshie in 1979 he was appointed Grade II Staff Officer for Training at the Nigerian Defence Academy. After completing senior division staff training at Jaji he was made the General Staff Officer 2 (Operations and Training) at the HQ of the 3rd Armored Division in Jos. During this tour of duty he got nominated for service abroad. In 1982 he was the Operations Officer for the Nigerian Battalion (NIBATT) as part of the UN Interim Force in Lebanon (UNIFIL). This was the Nigerian Battalion in Lebanon at the time of the Israeli invasion. Indeed, it was the last Nigerian Battalion deployed there - President Shagari pulled Nigeria out of UNIFIL thereafter. Upon his return from Lebanon, Major Bamidele was the operations officer for the 3Div HQ during the border war with Chad.

== 31 December 1983 Coup plot ==
In October 1983 during an official trip to Kaduna to print his divisional brief for the Chief of Army Staff Conference, Daniel Bamidele heard of rumors about a planned coup against President Shagari. When he returned to Jos he promptly reported to his General Officer Commanding (GOC), Major General Muhammadu Buhari (who, unknown to Bamidele at that time was in the thick of the plot). A week later, Bamidele found himself on a plane to Lagos, detained by the Directorate of Military Intelligence at Tego Barracks and accused of plotting a coup against Shagari. Fake witnesses were paraded and a mock interrogation contrived, while reports were being made to the NSO (then under Umaru Shinkafi) to mislead the Shagari regime. Meanwhile, the real plot continued underground with the full involvement of the same Military Intelligence group that was interrogating him. Finally, on 25 November 1983, with no credible witness to nail him, and no legal basis to charge him for a one-man conspiracy, Bamidele was released. He returned to Jos, befuddled about what had actually transpired, until on 1 January 1984, his own GOC, Buhari, to whom he had reported the plot, emerged as the new Head of State!

In early 1984, Bamidele's name was listed for retirement. However, when the list got to Buhari for approval, he crossed Bamidele's name out - recognizing that the officer was caught in a complex vortex and web of intrigue. After being saved from retirement at the last minute he got deployed to Jaji as a Directing Staff.

== Arrest and execution ==
Bamidele was implicated in the conspiracy because of a meeting at a guest house in Makurdi with Lt Col Michael Iyorshe and some other officers (Lt Col Musa Bitiyong, Lt Col Christian Oche, Wing Commander Ben Ekele, and Wing Commander Adamu Sakaba) where political criticisms of the Babangida Administration were made but no seditious nor operational coup details were discussed.

Though the connections to any coup are arguable, Bamidele, learning from his ordeal in 1983, kept quiet about any coups, was arrested, tried by a special military tribunal and was executed by firing squad on 5 March 1986, along with others such as Major General Mamman Vatsa. Bamidele's words to the tribunal were

"I heard of the 1983 coup planning, told my GOC General Buhari who detained me for two weeks in Lagos. Instead of a pat on the back, I received a stab. How then do you expect me to report this one? This trial marks the eclipse of my brilliant and unblemished career of 19 years. I fought in the civil war with the ability it pleased God to give me. It is unfortunate that I'm being convicted for something which I have had to stop on two occasions. This is not self adulation but a sincere summary of the qualities inherent in me. It is an irony of fate that the president of the tribunal who in 1964 felt that I was good enough to take training in the UK is now saddled with the duty of showing me the exit from the force and the world"
