= Nowa Omoigui =

Nigerian military historian and cardiologist (1959–2021)

Nowamagbe Omoigui (28 March 1959 – 18 April 2021) was a Nigerian military historian and cardiologist.

== Early life and education ==
Nowa Omoigui attended Corona primary school, St Saviors Primary School, and St Mary's Primary School, all in Lagos, Nigeria. For his secondary education, Nowa Omoigui studied at the Federal Government College, Warri, and King's College, Lagos. For his undergraduate education, he studied at the University of Ibadan where he graduated with an MBBS with distinction.

== Interest in History ==
An autobiographical statement from the Uhrobo Historical Society for Nowa Omoigui reads:

"My amateur interest in History, Political Science and Strategic studies dates back to the sixties. My father was a federal civil servant. As a three-year-old, I lived in the same neighborhood (MacDonald Avenue) as Chief Anthony Enahoro and the late Senator Dalton Asemota (my mother's uncle) in Ikoyi, Lagos. Events relating to the Treasonable Felony Trial [of Obafemi Awolowo and Anthony Enahoro, among others], creation of the Midwest Region and the funeral of Senator Asemota were closely followed by my parents and many discussions were held in my presence, major elements of which, strangely, I still recall! As a seven year old, my family and I were awakened in the early hours of January 15, 1966, by our neighbor on Milverton Road (a British police officer) to tell us about the first coup. During the civil war I was the victim of a number of Biafran air-raids (which I never forgot)."

Nowa Omoigui gained unique and first hand insights (via relationships built with Nigerian military personnel) into many key events associated with Nigeria's military via a National Youth Service Corps posting with the Nigerian Army's Brigade of Guards in 1983. Nowa Omoigui was a member of the South Carolina Military History Club and was an amateur gun and military aircraft enthusiast.

== Writings, Analysis, and Insights ==
Nowa Omoigui's publications can be found on his website https://nowaomoigui.com

Nowa Omoigui wrote extensively about key events about Nigeria's history and Military coups in Nigeria: the 1966 Nigerian coup d'état, the Nigerian counter-coup of 1966, the Nigerian Palace Coup of 1975, the abortive 13 February 1976 coup, the Nigerian Military Coup of 31 December 1983, the palace coup of 1985, the Vatsa Coup Conspiracy of 1985, the 1990 Gideon Orkar Coup attempt among many others.
