= Mamman Jiya Vatsa =

Nigerian general and poet (1940–1986)

Major General Mamman Jiya Vatsa OFR

Minister of the Federal Capital Territory
- In office 1984 – December 1985
- Preceded by: Haliru Dantoro
- Succeeded by: Hamza Abdullahi

Personal details
- Born: 3 December 1940 Bida, Northern Region, British Nigeria (now Bida, Nigeria)
- Died: 5 March 1986 (aged 45) Lagos, Nigeria
- Party: None (military)
- Education: Government College Bida
- Alma mater: Nigerian Military Training College; Indian Military Academy

Military service
- Allegiance: Nigeria
- Branch/service: Nigerian Army
- Years of service: 1962–1986
- Rank: Major General
- Battles/wars: Nigerian Civil War; Nigeria-Cameroon conflict

Mamman Jiya Vatsa OFR (3 December 1940 – 5 March 1986) was a Nigerian general and poet who served as Minister of the Federal Capital Abuja, and was a member of the Supreme Military Council.

On 5 March 1986, he was executed by the military regime of General Ibrahim Babangida (who was his childhood friend) following a military tribunal conviction for treason associated with an abortive coup.

== Early life ==
Vatsa was childhood friends with Ibrahim Babangida and both men were peers who attended the same educational institutions. Like Babangida, Vatsa attended the Government College Bida from 1957 to 1962 and started his career with the Nigerian Army by enrolling in the Nigerian Military Training College (NMTC) on 10 December 1962.

== Military career ==
Since the NMTC was not yet an officer candidate commissioning institution (it would later become one in 1964 when it was upgraded and renamed to the Nigerian Defence Academy), the Nigerian government sent NMTC cadets who had completed their preparatory cadet training to foreign military academies for officer training and commissioning. After graduating from the Indian Military Academy, Dehradun, Vatsa was commissioned as a second lieutenant in the Nigerian Army

Vatsa, then a Lieutenant with the 4th Battalion in Ibadan, was one of the many officers of northern Nigerian origin, who staged (and were led by Lieutenant Colonel Murtala Muhammed in) what became known as the Nigerian counter-coup of 1966 because of grievances they felt towards the administration of General Aguiyi Ironsi's government which quelled the 15 January 1966 coup. Other participants in the coup included 2nd Lieutenant Sanni Abacha, Lieutenant Muhammadu Buhari, Lieutenant Ibrahim Babangida, Lieutenant Ibrahim Bako, and Lieutenant Buka Suka Dimka among others.

Vatsa commanded the 21 battalion during the Nigerian Civil War and wrote academic articles about the operational aspects of certain battles. In 1970, Vatsa was an instructor at the Nigerian Defence Academy, before being posted as a Principal Staff Officer at Army Headquarters. Subsequently, he commanded the 30 Infantry Brigade (Ogoja) until July 1975, 13 Infantry Brigade (Calabar) until February 1976, and the Brigade of Guards until 1979. It was during his tenure that the HQ of the Brigade of Guards was moved from Dodan Barracks to its Kofo Abayomi location in Victoria Island before transfer to Abuja.

== Military command ==
Vatsa subsequently served as Commandant of the Nigerian Army School of Infantry (NASI) 1979 to 1983. He developed the Special Warfare Wing and established the doctrinal basis for the establishment of the 82nd Composite Division of the Nigerian Army in Enugu, he was instrumental in naming the Division "82nd Div" after the 82nd West African Division in Burma. During the latter part of President Shehu Shagari's government, Vatsa was appointed Quarter-Master General (QMG), the post he held until the coup of December 1983. He was on leave during the Buhari coup against Shagari and did not take part.

In 1981, when Cameroon soldiers shot and killed five Nigerian soldiers in the disputed Bakassi area, then Brigadier Vatsa was named the Commander of the Joint Military Task Force during the massive border mobilization along the entire length of the Nigeria-Cameroon border. Vatsa developed the operational plan of attack through Garoua in northern Cameroon, which was approved in principle by the National Defence Council, pending the outcome of diplomatic efforts to resolve the crisis.

During 27 August 1985 Babangida take-over, General Vatsa was in Mecca with Major General Tunde Idiagbon on pilgrimage. As of the time of his arrest in December 1985 on suspicion of conspiracy to commit treason, he was the Federal Minister for the Federal Capital Territory. He was a member of the AFRC, Federal Executive Council and occasionally, the National Council of States, the only military officer, other than the C-in-C, to be a member of all three ruling bodies.

== Death ==
After being convicted and tried for treason, Vatsa was executed on March 5, 1986, by firing squad. With him were: Lt. Col. Musa Bityong, Lt. Col. Michael Iyorshe, Lt. Col. Christian A. Oche, Maj. Daniel I. Bamidele, Commander A.A. Ogwiji, Wing Commander B.E.N. Ekele, Wing Commander Adamu C. Sakaba, Squadron Leader Martin Olufolorunsho Luther and Squadron Leader A. Ahura.

In 2025, Vatsa received a posthumous pardon from Nigerian president Bola Tinubu.

== Works ==
Vatsa was also an accomplished poet and writer. Vatsa was a facilitator and patron of the arts in Nigeria, where he organized writing workshops for his fellow soldiers and their children and got their works published. He helped the Children's Literature Association of Nigeria with funds, built a Writers' Village for the Association of Nigerian Authors, and hosted their annual conferences. The Writers' Village finally became a reality on 24 January 2013, named in his honour.

He published eight poetry collections for adults and 11 for children with titles such as Back Again at Wargate (1982), Reach for the Skies (1984) and Verses for Nigerian State Capitals (1973). His books are about ordinary people's lives and simple creatures, including the pidgin collection Tori for Geti Bow Leg (1981), his cultural picture book in Hausa, Bikin Suna, and a charming picture storybook entitled Stinger the Scorpion (1979).

== Bibliography ==
- Verses for Nigerian State Capitals (poetry), 1973.
- Stinger the Scorpion - 1979.
- Tori for Geti Bow Leg and Other Pidgin Poems (1981), Yaba, Lagos, Nigeria: Cross Continent Press, 1985; illus. Ade J. Adeyanju.
- Bikin Suna
- Back Again at Wargate (poetry) 1982.
- Reach for the Skies (poetry) 1984.
