= Bukar Suka Dimka =

Nigerian military officer (1940–1976)

- Born: Bukar Suka Dimka; 1940; British Nigeria
- Died: 15 May 1976 (aged 35–36) Lagos, Nigeria
- Allegiance: Nigeria
- Branch: Nigerian Army
- Service years: 1963–1976
- Rank: Lieutenant Colonel

Lieutenant Colonel Bukar Suka Dimka (1940 – 15 May 1976) was a Nigerian military officer who played a leading role in the 13 February 1976 abortive military coup against the government of General Murtala Ramat Muhammed. Dimka had also participated in the Nigerian counter-coup of 1966 which toppled the government of General Aguiyi Ironsi.

== Military education and training ==
Dimka was commissioned as a Second-Lieutenant from the Australian Army Officer Cadet School, Portsea, into the Nigerian Army on 13 December 1963. He and Lt. Boniface Ikejiofor were the first two Nigerian Army officers to train in Australia and complete the 12 months course at the school with cadets from Australia, New Zealand, Malaysia, the Philippines and the Pacific Islands.

== Participation in the Nigerian counter-coup of July 1966 ==
Dimka, then a lieutenant with the Nigerian Military Training College in Kaduna, was one of many officers of northern Nigerian origin who staged what became known as the Nigerian counter-coup of 1966 because of grievances they felt towards the administration of General Aguiyi Ironsi's government which had quelled the 15 January 1966 coup. These officers included Lt. Colonel Murtala Muhammed (the coup leader whom Dimka conspired against and murdered ten years later), 2nd Lieutenant Sani Abacha, Lieutenant Muhammadu Buhari, Lieutenant Ibrahim Bako, Lieutenant Ibrahim Babangida, and Major Theophilus Danjuma among others. Dimka along with Lieutenant Dambo are alleged to have shot and killed Lieutenant Colonel Michael Okoro, Commander of the 3rd Battalion during the July mutiny. Another act of notoriety from the July mutiny was Dimka's pursuit and probable intent to murder his Brigade Major, Samuel Ogbemudia. Before the mutiny, Major Ogbemudia had detained Lieutenant Dimka for violating an order forbidding unauthorized troop movement. Under interrogation by Ogbemudia, Dimka complained of ethnic victimization and was subsequently released by Ogbemudia. Vexed by Ogbemudia's treatment of him, Dimka hatched a plot to kill Ogbemudia. However, Ogbemudia was tipped off by Major Abba Kyari and Colonel Hassan Katsina who provided an escape Land Rover armed with a submachine gun. Dimka marshaled a group of northern soldiers who pursued Ogbemudia (sometimes shooting) all the way from Kaduna to Owo, Ondo State where Ogbemudia abandoned his Land Rover (which had run out of fuel) and scaled a 6-foot fence into a dense jungle to escape Dimka and his soldiers.

== Participation in the 13 February 1976 coup and death ==
General Muhammed was assassinated along with his aide-de-camp Lieutenant Akintunde Akinsehinwa when his Mercedes-Benz was ambushed by a group of assassins consisting of Lieutenant Colonel Dimka, Major Rabo, Captain Parwang and Lieutenant Seri in Ikoyi, Lagos. In a planned broadcast to the nation, Lieutenant Colonel Dimka had cited corruption, indecision, arrest and detention without trial, weakness on the part of the Head of State and maladministration in general as the reasons for overthrowing the government. The coup was crushed several hours later by forces loyal to the government and Dimka fled to the premises of Radio Nigeria at Ikoyi where he had made a broadcast to the nation. He was eventually arrested in the company of a prostitute in Eastern Nigeria. Following a court martial, Lieutenant Colonel Dimka and another 38 military officers and civilians were executed by firing squad. The former military head of state, General Yakubu Gowon (who had been overthrown by General Muhammed in July 1975), was implicated in the abortive coup (by Dimka's testimony). The British Government refused to extradite Gowon. Years later, Gowon was granted an official pardon by civilian president Shehu Shagari and his rank (general) and other benefits were fully restored in 1987 by General Ibrahim Babangida. General Murtala Muhammed was succeeded by Lieutenant General Olusegun Obasanjo.

== Sources ==
- The Dimka's Coup Attempt of February 13, 1976
