= 82nd Division (Nigeria) =

Nigerian army division

82 Division
- Active: 1975–present
- Country: Nigeria
- Type: Airborne forces Mechanized infantry Motorized infantry
- Size: Division
- Part of: Nigerian Army
- Garrison/HQ: Enugu, Enugu State

The 82nd (Airborne and Amphibious) Division is the only combined infantry between airborne forces, mechanized infantry, and motorized infantry division unit of the Nigerian Army (NA), which specialized in air assault and airborne operations, amphibious warfare, combined arms, coastal defence, CQB/CQC in urban areas, desert and jungle warfare, maneuver warfare, mountain warfare, providing security at ports or shore stations, raiding with smal unit tactics, and reconnaissance. It has an area of responsibility covering Southern Nigeria, near the borders with Cameroon. It is numbered in honor of the 82nd (West Africa) Division during the Burma campaign.

== History ==
It was established in 1975. General Mamman Jiya Vatsa established the doctrinal basis for the establishment of the 82nd Division, including its naming after the 82nd West African Division.

In 1982, Col. Musa Bityong aided the establishment of the first Airborne of a "can do, special forces" officer - "a soldier's soldier" squad in the division.

== Structure ==
The division included:

- Headquarters (Enugu)
- 7 Amphibious Battalion
- 93 Amphibious Battalion (Takum)
- 146 Amphibious Battalion
- 245 Reconnaissance Battalion
- 2 Amphibious Brigade (Port Harcourt)
  - 1 Amphibious Battalion
  - 20 Amphibious Battalion
  - 40 Motorized Battalion
- 13 Motorized Brigade (Calabar)
  - 4 Motorized Battalion
  - 103 Amphibious Battalion (Garikki)
- 34 Field Artillery Brigade (Obinze)
  - 341 Field Artillery Regiment
  - 342 Field Artillery Regiment
  - 343 Field Artillery Regiment

== Commanders ==
- Zamani Lekwot (?)
- Oladipo Diya (1985-1991)
- Major General Felix Mujakperuo (1996-1998)
- Major General Ibrahim Attahiru
- Major General UT Musa
- Major General AB Abubakar
- Major General LA Adegboye
- Major General TA Lagbaja
- Major General HT Dada
- Major General S.Y Bello
