= Alfred Aduloju =

Nigerian Army officer

Alfred Aduloju (23 April 1939 – 1 January 2007) was a Nigerian Army major general who served as commanding officer of a number of Nigerian Army divisions and Commandant of the Nigerian Armed Forces Command and Staff College. He was also one of the principal actors in the 29 July 1975 coup that ousted then military head of state, General Yakubu Gowon.

== Education ==
Aduloju was from Ikare Akoko in Ondo State, attended Victory College, Ikare and enlisted in the Nigerian Army in 1962 through the Nigerian Military Training College where he was peers with officers such as Muhammadu Buhari, Zamani Lekwot, and Shehu Musa Yar'Adua. He also attended the Royal Canadian School of Signals, Kingston Ontario and the National Institute for Policy and Strategic Studies.

== Career ==
Aduloju was the General Officer Commanding (GOC) of the Nigerian Army's 1st Division from January 1981 to August 1983, GOC of the Nigerian Army's 82 Division from August 1975 to May 1980, and Commandant of the Nigerian Armed Forces Command and Staff College from September 1983 to January 1984.

== Participation in the July 1975 Coup ==
Then Lieutenant Colonel Aduloju was among a group of Colonels including Ibrahim Taiwo, Joseph Garba, Abdulahi Mohammed and Lt-Colonels Shehu Musa Yar'Adua, Ibrahim Babangida and Muhammadu Buhari who overthrew the Head of State, General Yakubu Gowon.
