= MT Heroic Idun incident =

Maritime detention incident in Nigeria

The MT Heroic Idun incident refers to the August 2022 to May 2023 arrest and nearly nine-month detention of the Marshall Islands-flagged Very Large Crude Carrier (VLCC) Heroic Idun and its 26 crew members. The incident followed the vessel's alleged unauthorized entry into Nigeria's Akpo oilfield, suspected attempted crude oil theft, and the raising of a international piracy alarm by the crew against a Nigerian Navy vessel that failed to properly identify itself.

The incident began on 7–8 August 2022 when the vessel allegedly entered the restricted Akpo oilfield without approval from the Nigerian National Petroleum Corporation (NNPC). After a confrontation with the Nigerian Navy, the vessel fled to the Exclusive Economic Zone (EEZ) of São Tomé and Príncipe, where it was illegally intercepted by authorities from Equatorial Guinea on 12 August 2022 under the regional "Yaoundé Architecture" security framework.

Following a transfer to Nigerian custody in November 2022, the case was resolved in May 2023 through a plea bargain. The owners, Idun Maritime Ltd, paid $15 million in restitution and a fine, and issued a public apology for the false piracy alarm. The vessel and crew were subsequently released.

== Background ==
=== Vessel specifications ===
The MT Heroic Idun is a Very Large Crude Carrier (VLCC) built in 2020 and registered in the Marshall Islands. It has an IMO number of 9858058, a deadweight tonnage (DWT) of 299,995 tonnes, and a gross tonnage of 156,237 tonnes. The ship measures 336 metres in length overall and 60 metres in beam.

=== Ownership and crew ===
The vessel is owned by Idun Maritime Limited, a company based in the Isle of Man. Technical management was handled by OSM Ship Management AS. During the incident, the vessel carried a crew of 26, including 16 Indian nationals, alongside Sri Lankan, Filipino, and Polish sailors.

== The incident ==
=== Unauthorized entry into Akpo oilfield ===
On 7 August 2022, the Heroic Idun entered the Akpo oilfield within Nigeria's EEZ. According to Nigerian authorities, the vessel entered the restricted zone without clearance from the NNPC or the Nigerian Upstream Petroleum Regulatory Commission. The area is restricted for loading activities, and the vessel's presence was deemed suspicious as it lacked authorization to operate at the Akpo terminal.

=== Confrontation with Nigerian Navy ===
Shortly after midnight on 8 August 2022, the Nigerian Navy patrol ship NNS Gongola intercepted the Heroic Idun after it was detected by the "Falcon Eye" maritime surveillance system. The vessel resisted orders for inspection and fled toward the south, escaping Nigerian waters.

=== False piracy report ===
While evading the Nigerian Navy, the crew transmitted a distress signal to the International Maritime Bureau (IMB), claiming an attempted pirate attack occurring approximately 18.5 to 27.8 kilometres (10 to 15 nautical miles) from the Akpo field. The Navy refuted this claim, characterizing it as a deliberate misrepresentation of a legitimate law enforcement action.

== Arrest and detention ==
=== Equatorial Guinea (August – November 2022) ===
On 12 August 2022, the Equatorial Guinean Navy intercepted the tanker in the São Tomé and Príncipe EEZ. Under the threat of force, the vessel was escorted to Luba Anchorage off Bioko Island. The crew was held for three months, with 15 members disembarked and detained in Malabo. During this time, the owners paid a fine of approximately €2 million to Equatorial Guinea for illegal entry into their waters, yet the vessel remained detained.

=== Transfer to Nigeria (November 2022 – May 2023) ===
On 6 November 2022, Equatorial Guinea handed the vessel and crew over to Nigeria. They were held at the Bonny anchorage under armed guard while legal proceedings commenced at the Federal High Court in Port Harcourt. Crew welfare reportedly deteriorated during this period, with instances of malaria, typhoid, and psychological distress.

== Legal proceedings ==
=== Nigerian charges ===
The Nigerian government indicted the vessel and crew on three counts under the Suppression of Piracy and Other Maritime Offences (SPOMO) Act, 2019. The charges included attempting to export crude oil without authorization, disobeying naval orders, and raising a false piracy alarm.

=== ITLOS prompt release case ===
On 10 November 2022, the Marshall Islands filed an application for the prompt release of the vessel and crew at the International Tribunal for the Law of the Sea (ITLOS) against Equatorial Guinea. However, because the vessel was illegally transferred to Nigeria the following day, the proceedings were discontinued on 15 November 2022.

== Resolution ==
=== Plea bargain and release ===
In April 2023, a plea bargain was reached between Idun Maritime Ltd and Nigerian authorities. The vessel was forced to plead guilty to unauthorized entry, and in exchange, all charges against the 26 individual crew members were dropped.

The terms of the settlement included:

- A restitution payment of $15 million to the Nigerian government.
- A court fine of N5 million ($10,841).
- A formal public apology published in Lloyd's List and Nigerian newspapers.
- The crew was repatriated in June 2023, and the vessel finally departed Nigerian waters on 6 July 2023.

== Aftermath and implications ==
=== Insurance and maritime law ===
The case highlighted significant gaps in war risk insurance. Insurers generally denied coverage because the detention resulted from governmental law enforcement actions regarding alleged local violations rather than acts of piracy or war.
