= Ibrahim Taiwo =

Military governor of Kwara State from 1975-1976

Colonel Ibrahim Taiwo

Governor of Kwara State
- In office July 1975 – 13 February 1976
- Preceded by: David Bamigboye
- Succeeded by: George Agbazika Innih

Personal details
- Born: Wushishi, Niger State
- Died: 13 February 1976

Military service
- Allegiance: Nigeria
- Branch/service: Nigerian Army
- Rank: Colonel

Ibrahim Taiwo (died 13 February 1976) was a military governor of Kwara State from July 1975 to February 1976 during the military regime of General Murtala Mohammed. He assisted in the establishment of the University of Ilorin, which was founded by decree in August 1975.

== Life ==
Taiwo was born in Wushishi, Niger State to Adeosun and Emily Taiwo. He was brought up in Kagara and was sometimes called Ibrahim Kagara while he was in school. Taiwo's father was of Ogbomosho ancestry. Ibrahim Taiwo was educated at Senior Primary School, Minna, Bida Middle School, and briefly attended the Provincial Secondary School, Okene, for his Higher School Certificate.

=== Military career ===
Taiwo joined the military in 1961. He started military training at the Nigerian Military Training College, Kaduna and also attended Mons Officer Cadet School, Aldershot. While in the army, he served as a mechanical transport officer, officer commanding 2 Brigade Transport in Apapa, staff captain, Army headquarters, Lagos, officer in charge of 8 Brigade, Asaba and later officer in charge of the transport company, Kaduna. During the Civil War, he was head of the transport and supplies division of the Nigerian Army.

==== Participation in the Nigerian counter-coup of July 1966 ====
Taiwo, then a captain with the Lagos Garrison in Yaba, was one of the many officers (including 2nd Lieutenant Sani Abacha, Lieutenant Muhammadu Buhari, Lieutenant Ibrahim Bako, Lieutenant Colonel Murtala Muhammed and Major Theophilus Danjuma) who staged what became known as the Nigerian counter-coup of 1966 because of grievances they felt towards the administration of General Aguiyi Ironsi's government, which quelled the 15 January 1966 coup.

==== Participation in the Nigerian Military Coup of 1975 ====
Taiwo played a central role in the coup that ousted Yakubu Gowon and brought Murtala Mohammed to power, under cover of his supply and transport duties in the army, working closely with Lieutenant Colonel Muhammadu Buhari.

==== Casualty of the 1976 Military Coup ====
Taiwo was the military governor of Kwara State during the failed coup of 13 February 1976, in which the then head of state, General Murtala Mohammed, was assassinated. Ibrahim Taiwo was also killed by the coup plotters because of his alliance with the late head of state. General Olusegun Obasanjo was later appointed as head of state, keeping the rest of General Murtala Mohammed's chain of command in place.
