= Olayinka Olusola Omigbodun =

Professor of psychiatry

Olayinka Olushola Omigbodun
- Born: Olayinka Olushola Banjo
- Education: College of Medicine, University of Ibadan, Ibadan, Nigeria University of Manchester, Manchester The Nuffield Institute of Health, University of Leeds, Leeds
- Occupation: Medical Doctor Lecturer.
- Years active: 1985 - present
- Employer(s): University of Ibadan, Ibadan, Nigeria
- Spouse: Akinyinka Omigbodun (m)

Olayinka Olusola Omigbodun is the first Nigerian female professor of psychiatry. She is a Professor at the College of Medicine, University of Ibadan, Ibadan, Nigeria. She is also the first female provost of the College of Medicine, University of Ibadan.

== Early life and education ==
Olayinka is the daughter of the late Lt. Col Victor Banjo. She attended St. Louis Grammar School, located in the Mokola area of Ibadan and the International School Ibadan, located in the University of Ibadan (UI) for her Ordinary and Advanced Levels. She began her career in Child and Adolescent Psychiatry and mental health in 1986 at the University College Hospital (UCH), Ibadan. She had further residency training first in General Psychiatry, and then Child and Adolescent Psychiatry at the Lancaster Moor Hospital, Lancaster, and the Queen’s Park Hospital, Blackburn, in the United Kingdom. Olayinka also had training in Family Therapy at the Department of Family Studies, University of Pennsylvania, Philadelphia, and was also a visiting scholar at the University of Pennsylvania's Bipolar Research Unit. She studied at the Nuffield Institute for Health, University of Leeds where she had her Masters in Public Health in 1999, through the University of Ibadan MacArthur Foundation-funded Staff Development Programme. She furthered her studies in Child and Adolescent Psychiatry at the Greenwood Institute for Child Health, University of Leicester, UK in 2004.

== Employments and positions ==
- She is a professor at the College of Medicine, University of Ibadan, Ibadan, Nigeria
- She is also a consultant and head of the Department of Child and Adolescent Psychiatry, University College Hospital, Ibadan, Nigeria

== Publications (articles and journals) ==
Olayinka has written numerous articles for both local and international journals. Some of which are:

- Omigbodun O.O., Gureje O., Gater R., Ikuesan B. A., Adebayo E. (1996) Psychiatric Morbidity in a Nigerian Paediatric Primary Care Service: A Comparison of Two Screening Instruments. Social Psychiatry and Psychiatric Epidemiology, Vol 31, No 3/4, 186-193
- Omigbodun, O.O., Adebayo, E. and Gureje, O. (1999) Detection of Childhood Mental Health Problems by Doctors working in a Primary Care Service. Nigerian Postgraduate Medical Journal, Vol 6, 1, 1-4.
- Omigbodun O.O. (2001) A cost-effective model for increasing access to mental health care at the primary care level in Nigeria. The Journal of Mental Health Policy and Economics Vol 4, No 3, 133-139
- Omigbodun O.O. (2003) Mental health services for children in Nigeria. Where should the focus be? Archives of Ibadan Medicine, Vol 4. No 1, 12
- Omigbodun O.O, Gureje O. (2004) Factor Analysis of the Children’s Behaviour Questionnaire (Rutter Scale A2) in a Nigerian Paediatric Primary Care Population. South African Journal of Psychiatry Vol 10. No 1, 17-20
- Omigbodun O.O., Bella T T (2004) Obstetric risk factors and subsequent mental health problems in a child and adolescent clinic population in Nigeria. Tropical Journal of Obstetrics and Gynaecology, Vol 21. No 1: 15-20
- Omigbodun O. O..(2004) Psychosocial issues in a child and adolescent psychiatric clinic population in Nigeria. Social Psychiatry and Psychiatric Epidemiology Vol 39 No 8, 667-72
- Omigbodun O. O., Omigbodun A. O. (2004) Unmet need for sexuality education among adolescent girls in Southwest Nigeria: A qualitative analysis. African Journal of Reproductive Health.Vol 8. No 3, 27-37
- Omigbodun O. O., Onibokun A.,.Yusuf O B. Odukogbe AA, Omigbodun A O. (2004) Stressors and counseling needs of undergraduate nurses in Ibadan, Nigeria. Journal of Nursing Education. Vol 43. No 9, 412-5
- Omigbodun O. O., Babalola O.(2004) Psychosocial dynamics of psychoactive substance misuse among Nigerian adolescents. Annals of African Medicine Vol 3. No 3, 111-115
- Omigbodun AO, Omigbodun OO. (2004) Medical Audit: A veritable tool for improving standards in clinical practice. Annals of African Medicine, 3 (3):146-149
- Omigbodun OO (2006) Psychosocial attributes of orphaned youths in Ibadan Metropolis: Implications for reproductive health Tropical Journal of Obstetrics and Gynaecology, Vol 23. No 1: 54-62
- Omigbodun O.O., Odukogbe A.A., Omigbodun A.O., Yusuf O.B., Bella T.T., Olayemi O. (2006) Stressors and Psychological Symptoms in Students of Medicine and Allied Health Professions in Nigeria. Social Psychiatry and Psychiatric Epidemiology, 40:1-7
- Omigbodun O., Bella T., Dogra N., Simoyan O., (2007) Training Health Professionals for Child and Adolescent Mental Health Care in Nigeria: A Qualitative Analysis. Child and Adolescent Mental Health 12 (3): 132-135.
- Obindo J. T,. Omigbodun OO., (2007) The validation of Edinburgh Postpartum Depressions Scale (EPDS) in North Central Nigeria. Journal of Medicine in the Tropics. Vol 9 (2): 29-40
