= Albert Okonkwo =

Albert Nwazu Okonkwo

Governor of the Republic of Benin
- In office 19 September 1967 – 20 September 1967
- Preceded by: Office established
- Succeeded by: Office abolished

Administrator of Mid-Western Region
- In office 17 August 1967 – 20 September 1967
- Preceded by: David Ejoor
- Succeeded by: Samuel Ogbemudia

Military service
- Allegiance: Nigeria (until 1967); (Republic of Biafra) Biafra (1967–1970); Republic of Benin (1967)
- Years of service: 1960s–1970
- Battles/wars: Nigerian Civil War; Midwest Invasion of 1967

Albert Nwazu Okonkwo (//) was a Nigerian military officer and later a Major in the Biafran Army Medical Corps during the Nigerian Civil War. He is known for being the brief Military Administrator of the Mid-Western State of Nigeria during the Mid-West invasion in the early phase of the civil war. He was a trained as physician in the United States, and was married to an American.

== Life ==
Okonkwo was a military doctor and the commanding officer of the Nigerian Armed Forces Medical Service in Benin City right before the Civil War. At the onset of the war, he became one of the top ranked rebel commanders in the Mid-West region that later became briefly known as Republic of Benin by rebel leaders.

On 9 August 1967, a force of 3,000 Biafran troops crossed the Niger bridge, with one group making a dash for Benin City. On 14 August the Biafran command in Enugu announced that Major Okonkwo had been appointed Military Administrator of the Mid-Western Region. The new administration faced resistance from several segments of the population. Morale was poor. The Liberation Army commander, a Yoruba colonel named Victor Banjo, and three majors were later discovered to have been negotiating with the Nigerian army, were tried for high treason and executed by firing squad in Enugu.

The Nigerian Army regrouped and advanced towards Benin city under the leadership of Colonel Murtala Mohammed, recapturing the city on 20 September 1967. The day before, Okonkwo had been declared Governor of the "autonomous, independent and sovereign republic of Benin". In his broadcast declaring the independent Republic of Benin, Okonkwo belatedly tried to rally non-Igbo groups. After the city fell, Okonkwo was thought to have fled to Igbo areas near Ubiaja.
