= South Atlantic Petroleum =

- Trade name: SAPETRO
- Headquarters: Nigeria
- Key people: General Theophilus Danjuma (chairman)
- Website: sapetro.com

South Atlantic Petroleum, also known as SAPETRO, is a Nigerian oil and gas exploration and production company which has a share in the development of the Akpo deepwater field off the coast of Port Harcourt. Its chairman is Theophilus Danjuma.
