= Dodan Barracks =

Official residence of military head of state in Nigeria during 1966-1979

Coordinates: 6°26′58″N 3°25′1″E

Dodan Barracks is a military barrack located in Ikoyi, Lagos, Nigeria. The barrack was the Supreme Military Headquarters during the Nigerian Civil War and from 1966 to 1979 and 1983 to 1985, Dodan Barracks was the official residence of the military heads of state of the Nigerian military juntas of 1966–79 and 1983–99, and also the Supreme Military Headquarters from 1966 until the move to Abuja in 1991.

== Name ==
The name "Dodan" originated from the site of a battle fought during the Burma campaign of World War II by the 81st West African Division.

== Military headquarters ==
Dodan Barracks was one of the bases of a group of Nigerian Army majors who overthrew the First Nigerian Republic in January 1966. The coup was suppressed by the army whose commander, Major General Johnson Aguiyi-Ironsi, then became head of state. In July 1966, Dodan Barracks became the seat of power in Nigeria after a counter-coup in which Ironsi was killed and his chief of staff, General Yakubu Gowon was made head of state, moving into the Federal Guard officer's mess. The Barracks was the location where Gowon received the formal Biafran surrender at the end of the Nigerian Civil War in January 1970. Subsequent rulers kept their base at the barracks for the next quarter of a century.

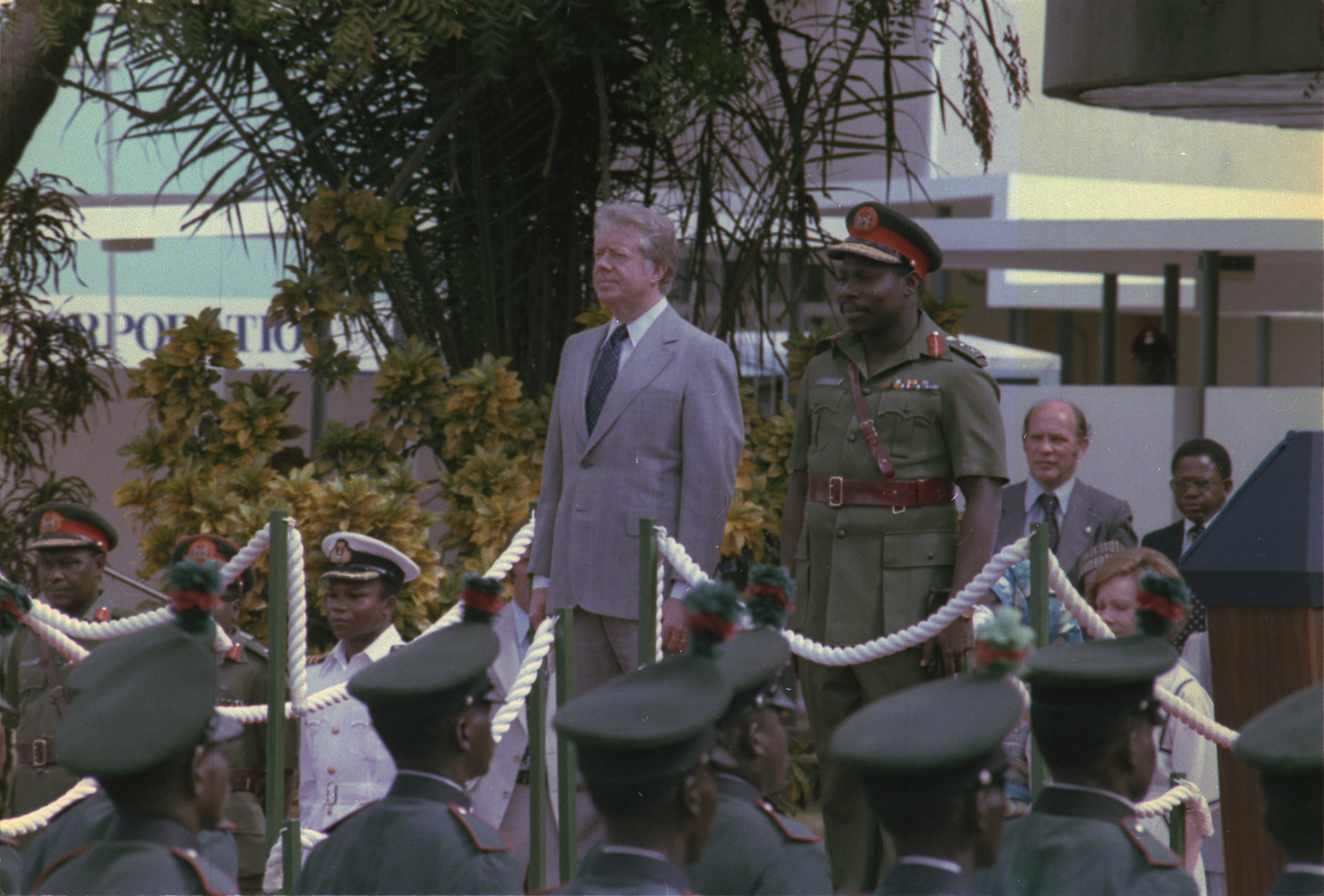
Jimmy Carter and Lt. Gen. Olusegun Obasanjo at the welcoming ceremony for President Carter's visit to Nigeria: 04/01/1978

Gowon was overthrown in a July 1975 coup, succeeded by General Murtala Mohammed. In an attempted coup in February 1976, Murtala was killed when his convoy was ambushed. Obasanjo moved into the barracks for security reasons.

In 1977, troops invaded the compound of musician Fela Kuti, called the father of Afrobeat, who was critical of the military regime. They beat up the men, raped the women and threw Fela into detention. His 78-year-old mother died later of injuries from being thrown from a second story window. On his release, he recorded an album titled Coffin For Head of State. Fela and his supporters marched his mother's empty coffin to Dodan Barracks and left it there to shame Obasanjo.

The Dodan Barracks was the location for a meeting in April 1978 between US President Jimmy Carter and Olusegun Obasanjo.

In the successful December 1983 coup, when General Muhammadu Buhari seized power from President Shehu Shagari, the troops in the barracks initially resisted, only to yield the day after. A palace coup in August 1985 orchestrated by General Ibrahim Babangida, seized power from under Buhari. In January 1986, a Special Military Tribunal was established to try suspects accused of plotting to overthrow General Babangida. The tribunal conducted the trial at the Dodan Barracks, finding 17 of the defendants guilty of treason.

Dodan Barracks was one of the key locations seized in the April 1990 coup attempt by Major Gideon Orkar against General Ibrahim Babangida. Babangida was resident when the barracks were attacked, but escaped by a back route. The guards thwarted the coup attempt, losing five members in defence of Dodan Barracks. Babangida's wife, Maryam, who was also present with her children at the time of the coup attempt, recalled that when she moved into the barracks in 1985 she had to arrange for considerable renovations to make the rooms more suitable for formal receptions.

== Civilian rule ==
After the move of army headquarters to Abuja in 1991, and the resumption of civilian power in 1999, funding for maintenance of the barracks was greatly reduced. By late 2003 the grounds were dirty and unkempt, sewage was leaking from broken pipes, the walls of some buildings were cracked and most were abandoned. In 2004 the then civilian President Olusegun Obasanjo - as a gesture of a departure from past military dictatorship finally ordered Dodan Barracks and all other military barracks not in use across the country be handed over to the country's Police Force.

In August 2006, the Lagos Environment and Sanitation Network identified a heavily polluted drainage channel in the Obalende mammy market, behind the State House and Dodan Barracks. An August 2007 analysis found the water was heavily contaminated with faecal material. People living and working in the market, Dodan Barracks and the State House were at risk from diseases such as typhoid fever, diarrhoea, dysentery and cholera. In January 2009, it was reported that President Umaru Yar'Adua would spend part of his vacation at the barracks.
