= Republic of Benin (1967) =

Former country in West Africa

Coordinates: 6°19′N 5°37′W

- 1967
- Motto: "Unity and Strength"
- Location of the Republic of Benin in red, with Biafra in striped red and Nigeria in dark gray.
- Status: Puppet state of Biafra
- Capital: Benin City
- Common languages: English (official) · Edo · Igbo · Ijaw · Urhobo
- Government: Republic
- Governor
  - 1967: Albert Nwazu Okonkwo
- Historical era: Nigerian Civil War
  - Established: 19 September 1967
  - Disestablished: 20 September 1967

Population
  - 1967: approx. 3,000,000
- Currency: Biafran pound Nigerian pound
Preceded by	Succeeded by
Biafra	Nigeria

The Republic of Benin (Igbo: Ripọblik du Benin) was a short-lived unrecognised secessionist state in West Africa that existed for seven hours in 1967. It was established on 19 September 1967 during the Nigerian Civil War as a puppet state of Biafra, following its occupation of Nigeria's Mid-Western Region, and named after its capital, Benin City, with Albert Nwazu Okonkwo as its head of government.

The new state was an attempt by Biafra to prevent non-Igbo residents of the neighbouring Mid-Western Region from siding with Nigeria following regional ethnic tensions early in the war. The Republic of Benin was officially declared even as the Nigerian federal forces were reconquering the region and ended the following day as they entered Benin City. The occupation of the Mid-Western Region turned residents against the secessionist cause and was used by the Nigerian government as justification to escalate the war against Biafra.

== Background and prelude ==
In the lead-up to the Nigerian Civil War, residents of the ethnically diverse Mid-Western Region attempted to take a neutral position. Shortly before Biafra announced its secession from Nigeria, leaders in the Mid-Western Region sponsored a peace conference near Benin City, and officials refused to permit Nigerian federal troops to invade Biafra through the region. In August 1967, Biafran forces occupied the Mid-Western Region and took control of the regional government, with American-educated doctor Albert Okonkwo as the new head of government under the title governor. Initially, the Igbo population welcomed Biafran control, while non-Igbos generally were unhappy but decided to wait for the restoration of federal control rather than resist. Initial relations between the new administration and non-Igbos were peaceful but uneasy. To improve relations, Okonkwo's administration saturated homes and streets with news from the Biafran position. However, the mass media campaign began to fill the state with news about the oppression of the Igbo in Nigeria, and as the days passed, only increased the region's ethnic divide. The endless public relations campaign destroyed non-Igbo sympathy for the pro-Biafran secessionist cause instead of converting them to outright support, with most adopting neutral or pro-Nigerian sympathies.

As relations between the occupational government and non-Igbos continued to deteriorate, Biafran President C. Odumegwu Ojukwu visited the Mid-Western Region to raise support and met with leaders of the previously banned National Convention of Nigerian Citizens (NCNC). Although the visit prompted increased support among former NCNC partisans, their former intra-party discord reawakened. At the same time NCNC partisans began to clash with supporters of other parties. The non-Igbo rejection of the invasion was solidified. As Okonkwo's administration continued to lose the support of the Mid-Western Region's populace, they became desperate.

== Proclamation ==
On 19 September 1967, the Biafrans rebranded the region by proclaiming the Republic of Benin, an independent state separate from Biafra, as a last-ditch effort. It was believed that even if it could not win non-Igbo support, the new state might at least physically divide Biafra from the Nigerian federal forces. Citing the deaths of Mid-Western residents in the northern riots and the region's antebellum support for a confederate government in Nigeria, Okonkwo declared that the Republic of Benin would support Biafra in all causes and would participate in organisations such as the Commonwealth of Nations and the Organisation of African Unity. However, Okonkwo and other officials had discussed an independence declaration two weeks earlier on 5 September without coming to an agreement, and the announcement was recorded in a short lull as he and his military forces retreated in the face of a federal government military advance.

Later in the same day, government troops reached Benin City, the Republic of Benin's capital city, and the British high commissioner reported crowds lining the streets to celebrate the reconquest. Meanwhile, Biafran President Ojukwu offered no comment on the declaration, concentrating instead on Biafran soldiers' failure to stop the government's advance. Biafra had won limited recognition from some foreign states, but all gains were unrelated to the proclamation of Benin. The Biafran occupation of the Mid-Western Region failed to achieve its objectives and severely damaged domestic support for the secessionist cause among non-Igbos, and was perceived by the Nigerian federal government as justification to escalate the minor conflict into full-fledged war.

== See also ==
- List of historical unrecognized states and dependencies
- Puppet state
