= 1966 Nigerian counter-coup =

2nd coup in Nigeria in 1966

Date	28 July – 1 August 1966
Location	Nigeria
Result	Coup successful: End of the Ironsi regime; Elimination of many Igbo soldiers and officers; Finalisation of Northern dominance of the Nigerian Army; Yakubu Gowon appointed Head of State; 1966 anti-Igbo pogrom Intensifies; Rift between the Eastern Region Government and the Federal Military Government

Belligerents
Supreme Military Council of Nigeria	Northern Army Officers

Commanders and leaders
Johnson Aguiyi-Ironsi †; Adekunle Fajuyi †	Murtala Muhammed; Joseph Akahan; Theophilus Danjuma; Martin Adamu

Strength
Unknown	Unknown

Casualties and losses
300 dead	None

The 1966 Nigerian counter-coup (also known as the "July Rematch") was the second of many military coups in Nigeria. It was masterminded by Lt. Colonel Murtala Muhammed and many other northern military officers. The coup began as a mutiny at roughly midnight of 28 July 1966 and was a reaction to the killings of Northern politicians and officers by some soldiers on 15 January 1966 (see 1966 Nigerian coup d'état). The coup resulted in the murder of Nigeria's first military Head of State General Johnson Aguiyi-Ironsi and Lt Colonel Adekunle Fajuyi (who was hosting a visiting Aguiyi-Ironsi) in Ibadan by disgruntled northern non-commissioned officers (NCOs). Upon the termination of Ironsi's government, Lt. Colonel Yakubu Gowon was appointed Head of State by the coup conspirators.

== Reasons for the counter-coup ==
According to historian, Max Siollun northern soldiers had a list of grievances following the aborted 15 January 1966, coup which led to the planning of the counter-coup. A list of their grievances were:

- The murder of northern civilian leaders and military officers in the aborted 15 January 1966, coup d'etat
- The 15 January 1966, coup conspirators (mostly Majors) had not been tried for treason and were being paid while in detention.
- The passage of the Unification Decree.
- Rumors of an "Igbo coup" to eliminate northern soldiers.
- The promotion of several Igbo Majors to Lt. Colonel.
- Rumors of General Aguiyi-Ironsi's ethnic favoritism toward Igbos.
- Plans to swap the 1st and 4th battalions and plans to rotate the military governors of the different regions.

== Coup participants ==
The principal coup plotters were:

- Lt. Colonel Joseph Akahan (Commander, 4th Battalion Ibadan)
- Lt. Colonel Murtala Muhammed (Inspector of Signals, Lagos)
- Major Theophilus Danjuma (Principal Staff Officer, Army HQ, Lagos)
- Major Abba Kyari (Artillery, Kaduna)
- Major Martin Adamu (2nd Battalion Lagos)
- Major Shittu Alao (Nigerian Airforce HQ, Lagos)
- Major Musa Usman (Nigerian Air Force, Lagos)
- Captain Joseph Garba (Federal Guards Lagos)
- Captain Isa Bukar (Federal Guards Lagos)
- Captain Ibrahim Taiwo (Lagos Garrison Yaba)
- Captain Baba Usman GSO (Grade II, Army HQ, Lagos)
- Captain Abdul D.S. Wya (3rd Battalion, Kaduna)
- Lieutenant Muhammadu Buhari (2 Brigade Lagos)
- Lieutenant Ibrahim Babangida (1st Reconnaissance Squadron, Kaduna)
- Lieutenant Ibrahim Bako (4th Battalion, Ibadan)
- Lieutenant William Walbe (2nd Battalion, Lagos)
- Lieutenant Mamman Vatsa (4th Battalion, Ibadan)
- Lieutenant Buka Suka Dimka (Nigerian Military Training College Kaduna)
- Lieutenant Yakubu Dambo (3rd Battalion Kaduna)
- Lieutenant Garba A. Dada (Adjutant 4th Battalion Ibadan)
- Lieutenant Garba Duba (1 Reconnaissance Squadron Kaduna)
- Lieutenant Mohammed Balarabe Haladu (4th Battalion, Ibadan)
- Lieutenant Malami Mahe Nassarawa (2nd Battalion, Lagos)
- Lieutenant James Onoja (4th Battalion, Ibadan)
- Lieutenant Abdulahhi Shelleng (Company Commander, 4th Battalion, Ibadan)
- Lieutenant Paul Chabri Tarfa (Federal Guards, Lagos)
- Lieutenant Alfred Gom (2nd Battalion, Lagos)
- Lieutenant Nuhu Nathan
- Lieutenant Jonathan Longboem
- Lieutenant D.S. Abubakar (Abeokuta Garrison)
- Second Lieutenant Sani Abacha (3rd Battalion Kaduna)
- Second Lieutenant Muhammadu Gado Nasko (Artillery, Kaduna)
- Sergeant Paul Dickson
- Sergeant Sabo Kwale (Abeokuta Garrison)
- Corporal Alimi Faheem (2nd Reconnaissance Squadron, Abeokuta)

== See also ==
- 1966 anti-Igbo pogrom
- Military history of Nigeria
