= Mammy market =

Type of market in Nigeria

In Nigeria, the term mammy market refers to a market located next to military barracks and National Youth Service Corps (NYSC) camps to sell food and other provisions for soldiers and NYSC members, with civilians nearby often patronising them as well.

The origin of mammy markets is often credited to "Mammy" Maria Ochefu, then the wife of soldier and later military governor Anthony Ochefu, who had started a business to sell a drink known as kunu in Hausa or enyi in Idoma at his assignment in Enugu to supplement the family's income. Initially, the process to make the drink attracted flied to the barracks and she was forced to stop; however, due to high demand from soldiers and other residents, base personnel allocated a stall for her to make and sell the drink. As she moved with her husband to different assignment across the country, she went on to create similar establishments at various bases. She stated these stalls were the foundations of the "mammy markets", reportedly named after her, and claimed to have met future military heads of state Yakubu Gowon and Muhammadu Buhari while selling her wares. Ochefu died at the age of 86 on 18 March 2025.

Mammy markets are relatively popular in Nigeria among both soldiers/NSYC members on their compounds and civilians living near the bases, with a major draw being the safety of the markets due to their military protection. Sellers, often women who live on the barracks, enjoy lower operating costs and better infrastructure compared to outside venues. Meanwhile, buyers patronise the markets for cheaper prices and better quality.
