= Akintunde Akinsehinwa =

Nigerian aide-de-camp (1944-1976)

- Born: 11 November 1944; Ondo, Southern Region, British Nigeria (now Ondo, Ondo State, Nigeria)
- Died: 13 February 1976 (aged 31) Lagos, Nigeria
- Allegiance: Nigeria
- Branch: Nigerian Army
- Service years: 1967–1976
- Rank: Lieutenant
- Conflicts: Nigerian Civil War

Lieutenant Akintunde Akinsehinwa (11 November 1944 – 13 February 1976) was a Nigerian military officer and the aide-de-camp to Murtala Ramat Muhammed, the military ruler (head of state) of Nigeria from 1975 to 1976. He was killed alongside Muhammed during the February 1976 coup.

== Early life ==
Akintunde Akinsehinwa was born in Ondo City in Ondo State, Nigeria on 11 November 1944. He started his early education in Owo and finished his secondary school education at Edopkolo Secondary School in Benin City, Nigeria where he obtained his Secondary School Leaving Certificate (WASC) in 1963. Upon completion of his studies Akinsehinwa moved to Ibadan in the western province of Nigeria where he worked as a clerk at the High Court.

== Military career ==
At the commencement of the Nigerian Civil War in 1967, Akintunde Akinsehinwa was recruited by the Nigerian Army and trained as an officer cadet at the Nigerian Army School of Infantry in Jaji, Kaduna State. After six months of training, Akinsehinwa was commissioned by the Army as a second lieutenant and sent to the war front to join the famous 3rd Marine Commando Division (3MCDO) under the stewardship of "The Black Scorpion" – Colonel Benjamin Adekunle, where he participated in military offensive efforts on the Calabar front to quell the secession of the Biafran separatist movement.

After the war ended in 1970, Akinsehinwa chose to undergo further military training by taking Signal Officers Courses. Upon completion of his training he was promoted to rank of Lieutenant and posted to Arakan Signals Barracks in Apapa, Lagos, Nigeria as an officer of the Nigerian Army Signal Corps. While at Arakan, he was appointed as a staff officer to then Brigadier General Muhammed who was brigade commander of signals at the time. Brigadier General Muhammed was soon appointed as Minister of Communications by the Yakubu Gowon regime and took Akinsehinwa along with him as a personnel staff officer and technical assistant. On July 29, 1975, General Muhammed was made head of state (succeeding Gowon) by younger soldiers who wanted to ensure Nigeria's return to democratic rule. He was not directly involved in the coup d'état that brought him to power, but he had played a prominent role in rallying northern officers behind the July 1966 coup that felled Aguiyi-Ironsi.

Upon becoming Head of State, Murtala appointed Akinsehinwa as his Aide-de-Camp (a role usually reserved for a senior officer such as a Lieutenant Colonel or Colonel). Muhammed citing Akinsehinwa's hard work, wit and intelligence, appointed Akinsehinwa as Aide-de-Camp effectively making him the youngest (Age – 30) and lowest ranking presidential Aide-de-Camp in Nigerian history. In a short time, Muhammed's policies won him broad popular support, and his decisiveness elevated him to the status of a national hero.

== Death ==
On 13 February 1976, General Muhammed's motorcade was ambushed in Lagos by coup plotters and assassins amid an abortive coup d'état. The coup plotters unleashed a hail of bullets on Muhammed's black Mercedes Benz limousine (not bulletproof) killing him instantly. Muhammed's driver and orderly were also killed instantly. However, Akinsehinwa survived the initial barrage of bullets and exited the limousine to return fire. Unfortunately, he was overpowered and eventually succumbed to a hail of bullets (an autopsy revealed six bullet wounds in his back). Akintunde Akinsehinwa at 31 years of age thus became the first aide-de-camp to die in the line of duty while serving a Nigerian head of state.
