= Ibrahim Bako =

Nigerian brigadier (1943–1983)

Brigadier Ibrahim Bako

Acting General Officer Commanding, 1 Division, Nigerian Army

Personal details
- Born: Ibrahim Ahmed Bako; 5 March 1943
- Died: 31 December 1983 (aged 40)
- Education: Nigerian Military Training College; RMA Sandhurst

Military service
- Allegiance: Nigeria
- Branch/service: Nigerian Army
- Years of service: 1962–1983
- Rank: Brigadier

Ibrahim Ahmed Bako (5 March 1943 – 31 December 1983) was a senior officer in the Nigerian Army who played a principal role in two Nigerian military coups: the July 1966 counter-coup and the December 1983 coup. The 1983 coup ousted the democratic government of Shehu Shagari while the July 1966 coup ousted the military government of General Ironsi. Bako was killed during the December 1983 coup d'état.

== Career ==
Ibrahim Ahmed Bako (N/548) FSS MSS psc Born on 5 March 1943 in Kaduna, Kaduna State. His primary education was at Junior Primary School, Kaduna from 1951 to 1954, later proceeding to Giwa Senior primary school to complete his primary education in 1956.

He attended Government College, now Barewa College from 1957 to 1961 where he obtained the West African School Certificate. On completion of his secondary education he gained admission into the Nigerian Military Training College (NMTC) Kaduna, now Nigeria Defence Academy as a member of NMTC course 5 in 1962 for his preliminary military training.

He later proceeded to the United Kingdom to complete his cadetship training at the Royal Military Academy Sandhurst. Regular Combatant Commission was granted on 17 December 1964 with the rank of Second Lieutenant and seniority of the same rank effective 19 April 1962.

As a Nigerian Army Infantry officer, Ibrahim Bako started his career as Platoon Commander 4 Battalion, then Company Commander 5 Battalion. At the start of the civil war in 1967, he was appointed Staff Captain intelligence for Headquarters 1 Area Command (later redesignated 1 Division). He was made a temporary Major on 31 July 1968 before taking a more active role at the front as a Brigade Major 4 Infantry Brigade, with the rank being made substantive on 24 February 1969.

He remained a Major until 1 October 1972 when he was afforded the temporary rank of Lieutenant Colonel and with it the duties of General Staff Officer Grade II Intelligence. Bako (then a Lt Colonel) served as a logistics officer on the National Census Board for the 1973 census. The Substantive rank of Lieutenant Colonel was officially granted 1 April 1974, this time his orders were to report as Commander 20 Brigade. As a Lieutenant Colonel, he also held the posts of Assistant Quarter Master at Headquarters Lagos Garrison Organisation (now 81 Division Lagos) and then Commander 1 Infantry Division Garrison, Kaduna.

On 1 November 1975, he was given the temporary rank of Colonel and by 5 July 1978 he was made a substantive Colonel and with it the new posting of General Staff Officer Grade 1 Coordination Army Headquarters. Colonel Bako led a Nigerian Battalion in peace keeping operations in Lebanon under UNIFIL, UN peacekeeping mission established on 19 March 1978 by United Nations Security Council Resolutions 425 and 426.

Ibrahim Bako attained the rank of Brigadier on 1 May 1980 serving as Commander 7 Mechanised Brigade and finally Director Army Faculty, Armed Forces Command and Staff College, Jaji before his death on 31 December 1983.

At a point in his career, Ibrahim Bako led the Nigerian Army contingent that facilitated the transfer of about 100 former guerrillas from the Zimbabwean bushes (after the liberation struggle) for selection and training at the Nigerian Defence Academy, Kaduna in 1980. Those 100 former guerrillas formed the pioneer corp of the post-independence Zimbabwe National Army, leading Nigeria's assistance to other Southern African countries like Angola and South Africa in their fight against apartheid and colonialism.

== Role on 28 July 1966 coup ==
The 28 July 1966 mutiny (often called the Nigerian counter-coup of 1966) was a violent overthrow of General Aguiyi-Ironsi's military government, which came into power after the abortive January 15 coup, spearheaded by Major Emmanuel Ifeajuna and Lt Col Kaduna Nzeogwu. A group of military officers of northern Nigerian origin (including then Lts Ibrahim Bako, Shehu Musa Yar'Adua, Theophilus Danjuma, Captain Joe Garba, Lt Col Murtala Muhammed, among others) conspired and mutinied against General Ironsi's military government. Among the casualties of the mutiny were General Aguiyi Ironsi and Lt Colonel Adekunle Fajuyi. During reconnaissance for the counter coup, then Lt Col Murtala Mohammed would drive to Ibadan (where Bako was stationed along with others like then Lt Jerry Useni), Muhammed would often drive into town from Lagos, pick up Ibrahim Bako and Abdullai Shelleng at a pre-arranged location and drive around without stopping while they discussed their counter-coup plan.

== Role on 31 December 1983 coup ==
Ibrahim Bako (then Director of the Army Faculty at the Armed Forces Command and staff College, Jaji) and acting GOC 1 Division, Kaduna, was requested by the coup conspirators with securing President Shehu Shagari presumably after Shagari's Brigade of Guards had been neutralized (without violence as planned) by Col Tunde Ogbeha. Author Max Siollun notes that Bako was chosen for the role because not only was Bako's father a personal friend to Shagari, as Commander 7 Mechanised Brigade Sokoto, he was well known and respected in the president's home state. Unknown to Bako was that the coup plot had been leaked to President Shagari, whose guards were on high alert. After arriving at the Presidential residence (in non-military attire) with an armed detachment to secure the President, Bako was shot dead while sitting in the passenger side of a Unimog utility truck in an ensuing firefight between troops from Bako's detachment and the Brigade of Guards soldiers under the command of Captain Augustine Anyogo. The Unimog utility truck that Bako was killed in was on display at the Nigerian Army Museum in Zaria, Nigeria.

The senior military officers involved in the 1983 coup were:

- Major General Muhammadu Buhari (General Officer Commanding, 3rd Armored Division, Jos)
- Major General Ibrahim Babangida (Director of Army Staff Duties and Plans)
- Brigadier Ibrahim Bako (Acting General Officer Commanding, 1st Division Kaduna/Director Army Faculty, Armed Forces Command and Staff College, Jaji)
- Brigadier Sani Abacha (Commander, 9th Mechanized Brigade)
- Brigadier Tunde Idiagbon (Military Secretary, Army)
- Lt Colonel Aliyu Mohammed Gusau (Director of Military Intelligence)
- Lt Colonel Halilu Akilu
- Lt Colonel David Mark
- Lt Colonel Tunde Ogbeha
- Major Sambo Dasuki (Military Assistant to the Chief of Army Staff, Lt-General Wushishi)
- Major Abdulmumini Aminu
- Major Lawan Gwadabe
- Major Mustapha Jokolo (Senior Instructor, Basawa Barracks - Zaria)
- Major Abubakar Umar

Major General Buhari's Supreme Military Council (SMC) observed a minute of silence for the slain Brigadier Bako during SMC's first meeting.
