= Ovu =

Town in Delta State, Nigeria

- Location within Nigeria
- Coordinates: 05°45′00″N 05°54′00″E
- Country: Nigeria
- State: Delta State

Ovu is a town in Southern Nigeria in Delta State and part of Agbon Kingdom and His Royal Majesty, Ogurime-Rime Ukori I is the current King and Ovie of Agbon Kingdom.

A railway line to the port of Warri stopped short at Ovu due to a dispute with the contractor building it. In 2009, agreement was reached to complete the 50 km line. Ovu is in Ethiope East Local Government of Delta State, Part of Old Western Region now in South-South Nigeria. The people of Ovu speak Urhobo language. Many prominent Nigerians have come from Ovu such as:

- Chief John Avwunuvherhi Okpodu a founding member, 1st Financial Secretary and 2nd president-general of Urhobo Progress Union (UPU)
- Chief T. E. A. Salubi
- Prof John Enaohwo
- Prof Patrick Igbigbi
- Etaghene praise who is a Nigerian independent freestyle cover artist
- Deacon Frederick Menukun Asini Okpodu who was an exemplary educator in his time.

Ovu comprises the following towns and villages: Ovu Inland, Oviorie, Ovwere, Okoemaka, Asoro, Okoroke, Urhodo, Ekpan, Okuloho, Okorekpagha and Okorokpokpor. Ovu Inland is 22.2 kilometres (13.8 miles) from the Osubi-Warri airport and the people of Ovu are very hard-working, entrepreneurial and innovative. The people of Ovu have a shrine called Ovughere where yearly festivals are conducted from and descendants of Ovu from all over the world visit and celebrate with families.

== See also ==
- Railway stations in Nigeria
- Agbon Kingdom
