= Victor Banjo =

Nigerian Army officer

- Born: Victor Adebukunola Banjo; 1 April 1930; British Nigeria
- Died: 22 September 1967 (aged 37); Biafra
- Spouse: Taiwo Banjo
- Children: Olayinka Omigbodun, née Banjo (daughter) + 3 others
- Relatives: Adetowun Ogunsheye (sister); Ademola Banjo (brother)
- Status: Deceased
- Convictions: being a coup plotter against Nigerian Prime Minister Abubakar Tafawa Balewa by the government of Aguyi Ironsi staging a coup plot against Biafran President Odumegwu Ojukwu
- Penalty: Death by firing squad
- Military career
- Alma mater: R.M.A. Sandhurst
- Allegiance: Nigeria; Biafra
- Branch: Nigerian Army
- Service years: 1953-1967
- Rank: Lieutenant Colonel
- Commands: 101st Division; 104th Division
- Conflicts: Nigerian Civil War

Victor Adebukunola Banjo (1 April 1930 – 22 September 1967) was a colonel in the Nigerian Army. He fought in the Biafran Army during the Nigerian Civil War. Banjo was accused of being a coup plotter against Nigerian Prime Minister Abubakar Tafawa Balewa by the government of Aguyi Ironsi. He was alleged to have staged a coup plot against Biafran President Emeka Ojukwu and was executed as a result. Ojukwu's first military judge stated that was not enough evidence to convict him of coup charges, but he was found guilty by a second military tribunal.

== Military career pre-1966 coup ==
Lieutenant Colonel Banjo was the first Nigerian Director of the Electrical and Mechanical Engineering Corps of the Nigerian Army. He joined the Army in 1953 as Warrant Officer 52 and he was the sixteenth Nigerian to be commissioned as an officer. A product of the Royal Military Academy Sandhurst, he also obtained a BSc in mechanical engineering.

== Arrest ==
His travails began after the 15 January 1966 coup, which brought Major-General Johnson Aguiyi-Ironsi to power. Three days after Aguiyi-Ironsi came to power, Banjo was summoned to the office of the Supreme Military Commander and was arrested while he was still waiting to see the head of state. Banjo, a Yoruba, attempted to defend a Yoruba officer, but was arrested by Lieutenant Colonel G. T. Kurubo and Major P. A. Anwuna and imprisoned by General Aguiyi-Ironsi. He was accused of planning to kill the head of state. Banjo proclaimed his innocence, but was denied a trial. It is suspected that Banjo was detained because it was thought that he had a hand in the 1966 coup. The coup had inflamed tribal passions and divided the military. Banjo was detained in various prisons between January 1966 and May 1967. Northern Army leaders successfully carried out a counter-coup against Aguiyi-Ironsi, an Igbo. Ironsi and Colonel Fajuyi, Governor of the Western Region, were killed.

== Biafra, civil war and death ==
When Biafra was proclaimed on 30 May 1967, Banjo was released from an Eastern Nigerian prison by President Odumegwu Ojukwu and promoted to colonel. When the Nigerian Army invaded Biafra on 6 July 1967, Ojukwu sent Banjo and Major Albert Okonkwo to invade Nigeria. Banjo was able to capture Benin City in less than a day and was able to get within 300 kilometers of then-capital Lagos. After Banjo was repulsed at the Battle of Ore, he and other officers (Emmanuel Ifeajuna, Phillip Alale, and Sam Agbam) were accused of plotting a coup against Ojukwu. After a hurried trial, that some authors characterized as biased, they were found guilty of treason and sentenced to death. They were executed by firing squad on 22 September 1967.
