= Akpo =

Offshore oil field of Nigeria

Akpo field
- Location within Nigeria
- Country: Nigeria
- Region: Niger Delta
- Location: 200 km off the coast of Rivers State
- Block: OML 130
- Offshore/onshore: Offshore
- Coordinates: 3°1′11″N 6°58′15″E
- Operators: TOTAL E&P
- Partners: (planned) South Atlantic Petroleum, Total S.A., Petrobras and CNOOC

Field history
- Discovery: 2000
- Start of development: 2005
- Start of production: March 2009

Production
- Current production of oil: 150 barrels per day (~7,500 t/a)
- Current production of gas: 300×10^{6} cu ft/d (8.5×10^{6} m^{3}/d)
- Peak of production (oil): 175,000 barrels per day (~8.72×10^{6} t/a)
- Peak of production (gas): 320 million cubic feet per day (9.1×10^{6} m^{3}/d)

For the Sheffield Wednesday striker see Akpo Sodje

Akpo field is an offshore natural gas and condensate field located in ultra-deep water off the coast of Nigeria. It was discovered in 2000. The field lies within OML 130, approximately 200 kilometres (124 mi) offshore from Port Harcourt, in water depths ranging from 1,100 to 1,700 metres (3,600 to 5,600 feet).

The field is operated by TotalEnergies, which holds a 24% interest. It forms part of PML 2/3/4, formerly OML 130.

== Field Development ==
The Akpo development was designed around an FPSO and 44 subsea wells: 22 production wells, 20 water-injection wells and two gas-injection wells.

The subsea infrastructure consists of 110 kilometres (68 mi) of a complex ...

== Activities ==
BJ Services Completes Major Subsea Ops Offshore Nigeria Type: Subsea Equipment

Nov. 2009 - A subsea pipeline pre-commissioning operation performed by BJ Services Company was completed on the Akpo field in the Oil Mining Lease 130 Block, roughly 200 kilometres (124 miles) south of Port Harcourt, Nigeria in water depths of 1,200 to 1,400 m (3,900 to 4,600 ft). The company performed a series of pre-commissioning services on the field's flowlines and umbilicals. Akpo achieved first production in March 2009, and peak production of 175,000 barrels (27,800 m^{3}) of condensate a day and 320 million cubic feet (9.1 million cubic metres) per day of gas is expected during the fourth quarter of 2009.
