= 1976 Nigerian coup attempt =

1979 coup attempt by Buka Suka Dimka

1976 Nigerian coup d'état attempt
| Date | February 13, 1976 |
| Location | Nigeria |
| Result | Coup fails.: Murtala Mohammed is assassinated and succeeded by Olusegun Obasanjo. |

Belligerents
| (Nigeria) Nigerian Military government; Supreme Military Council (SMC) | Armed Forces faction |

Commanders and leaders
| Murtala Mohammed †; Olusegun Obasanjo | Bukar Suka Dimka |

The 1976 Nigerian coup d'état attempt was a military coup attempt which took place in Nigeria on 13 February 1976 when a faction of Armed Forces officers, led by Lieutenant Colonel Bukar Suka Dimka, attempted to overthrow the government of General Murtala Mohammed (who himself took power in the 1975 coup d'état).

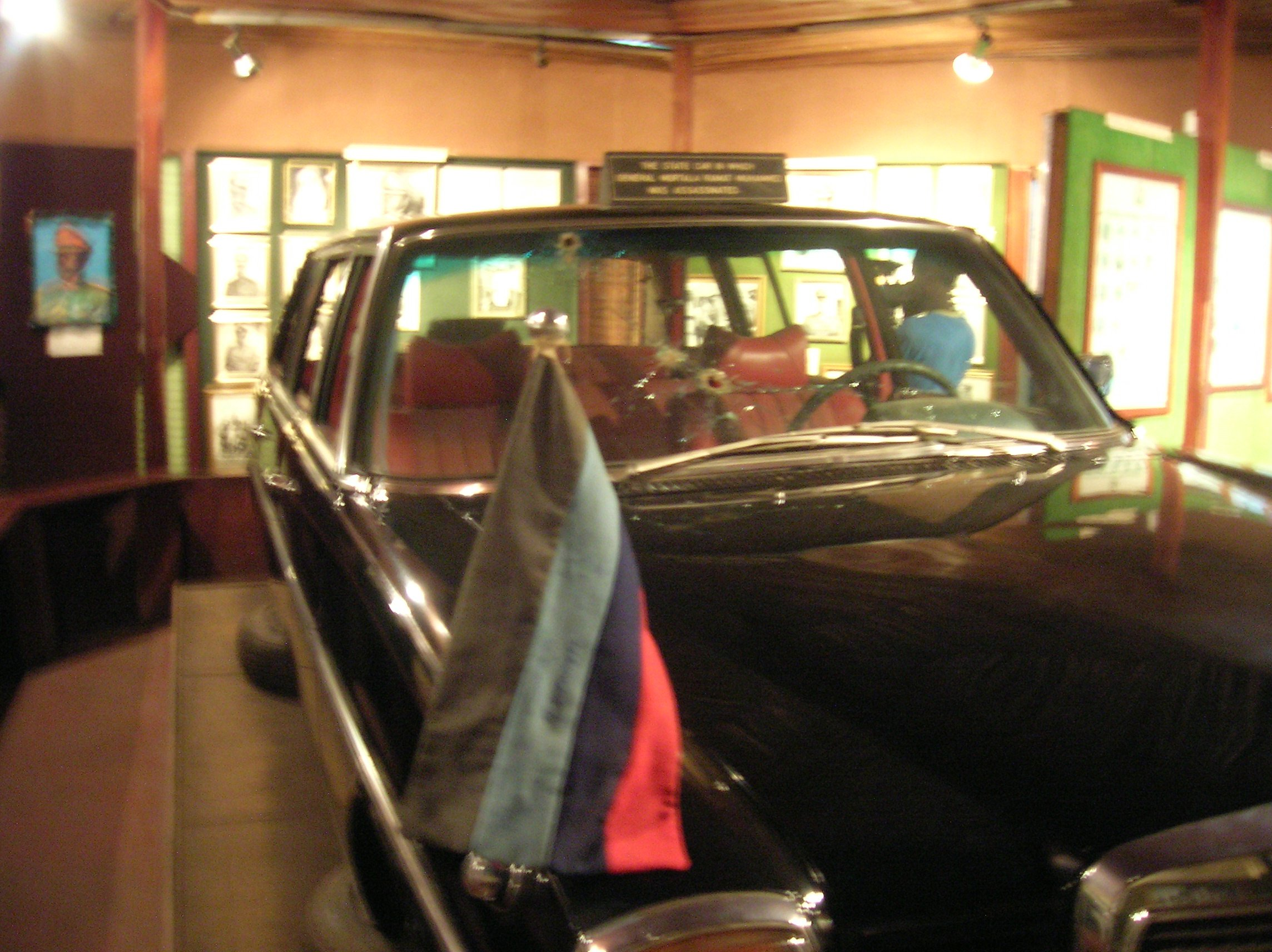
Mercedes-Benz /8 in which Mohammed was assassinated; note bullet holes in the windshield. Displayed at the Nigerian National Museum in Lagos.

Mohammed was assassinated in Lagos, along with his aide-de-camp Lieutenant Akintunde Akinsehinwa, when his car was ambushed in Ikoyi en route to the Dodan Barracks, by a group of soldiers led by Dimka. In a planned broadcast to the nation, Dimka had cited corruption, indecision, arrest and detention without trial, weakness on the part of Mohammed and maladministration in general as the reasons for overthrowing the government. The coup attempt was crushed several hours later by government troops.

After a three-week manhunt, Dimka was arrested near Abakaliki in southeastern Nigeria on 6 March 1976. Following a court martial, Dimka and another 6 co-conspirators were executed by firing squad on 15 May 1976.

General Mohammed was succeeded by Lieutenant General Olusegun Obasanjo as head of state.

== See also ==
- '76 (film), a Nigerian film by Izu Ojukwu set during the coup
