= Max Siollun =

Nigerian historian

Max Siollun is a British historian who specializes on Nigerian history with a particular focus on the Nigerian military and how it has affected Nigeria's socio-political trajectory from the pre-colonial era to the present. Siollun was educated in England, graduating from the University of London.

== Articles and books ==
Siollun's book Oil, Politics and Violence: Nigeria's Military Coup Culture (1966–1976), published in 2009, has received favourable reviews by numerous commentators who note Siollun's contribution to Nigerian history, not least for its dispassionate tone, critical insight and unpacking of a complex series of events which were hitherto poorly documented or not documented at all.

Siollun has written about the Dikko affair, which strained diplomatic relations between the United Kingdom and Nigeria for some time. Siollun's fifth book The Forgotten Era: Nigeria Before British Rule was published in 2025 via Pluto Press.

== Bibliography ==
- Oil, Politics and Violence: Nigeria's Military Coup Culture (1966–1976). Algora Publishing. 2009. ISBN 978-0-87586-708-3.
- Soldiers of Fortune: Nigerian Politics From Buhari to Babangida(1983-1993). Cassava Republic Press. 2013. ISBN 978-978-50238-2-4.
- Nigeria's Soldiers of Fortune: The Abacha and Obasanjo Years. Oxford University Press. 2019. ISBN 9781787382022.
- What Britain Did to Nigeria: A Short History of Conquest and Rule, C. Hurst & Co Publishers, 2021. ISBN 978-1787383845.
- The Forgotten Era: Nigeria Before British Rule. Pluto Press. 2025. ISBN 9780745350080.
