= Adekunle Fajuyi =

Nigerian soldier

Military Governor of Western Nigeria
- In office 15 January – 29 July 1966
- Preceded by: Position established
- Succeeded by: Robert Adeyinka Adebayo

Personal details
- Born: 26 June 1926 Ado Ekiti, Nigeria
- Died: 29 July 1966 (aged 40) Ibadan
- Party: None (Military)

Francis Adekunle Fajuyi MC BEM (26 June 1926 – 29 July 1966) was a Nigerian soldier of Yoruba origin and the first military governor of the former Western Region, Nigeria.

Originally a teacher and clerk, Fajuyi, a native of Ado Ekiti, joined the army in 1943, and as a sergeant in the Nigeria Signal Squadron, Royal West African Frontier Force, was awarded the British Empire Medal in 1951 for helping to contain a mutiny in his unit over food rations. He was trained at the Eaton Hall Officer Candidate School in the United Kingdom from July 1954 until November 1954, when he was short-service commissioned. In 1961, as the 'C' Company commander with the 4 battalion, Queen's Own Nigeria Regiment under Lt. Col. Price, Major Fajuyi was awarded the Military Cross for actions in North Katanga and extricating his unit from an ambush. On completion of Congo operations, Fajuyi became the first indigenous commander of the 1st battalion in Enugu, a position he held until just before the first coup of January 1966, when he was posted to Abeokuta as garrison commander. When Major General Ironsi emerged as the new commander in chief on 17 January 1966, he appointed Fajuyi the first military governor of the Western Region.

== Assassination ==
Fajuyi was assassinated by the revenge seeking counter-coup plotter, Major T. Y. Danjuma on 29 July 1966, at Ibadan, along with General Johnson Aguiyi-Ironsi, the Head of State and Supreme Commander of the Armed Forces of the Federal Republic of Nigeria who had arrived in Ibadan on 28 July 1966 to address a conference of traditional rulers of Western Nigeria. The bloody overthrow of the civilian regime of Prime Minister Sir Tafawa Balewa's government had taken place six months earlier in which the prime minister and other top government functionaries, especially of northern Nigerian extraction, were killed.
