= Theophilus Danjuma =

Nigerian general and oil magnate (born 1938)

Lieutenant general Theophilus Danjuma GCON
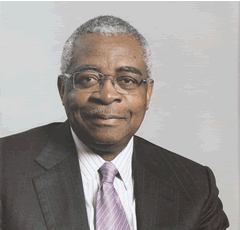
- Theophilus Danjuma

Minister of Defence
- In office June 1999 – May 2003
- Preceded by: Abdulsalami Abubakar
- Succeeded by: Rabiu Kwankwaso

Chief of Army Staff
- In office 29 July 1975 – 30 September 1979
- Preceded by: David Ejoor
- Succeeded by: Ipoola Alani Akinrinade

Personal details
- Born: 9 December 1938 (age 87) Takum, Northern Region, British Nigeria (now in Taraba State, Nigeria)
- Party: Peoples Democratic Party
- Education: Nigerian Defence Academy

Military service
- Branch/service: Nigerian Army
- Years of service: 1960–1979
- Rank: Lieutenant general
- Battles/wars: Congo Crisis; Nigerian Civil War

Theophilus Yakubu Danjuma GCON FSS psc (born 9 December 1938) is a Nigerian politician and retired lieutenant general who played a key role in post-independence military and political events in Nigeria. Danjuma amassed an enormous fortune through shipping and petroleum.

He was Chief of Army Staff from July 1975 to October 1978. He was also Minister of Defence under President Olusegun Obasanjo's administration.

== Early life ==
Danjuma was born in Takum, Northern Region (present-day Taraba State, Nigeria), to Kuru Danjuma and Rufkatu Asibi. Takum was mainly a farming community when Danjuma was young, and yams, rice, cassava, and beniseed were largely cultivated by families and clans. His father was a hard-working peasant whose ancestors were all highly respected members of the community. Kuru Danjuma was a farmer who traded metal parts for farming implements and tools.

Danjuma started his education at St Bartholomew's Primary School in Wusasa and moved on to the Benue Provincial Secondary School in Katsina-Ala, where he was the captain of the school cricket 1st XI team; he received his Higher School Certificate in 1958. In 1959, Danjuma enrolled at the Nigerian College of Arts, Science, and Technology in Zaria (Ahmadu Bello University) to study history on a Northern Nigeria scholarship. However, by the end of 1960, Danjuma had left the university to enrol in the Nigerian Army.

== Military career ==
Danjuma was commissioned into the Nigerian Army as a second lieutenant and platoon commander in the Congo. In 1963, he joined a UN peacekeeping force in Sante, Katanga Province, in Congo. He was promoted to the position of captain three years later. Following the 1966 Nigerian coup d'état that killed the Premier of Northern Nigeria Ahmadu Bello, Danjuma, alongside other officers from Northern Nigeria, took part in the July counter-coup, which ousted General Aguiyi Ironsi, replacing him with General Yakubu Gowon. During the operation, northern soldiers under his command arrested Nigeria's Head of State, Major-General Johnson Aguiyi-Ironsi, who was visiting Ibadan and staying with his host, Colonel Adekunle Fajuyi. Although Danjuma intended to take Ironsi to custody, discipline collapsed and Danjuma lost control of the enraged soldiers, resulting in the deaths of both Aguiyi-Ironsi and Fajuyi.

In 1967, he was promoted to lieutenant colonel at the start of the civil war campaign towards Enugu, which was captured later that year. In December 1967, he was appointed Commander of the Nigerian Army's 1st Infantry Brigade, a position he held till July 1968. Towards the end of the Nigerian Civil War, Danjuma led a battalion that freed Jaja Wachuku, first Speaker of the Nigerian House of Representatives and the first Ambassador to the United Nations and first Foreign Affairs Minister, from detention by the Ojukwu government.

In 1970, Danjuma attended the International Court Martial in Trinidad and Tobago as Nigeria's representative, where he was appointed president of the tribunal in a case brought against members of a failed coup attempt in Trinidad and Tobago. Following his promotion to Colonel in 1971, he spent the next two years with responsibility for court-martialing Army officers proven guilty of corruption and indiscipline. In 1975, he was promoted to brigadier and the position of General Officer Commanding (GOC), and in the following year he became the Chief of Army Staff to the Head of State, Olusegun Obasanjo. He played a prominent role in supporting the president in resisting the Dimka Coup in 1976. He retired from the Nigerian army in 1979.

== Later career ==
=== Business ===
Formed in 1979 by Danjuma, Nigeria American Line (NAL) began business and initially leased a ship called "Hannatu," which traded between Lagos and Santos in Brazil when Nigeria's bilateral trade agreement had opened the sea routes to economies in the South American markets. NAL went on to win patronage from Nigeria's National Supply Company (NNSC) to bring in government goods. NAL's list of growing clients included DICON Salt (Nigeria), project cargoes for Iwopin Paper Mill, ANNAMCO and Volkswagen Nigeria. NAL became a member of AWAFC (American West African Freight Conference), the Brazil-Nigeria Freight Conference and the Mediterranean Line (MEWAC). With the formation of the National Maritime Authority (NMA) in 1987/88, the profile of NAL increased as NMA encouraged indigenous operators to claim their share of internationally traded cargo involving Nigeria. NAL began with a core indigenous staff of about 12 in 1979. In 2009, staff in NAL-COMET were closer to 250, including approximately 12 expatriate staff members. From the Lagos office, the NAL-COMET Group opened branch offices in Port Harcourt, which serve Onne, Warri and Calabar seaports.

COMET Shipping Agencies Nigeria Limited was established in 1984 by Danjuma, primarily to act as an agent for Nigeria American Line (NAL). COMET has grown and by the late nineties, it became one of the largest independent agents operating in Nigeria with experience in handling many types of vessels and cargo. In 2009, Comet handled over 200 vessels at the ports of Lagos, Port Harcourt, Calabar and Warri. In 2005, NAL-COMET acquired a roll-in-roll-out port (RORO) in Lagos, which makes it one of the largest independent port operators in Africa.

South Atlantic Petroleum (SAPETRO) is a Nigerian oil exploration and production company established in 1995 by Danjuma. The ministry of Petroleum Resources in Nigeria awarded the Oil Prospecting License (OPL) 246 to SAPETRO in February 1998. The block covers a total area of 2,590 square kilometres (1,000 sq mi). SAPETRO partnered with Total Upstream Nigeria Ltd (TUPNI) and Brasoil Oil Services Company Nigeria Ltd (Petrobras) to start prospecting on OPL246. Akpo, a condensate field, was discovered in April 2000 with the drilling of the first exploration well (Akpo 1) on the block. Other discoveries made on OPL 246 include the Egina Main, Egina South, Preowei and Kuro (Kuro was suspended as a dry gas/minor oil discovery).

In 2004, SAPETRO's subsidiary in Benin won through a competitive tender process an oil exploration contract covering 550 square kilometres offshore from the Republic of Benin.

In February 2005, SAPETRO was granted Oil Mining Lease (OML) 130 and thereafter the federal government backed in through the Nigerian National Petroleum Corporation (NNPC). In June 2006, SAPETRO divested part of its contractor rights and obligations to China National Offshore Oil Corporation (CNOOC). SAPETRO produced its "first oil" (condensate) on 4 March 2009.

In December 2009, SAPETRO donated a new state-of-the-art medical centre to Nasarawa State University. The medical centre, to be known as South Atlantic Petroleum Medical Centre, would be available to serve the University, the local and neighbouring communities.

NatCom Development & Investment Limited

Danjuma was named Board Chairman by the NatCom Development & Investment Limited "NatCom," trading as ntel. The announcement was made in July 2016 following Danjuma's inaugural board meeting. ntel commenced commercial operations of its 4G/LTE-Advanced network on 8 April 2016 in Lagos and Abuja. ntel is an advanced mobile 4G/LTE network providing superfast internet access that enables high-definition voice, data and video services. ntel's network is built on the 900/1800 MHz frequency bands which are the best propagation frequencies for the deployment of 4G/LTE technology. ntel's bouquet of services includes national bandwidth, international voice termination, international bandwidth, mobile and fixed communications services.

The company made its first on-net test data call in Lagos on Monday, 18 January 2016 and followed this with its first on-net Voice-over-LTE (VoLTE) call in Lagos on Thursday, 25 February 2016. Commercial operations commenced on Friday, 8 April 2016.

=== Politics ===
Since 1999, Danjuma has played an active role in Nigerian politics; some of his key appointments have been:

- 1999 Appointed as Minister of Defence to President Olusegun Obasanjo's cabinet
- 2003 Appointed as chairperson for the investigative committee on the Warri conflict
- 2010 Nominated as chairman of the Presidential Advisory Council by Acting President Goodluck Jonathan

While in office, Danjuma sought to curb the politicisation of the military and was a firm supporter of democracy and the rule of law. He also oversaw the renaming of all Nigerian barracks and cantons from those of civilian or living persons. He was also widely known to be an avid opponent of President Obasanjo's attempts in 2006 to engineer a way that would enable himself and state governors to serve more than two consecutive terms.

Danjuma serves as chairman of the Victims' Support Fund Committee, supporting the victims of terror such as the Chibok schoolgirls kidnapping. On 16 July 2014, in a speech at the Presidential Villa in Abuja, Danjuma told President Jonathan that "Boko Haram insurgents appear to be having the upper hand, as they choose where to strike and capture territory." He added that "the battle to win the insurgency war has already taken too long."

In 2018, during the Taraba State University convocation ceremony, Danjuma, in an emotional outburst, spoke against the killing of the people of Taraba by marauding armed herdsmen and accused the Nigerian military of complicity, urging Nigerians to defend themselves against the attacks.

=== Philanthropy ===
In December 2008, the TY Danjuma Foundation was created in Nigeria.

The foundation's principal aims are to provide durable advantages through the implementation of development programs. The foundation plans to operate more as a philanthropic organisation rather than simply as a charity. This would allow for the foundation to seek out other deserving causes and non-governmental organisations (NGOs) to partner with and make grants available.

The TY Danjuma Foundation seeks to alleviate poverty in communities by providing basic amenities and education for children and young adults while also providing free medical care for indigent people.

In Danjuma's home state of Taraba, US$500,000 has been given out as grants to NGOs working to alleviate the suffering of the residents. Taraba is historically one of Nigeria's most impoverished states, compounded by the absence of a health service that catered to the masses. Furthermore, the state has the most cases of river blindness and other debilitating illnesses.

The TY Danjuma Foundation has partnered with over 50 NGOs throughout Nigeria and with the support and cooperation of 36 state governors. One of the many NGOs that is being supported by the foundation is CASVI, working in Takum, Wukari and Donga. CASVI's main area of expertise is the provision of free eye care services, such as the treatment of river blindness in Wukari, Ibi and Donga.
