= 2016 Niger Delta conflict =

- Part of the conflict in the Niger Delta
Date	February 2016–present (10 years, 8 months)
Location	Niger Delta
Status	Ongoing

Belligerents
Nigeria: Niger Delta Revolutionary Crusaders (since 2019); Nigerian Armed Forces Involved states; Abia State; Akwa Ibom State; Bayelsa State; Cross River State; Delta State; Edo State; Imo State; Ondo State; Rivers State	Niger Delta Republic' Militant organizations: Adaka Boro Avengers; Asawana Deadly Force of Niger Delta; Niger Delta Avengers; Niger Delta Greenland Justice Mandate; Niger Delta Justice Defence Group; Niger Delta Volunteers; Niger Delta Red Squad; Niger Delta Revolutionary Crusaders (until 2019); Reformed Egbesu Fraternities; Egbesu Boys of the Niger Delta; Egbesu Red Water Lions; Egbesu Mightier Fraternity; (Republic of Biafra) Indigenous People of Biafra

Commanders and leaders
(Nigeria) Bola Tinubu (2023–present); (Nigeria) Olubunmi Tunji-Ojo (2023–present); (Nigeria) Kayode Egbetokun (2023–present); Mohammed Badaru Abubakar (2023–present); Christopher Gwabin Musa (2023–present); Taoreed Lagbaja (2023–present); Emmanuel Ogalla (2023–present); Hassan Abubakar (2023–present); Alex Otti (2023–present); Umo Eno (2023–present); Douye Diri (2020–present); Bassey Otu (2023–present); Sheriff Oborevwori (2023–present); Godwin Obaseki (2016–present); Hope Uzodinma (2020–present); Lucky Aiyedatiwa (2023–present); Siminalayi Fubara (2023–present); Former commanders: (Nigeria) Muhammadu Buhari; (Nigeria) Rauf Aregbesola; (Nigeria) Abdulrahman Dambazau; (Nigeria) Solomon Arase; (Nigeria) Ibrahim Kpotun Idris; (Nigeria) Mohammed Adamu; (Nigeria) Usman Alkali Baba; Bashir Salihi Magashi; Mansur Dan Ali; Abayomi Olonisakin; Lucky Irabor; Tukur Yusuf Buratai; Ibrahim Attahiru†; Faruk Yahaya; Ibok Ekwe Ibas; Awwal Zubairu Gambo; Sadique Abubakar; Isiaka Oladayo Amao; Okezie Ikpeazu; Udom Gabriel Emmanuel; Henry Seriake Dickson; Ben Ayade; Ifeanyi Okowa; Adams Oshiomhole; Rochas Okorocha; Emeka Ihedioha; Rotimi Akeredolu; Olusegun Mimiko; Nyesom Wike	Aldo Agbalaja (NDGJM); Nnamdi Kanu (IPOB)

Casualties and losses
Unknown	Unknown

The 2016 Niger Delta conflict is an ongoing conflict around the Niger Delta region of Nigeria in a bid for the secession of the region, which was a part of the breakaway state of Biafra. It follows on-and-off conflict in the Christian-dominated southern Niger Delta in the preceding years, as well as an insurgency in the Muslim-dominated northeast.

== Background ==
Like most other African countries, British Nigeria grouped people together for governance without respect for their religious, linguistic, and ethnic differences. The region became part of a Niger Coast Protectorate in the 1890s when communities of Niger Delta signed an agreement with the British colonial agents. It was subsumed into the Southern Nigeria Protectorate in 1900 without consultations with the people of the region. Southern Nigeria was then merged with the Northern Nigeria Protectorate in 1914 despite the political and cultural differences between the various ethnicities. Nigeria, which gained independence from the United Kingdom in 1960, had at that time a population of 60 million people consisting of nearly 300 differing ethnic and cultural groups.

Nigeria's oil, which became its primary source of income after independence from the British Empire, was located in the south of the country. The Igbo-dominated secessionist state of Biafra that came into existence in 1967 acquired the oil-rich region which played a key role in the Nigerian Civil War. Despite this, the region's development was ignored by successive governments. As a result, the region remains the poorest and most backward region of the country. The region's waters have also become highly polluted due to millions of tons of oil being spilled. Due to these reasons, the region has become afflicted with militancy.

People of the region have protested against the negative impact of the oil industry, corruption and lack of development. In recent years, militant groups seeking to control the resources have indulged in oil theft and violence which sometimes has been claimed as retribution for mistreatment of the locals by the oil industry. A violent insurgency was carried out under the banner Movement for the Emancipation of the Niger Delta (MEND) until an amnesty agreement in 2009 by Late President Umaru Musa Yar'adua. The election of Goodluck Jonathan (a Christian) as President of Nigeria was a significant factor in the ceasefire as he hailed from the region and was considered to be sympathetic to it. The conflict reignited after the election of Muhammadu Buhari (a Muslim) as president in 2015. This was due, in part, to rumours that Buhari was considering scrapping the amnesty agreement and, more generally, the traditional northern–southern and Muslim–Christian divide.

== Conflict ==
=== February–August 2016 ===
A spate of bombings on oil installations started in February 2016. The Niger Delta Avengers (NDA) then publicly announced its existence in March 2016. The NDA's declared aims are to create a sovereign state and they have threatened to disrupt Nigeria's economy to achieve their goals. The group has also criticised President of Nigeria Muhammadu Buhari for never visiting the region as well as for his detention of the Indigenous People of Biafra (IPOB) leader Nnamdi Kanu, who said he was not affiliated with either MEND or the NDA. A militant group calling itself Red Egbesu Water Lions later emerged in May 2016 and demanded his release, as well as that of former National Security Advisor Sambo Dasuki. It also demanded that the Economic and Financial Crimes Commission de-freeze the bank accounts of Government Ekpemupolo, as well as unconditional compensation to the victims of the Bonga oil spill and Chevron gas explosion. It further threatened to shut down all oil exploration activities in the region of its demands were not met. Another group calling itself Egbesu Mightier Fraternity emerged in the same month, demanding the release of Kanu and Dasuki in 14 days and that the Nigerian military leave the Gbaramatu Kingdom and stop harassing Ekpemupolo. It also threatened to blow up all offshore facilities in the region if the government did not meet its demands.

A group calling itself Joint Niger Delta Liberation Force emerged in early June 2016 and vowed to launch six missiles in the Niger Delta on 7 June. It further warned that it will bring down any helicopter deployed in the area and that it might shut down the Nigerian satellite orbit within a week so that telecommunications within the country would be cut off. It also demanded that the Nigerian military leave the Ijaw communities. On 7 June, it renewed its threat claiming that it was going to target national buildings and infrastructure of oil companies in Lagos, Abuja and Kaduna, as well as all military formations in Lagos, Abuja, Kaduna and Benue.

A dispute then developed between the militant factions as one of the groups calling itself Reformed Egbesu Boys of the Niger Delta unilaterally announced a ceasefire on 13 June. Although the group agreed with other groups over cessation of hostilities, it was opposed to demands regarding Kanu and Dasuki.

A group calling itself the Niger Delta Red Squad declared its existence in late June 2016. The group claimed that it had blown up two pipelines belonging to Shell in the Asa/Awarra axis and also threatened to attack major oil pipelines in Oguta Council area, as well as shutdown all oil wells in Imo State. A few days later, another group calling itself Adaka Boro Avengers emerged, threatening to destroy oil producing facilities and warned all oil companies to leave the Niger Delta within a week In July, the group announced that it would declare an independent state on 1 August and warned all northern Nigerians to leave the region. It however abandoned its bid on the same day it was supposed to declare an independent state.

A group calling itself Asawana Deadly Force of Niger Delta also emerged in late June 2016 and demanded independence for the region within a few days while threatening to shut down oil production in the region if it failed to achieve its goal.

On 8 July, a new group called Niger Delta Revolutionary Crusaders (NDRC) bombed the Brass Creek Manifold in Bayelsa State. On 13 July, the group then declared a two-week ceasefire. On 1 August, the group released a statement in which it accused northern Nigerians of plotting to Islamisise the region in order to take control of its oil. After the new Boko Haram leader Abu Musab al-Barnawi threatened to increase attacks on Christians and destroy churches, the NDRC, on 6 August, threatened to kill Muslims and destroy mosques if Boko Haram carried out its threats.

On 9 August, Niger Delta Greenland Justice Mandate declared its existence and threatened to destroy refineries in Port Harcourt and Warri within 48 hours, as well as a gas plant in Otu Jeremi within a few days. The next day, the group reportedly blew up a major oil pipeline operated by the Nigerian Petroleum Development Company (NPDC) in Isoko On 12 August, the group warned that it would blow up more oil installations in the future. On 19 August, the group was reported to have blown up two pipelines belonging to NPDC in Delta State.

==== Ceasefire ====
In late August 2016, the NDA declared a unilateral ceasefire and agreed to negotiations with the Nigerian government. After the declaration of a ceasefire by the Niger Delta Avengers, the Reformed Egbesu Fraternities comprising the three militants groups Egbesu Boys of the Niger Delta, Egbesu Red Water Lions and Egbesu Mightier Fraternity also announced a 60-day ceasefire.

=== Operation Crocodile Smile (August 2016–September 2016) ===
Nigeria's Army launched "Operation Crocodile Smile" in late August to get rid of all criminal activities in Niger Delta. On 26 September, five militants were killed in clashes while 23 were arrested. On 30 August, NDGJM blew up the Ogor-Oteri oil pipeline in the Delta state and declared the launch of "Operation Crocodile Tears" in response to the military's operation. On 1 September, the Nigerian Army captured Gabriel Ogbudje, a supposed ex-militant who they claimed had now become leader of a new militant group Otugas Fire Force. 14 oil workers and their driver on their way to Port Harcourt were kidnapped by unknown gunmen on 2 September after the vehicle transporting them was hijacked on Omoku-Elele road.

On 4 September, NDGJM claimed it had rigged all the marked oil and gas facilities with explosives and warned residents living nearby to evacuate. Chief of Army Staff Tukur Yusuf Buratai officially launched the operation on 5 September. Niger Delta Avengers mocked the operation on 8 September claiming 20 soldiers were killed in it and also claimed that the Nigerian military was harassing citizens of Niger Delta. The operation concluded on 11 September. During the operation, 23 militants were killed while 38 militant camps, 91 illegal refineries and bunkering sites were destroyed during the operation.

=== Continued insurgency (September 2016–present) ===
The oil workers kidnapped in early September were released by 18 September after the police engaged in a shootout with the kidnappers. On 13 September, NDGJM stated they had blown up the Afiesere-Iwhrenene pipeline belonging to NPDC in Ughelli North. On 19 September, the group stated they had blown up a crude oil pipeline belonging to NPDC near Ekuigbo in Ughelli North. On 20 September, Abraham Suru, one of the suspected leaders of NDA was arrested.

On 24 September, Niger Delta Avengers claimed they had blown up the Bonny pipeline. On 27 September, a militant group calling itself Niger Delta Volunteers (NDV) warned the government that it will cripple all its infrastructure that generated income, describing the bombing by Avengers on Bonny pipeline as a "child's play". It also warned oil companies to evacuate their staff and suspend their operations, adding that their next strike will be deadly. Meanwhile, Niger Delta Justice Defence Group (NDJDG) blew up an oil pipeline in Gokana. On 28 September, NDJDG warned Buhari that they will destroy any national asset he tries to sell. Meanwhile, a militant was killed in clashes between NDA and Imo Security Network in Owerri. On 29 September, NDGJM claimed it had blown up the Unenurhie-Evwreni pipeline belonging to the NPDC.

On 9 November, Niger Delta Avengers said it was behind an attack on Shell's Forçados crude pipeline a day earlier.

== Reactions ==
MEND had condemned the ensuing militancy in its early days. However, by September it abandoned the negotiating position with the government and sought a unified voice for the Niger Delta, even proposing to work with the NDA.

The NDA announced its intention for a declaration of independence on 1 October, which gained the support of IPOB despite the group saying it was unaffiliated with the former as Powerful said: "We have nothing to do with MEND, but our philosophy aligns with that of Niger Delta Avengers who bravely called for the release of our leader and had maintained it till date. Avengers and IPOB are one in pursuit of freedom for all the peoples of Biafra. IPOB is in total support of the proposed independence declaration proposed by Avengers on the 1st of October." However, later IPOB and the Renegade Indigenous People of Biafra (RENIPOB), a faction from the Kanu-led IPOB, decided to re-unite and would surrender to the Nigerian government on 15 January 2017. As a consequence its intention for the burning of the flag of Biafra on 1 October was then replaced by an intention of surrender to the government.

Following Kanu's arrest, IPOB spokesman, Comrade Emma Powerful said of Nigeria that it was a "contraption done by the former British colonialists which is no longer working, hence the quest of the Biafrans to opt out of the incompatible marriage – the 1914 Amalgamation."
