= Azubuike Ihejirika =

18th Chief of Army Staff (Nigeria)

Lieutenant general Azubuike Ihejirika CFR GSS psc(+) fwc fniqs
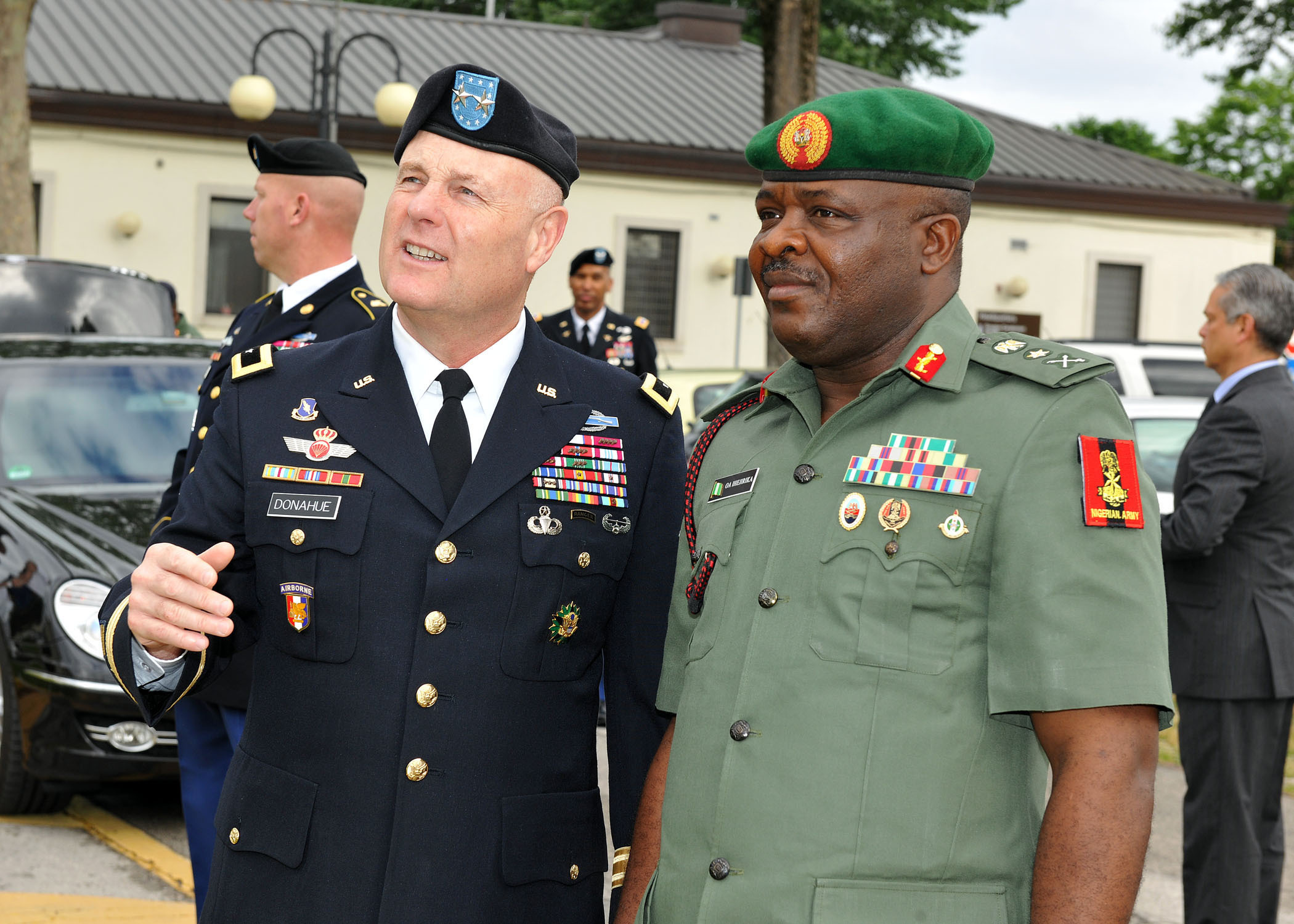
- Ihejirika (right) and Maj. Gen. Patrick J. Donahue II (U.S. Army Africa commander) in 2013.

Chief of Army Staff
- In office September 2010 – January 2014
- Preceded by: Lt-Gen. A.B. Dambazau
- Succeeded by: Lt-Gen. K. Minimah

Personal details
- Born: 13 February 1956 (age 70) Isuikwuato, Eastern Region, British Nigeria (now in Abia State, Nigeria)
- Awards: Commander of the Federal Republic, CFR
- Nickname: Dike Abia

Military service
- Allegiance: Nigeria
- Branch/service: Nigerian Army
- Years of service: 17 December 1977–January 2014
- Rank: Lieutenant general
- Unit: 81 Division
- Commands: Lagos garrison Command
- Battles/wars: Boko Haram Insurgency War

Azubuike Ihejirika,// CFR GSS psc(+) fwc fniqs (born 13 February 1956) is a retired Nigerian Army Lieutenant general and former Chief of Army Staff.

== Early life and education ==
Ihejirika was born on 13 February 1956, in Isuikwuato Local Government Area of Abia State, Southeastern Nigeria. He was educated at Williams Memorial High School in Afugiri, a town in Umuahia North, Abia State where he obtained a London General Certificate in 1975, as well as the West African Senior School Certificate Examination with a grade I distinction. He is a member of the 18th Regular Combatant Course of the Nigerian Defence Academy, Kaduna and was commissioned Second Lieutenant in December 1977 into the Corps of Nigerian Army Engineers (NAE). Ihejirika holds a BSc (Hons) in Quantity Survey from the Ahmadu Bello University, Zaria and is an alumnus of military institutions such as the Command and Staff College, Jajii and the National War College.

== Military career ==
Ihejirika was on the Directing Staff at the Command and Staff College, Jajii and was Principal Staff Officer at the Defence and Army Headquarters. He also held various command appointments including:

- Commander 41 Division Engineers
- Acting General Officer Commanding, 1 Division
- General Officer Commanding, 81 Division

Ihejirika was appointed Chief of Army Staff (COAS) on 8 September 2010, by President Goodluck Jonathan. He served as COAS for over 3 years until his retirement in January 2014.

== Life after military ==
After Ihejirika retired as the Chief of Army Staff in January 2014, he returned to his hometown Isuikwuato where he was honored with a chieftaincy title, "Dike Abia" (in Igbo), the "Warrior of Abia" (in British English).

"I thought they will give me a chieftaincy title but they made me a king. I therefore dedicate this title to my commanders and soldiers who showed strength in the midst of daunting challenges", he said.

== Boko Haram sponsorship accusation ==
In August 2014, it was reported that Ihejirika was among the sponsors of the deadly Islamic sect Boko Haram alongside Senator Ali Modu Sheriff, the former Executive Governor of Borno State, Nigeria. The allegation was made by the Australian negotiator Stephen Davis who has been working with the Nigerian Security Agencies in the rescue of the abducted Chibok School Girls.

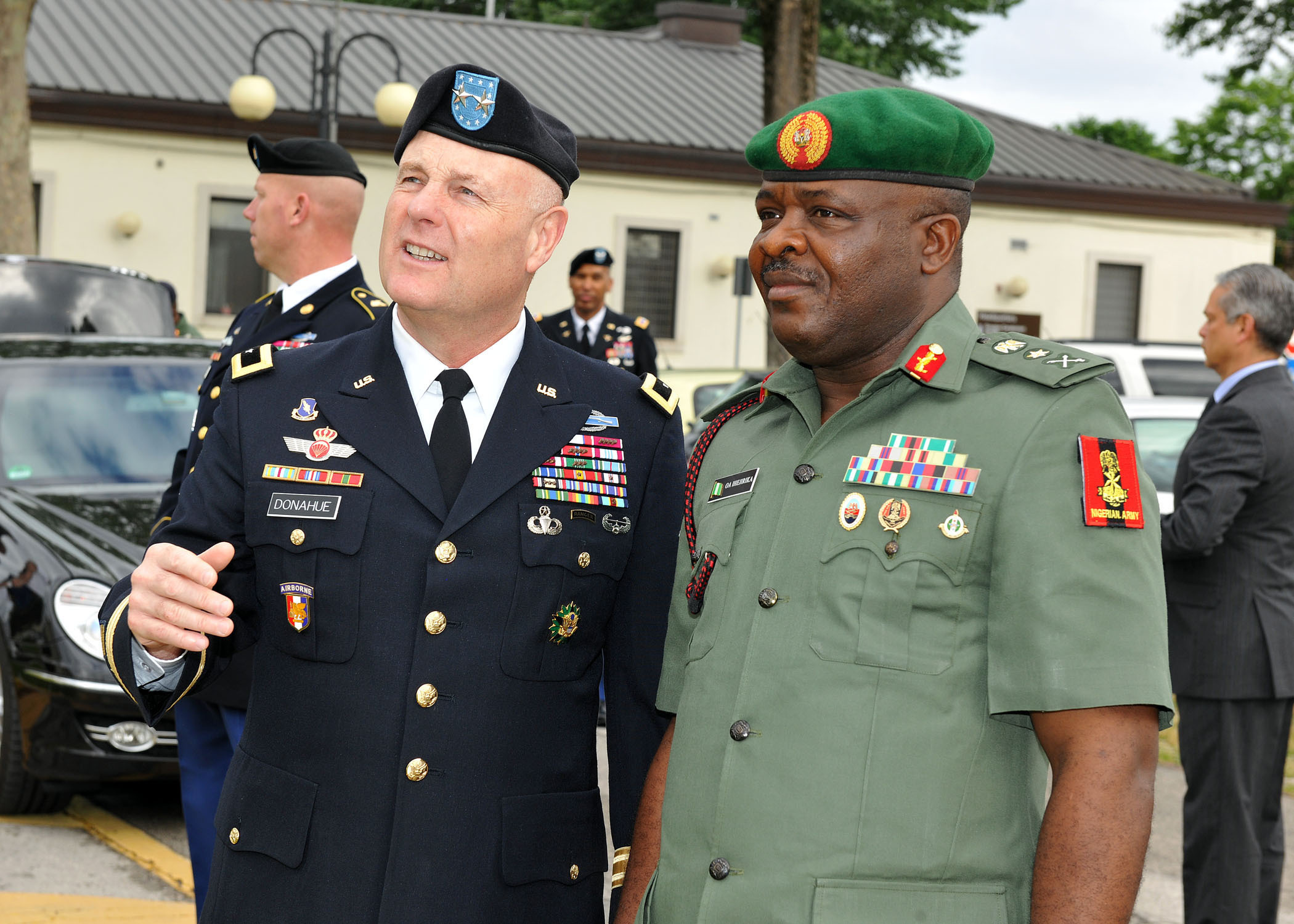
Lt. Gen. Azubuike Ihejirika, chief of Army Staff, Nigeria and Maj. Gen. Patrick J. Donahue II, U.S. Army Africa commander, take a moment to read the names at the Fallen Warrior memorial in front of the USARAF Headquarters.

The State Security Service absolved Ihejirika of claims that he was a major financier of Boko Haram .

== Awards ==
Ihejirika has won several awards and honours, among others are;

- Commander of the Federal Republic, CFR awarded by Goodluck Ebele Jonathan, the President of Federal Republic of Nigeria
- The Forces Service Star (FSS) awarded by the Nigerian Army
- Meritorious Service Star (MSS) awarded by the Nigerian Army.
- Distinguished Service Star (DSS)awarded by the Nigerian Army.
- Grand Service Star (GSS)awarded by the Nigerian Army.
- Passed Staff College Dagger (psc(+))awarded by the Armed Forces Command and Staff College, Jaji.
- Fellow National War College (FOC)
