= Ibrahim Attahiru =

Nigerian army lieutenant general (1966–2021)

Lieutenant general Ibrahim Attahiru CFR psc(+) GSS CMH ndc (K) FCMH NAM
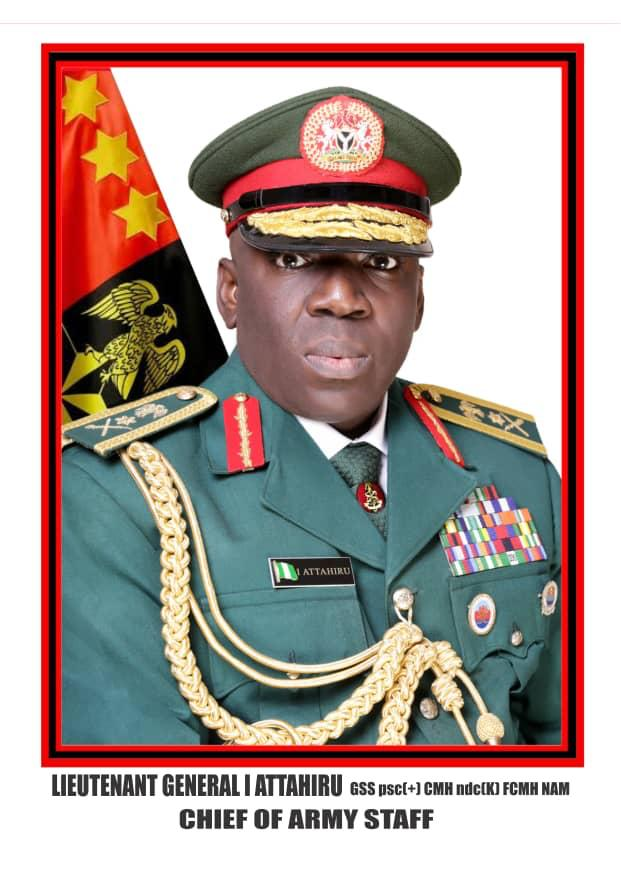

Chief of Army Staff
- In office 28 January 2021 – 21 May 2021
- Preceded by: Tukur Yusuf Buratai
- Succeeded by: Farouk Yahaya

Commander of Operation Lafiya Dole
- In office May 2017 – December 2017
- Preceded by: Leo Irabor
- Succeeded by: Rogers Nicholas

Personal details
- Born: 10 August 1966 Doka, Northern Region, Nigeria (now in Kaduna State, Nigeria)
- Died: 21 May 2021 (aged 54) Kaduna, Kaduna State, Nigeria
- Resting place: National Military Cemetery, Abuja
- Education: Nigerian Defence Academy; Salford University

Military service
- Allegiance: Nigeria
- Branch/service: Nigerian Army
- Years of service: 1984–2021
- Rank: Lieutenant general

Ibrahim Attahiru CFR psc(+) GSS CMH ndc (K) FCMH NAM (10 August 1966 – 21 May 2021) was a Nigerian army lieutenant general who served as the Chief of Army Staff from 28 January 2021 to 21 May 2021 when he died in the 2021 NAF Beechcraft B300 King Air 350i crash near Kaduna International Airport.

== Early life and education ==
Attahiru was born on 10 August 1966 in Doka, Kaduna North Local Government Area, Kaduna State. He was a member of 35 regular course and graduate of the prestigious Nigerian Defence Academy, Armed Forces Command and Staff College, and Nigerian Army School of Infantry. He commenced officer cadet training in January 1984 and was commissioned as a Second Lieutenant in December 1986 as an Infantry Officer. He held a master's degree in Strategic Management and Policy Studies from the Nigerian Defence Academy. He also attained a Masters of Science in Human Resources Management and Development from Salford University in the United Kingdom and a Graduate Diploma in International Studies from the University of Nairobi.

== Military career ==
He had a tour of duty with the United Nations in Sierra Leone as a Military Observer, where he facilitated the British Army's Operation Barras in September 2000. He was an operations officer for ECOMOG Operations in Liberia.

As a staff officer, he was Chief of Defence Transformation and Innovation and Chief of Defence Logistics at Defence Headquarters Abuja. In that position, he worked with the Defence Logistics Agency on enhancing the operational readiness in the Armed Forces of Nigeria. He was an Instructor at the Nigerian Defence Academy and the Nigerian Army School of Infantry. He was later a directing staff and Chief Instructor at the Armed Forces Command and Staff College, Jaji – Kaduna.

He was at the National Defence College in Kenya for the National Defence Management and Security Studies Course and at the Chinese People's Liberation Army Special Forces Academy Shijiazhuang-Hubei Province, China for the Basic and Advanced Special/Operations Commando Forces Courses. He undertook leadership and security policy course at the prestigious Kennedy School of Government, Harvard University USA, Graduate School of Media and Communication, Agha Khan University of Nairobi, Bournemouth University Disaster Management Center, and the Geneva Centre for Security Policy.

== Death ==
On the evening of 21 May 2021 Attahiru was traveling on a Nigerian Air Force Beechcraft King Air 350 on an official visit to Kaduna, where he was to attend the Passing out Parade of 80RRI in Depot Nigerian Army on 22 May 2021. During the journey the plane crashed, killing Attahiru and all ten other people on board.

== Awards and recommendations ==
The General was a highly decorated officer with UNAMSIL Medal, ECOMOG Medal, Forces Service Star, Meritorious Service Star, Distinguish Service Star, Grand Service Star, Corp Medal of Honour, Command medal, Field Command Medal, and Field Command Medal of Honour.
