= Oladipo Diya =

Nigerian general and politician (1944–2023)

Lieutenant General Oladipo Diya GCON

9th Chief of General Staff
- In office 17 November 1993 – 21 December 1997
- Head of state: Sani Abacha
- Preceded by: Augustus Aikhomu
- Succeeded by: Mike Akhigbe

Chief of Defence Staff
- In office 17 November 1993 – 21 December 1997
- Preceded by: Sani Abacha
- Succeeded by: Abdulsalami Abubakar

Governor of Ogun State
- In office January 1984 – August 1985
- Preceded by: Olabisi Onabanjo
- Succeeded by: Oladayo Popoola

Personal details
- Born: Donaldson Oladipo Oyeyinka Diya; 3 April 1944 Odogbolu, Southern Region, British Nigeria (now in Ogun State, Nigeria)
- Died: 26 March 2023 (aged 78) Lagos, Nigeria
- Spouse: Deborah Folashade Diya (died 2020)
- Education: Nigerian Defence Academy; Ahmadu Bello University (LLB); Nigerian Law School
- Occupation: Military officer; lawyer

Military service
- Allegiance: Nigeria
- Branch: Nigerian Army
- Service years: 1964–1998
- Rank: Lieutenant general
- Conflict: Nigerian Civil War

Donaldson Oladipo Oyeyinka Diya GCON, BL, PSC, FSS, mni (3 April 1944 – 26 March 2023) was a Nigerian general and lawyer who served as Chief of General Staff (de facto vice president of Nigeria) under military head of state General Sani Abacha from 1993 until his arrest for treason in 1997. He also served as Chief of Defence Staff and as military governor of Ogun State from January 1984 to August 1985.

== Early life ==
Donaldson Oladipo Diya was born on 3 April 1944 in Odogbolu, Ogun State, then Western Region, Nigeria. He had his primary education at Yaba Methodist Primary School, Lagos and Odogbolu Grammar School. He was the older brother of politician Oyewole Diya.

== Military career ==
Diya joined the Nigerian Defence Academy, Kaduna and fought during the Nigerian Civil War. He later attended the US Army School of Infantry, the Command and Staff College, Jaji (1980–1981) and the National Institute for Policy and Strategic Studies, Kuru.

While serving in the military, Diya studied law at Ahmadu Bello University, Zaria, where he obtained an LLB degree, and then at the Nigerian Law School, where he was called to bar as Solicitor and Advocate of the Supreme Court of Nigeria.

Diya was Commander 31, Airborne Brigade. He was appointed Military Governor of Ogun State from January 1984 to August 1985. He became General Officer Commanding 82 Division, Nigeria Army in 1985. Diya was Commandant, National War College (1991–1993) and then was appointed Chief of Defence Staff.

== Chief of General Staff ==
Diya was appointed Chief of General Staff in 1993 and Vice Chairman of the Provisional Ruling Council in 1994. As Chief of the General Staff, he was the de facto Vice President of Nigeria during the Sani Abacha military junta from 1994 until he was arrested for treason in 1997. His Principal Staff Officer during this period was Bode George.

== 1997 coup plot ==
In 1997 Diya and dissident soldiers in the military allegedly planned to overthrow the regime of Sani Abacha. The alleged coup was uncovered by forces loyal to Abacha, and Diya and his cohorts were jailed. Diya was tried in a military tribunal and was given the death penalty. Upon the untimely death of Abacha in 1998, Diya was pardoned by the late Head of State's successor, Abdusalami Abubakar.

Most people believed that the much-hyped coup was, in fact, a ploy by Abacha to do away with Diya, who was increasingly becoming popular among the elite and opposition parties, for his moderate views on the situation in Nigeria. Earlier on, Abacha's loyalists had twice attempted to assassinate Diya, once at the airport and then in the streets, using bombs. But most analysts said that whether motivated by a real coup plot or not, the arrest of General Diya signalled deep divisions within the Nigerian military and reflected rising tensions over General Abacha's apparent intention to remain in office by engineering his own election as President.

The fact that General Diya and almost all of the others arrested were ethnic Yoruba from the already deeply disaffected southwest was seen by some as a virtual provocation at a time when a country of powerful regional rivalries was entering into a period of renewed civilian politicking. General Abacha, like his inner core of senior officers and much of the army's rank and file, was a Hausa-speaking northerner of Kanuri origin.

== Death sentence ==
After his arrest, a military tribunal sitting in the Nigerian town of Jos sentenced six people including Lieutenant General Oladipo Diya to death by firing squad in April 1998. The accused were brought to the main military barracks in Jos for the trial. Security was tight, and the men on trial were chained at their ankles during the proceedings. In a dramatic statement at the outset of the trial, General Diya asserted that he had been entrapped by another officer close to General Abacha, Gen. Ishaya Bamaiyi, who approached him with the idea of mounting a coup. Given the explosive nature of the charge, the government then closed the trial to the public.

The head of the military tribunal, General Victor Malu, the former commander of the West African regional peacekeeping force ECOMOG, responding to Lieutenant General Diya's defence that people at the very top framed him, said it was not necessary to know who had initiated the conspiracy. He noted that all Lieutenant General Diya had to do was prove that he had not been part of the plot at any stage. General Malu assured the defendants that they would be given a fair trial and unlimited access to information they needed to defend themselves. "This tribunal will not conduct or tolerate a trial by ambush", he said.

The South African government questioned the secrecy surrounding the trial and warned of the probability that there could be an unfavorable reaction, both in Nigeria and internationally, to a carrying out of the sentences.

The sentence was later commuted by the head of state, Abdusalami Abubakar, who succeeded General Abacha.

Lieutenant General Diya was not only released but also discharged from the army, stripped of his rank, and barred from using his military title.

== Later career ==
Following his release, General Diya refused to co-operate with any investigations by Oputa Panel into his activities while he was vice president. He spent most of his time attempting to recover possession of various properties seized by the government on his arrest. He made no attempt to explain how he purchased these lavish properties on the salary of a lieutenant general.

On 18 May 2020, General Diya's second wife Folashade Diya died a few days prior to her 65th birthday. It was reported that she died from COVID-19 complications.

He died in March 2023.
