= Chikadibia Isaac Obiakor =

Nigerian army general (1951–2026)

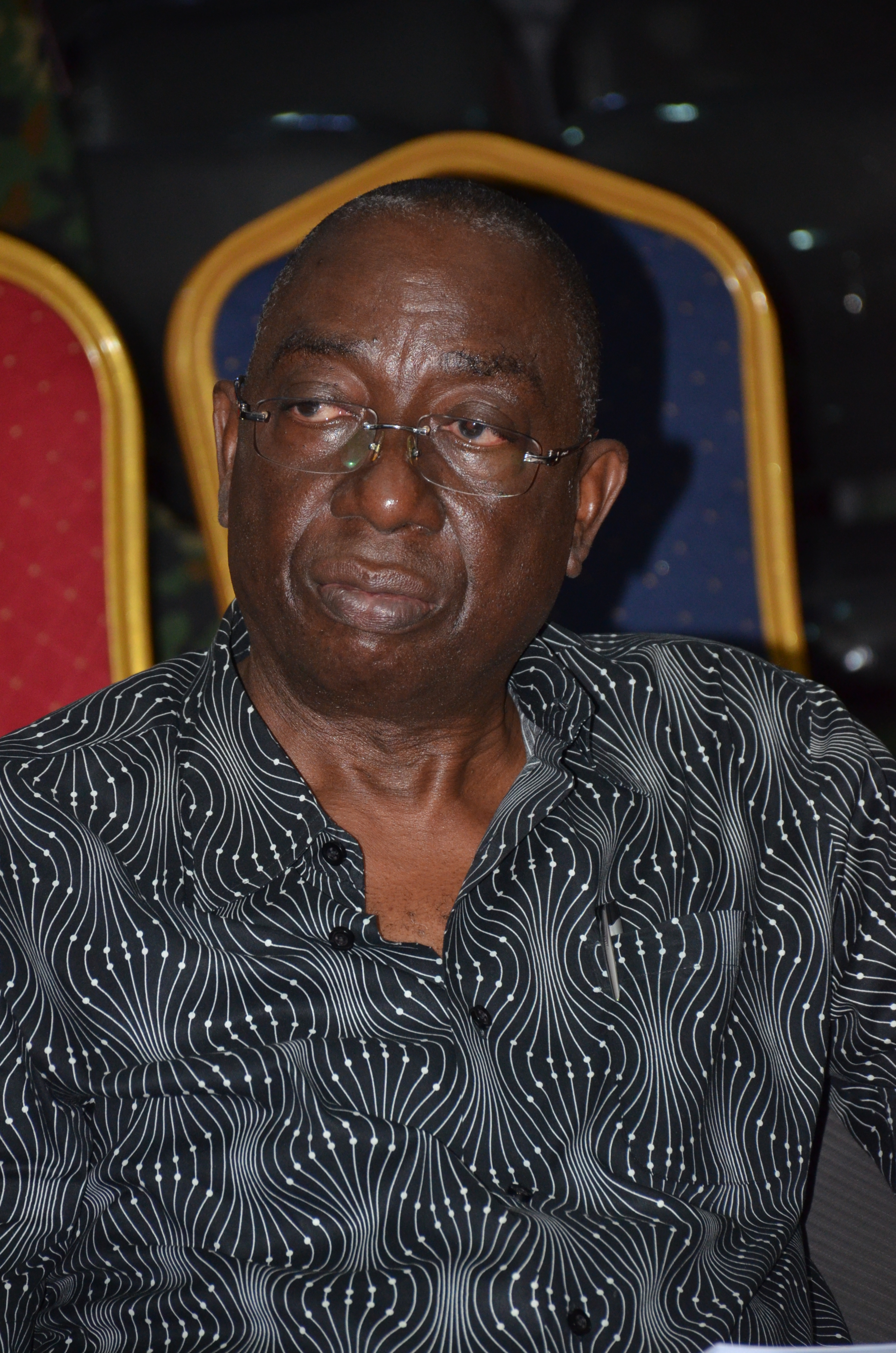
- Obiakor in 2017
- Born: 18 February 1951; Zaria, Northern Region, Colony and Protectorate of Nigeria (now in Kaduna State, Nigeria)
- Died: 27 May 2026 (aged 75); Abuja, Nigeria
- Military career
- Allegiance: Nigeria
- Branch: Nigerian Army
- Service years: 1971–2011
- Rank: Lieutenant general

Lieutenant General Chikadibia Isaac Obiakor // OFR FSS MSS DSS CMH IG QS psc(+) GFISMN NPOM (18 February 1951 – 27 May 2026) was a Nigerian army lieutenant general who until 2010 served as Military Adviser, Assistant Secretary General Office of Military Affairs, United Nations Department of Peace Keeping Operations (UNDPKO), UN Headquarters New York. He retired officially from the Nigerian Army in 2011.

Previously, he was the Force Commander of the United Nations Mission in Liberia (UNMIL), a position UN Secretary-General Kofi Annan appointed him to in January 2006.

== Early life ==
Isaac Obiakor hailed from Awka-South Local Government Area in Anambra State, Nigeria. He was born on 18 February 1951 in Zaria, Kaduna State, into the family of Mr. and Mrs. Robert Echetebu Obiakor. His father was a fireman at the Nigerian Railway Corporation before he joined the Federal Ministry of Works as an Artisan Grade I Engine Driver Water Works until he retired in 1961. He was one of the ten children born into the family.

For his primary school studies, he attended St. Bartholomews Primary School, Wusasa, Zaria, and proceeded to the Nigerian Military School (NMS) Zaria in January 1963. By the time he was in Class 3, he was the school high jumper and also played basketball for the school.

The January 1966 coup took place while he was in school in Zaria. He was one of those deployed to help maintain peace during one of the pre-Civil War riots in Zaria in May 1966.

He was in transit to the East with other students on 27 July 1966 unaware of the counter-coup going on.

Late C. Odumegwu Ojukwu, then Military Governor of Eastern Region ordered that they should not go back to the North and directed that they should be deployed to government schools in the East where they had military cadet corps. Obiakor found himself at Government College Umuahia, where he continued his education up till 1967.

With the outbreak of the Civil War in 1967, Obiakor fought on the Biafran side, and rose to the rank of captain. At the end of the war, he managed to re-establish contact with the Commandant of the Nigerian Military School who immediately intervened to ensure that all the NMS boys who fought on the Biafran side were released without delay and allowed to return to the school to complete their training.

Obiakor returned to NMS Zaria in April 1970. The same year, he wrote his School Certificate Examination as well as the entrance examination into the Nigerian Defence Academy (NDA). He passed the exams in May 1971 and was admitted as a member of the 10th Regular Course of the NDA.

== Military career ==
Obiakor started his military career with the Nigerian Army in 1973. He has served as the Commander of the Economic Community of West African States Monitoring Group (ECOMOG) Artillery Brigade in Liberia (1996 and 1997), the ECOMOG Chief Coordinator of the Liberian elections in July 1997, and as the General Officer Commanding, Second Mechanized Division of the Nigerian Army. In the year 2001 he became Chief of Administration of the Nigerian Army, in charge of the welfare, discipline and medical services for all Nigerian military personnel.

He was a graduate of the National War College in Abuja. Obiakor obtained a Master of Science degree in strategic studies from the University of Ibadan in Nigeria and has participated in numerous international military courses.

=== Accomplishments ===
For his diligence and valor in service, Obiakor was decorated with the following medals and honors; Force Service Star (FSS), Meritorious Service Star (MSS), Distinguished Service Star (DSS), Corps Medal of Honor (CMH), ECOMOG Medal, United Nations Mission in Liberia Medal (x5), United Nations Medal (x5), Republic Medal, Civil War Medal, Defence Service Medal, Good Conduct Medal, Silver Jubilee Medal, General Operations Medal Golden Jubilee Medal, Instructor Gunner (IG), Qualified Staff (QS), PSC (+) Command and Staff College Nigeria, PSC (+) Command Staff College Ghana, PSC Army Command and Staff College Indonesia, Fellow War College (+), Grand Fellow Institute of Strategic Management Nigeria (GFISMN), NPOM National Productivity Order of Merit Award Nigeria.

== Life after the military ==
Obiakor was the Chairman of the United Nations Board of Inquiry in South Sudan on the downing of a United Nations plane in December 2012. and Chairman of a United Nations Board of Inquiry in Abiyei, Sudan. He was also a member of the Peacekeeping Training Programme Advisory Board of the United Nations Institute for Training and Research.

He chaired Nigeria's Whitepaper Drafting Committee on the revised Nigerian National Defence Policy (NNDP) 2015 which was directed at making recommendations to the Nigerian government on how to implement the revised Defence Policy, which dealt largely with contemporary security challenges and production of national defence needs and development in Nigeria.

Obiakor was awarded the Nigerian National Honour of Officer of the Federal Republic (OFR) in 2014.

He was one of the eminent Nigerians invited to witness the signing of a Peace Pact by the 14 Presidential aspirants in January 2015 before the 2015 General Elections at a session chaired by former Commonwealth Secretary General Emeka Anyaokwu with a keynote address delivered by Mr. Kofi Annan, a former United Nations Secretary-General.

In September 2017, he was decorated alongside four other alumni of the elite Nigerian Military School Zaria - Maj. Gen. IBM Haruna (rtd.), Col. Musa Shehu (rtd.), Col. John Okoli (rtd.) and Gp. Capt. Yakubu Suleiman (rtd.) - as a Patron of the FCT Chapter of the school's Alumni Association.

Obiakor was Chairman, UN Board of Inquiry into the Killing of Burundian Refugees in Kamanyola, DRC in 2018, and Chairman, UN Secretary General Board of Inquiry to Investigate the Destruction of Humanitarian Structures and Facilities in North West Syria in 2019–2020.

Obiakor died on 27 May 2026, at the age of 75.
