= Kenneth Minimah =

19th Chief of Army Staff (Nigeria)

Lieutenant general Kenneth Minimah CFR GSS, psc(+), fwc

Chief of Army Staff
- In office January 2014 – July 2015
- Preceded by: Lt-Gen. A. Ihejirika
- Succeeded by: Lt-Gen. T.Y. Buratai

General Officer Commanding 81 Division, Lagos Garrison Command
- In office 2010–2013
- Preceded by: Maj-Gen E. Nwanjuma
- Succeeded by: Maj-Gen O.A Umahi

Personal details
- Born: 27 July 1959 (age 67) Opobo, Eastern Region, British Nigeria (now in Rivers State, Nigeria)
- Relations: Felly Elimabha Minimah (Spouse)
- Education: Nigerian Defence Academy; University of Ibadan
- Awards: Commander of the Federal Republic, CFR

Military service
- Allegiance: Nigeria
- Branch/service: Nigerian Army
- Years of service: 1979–2015
- Rank: Lieutenant general
- Unit: 81 Division
- Commands: 149 Infantry Battalion
- Battles/wars: Boko Haram Insurgency War

Kenneth Minimah, CFR GSS, psc(+), fwc (born 27 July 1959) is a retired Nigerian army lieutenant general who served as Nigeria's Chief of Army Staff (COAS).

== Early life ==
Kenneth T. J. Minimah was born on 27 July 1959 in Opobo Kingdom, Rivers State, Nigeria. He attended Township Primary School in Opobo between 1965 and 1971 and Baptist High School for his secondary education from 1972 to 1977. He later attended the College of Science and Technology, Port Harcourt. He was admitted into the Nigerian Defence Academy on 3 January 1979 and was commissioned as a second lieutenant into the Corps of Nigerian infantry on 18 December 1981. He obtained a Bachelor of Arts (B.A.) degree in international studies and a Master of Science (M.Sc.) degree in strategic studies from the University of Ibadan.

== Military life ==
He served at different levels in the Nigerian Army before he was appointed Chief of Army Staff (COAS). He served as the General Officer Commanding 81 Division, Commanding Officer of the 149 Infantry Battalion, Commanding Officer of the Nigerian Battalion 2, Commandant Officer of the Nigerian Army School of Infantry and as the Director of Standards and Combat Readiness.

== Medals and awards ==
He has been the recipient of several medals. He has received the Commander of the Federal Republic, CFR, as well as several designations from the Nigerian Army, including the Meritorious Service Star (MSS), Forces Service Star (FSS), Passed Staff College Dagger (psc(+)), and the Distinguished Service Star (DSS).
