= Faruk Yahaya =

22nd Chief of Army Staff (Nigeria)

Lieutenant General Faruk Yahaya CFR psc(+) NAM GSS ndc (Chile) FCMH GSMH MIAD

Chief of Army Staff
- In office 27 May 2021 – 23 June 2023
- President: Muhammadu Buhari; Bola Tinubu
- Preceded by: Ibrahim Attahiru
- Succeeded by: Taoreed Lagbaja

Personal details
- Born: 5 January 1966 (age 60) Sifawa Bodinga, Northern Region, Nigeria (now in Sokoto State, Nigeria)
- Education: Nigerian Defence Academy; Salford University

Military service
- Allegiance: Nigeria
- Branch/service: Nigerian Army
- Years of service: 1985–2023
- Rank: Lieutenant general

Faruk Yahaya CFR psc(+) NAM GSS ndc (Chile) FCMH GSMH MIAD (born 5 January 1966) is a retired Nigerian army lieutenant general and a former Chief of Army Staff of Nigeria, appointed by President Muhammadu Buhari on 27 May 2021. after the death of the former Chief of Army Staff, Ibrahim Attahiru who died in the Beechcraft King Air 350i plane crash near Kaduna International Airport.

== Early life ==
Faruk Yahaya was born on 5 January 1966 in Sifawa, Bodinga Local Government Area of Sokoto State. He is a graduate of the Nigerian Defence Academy 37 regular course, Armed Forces Command and Staff College, and Nigerian Army School of Infantry. He commenced officer cadet training on 27 September 1985 and was commissioned into the Nigerian Army Corps of Infantry as a Second lieutenant on 27 December 1990. He holds a master's degree in International Affairs and Diplomacy.

== Military career ==
Lt Gen Faruk Yahaya has attended all the relevant courses commensurate to his career which include, Young Officers Course, Infantry, Company Commanders Course, Infantry and Commanding Officers Course. He also attended Junior Staff Course, Senior Staff Course and National Defence College amongst other, as well as several workshops and Seminars.

He has also held several appointments including Command, Staff and Instructional. Notable amongst them are Guards Brigade Garrison Commander, Directing Staff at the Armed Forces Command and Staff College (AFCSC), Deputy Director Army Headquarters Department of Military Secretary, Deputy Director Army Research and Development and Chief of Staff, Headquarters Joint Task Force Operation "Pulo Shield".

The Chief of Army Staff (COAS) has served as the Principal General Staff Officer (PGSO) to Honourable Minister of Defence, Commander, 4 Brigade and 29 Task Force Brigade (Operation "Zaman Lafiya"). He was also Director Manpower at the Army Headquarter, Military Secretary Army Headquarters and General Officer Commanding (GOC) 1 Division of the Nigerian Army.

Until his appointment as the COAS, Lt Gen Faruk Yahaya was the Theatre Commander of the Operation "Hadin Kai", responsible for Counter Terrorism and Counter Insurgency operations in North East Nigeria.

== Major Achievements as Chief of Army Staff ==
During his tenure as the Chief of Army Staff (COAS) from May 2021 to June 2023 he focused heavily on infractural development and personal welfare, across the Nigerian Army such as. The relevance of modern equipment that provides superior firepower, excellent mobility, force protection, precision fire control and other capabilities necessary to operate in the contemporary battle space were exemplified across numerous theatres. To enhance operational effectiveness of the Nigerian Army, General Yahaya embarked on a systematic effects-based procurement of arms, ammunition, and combat fighting equipment including the Turkish Bayraktar BB2 Unmanned Aerial Vehicles (UAVs) which became a potent force enabler accounting for many operational successes of the Nigerian Army till date. His effective efforts in handling the violent secessionist agitations of the Indigenous People of Biafra stabilized the South East region that ensured the peaceful conduct of the 2023 General Elections in the region. With the Army under his watch, the 2023 General Elections were peacefully and successfully conducted across the nation with no complaints, blames or accusing fingers pointing at the Army but rather kudos and commendations for the professional conduct of troops during the election in support of the Police and the Civil Authority. General Yahaya improved the standard of welfare of personnel and their families that complement the readiness of force through improvement of barrack amenities and development of business opportunities under the Barracks Investment Initiative Programme (BIIP).

Gen Yahaya introduced the COAS Personnel Loan Scheme where personnel can access soft loans within 24 hours of submitting application. He also introduced the Affordable Home Ownership Option for All (AHOOA) soldiers. It is to Gen Yahaya's credit the introduction of the Nigerian Army Insurance Scheme which pays affected troops and families their benefits instantly in order to complement the existing Group Life Assurance Policy of the Armed Forces. To safeguard troops and ease their transportation in volatile areas, he introduced a fortnightly welfare flights for movement of personnel in and out of the North East Theatre of Operation. This greatly eliminated the hitherto experiences of troops falling into targeted attacks and abductions by Boko Haram insurgents while on welfare pass. Other areas he gave priority to improve troops welfare and wellbeing include the equipping and provision of adequate medical facilities in the Nigerian Army Reference Hospitals in Lagos, Kaduna, Port Harcourt, Benin and Maiduguri to effectively cater for troops’ casualties and family health. New formations and Units such as 12 Brigade in Lokoja and 37 Demonstration Battalion in the Nigerian Defence Academy Kaduna as well as several Forward Operation Bases (FOBs) were also established and operationalized in relevant parts of the country to improve national security. Looking into the future for the Nigerian Army, Gen Yahaya established the Nigerian Heritage and Future Centre (NAHFC). The focus of the NAHFC was to continuously look for ways to improve the professional competence, capacity and effectiveness of the Nigerian Army now and in the future. The NAHFC is a ‘Professional Think-Tank’ of the Nigerian Army designed to act as ‘Loyal Opposition’ to keep the Army in track professionally now and into the future. The NAHFC is designed to constantly look for ways and means to put the Nigerian Army professionally ahead of its constitutional Mandate.

== Awards and honours ==
Faruk Yahaya holds several honours and awards, some of which include,

- Nigerian Army Medal,
- Grand Service Star,
- Command Medal.
- Forces Service Star.
- Silver Jubilee Medal.
- Golden Jubilee Medal.
- Meritorious Service Star.
- General Operation Medal.
- Distinguished Service Star.
- Economics Community of West African State Monitoring Group Medal.
- Passed staff course Dagger, *National Defence College (Chile),
- Field Command Medal of Honour,
- General Staff Medal of Honour and several other numerous medals, honours and awards.
- The highest honorary academic distinction of Doctor of Science (D.Sc.) Honoris Causa by the prestigious Usmanu Danfodio University, Sokoto, on 6 September 2025.

== Traditional Titles ==
- Zarumman Sokoto.
- Dike Ogu of Imo.

== Publications ==
- Counter Terrorism and Counter Insurgency Theory Meets Practice; By Lt General Farouk Yahaya.

== Philanthropy ==
In his current retirement life, the Zarumma Sakkwato has continued to live a modest life while making positive impacts on his community, Sokoto State and humanity in general. General Yahaya is the Chairman Hajiya Fatima Yahaya Foundation. The Foundation is a broad-based organization designed to provide array of services in relevant areas that will support and help humanity. The Foundation established the Fatima College of Nursing Sciences Sifawa which has a 150-bed capacity Fatima Yahaya Hospital Sifawa, Fatima Yahaya International School, Fatima Yahaya Tahfiz Islamiyya School for Islamic education and especially memorization of the Holy Qur’an, Malam Yahaya Islamic Library, and Zauren Malam Yahaya. The Zauren Malam Yahaya is school designed in a typical Zaure school model, a replica of the Zaure school which his Late father Malam Yahaya operated then in Sifawa. The Foundation also established the Malam Yahaya Digital Technology Centre equipped with over 300 computers designed to bring Information, Communication and Technology home to Sifawa.

== Personal life ==
Yahaya is married to Hajiya Salamatu Faruk Yahaya and is blessed with four children.
