= Luka Yusuf =

16th Chief of Army Staff (Nigeria)

Lieutenant general Luka Yusuf CFR GSS GPP DSO psc(+) fwc Msc

Chief of Army Staff
- In office May 2007 – August 2008
- President: Umaru Musa Yar'Adua
- Preceded by: O.A. Azazi
- Succeeded by: A.B. Dambazau

Command Officer in Charge of the Armed Forces of Liberia
- In office February 2006 – May 2007
- President: Ellen Johnson Sirleaf
- Succeeded by: Suraj Abdurrahman

Personal details
- Born: 22 September 1952 Bara-Kagoma, Northern Region, British Nigeria (now in Kaduna State, Nigeria)
- Died: 2 June 2009 (aged 56) London, England
- Education: Nigerian Defence Academy

Military service
- Allegiance: Nigeria
- Branch/service: Nigerian Army
- Rank: Lieutenant general
- Commands: Commander, Nigerian Military Continent to United Nations Mission in Sierra Leone (UNAMSIL) Commander, Armed Forces of Liberia (2006-2007)

Luka Nyeh Yusuf CFR GSS GPP DSO psc(+) fwc Msc (22 September 1952 – 2 June 2009) was a Nigerian army lieutenant general who served as Chief of Army Staff (COAS) from 2007 to 2008. He succeeded Owoye Andrew Azazi as Chief of Army Staff.

== Education and background ==
Yusuf was born on September 22, 1952, in Bara-Kagoma, Kaduna State. He attended the Nigerian Defence Academy (NDA) and was commissioned as a 2nd Lieutenant into the Nigerian Army Artillery Corps in 1975 and was a member of the Nigerian Defence Academy (NDA) Course 14. Others in his NDA class were officers such as former Chief of Defence Staff, Air Chief Marshal Paul Dike

== Career ==
Yusuf served as Commander of the Nigerian military contingent to United Nations Mission in Sierra Leone (UNAMSIL) before being appointed in 2006 as Commander in Charge of the Armed Forces of Liberia by Liberian President Ellen Johnson Sirleaf. Upon Yusuf's appointment as Nigeria's Chief of Army Staff by President Umaru Yar Adua in 2007, Liberia's President awarded General Yusuf with Liberia's Honor of Distinguished Service.

Yusuf has been quoted in saying he is fulfilled with his military career.

== Death ==
Yusuf died in London on June 2, 2009, after a protracted illness at the age of 56
