= Doka =

Doka may refer to:

- Doka Group, an international supplier of prefabricated formwork
- Doka, Nigeria, headquarters of Kaduna North Local Government Area
- DOKA Studios, a Russian video game developer and publisher.
- Doka, Sudan, Al Qadarif (state), a village in eastern Sudan
- Doka, a dialect of the Miship language, spoken in Nigeria
- Francisco Lima da Silva, Brazilian footballer nicknamed Doka
- The German name (shortened version of Dopplekabin) for the crew cab / double cab version of a pickup, often used worldwide by the fans of the double cab version of the Volkswagen Type 2 pickup

== See also ==
- Donka (disambiguation)
