= Victor Malu =

Nigerian general (1947–2017)

Lieutenant general Victor Samuel Leonard Malu

Chief of Army Staff
- In office May 1999 – April 2001
- Preceded by: Lt-Gen. I. Bamaiyi
- Succeeded by: Lt-Gen. A.O. Ogomudia

Commander, Lagos Garrison Command Nigerian Army
- In office October 1998 – May 1999

General Officer Commanding 2nd Mechanised Infantry Division Nigerian Army
- In office August 1998 – October 1998
- Preceded by: Maj-Gen. B.S. Magashi
- Succeeded by: Maj-Gen. F.A. Mujakperuo

Commander, ECOMOG Peacekeeping Force, Sierra Leone
- In office August 1996 – January 1998
- Preceded by: Maj-Gen. J.M. Inienger
- Succeeded by: Maj-Gen. T. Shelpidi

Personal details
- Born: 15 January 1947 Katsina-Ala, Benue State, Nigeria
- Died: 9 October 2017 (aged 70) Cairo, Egypt
- Education: Nigerian Defence Academy Command and Staff College, Jaji

Military service
- Allegiance: Nigeria
- Branch/service: Nigerian Army
- Rank: Lieutenant general

Victor Samuel Leonard Malu (15 January 1947 – 9 October 2017) DSS mni fwc psc was Nigeria's Chief of Army Staff (COAS) from 1999 to 2001 and Force Commander of the ECOMOG peace-keeping force in Liberia from 1996 to 1998.

== Birth and education ==
Malu was born on 15 January 1947 at Katsina-Ala, Benue State of Tiv origins. He enrolled in the Nigerian Defence Academy, Kaduna in 1967 as part of the 3rd Regular Course and was commissioned as a 2nd Lieutenant enlisted upon graduation in 1970. Other officers in the NDA 3rd Regular Course included Senator and retired Brig-Gen. David Mark, Gen. Tunde Ogbeha, Gen.Raji Rasaki, Gen. Chris Garuba, Gen. Abdulkareem Adisa, Brig-Gen. Halilu Akilu, Adm. Mike Akhigbe and Gen. Tunji Olurin.

Later he attended Command and Staff College, Jaji and the National Institute of Policy and Strategic Studies, Kuru, Jos.

== Military career ==
At the time of the February 1976 coup when General Olusegun Obasanjo took power, Malu was chief instructor of the Nigerian Military School, Zaria. After the coup, Malu was interrogated for two weeks but released.

Malu became General Officer Training, Army Headquarters and Commander, 7 Mechanised Brigade.

He chaired the tribunal that tried General Oladipo Diya and other officers for attempting to overthrow the Sani Abacha regime in 1997.

Malu was commander of the Economic Community of West African States (ECOWAS) peace-keeping force ECOMOG from December 1996 to April 1998 during the First Liberian Civil War.

Malu impressed both Liberians and international observers with the improvements that followed his taking command.

By March 1997 he was able to claim that Liberia was completely cleared of land mines. He fell out with Liberian President Charles Taylor, who in April 1998 accused him of trying to run a parallel government. It was due to this rift that Malu was replaced as commander. In a book he wrote later, cited at Taylor's trial in The Hague, Malu reportedly claimed that in 1997 Taylor secretly smuggled arms and ammunition from South Africa through Monrovia without informing ECOMOG peacekeepers.

Malu was appointed Chief of Army Staff in May 1999 at the start of President Olusegun Obasanjo's administration and was dismissed in April 2001.

Later, Malu said he warned President Olusegun Obasanjo to guard against American involvement in the nation's affairs, saying they were only aiming to further their own interests. He claimed that it was because the Americans disliked his views that Obasanjo fired him before the signing of the Nigerian-United States Military Cooperation Agreement.

He was awarded Force Service Star (FSS) Award, Meritorious Service Star (MSS) Award, and Distinguished Service Star (DSS) Award.

== Post military career ==
In October 2001 there were protests by Tiv people in Zaki Biam, Katsina-Ala local government, Benue State. 19 soldiers sent to restore peace were killed.

In retaliation, the army allegedly massacred 100 people. Malu said armed men burst into his own home and killed four of his household before burning down neighbouring houses.

In July 2005 Malu complained that the government was persecuting him. He said the State Security Services had seized his passport on the basis that he had been "going to Paris frequently and was holding meetings with people who do not mean well for the country." He also said that his military service records had been declared missing and he was not getting fair treatment over his pension. In January 2006 he caused controversy when he spoke at a meeting of the Arewa Consultative Forum in Kaduna, saying he regretted not having overthrown Obasanjo's government while he was COAS. The president's Public Affairs Assistant, Femi Fani-Kayode, said Malu’s statement was treasonable.

In September 2008 Malu, a diabetic, went into a coma and was rushed to Lagos University Teaching Hospital where he was placed on life support in the intensive care unit. Later he was transferred to a hospital in London, and after treatment for stroke was discharged from hospital to his Central London home in April 2009.

Malu died on 9 October 2017 at the age of 70.

== See also ==
- Victor Malu Military Tribunal
