= Tukur Yusufu Buratai =

20th Chief of Army Staff (Nigeria)

Lieutenant general Tukur Yusuf Buratai CFR psc(+) NAM GSS ndc (BD)
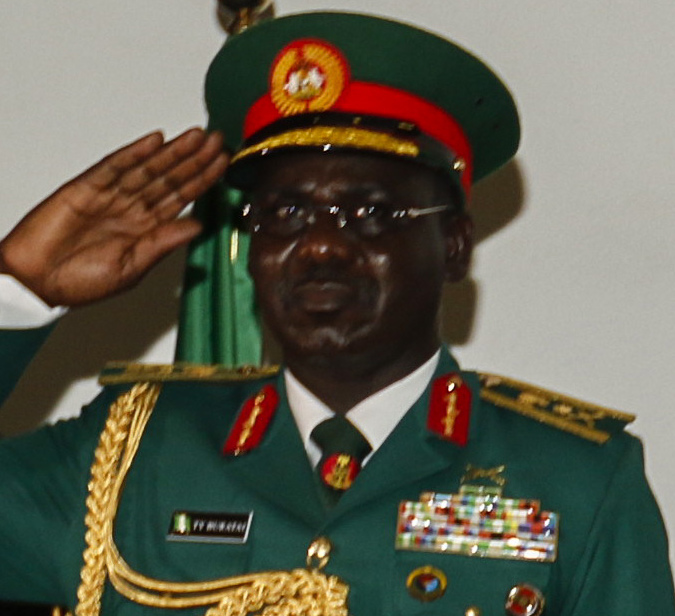
- Buratai in 2018

Chief of Army Staff
- In office 16 July 2015 – 28 January 2021
- Preceded by: Lt-Gen. Kenneth Minimah
- Succeeded by: Lt-Gen. Ibrahim Attahiru

Commander, Multinational Joint Task Force
- In office May 2014 – July 2015
- Preceded by: Brig-Gen. E. Ransome-Kuti
- Succeeded by: Maj-Gen. Iliya Abbah

Personal details
- Born: 24 November 1960 (age 65)
- Education: Nigerian Defence Academy; University of Maiduguri

Military service
- Allegiance: Nigeria
- Branch/service: Nigerian Army
- Years of service: 1981 – 2021
- Rank: Lieutenant general
- Commands: Multinational Joint Task Force
- Battles/wars: Boko Haram Insurgency War; Conflict in the Niger Delta

Tukur Yusuf Buratai CFR psc(+) NAM GSS ndc (BD) (born 24 November 1960) is a retired Nigerian army lieutenant general, former Chief of Army Staff (appointed by President Muhammadu Buhari in July 2015), and Nigeria's Ambassador to the Republic of Benin. He was commissioned into the Nigerian Army in 1983 and has had multiple command, administrative, and instructional appointments.

== Background and education ==
General Buratai is from Buratai town, Biu Local Government Area of Borno State. His father, Yusuf Buratai, was a non commissioned officer in the Royal West African Frontier Force and World War II veteran who fought in Burma. General Buratai had his primary education at Buratai town and thereafter gained admission to Government Teachers College Potiskum, Yobe State, where he graduated with distinction.

== Military career ==
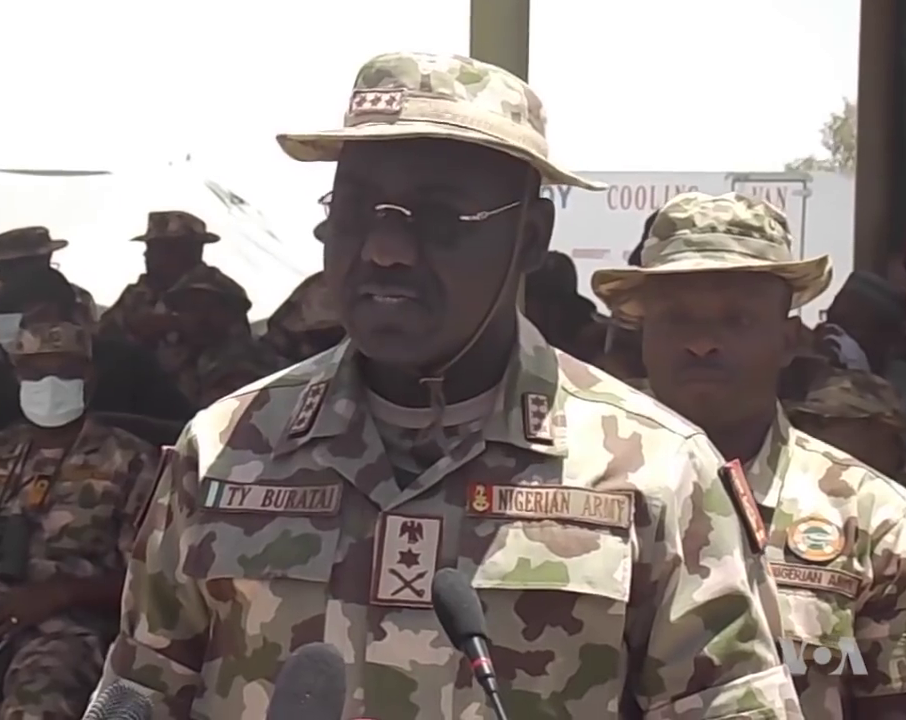
Lt. General T.Y. Buratai in Sambisa Forest, 2017

In January 1981, Buratai attended the Nigerian Defence Academy Kaduna as a member of Burma battalion of the 29 Regular Combatant Course (29 RC) where he was given the prestigious appointment of Cadet Sergeant Major (CSM). On successful completion of his Officer Cadet training, he was commissioned as a Second Lieutenant on 17 December 1983 into the Infantry Corps of the Nigerian Army. Buratai has a degree in history from University of Maiduguri and a degree in philosophy from Bangladesh University of Professionals, Dhaka. He is also a graduate of National Defence College, Mirpur, Bangladesh.

He served in 26 Amphibious Battalion Elele, Port Harcourt, Military Observer at the United Nations Verification Mission II in Angola; later 26 Guards Battalion, Lagos; Lagos Garrison Command Camp. Lt Gen Buratai also served as administrative officer at the State House, Abuja; 82 Motorized Battalion; 81 Battalion, Bakassi Peninsular; Army Headquarters Garrison, Abuja before he became a Directing Staff at the Armed Forces Command and Staff College, Jaji, earning the prestigious "Pass Staff College Dagger" (psc(+)) appellation.

Subsequently, he served at AHQ Dept of Army Policy and Plans, Abuja; Assistant Chief of Staff Administrative Matters, HQ Infantry Centre Jaji. Additionally, he was again at the Armed Forces Command and Staff College as Director Dept of Land Warfare from where he was appointed Commander 2 Brigade, Port Harcourt, doubling as Commander, Sector 2 JTF Operation PULO SHIELD. Upon promotion to the rank of Major General, he was appointed Commandant, Nigerian Army School of Infantry, Jaji; thereafter he was appointed Director of Procurement DHQ before being appointed Force Commander of the newly reconstituted Multinational Joint Task Force (MJTNF) under the auspices of the Lake Chad Basin Commission and the Benin Republic, an appointment he held till he became Chief of Army Staff.

His operational deployments include Military Observer at the United Nations Verification Mission II in Angola, Op HARMONY IV in the Bakassi Peninsular, OP MESA, Op PULO SHIELD, Op SAFE CONDUCT, MNJTF, Op ZAMAN LAFIYA, and Op LAFIYA DOLE. He was appointed Chief of Army Staff on 13 July 2015.

Tukur Buratai was rumoured to have been replaced by President Buhari following the promotion of Maj.-Gen. L.O Adeosun to Lieutenant General, making him of the same rank with Buratai. But the report was immediately debunked by the Army. General Tukur Buratai was eventually removed by President Buhari on January 26, 2021 after widespread calls for the removal of service chiefs due to the worsening security situation in the country during their time of Service.

== Dates of promotion ==
Buratai's promotion dates are

Year	Insignia	Rank
December 1983		Second lieutenant (Commissioned)
1985		Lieutenant
1989		Captain
1994		Major
1998		Lieutenant colonel
2004		Colonel
2009		Brigadier general
2012		Major general
August 2015		Lieutenant general

== Awards ==
Lt Gen Buratai's honors and awards include:

- Forces Service Star (FSS)
- Meritorious Service Star (MSS)
- Distinguished Service Star (DSS)
- Grand Service Star (GSS).
- Pass Staff Course Dagger (psc(+))
- Field Command Medal
- Training Support Medal
- United Nations Medal for Angolan Verification Medal II
- 2022 – Commander of the Order of the Federal Republic (CFR)
