= Ipoola Alani Akinrinade =

1st Chief of Defence Staff of Nigeria (born 1939)

Lieutenant general Ipoola Alani Akinrinade CFR FSS

Chief of Defence Staff
- In office 15 April 1980 – 2 October 1981
- Preceded by: Position established
- Succeeded by: Gibson Jalo

Chief of Army Staff
- In office 2 October 1979 – 15 April 1980
- Preceded by: Theophilus Danjuma
- Succeeded by: Gibson Jalo

Personal details
- Born: 3 October 1939 (age 86) Ile Ife, Southern Region, British Nigeria (now in Osun State, Nigeria)
- Education: Nigerian Defence Academy Royal Military Academy Sandhurst

Military service
- Allegiance: Nigeria
- Branch/service: Nigerian Army
- Rank: Lieutenant general
- Battles/wars: Nigerian Civil War

Lieutenant general Ipoola Alani Akinrinade CFR FSS (born 3 October 1939) is a retired Nigerian military officer who was Chief of Army Staff (COAS) from October 1979 to April 1980, and then Chief of Defence Staff until 1981 during the Nigerian Second Republic.

== Birth and education ==
Akinrinade was born on 3 October 1939 at Yakoyo near Ile Ife, Osun State old Oyo State.

He attended Offa Grammar School for his secondary education (1954–1958).

He worked at the Ministry of Agriculture in the Western Region, Ibadan (1959–1960).

Joining the army, he began officer cadet training at the Royal Nigeria Military Forces Training College, Kaduna in April 1960, then went to the Royal Military Academy Sandhurst in the United Kingdom (August 1960).

He was commissioned as second lieutenant in the Infantry Corps on 20 December 1962.

Later he took the Infantry Officer Career/Airborne Course in the USA (August 1965 - July 1966), attended Staff College Camberley (January - December 1971) and attended the Royal College of Defence Studies in the United Kingdom (January - December 1978).

== Military career ==
Akinrinade rose steadily through the ranks. He was promoted lieutenant on 29 March 1963, captain on 29 Mar 1965, major on 10 June 1967, lieutenant colonel on 11 May 1968, colonel on 1 October 1972, brigadier general on 1 October 1974 and major general on 1 January 1976.

He held various infantry appointments, becoming commander of the Ibadan Garrison (1970–1971) and GOC of 1 Infantry Division (1975–1979).

He was a member of the Supreme Military Council during the military regime of General Murtala Muhammed and Olusegun Obasanjo (1975–1979).

He was promoted to lieutenant general on 2 October 1979 and appointed Chief of Army Staff, and then became Chief of Defence Staff in 1980, during the civilian administration of Shehu Shagari.

He voluntarily retired from service with effect from 2 October 1981.

== Later career ==
After retirement, Akinrinade engaged in large-scale farming and was chairman of Niger Feeds and Agriculture Operations (1982–1985).

In General Ibrahim Babangida's government he was appointed Minister of Agriculture, Water Resources and Rural Development (1985–1986), Minister of Industries (1988 - February 1989) and Minister of Transport (1989).

He became a member of the National Democratic Coalition (NADECO), a pro-democracy group, during the Sani Abacha regime.
