= Salihu Ibrahim =

Nigerian general

Lieutenant general Salihu Ibrahim

Chief of Army Staff
- In office August 1990 – September 1993
- Preceded by: Sani Abacha
- Succeeded by: Aliyu Mohammed Gusau

Commandant of the Nigerian Defence Academy
- In office 1988–1990
- Preceded by: Maj-Gen Peter Adomokai
- Succeeded by: Lt-Gen. Garba Duba

Personal details
- Born: 25 June 1935 Kaduna, Kaduna State, Nigeria Protectorate
- Died: 10 December 2018 (aged 83)

Military service
- Allegiance: Nigeria
- Branch/service: Nigerian Army
- Years of service: 1956 – 1993
- Rank: Lieutenant general

Salihu Ibrahim FSS, FHWC (25 June 1935 – 10 December 2018) was a Nigerian army general who was Chief of Army Staff from August 1990 until September 1993 during the military regime of General Ibrahim Babangida.

== Biography ==
Salihu Ibrahim was in the first Nigerian Defence Academy cohort, trained from 1964-1967. This cohort included other notable officers such as Oladipo Diya, Joshua Dogonyaro, Aliyu Mohammed Gusau, and Mohammed Kaliel. Ibrahim became a respected Armored Corps officer, considered apolitical although he served as a member of Major-General Muhammadu Buhari's Supreme Military Council (1984-1985).

He was briefly arrested in August 1985, during the coup in which Ibrahim Babangida took over from Buhari.

Later he became a member of Babangida's Armed Forces Ruling Council.

He was appointed Commandant of the Nigeria Defence Academy (1988 - 1990).

In August 1990, General Sani Abacha, then Chief of Army staff (COAS) ceded this job to Ibrahim, while remaining Chairman Joint Chiefs and becoming Minister of Defence. Ibrahim was unable to assert much authority, with Abacha even refusing to vacate FlagStaff House, the traditional residence of the COAS. In August 1993, then head of state Ibrahim Babangida appointed Lt. General Aliyu Mohammed as his replacement, but Abacha delayed the change until September to allow Ibrahim time to "retire with honor". After retirement he was appointed a Pro-Chancellor and Chairman of council of the University of Ilorin. He became a member of the board of several Companies. As of 2010 he was Chairman of the International Energy Insurance Company. He died in December 2018 in his home in Kogi State, at the age of 83.
