= Abdulrahman Dambazau =

Nigerian general and politician (born 1954)

Lieutenant General Prof. Abdulrahman Dambazau CFR GSS, psc, ndc, fwc(+)
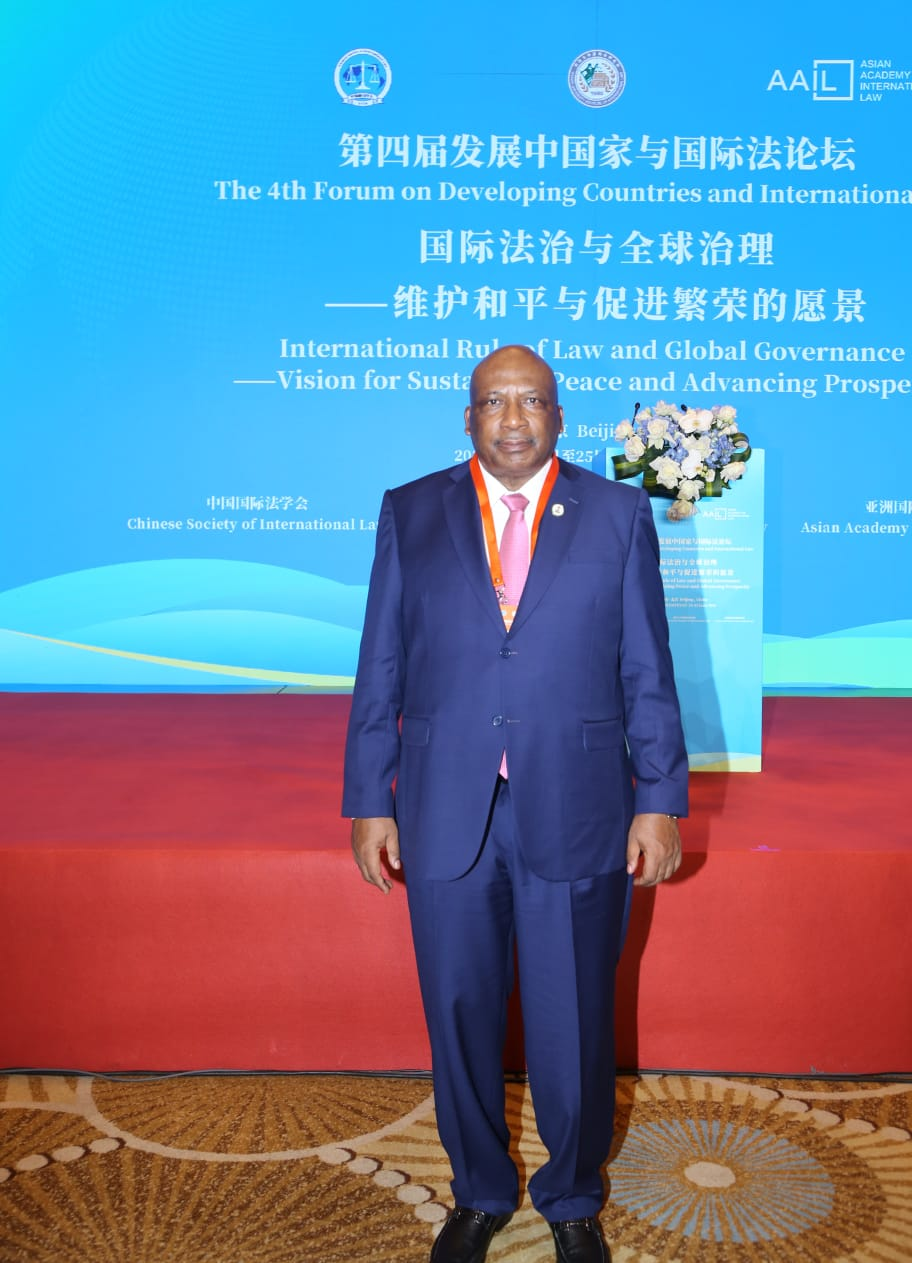

Ambassador Nigeria to China
- Ambassador
- Assumed office TBD
- Appointed by: Bola Ahmed Tinubu

Minister of the Interior
- In office November 2015 – May 2019
- President: Muhammadu Buhari
- Preceded by: Patrick Abba Moro
- Succeeded by: Rauf Aregbesola

Chief of Army Staff
- In office August 2008 – September 2010
- President: Umaru Yar'Adua
- Preceded by: Luka Yusuf
- Succeeded by: Azubuike Ihejirika

Personal details
- Born: 14 March 1954 (age 72) Zaria, Northern Region, British Nigeria (now in Kaduna State, Nigeria)
- Education: Barewa College; Nigerian Defence Academy; Kent State University; University of Keele

Military service
- Allegiance: Nigeria
- Branch/service: Nigerian Army
- Years of service: 1977–2010
- Rank: Lieutenant general

Abdulrahman Bello Dambazau CFR GSS, psc, ndc, fwc(+) (born 14 March 1954) He is currently Nigerian Ambassador to China. He is a retired Nigerian army general and politician who served as Chief of Army Staff from 2008 to 2010 and in President Muhammadu Buhari's Cabinet as Minister of the Interior from 2015 to 2019.

Dambazau is a strategist, especially in national and regional security issues. He is a writer with research in various areas of human behavior. He is a criminologist, with focus on the study and care of victims of crime, disasters and conflicts. He is currently the Pro-chancellor Capital City University Kano.

== Early life ==
=== Family ===
Dambazau was born into a traditional military family of the Fulani Dambazawa clan. His father served in the Colonial Army, and his brothers held senior posts in the army. He also holds the traditional title of Baraden Kano.

=== Education ===
Dambazau's secondary education took place at Barewa College, Zaria, where he graduated in 1974. Later in 1974, he proceeded to the Nigerian Defence Academy as a member of the 17 Regular Combatant Course. He was commissioned as a second lieutenant into the Infantry Corps of the Nigerian Army in June 1977.

In 1979, Dambazau attended the US Army Military Police School at Fort McClellan. Dambazau later obtained a bachelor's degree in criminal justice from Kent State University in 1982 and a PhD in criminology from the University of Keele in 1989.

== Military career ==
=== Command ===
Dambazau served as a military police officer, aide-de-camp to the Chief of Army Staff (1979), commanded military police units and served as a special investigator (1984–1985). Dambazau was registrar of the Nigerian Defence Academy from 1993 to 1999. He also served as chief instructor, Support Weapon Wing of the Infantry Centre and School from 1999 to 2001 and later as directing staff at the National War College from 2004 to 2006. From 2007 to 2008, he served as general officer commanding (GOC) 2nd Division, Ibadan.

=== Chief of Army Staff ===
He was appointed Chief of Army Staff in 2008 by President Umaru Yar'Adua. Towards the end of the Yar'Adua administration, the army was accused of attempts to covertly seize power due to Yar'Adua's illness. After Yar'Adua's death, Dambazau was retired from service by President Goodluck Jonathan.

==== Major achievements ====
1. Nigerian Army Wide Area Network Infrastructure (NAWANI) in 2010.

2. Reconstruction of 44 Army Reference Hospital and upgrade to a Level 4 UN Hospital.

3. Built YarAdua Barracks by Direct Labour using Army Engineers.

4. Expanded the Army Peacekeeping Centre to have capacity to train two battalions simultaneously and got UN recognition as a regional training centre.

5. Revised all Nigerian Army Training Manuals.

6. Laid the foundation of the Counter Terrorism and Counter Insurgency Training Centre Jaji.

== Political career ==
Following his retirement in 2010, Dambazau went into politics, later joining the All Progressives Congress (APC). During the 2015 presidential election, he was the head of the security committee of the APC campaign. He is the Senior Special Adviser to the Presidential Candidate on Strategic Engagement, Presidential Campaign Council (2023). He is the founder and chairman Tinubu 4 Good Governance, for the 2023 Presidential Campaign In Kano State and the northwest in general. He a member,2024 Ondo State National Gubernatorial Council (ONDO-NGCC).

=== Minister of the Interior ===
1. Carried out reforms of the 4 agencies under the Ministry, creating seamless process of career progression, especially for training, appointments and promotions.

2. Introduced biometrics and digitalized the international passport, including advance Travellers information in partnership with the INTERPOL.

3. He redesign the prison system to reduce the population of awaiting trials inmates, by ensuring that they have their days in court without necessary delays due to poor logistics. Procured a lot of vehicles, built 3000-capacity correctional centers, and also ensure that the new Correctional Act was signed into law to refocus the objective of the prison from punishment to treatment and rehabilitation in line with UN Standards (the Mandela Rule).

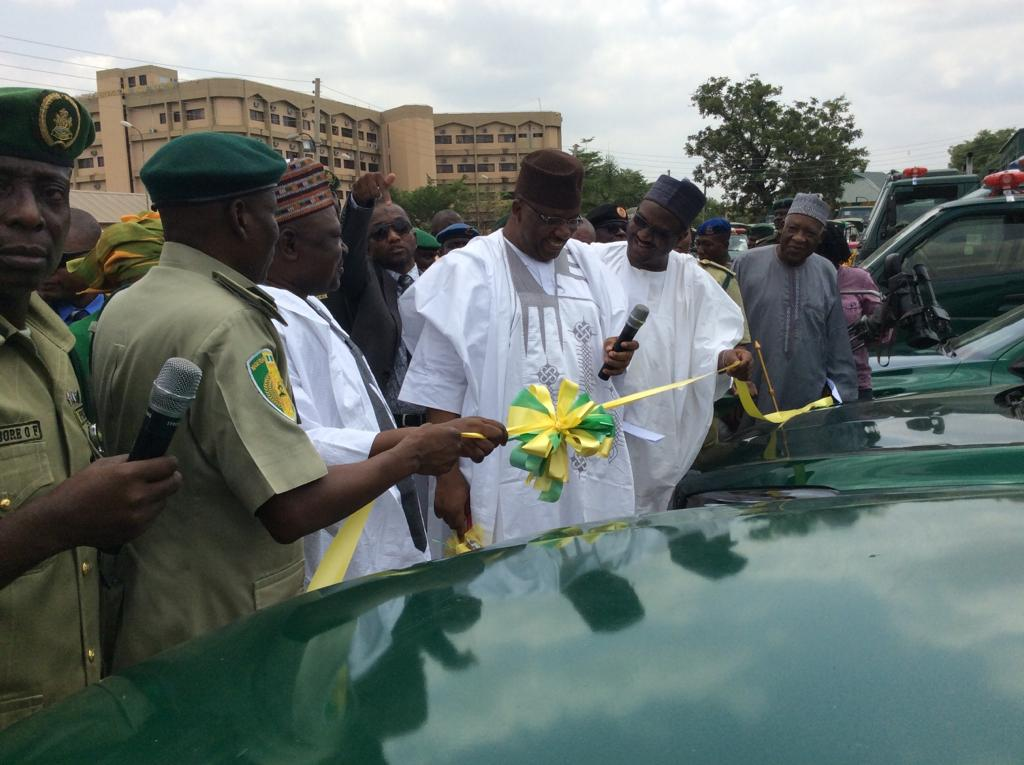
commissioning of the new vehicles for the correctional service

4. He created a SITUATION ROOM for the coordination of the activities of all security and public safety agencies, especially in response to emergencies.

5. He led the US-NIGERIA Security Sector Initiatives for the reforms of the security sector in response to emergencies, defence procurements, and activities in the northeast.

6. He developed the idea of establishing the INSTITUTE OF DOMESTIC SECURITY for the strategic training of senior officers in the security agencies.

7. He proposed the idea of production of passports in Nigeria rather than overseas to make passports cheaper for Nigerians and also protect the database.

8. He started the Ministry of Interior Games in every two years, and conducted twice before he the Ministry. The idea was to create a platform to enhance the cooperation, coordination, and collaboration of the agencies.

9. He revived the Federal Fire Service, from only one old fire truck in its inventory to more than 40 new fire trucks, many water tankers. Also established six Zonal Fire HQs, in addition to reactivating the Fire Training School well equipped.

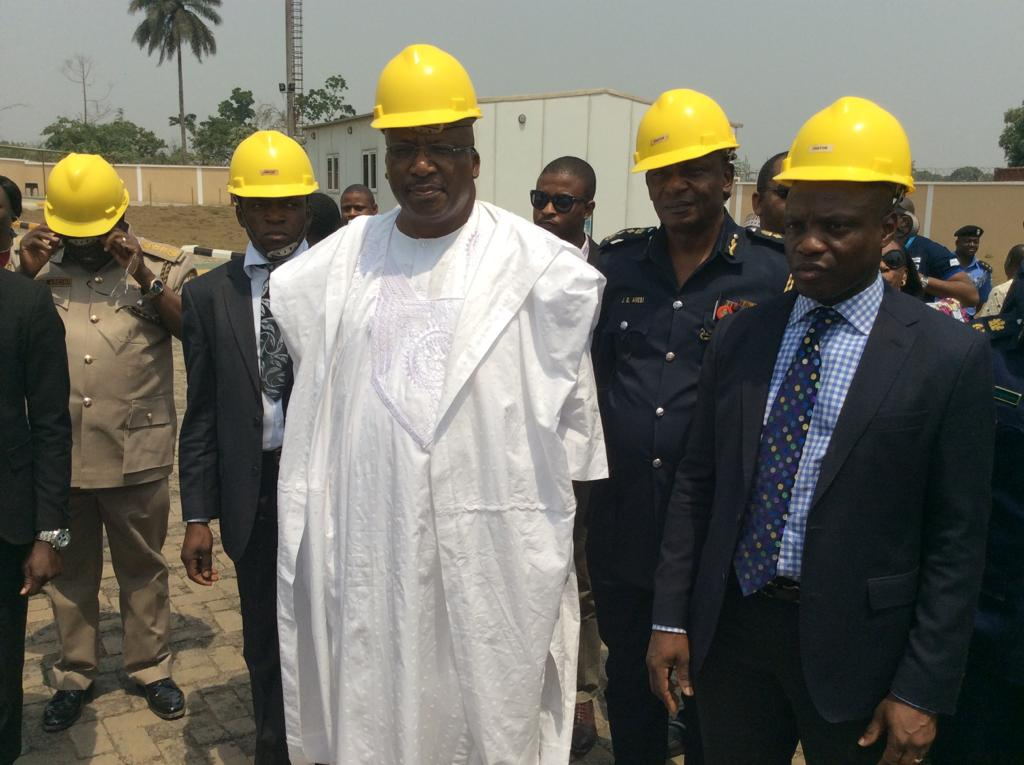
Inspecting the reconstruction of the Federal Fire Service School

10. He created the Agro Rangers in the Civil Defence Corps for the protection of agricultural investments for individuals, groups and institutions against attacks from bandits and other criminals.

11. He initiated a High Level regional conference in partnership with ECOWAS Commission for the implementation of the ECOWAS Protocol On Transhumance to checkmate and monitor the movements of transhumance across borders.

12. He designed strategy in partnership with the EU on irregular migration of Nigerians to Europe taking advantage of the well funded EU program on reverse migration for the training of stranded Nigerians in useful skills, especially the victims of human trafficking.

13. Integrated the main Ministry of Interior with the Agencies as part of the reforms to enable the civil servants be in tune with the operations of the Agencies.

14. He built a befitting office for the Minister, even he did not occupy it before he left, and the same time gave the old structure of building in the Ministry a face lift and refurbished.

15. He initiated the resettlement of Nigerian refugees in Cameroon, who were displaced by Boko Haram insurgency. He did that in partnership with Ministry of Foreign Affairs and the Cameroonian government.

== Fellowship, Membership and Boards ==
- Fellow, National War College
- Distinguished Alumnus of the National Defense College, Nigeria for Professional Excellence
- Founder and Chairman, Board of Trustees, Foundation for Victims of Child Abuse (VCAF)
- Founder and Chairman, Board Trustees, Nigeria Society of Victimology
- Member, World Society of Victimology
- Member, International Society of Criminology
- Fellow, Society for Peace Studies and Practice, University of Ibadan
- Co-chair, Africa Peace Forum, California State University, Sacramento, USA
- Chairman Board of University Advancement Centre, University of Ibadan
- Senior Fellow, Center for Peace, Democracy and Development, University of Massachusetts, Boston, USA
- Director, International Police Executive Symposium (IPES), New York
- Honorary Fellow, Nigerian Institute of Public Relations
- Honorary Citizen of Georgia, USA
- Fellow, Certified Institute of Cost Management of Nigeria
- Post - Doctoral Fellowship, The Institute of Certified Public Accountant of Nigeria
- Chairman, Special Security Committee, Arewa Consultative Forum

== Contribution to Higher Education ==
- Registrar, Academic Branch, Nigerian Defense Academy (1993–199)
- Part - time Lecturer (Pro bono) in Criminology, Faculty, Law Ahmadu Bello University, Zaria (1994–1999)
- Co-founder, Pro-Chancellor and Chairman Governing Council, Capital City University, Kano (2021 to Date)
- Professor of Criminology and Security Studies, Capital City University, Kano

== International and Local Conferences ==
- 15th Annual Police Executive Symposium, with the theme "Police Without Borders, Fading Distinction Between Local and Global," Cincinnati, Ohio, USA, 16 May 2008.
- XV World Congress of International Society of Criminology, Barcelona, Spain, 20–25 July 2008.
- International Symposium of the World Society of Victimology, Mito, Ibraki, Japan, 23–28 August 2009.
- Global Community Policing Conclave, A Special Meeting of International Police Executive Symposium (IPES), Kochi, Kerala, India, 4 November 2010.
- 14th International Symposium, World Society of Victimology," Justice for Victims, Cross - Perspective on Conflict, trauma, and reconciliation," The Hague, The Netherlands, 20–24, May 2012.
- The 19th World Congress of International Society of Criminology, Doha, Qatar, 28–30 October 2019.
- Peace and Peace Training, Peace Operations Institute, Williamsburg, Virginia, USA,13 July 2010.
- United Nations High Commission on Refugees (UNHCR) Conference on Regional Protection Dialogue on Lake Chad Basin, held in Abuja, 28–29, January 2019.
- Kaduna State Seminar on Security Consciousness and Awareness Banquet Hall, General Hassan Usman Katsina House, Kaduna, 26–28 March 1996.
- National Workshop for Crime Prevention and Control, International Conference Center Abuja 20–22 May 1996.
- National Conference on Public Record and Information Management, 17 November 2016.

== Lectures and Paper Presentation ==
- "Nigeria and Peace Support," George C Marshall European Center for Peace and Security Studies, Garmisch, Germany, 23 March 2010.
- "Professional Responsive Soldiering:A panacea of successful military operations," Lecture Delivered at the Combat Support Arms Training Week, Nigeria Army Ordinance Corp Auditorium, Yaba, Lagos, 1 July 2019.
- "States and the Burden of National Development In Nigeria," 3rd Annual Senator Abiola Ajimobi Roundtable, Sponsored by Institute for Peace and Strategic Studies (IPSS), University of Ibadan, 3 June 2016.
- "Higher Education and National Development: Is Nigeria Getting it Right?"Baze University First Matriculation Lecture, Abuja 9 June 2011
- "Threat Profile and Emerging Trends in Managing Nigeria's National Security," Inaugural Lecture of the Institute of Peace and Strategic Studies IPSS, University of Ibadan, 3 June 2016.
- "Rules of Law and Security Sector Reform," Lecture Prepared for the 2022 Annual Conference of the Nigerian Bar Association Section on Public Interest and Development Law (NBA - SPIDEL), 24 May 2022.
- "Internal Security Architecture and National Security Options to Meet Emerging Challenges," Lecture Delivered at the National Defense College, Abuja, 6 June 2018.
- "2023 Elections in Nigeria and Its Security Implications," National Conference Organized by the National Association of Criminology and Security Practitioners of Nigeria, Green - Minds Hotels Ltd, Abuja 14–15 October 2022.
- "Education and the Threats to Nigeria's Internal Security," 2016 Barewa Old Boys Association Annual Lecture, Abuja, 8 October 2016.
- "Internal Threats, Internal Security and the Challenges to Nigeria's Transitional Democracy," Paper Presented at the 5th Annual Conference and General Assembly of the Society for Peace Studies and Practice, held at the University of Ibadan, 27–29 June 2011.
- "The Dilemma of the Fulbe Pastoralist," Lecture Delivered at the National Security Summit on Pastoralism In Nigeria, Organized by Miyyatti Allah Cattle Breeders Association (MACBAN) and the Northern Consensus Movement, on 1 June 2022.
- "Multinational Joint Task Force Chad-Nigeria-Niger-Cameroon: Issues, Challenges, and Strategies for Sustainable Cooperation, Roundtable and Panel Discussion", Fraser Suites, Abuja, 16 July 2019.
- "Coordinating Mechanism for Effective Protection of Critical National Assets and Infrastructure In Nigeria," Graduation Lecture for Participants of the Army War College (AWCN), Course 7/2013, 3 October 2023.
- "2023 Politics, National Security, and Nigeria's Stability," Keystone Lecture of the 2021 Blueprint Annual Public Lectures and Impact Series/Awards, International Conference Center, 16 August 2022.
- "Elections Democratic Consolidation, and Good Governance In Africa," Keynote Address at the International Conference and Annual General Meeting of the Society for Peace Studies and Practice, Nigerian Army Resource center, 30 November 2022.
- "Insecurity and National Development: What Role for Military Veterans?" Conversation with Member of NDA 18th Regular Course, at Command Officers Mess, Abuja, 18 December 2022.
- "Immigration and International Mobilization: Boko Haram and Security," Paper Presented at Lateran University, Rome, Italy, 20–21 October 2016.

== Books ==
- Criminology and Criminal Justice 1999.
- Military Law Terminologies 1991.
- Policing and Terrorism challenges and issues in intelligence 2004.
- Law and Criminality in Nigeria, 1994
- Issues on Crime Prevention and Control In Nigeria (Co-editor), 1997
- The Weatherhead Center Presents: "Nigeria and Her Security Challenges,"
- "Cross-Border Crime and Policing: Challenges and Lessons for Nigeria,"
- "The Challenge of Police Discretion and Crime Statistics In Nigeria,"

== Honors and awards ==
1.Commander of the Order of the Federal Republic (CFR).

2. National productivity Order of merit.

3. Distinguished Service Star.

4.A 2018 Hall of Fame Awardee of the college of education.

5. Health and Human service award by Kent state university Ohio USA.

6. Awarded the colonel pyar Lal memorial gold medal for the best thesis at the National Defence College New Delhi India.

7. Ankrah Hall distinguished award at the Ghana Armed Forces Staff College.

8. Silver and Golden Jubilee Medals.

9. Chief of Army Staff Commendation Award.

10. Fellow War College Dagger.

== Personal life ==
Abdulrahman Bello Dambazau is married to Hadiza B Dambazau, former president, Nigerian Army Officers' Wives Association, and blessed with children. His hobbies include listening to music, watching documentaries, playing golf and conducting scholarly research. He holds the traditional title of Barden Kano.

== Title ==
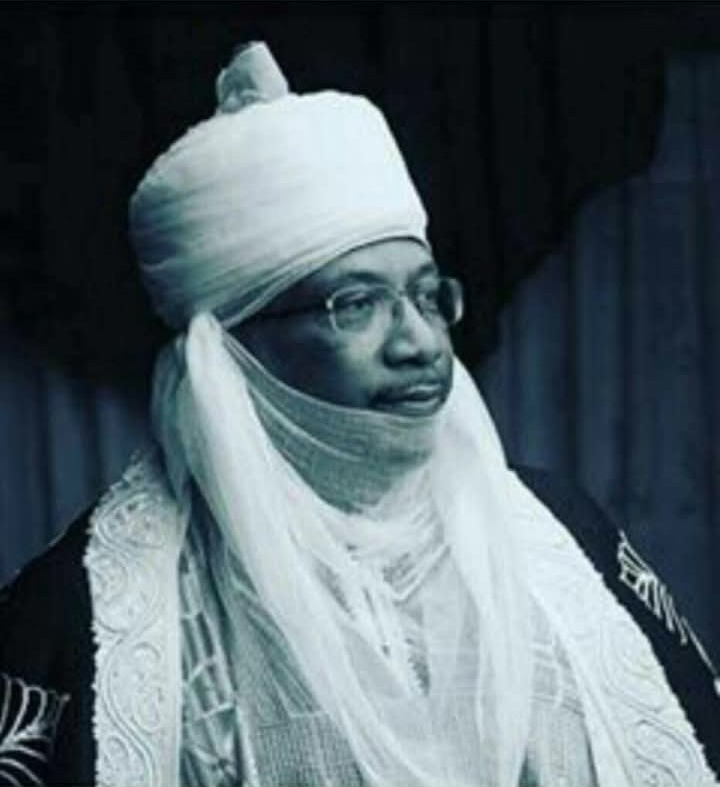
Abdulrahman Dambazau is the first Barden in Kano Emirate

Dambazau holds the traditional title of Barden Kano.

== See also ==
- List of Hausa people
