= Taoreed Lagbaja =

Nigerian army officer (1968–2024)

Lieutenant General Taoreed Lagbaja CFR

Chief of Army Staff
- In office 23 June 2023 – 5 November 2024
- President: Bola Tinubu
- Preceded by: Faruk Yahaya
- Succeeded by: Olufemi Oluyede

Personal details
- Born: 28 February 1968 Irepodun, Western State, Nigeria (now in Osun State)
- Died: 5 November 2024 (aged 56) Lagos, Nigeria
- Education: St Charles Grammar School; Local Authority Teachers College
- Alma mater: Nigerian Defence Academy (BSc); United States Army War College (MS)

Military service
- Allegiance: Nigeria
- Branch/service: Nigerian Army
- Years of service: 1987–2024
- Rank: Lieutenant general

Taoreed Abiodun Lagbaja CFR (28 February 1968 – 5 November 2024) was a Nigerian Army lieutenant general who served as the Chief of Army Staff of Nigeria from June 2023 to November 2024. He was appointed on 19 June 2023 by President Bola Tinubu to succeed Lieutenant General Faruk Yahaya.

== Early life ==
Lagbaja was born in the town of Ilobu in Irepodun, present day Osun State on 28 February 1968. He spent his early life in Osogbo where he attended the St Charles Grammar School and Local Authority Teachers College.

== Career ==
Lagbaja was admitted into the Nigerian Defence Academy in 1987 as a member of the 39th Regular Course. He was commissioned as a second lieutenant on 19 September 1992 into the Nigerian Infantry Corps. Between 1992 and 1995, Lagbaja was platoon commander of the 93 Battalion. From 1995 to 2001, he was platoon commander of 72 Special Forces Battalion. In 2001, Lagbaja obtained a Bachelor’s degree in Geography from the Nigerian Defence Academy. He studied Strategic Studies at the US Army War College at the Master's level.

He was an instructor at the Nigerian Defence Academy from 2001 to 2004. At a time, Lagbaja was a Grade 2 Staff Officer in charge of peacekeeping at the Army Headquarters Department of Army Training and Operations. Then he was a Directing Staff at the Armed Forces Command and Staff College, Jaji from 2006 to 2009.

In 2009, he became Deputy Chief of Staff G1 at Headquarters 81 Division and subsequently, he became Commanding Officer at 72 Special Forces Battalion Makurdi from 2012 to 2013 and 2014 to 2015. In 2016, he was named the Chief of Staff at Headquarters 8 Task Force Division, Monguno. He served as Director of Operations at the Army Headquarters Department of Army Training and Operations from January to December 2018. He was a Commander of Headquarters 9 Brigade, Ikeja, Lagos State and Headquarters 2 Brigade, Uyo, Akwa Ibom State. Before his new appointment, Lagbaja was General Officer Commanding Headquarters 82 Division from March 2021 to August 2022 and Headquarters 1 Division from August 2022 to June 2023.

Earlier in 2008, he attended the Military Observers Course on Peacekeeping Wing at the Nigerian Army School of Infantry Jaji (February – May 2008) and ECOWAS Standby Force Battalion Command Post Course – Peacekeeping Centre, Bamako, Mali – (June – August 2010). He started his career as a second lieutenant and he was a lieutenant general, a rank he was promoted to in July 2023.

Lagbaja participated in Operation HARMONY IV in Bakassi Peninsula; United Nations Mission in the Democratic Republic of Congo (MONUC); Operation ZAKI Internal Security Operation in Benue State; Operation "Lafiya Dole"; Operation MESA/Operation UDO KA – March 2021 – August 2022 – Internal Security Operation in South-east Nigeria (Anambra/Abia/Ebonyi/Enugu and Imo States); and Operation "Forest Sanity" – Aug 2022 to 2023 – Internal Security Operation in Kaduna/Niger States.

== Personal life and death ==
Married to Mariya Abiodun-Lagbaja, he also had three children.

Lagbaja died in Lagos, Nigeria, on 5 November 2024, at the age of 56. This followed speculation after he had not made a public appearance since September. A week before his death, he was replaced in an acting capacity by Lt. Gen. Olufemi Oluyede.
