= Gibson Jalo =

2nd Chief of Defence Staff of Nigeria (1939–2000)

Lieutenant General Gibson Sanda Jalo CFR, FSS
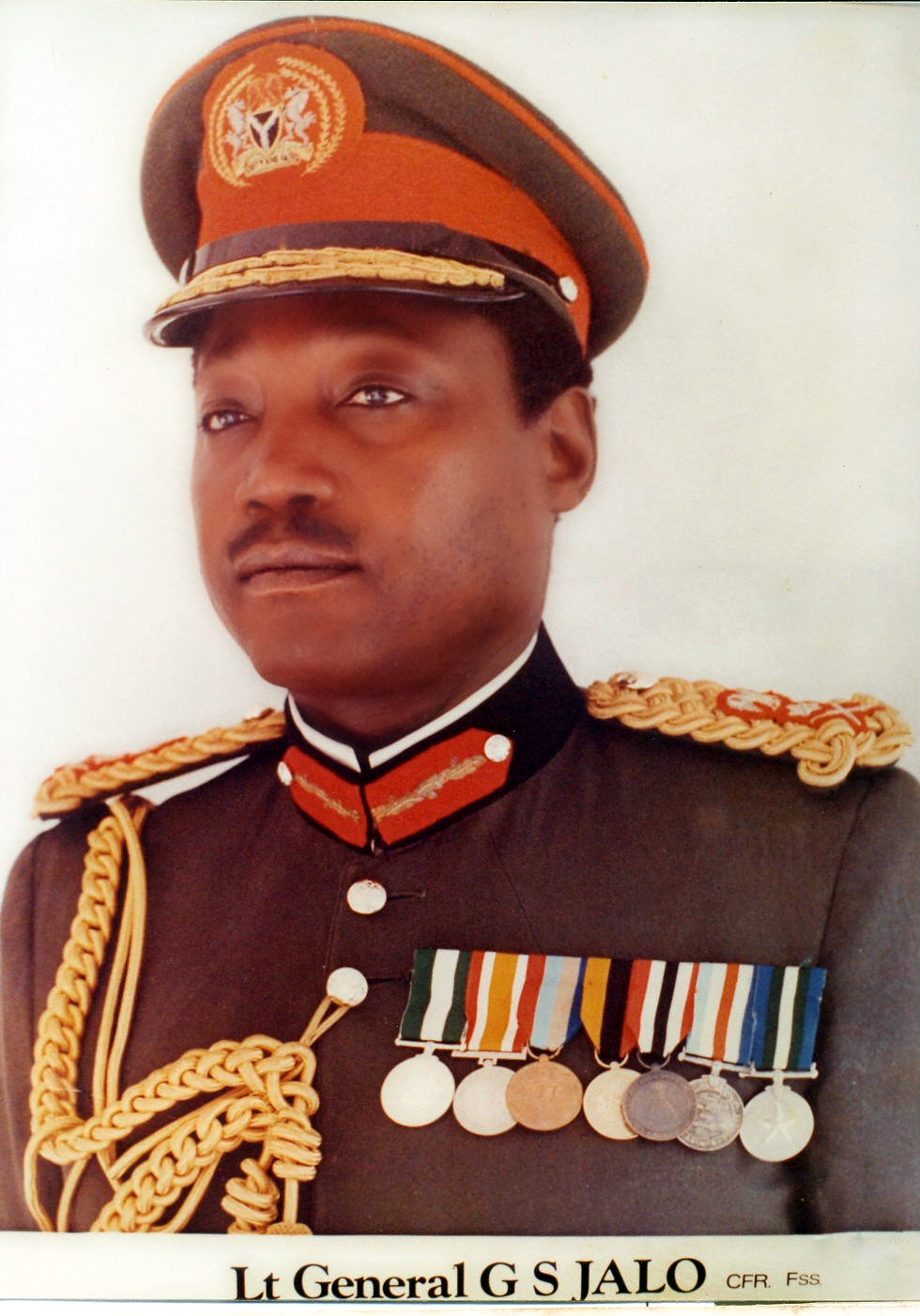
- Lieutenant General Gibson Sanda Jalo as Chief of Defence Staff of Nigeria
- Born: Gibson Sanda Jalo; 1 March 1939; Demsa, Adamawa Province, British Northern Nigeria
- Died: 10 January 2000 (aged 60); London, United Kingdom
- Education: Mons Officer Cadet School; National Defence College (India)
- Military career
- Allegiance: Nigeria
- Branch: Nigerian Army
- Service years: 1959–1984
- Rank: Lieutenant General
- Service number: N/114
- Commands: 2nd Division (Nigerian Civil War); Garrison Commander, Lagos; Nigerian Defence Academy (Deputy Commandant, Commandant); 3rd Infantry Division (later 3rd Armoured Division, now 3 Division), Jos; Deputy Chief of Army Staff; Chief of Army Staff; Chief of Defence Staff
- Conflicts: Nigerian Civil War
- Awards: Commander of the Federal Republic (CFR) Force Service Star (FSS)
- Other work: Chairman, Société Bancaíre Nigeria Limited; Chairman, Mix and Bake Flour Mills Limited; Non-Executive Director of Union Bank of Nigeria Plc; Chairman of Sea Trucks Group, Nigeria; Chairman of Jason Oilfield Ventures Limited
- In office April 1980 – October 1981
- Preceded by: Ipoola Alani Akinrinade
- Succeeded by: Mohammed Inuwa Wushishi
- In office 2 October 1981 – 31 December 1983
- Preceded by: Ipoola Alani Akinrinade
- Succeeded by: Domkat Bali
- In office August 1975 – January 1978
- Preceded by: Brig. Illiya Bisalla
- Succeeded by: Brig. E. S. Armah

Lieutenant General Gibson Sanda Jalo CFR, FSS (1 March 1939 – 10 January 2000) was a Nigerian Army officer who served as Chief of Army Staff from April 1980 to October 1981 and as the second Chief of Defence Staff of Nigeria from October 1981 to December 1983. Commissioned in 1960, he held several key command and staff appointments during a career spanning over two decades, including service in the Nigerian Civil War and leadership of the Nigerian Defence Academy. Following his retirement in 1984, he held various positions in the private sector and was a member of national policy committees, including Nigeria’s Vision 2010 programme. He was born in Demsa, Adamawa Province, British Northern Nigeria, and died in London, United Kingdom, on 10 January 2000.

== Early life and education ==
Jalo was born on 1 March 1939 in Demsa, Adamawa Province, British Northern Nigeria, into the royal family of the Batta people. His father was the late Hama Batta, Chief Zaro (Jalo) Kpanti, Paramount Ruler of Demsa, and his mother was the late Kukulu Laiyatu Jalo.

He attended Numan Elementary School, Adamawa Province (1946–1950), Yola Middle School, Adamawa Province (1951–1952), and later Keffi Government College, Nassarawa Province (1953–1958). He was also an active member of the Keffi Old Boys Association (KOBA). His classmates at Keffi included prominent Nigerians such as the late Wantaregh Paul Iyorpuu Unongo, the late Dr. Nuhu Andeyaba, and others.

== Military career ==
He enlisted in the Infantry Corps of the Royal Nigerian Military Force on 20 September 1959 and was commissioned as a Second Lieutenant on 4 November 1960 after completing training at the Regular Officers’ Training School, Teshie, Ghana. He subsequently attended the Mons Officer Cadet School, Aldershot, United Kingdom, later in 1960.

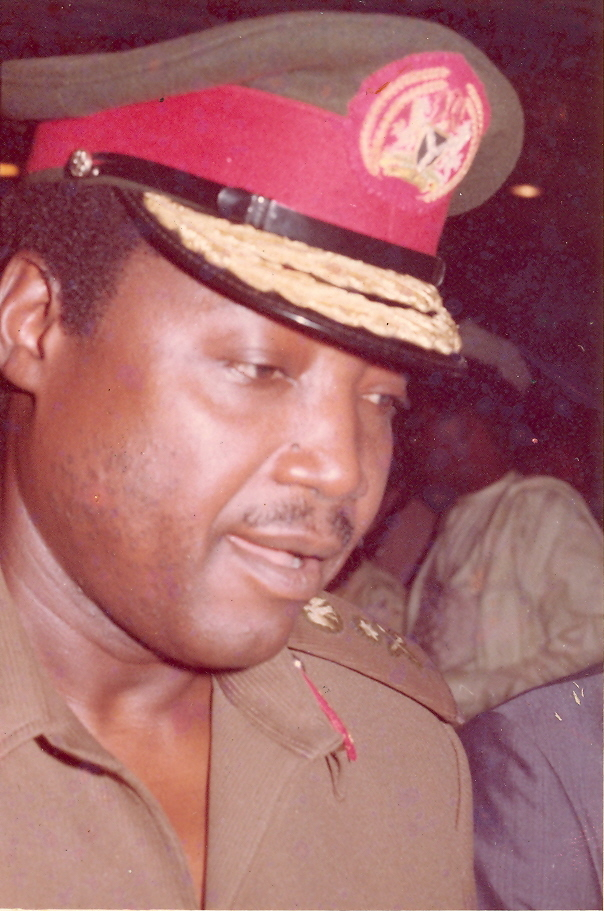
Lieutenant General Gibson Sanda Jalo, Nigerian Army

His early career included postings as Platoon Commander (1960–1962), Battalion Adjutant (1963–1964), Company Commander (1964–1965), and Battalion Commander (1966–1967). During the Nigerian Civil War, Jalo served as Second-in-Command of the 2nd Division (1967–1968) and later as Division Commander, 2nd Division in Benin (1969–1970).

After the war, he held a series of senior commands, including Garrison Commander, Lagos (1971–1972); Deputy Commandant of the Nigerian Defence Academy (NDA), Kaduna (1973–1974); and subsequently Commandant of the NDA (1975–1977). He succeeded Brigadier-General Illiya Bisalla as Commandant and was later succeeded by Brigadier-General E. S. Armah. He was then appointed General Officer Commanding (GOC) 3rd Infantry Division (later 3rd Armoured Division, now 3 Division), Jos (1977–1979), before rising to the position of Deputy Chief of Army Staff (1979–1980).

In 1980, Jalo became Chief of Army Staff, serving until 1981, after which he was appointed the second Chief of Defence Staff of Nigeria (1981–1983), succeeding Lieutenant General Ipoola Alani Akinrinade. He was later succeeded as Chief of Defence Staff by General Domkat Bali.

During his military service, Jalo was also a member of the Supreme Military Council and the National Defence Council. At one point he also served briefly as Acting Military Governor of Lagos State in the 1970s.

Alongside his regimental duties, Jalo served as Aide-de-Camp (ADC) to the British General Officer Commanding, Royal Nigerian Army (1960–1962) and as Adjutant of the 1st Battalion, Nigerian Army (1963–1964). His professional military education included attendance at the Joint Services Staff College (JSSC) at Latimer House, Buckinghamshire, United Kingdom, and the National Defence College, India.

He served in the Nigerian Army until 3 January 1984, when he took voluntary retirement. His Certificate of Military Service was formally issued on 7 March 1984 by then Chief of Army Staff, Major General Ibrahim Babangida.

== Dates of ranks ==
Rank	Date
Lieutenant	7 April 1962
Captain	20 September 1964
Major	10 June 1967
Lieutenant Colonel	11 May 1968
Colonel	1 April 1970
Brigadier General	1 October 1973
Major General	1 January 1976
Lieutenant General	15 April 1980

== Later life and legacy ==
Following his retirement from the Nigerian Army, Jalo held a number of positions in the private sector. He was Chairman of the defunct Société Bancaíre Nigeria Limited, Chairman of Mix and Bake Flour Mills Limited, Non-Executive Director of Union Bank of Nigeria Plc, Chairman of Sea Trucks Group, Nigeria, and Chairman of Jason Oilfield Ventures Limited.

He was appointed a member of the Traditional Rulers and Leaders of Thought Committee, and later served as Chairman of the Sub-Committee on Solid Minerals within Nigeria’s Vision 2010 national development plan.

Jalo was conferred with several national honours, including the title of Commander of the Federal Republic of Nigeria (CFR) and the Force Service Star (FSS).

His hobbies included field hockey and football, and he was affectionately known as "7 Miles" on the football pitch during his playing days.

== See also ==
- Chief of Defence Staff (Nigeria)
- Chief of Army Staff (Nigeria)
- Nigerian Defence Academy
- Nigerian Army
