= Ishaya Bamaiyi =

Nigerian general (born 1949)

Lieutenant General Ishaya Bamaiyi GCON

Chief of Army Staff
- In office March 1996 – May 1999
- Preceded by: Maj-Gen. Alwali Kazir
- Succeeded by: Lt-Gen. S.V.L. Malu

Personal details
- Born: 21 September 1949 (age 76) Zuru, Northern Region, British Nigeria (now in Kebbi State, Nigeria)
- Awards: Grand Commander of the Order of the Niger; Forces Service Star; Meritorious Service Star; Distinguished Service Star; National Service Medal; General Service Medal; Defence Service Medal

Military service
- Allegiance: Nigeria
- Branch/service: Nigerian Army
- Years of service: 1968–1999
- Rank: Lieutenant general
- Commands: Brigades of Guards, Lagos Garrison Command
- Battles/wars: Nigerian Civil War

Ishaya Rizi Bamaiyi , GCON (born 21 September 1949) is a retired Nigerian Army lieutenant general who served as Chief of Army Staff from 1996 to 1999 during the military regime of Generals Sani Abacha and Abdulsalami Abubakar. His older brother was Major General Musa Bamaiyi, former Head of the National Drug Law Enforcement Agency (NDLEA).

== Background and education ==
He was born in Kebbi State, Northwestern Nigeria. He was Short serviced commissioned into the Nigerian Army infantry Corps in 1968 as a member of SSC 4 he attended the following courses:

- Nigerian Defence Academy, Kaduna, 1968
- Young Officers infantry Course 1971
- Advanced Infantry Company Commanders Course, UK, 1976
- Command and General Staff College, United States 1981-82
- International Management Course, USA, 1986
- Snr. Executive Course, National Institute for Policy and Strategic Studies, Kuru, Jos. 1992

== Military career ==
General Bamaiyi prior to becoming the Chief of Army Staff held the following posts:

- Adjutant. 182 Infantry Battalion. 1968-70
- Commanding Officer 70 Infantry Battalion, 1972–77
- Directing Staff, Command and Staff College, Jaji, 1982–84
- Commander. 9 Mechanised Brigade, 1986–90
- Commander, Brigade of Guards, 1990–92
- Director Training, Army Headquarters, Department of Operations, 1992–93
- Commander. Lagos Garrison Command. 1993-96

General Bamaiyi was appointed Chief of Army Staff (COAS) in March 1996 by General Sanni Abacha. He served as COAS for 3 years until his retirement in May 1999.

== Controversy ==
=== Attempted murder allegations ===
On 10 December 1999 Gen. Bamaiya was charged with the attempted Murder of Guardian Newspaper Publisher Alex Ibru on 2 February 1996 alongside the former Chief Security Officer (CSO) to Gen Abacha, Major Hamza al-Mustapha, and others by the Lagos state government. Bamaiyi who served under the military administration of late General Sani Abacha was arraigned by the Lagos state government of the attempted murder of publisher of the Guardian newspaper, Mr. Alex Ibru, and an eminent Delta state indigene, Mr. Isaac Porbeni. He was discharged and acquitted on 2 April 2008 of any wrongdoing in the saga after nine years in detention.

=== Feud with Musa Bamaiyi ===
Ishaya and his older brother, Musa Bamaiyi reportedly feuded for years leading to Musa seeking redress from the Human Rights Violation Investigation Commission (HRVIC) Panel, headed by Justice Chukwudifu Oputa.
