= Lieutenant general (Nigeria) =

Senior rank in the Nigerian Army

- Flag of a lieutenant general

- Rank insignia of a lieutenant general

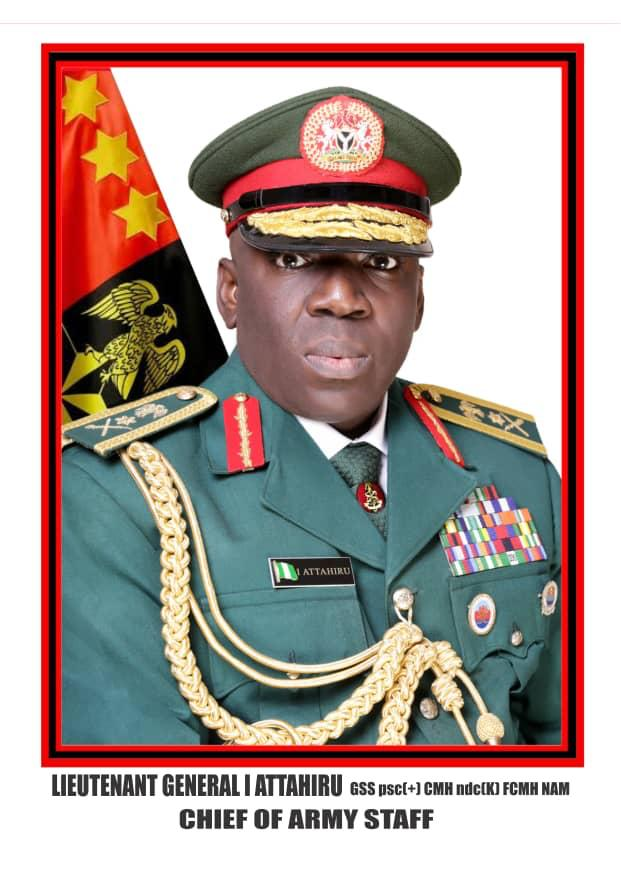
- Chief of Army Staff Lieutenant General Ibrahim Attahiru official portrait showing his lieutenant general insignia
- Country: Nigeria
- Service branch: Nigerian Army
- Abbreviation: Lt-Gen
- Rank: Three-star rank
- NATO rank code: OF-8
- Non-NATO rank: O-8
- Next higher rank: General
- Next lower rank: Major-general
- Equivalent ranks: Vice-admiral (Nigerian Navy); Air marshal (Nigerian Air Force)

Lieutenant general (Lt Gen), is the second-highest rank of the Nigerian Army and generally it is the highest active rank as the Nigerian army do not have any appointment in the rank of full general but in the case of the appointment of Chief of Defence Staff, the rank of full general is given (if the chief is appointed from the army and not from the navy or the air force). It is the equivalent of a multinational three-star rank.

The rank of lieutenant general is usually held by the Chief of Army Staff.

Lieutenant general is a superior rank to major general, but subordinate to a (full) general. The rank has a NATO rank code of OF-8, equivalent to a vice-admiral in the Nigerian Navy and an air marshal in the Nigerian Air Force (NAF) and the air forces of many Commonwealth countries.

The rank insignia is an eagle and a six-pointed star over a crossed sabre and baton.

== Usage ==
Ordinarily, the lieutenant general rank is usually held by only the Chief of Army Staff which implies there is usually only one serving lieutenant general in the Army at a time but there have been some occasions where there were more than one lieutenant-general in the Army like the case of Lt-Gen Jeremiah Useni, who was the Federal Capital Territory (FCT) Minister under General Sani Abacha, while, Lt-Gen Ishaya Bamaiyi was the Chief of Army Staff. Also, there was the case of Lt-Gen Abel Akale, who was the Commandant of the Nigerian Defence Academy (NDA), Kaduna, at the time Lt-Gen Martin Luther Agwai was the Chief of Army Staff. Maj-Gen Chikadibia Isaac Obiakor was also promoted to Lt-Gen and made Commander of United Nations (UN) Peace Keeping Operations while Lt-Gen Agwai was still Army Chief in December 2005. The most recent case was that of the promotion of Maj-Gen Lamidi Adeosun to the rank of lieutenant general in July 2019 while Lt-Gen Tukur Buratai was still Army Chief.

During the military rule, the Chief of Staff, Supreme Headquarters and the Chief of General Staff (titles accorded to the deputy head of state and de facto vice president under different regimes) usually held a three-star rank like in the cases of Lt-Gens Olusegun Obasanjo and Oladipo Diya, both of whom never served as the Chief of Army Staff.

== List of Nigerian Army Lieutenant generals ==
Since 1960, 37 officers have attained this rank. Among them, one officer, (Olusegun Obasanjo) attained this rank while he was Chief of Staff, Supreme Headquarters (de facto vice president), another officer, (Oladipo Diya) attained this rank before becoming Chief of General Staff (de facto vice president), 21 served as the Chief of Army Staff, 5 of them (Ipoola Alani Akinrinade, Gibson Sanda Jalo, Domkat Yah Bali, Sani Abacha and Oladipo Diya) served as Chief of Defence Staff while holding this rank, Bali and Abacha were later promoted to the rank of full General. 7 of them (Ipoola Alani Akinrinade, Gibson Sanda Jalo, Sani Abacha, Alexander Ogomudia, Martin Luther Agwai, Owoye Andrew Azazi and Olufemi Oluyede) served in both positions.

No	Name	Promoted	Retired	Born	Died
1	Olusegun Obasanjo	1976	1979	1937	
2	Theophilus Yakubu Danjuma	1976	1979	1938	
3	Ipoola Alani Akinrinade	1979	1981	1939	
4	Gibson Jalo	1980	1984	1939	2000
5	Mohammed Inuwa Wushishi	1981	1984	1940	2021
6	Domkat Yah Bali	1987	1990	1940	2020
7	Sani Abacha	1987	Nil	1943	1998
8	Garba Duba	1992	1993	1942	2024
9	Salihu Ibrahim	1992	1993	1935	2018
10	Gado Nasko	1992	1993	1941	
11	Jeremiah Timbut Useni	1992	1999	1943	2025
12	Mohammed Balarabe Haladu	1992	Nil	1944	1998
13	Oladipo Diya	1992	1998	1944	2023
14	Joshua Dogonyaro	1992	1993	1940	2021
15	Aliyu Mohammed Gusau	1992	1993	1943	
16	Rufus Modupe Kupolati	1995	1999	1946	2005
17	Ishaya Bamaiyi	1996	1999	1949	
18	Victor Malu	1999	2001	1947	2017
19	Alexander Ogomudia	2001	2006	1949	
20	Martin Luther Agwai	2003	2009	1948	
21	Abel Akale	2004	2004	–	–
22	Joseph Owonibi	2005	2005	1949	
23	Chikadibia Isaac Obiakor	2005	2011	1951	
24	Owoye Andrew Azazi	2006	2008	1952	2012
25	Luka Yusuf	2007	2008	1952	2009
26	Abdulrahman Bello Dambazau	2008	2010	1954	
27	Azubuike Ihejirika	2010	2014	1956	
28	Kenneth Minimah	2014	2015	1959	
29	Tukur Yusuf Buratai	2015	2021	1960	
30	Lamidi Adeosun	2019	2021	1963	
31	Ibrahim Attahiru	2021	Nil	1966	2021
32	Faruk Yahaya	2021	2023	1966	
33	Taoreed Lagbaja	2023	Nil	1968	2024
34	Olufemi Oluyede	2024	In service	1968	
35	Waidi Shaibu	2025	In service	1971	
36	Emmanuel Undiandeye	2025	In service	1968	
37	Abdulsalam Bagudu Ibrahim	2025	2025	1968	

== See also ==
- General (Nigeria)
- Military ranks of Nigeria
- List of Nigerian Army full generals
