= Waidi Shaibu =

Nigerian Army officer (born 1971)

Lieutenant General Waidi Shaibu

Chief of Army Staff
- Incumbent
- Assumed office 30 October 2025
- President: Bola Ahmed Tinubu
- Preceded by: Olufemi Oluyede

Personal details
- Born: 18 December 1971 (age 54) Olamaboro Local Government Area, Kogi State, Nigeria
- Education: Nigerian Defence Academy
- Alma mater: University of Calabar; University of Ibadan; National Defense University

Military service
- Allegiance: Nigeria
- Branch/service: Nigerian Army
- Years of service: 1989–present
- Rank: Lieutenant general

Waidi Shaibu (born 18 December 1971) is a Nigerian Army officer who serves as the Chief of Army Staff. He was appointed to the position by President Bola Ahmed Tinubu in 2025. Shaibu is an officer of the Nigerian Army and has previously served in senior operational and command roles, including Theatre Commander of Operation Hadin Kai.

== Early life and education ==
Waidi Shaibu was born on 18 December 1971 in Olamaboro Local Government Area of Kogi State, Nigeria. He was admitted into the Nigerian Defence Academy as a member of the 41st Regular Course in 1989 and was commissioned into the Nigerian Army in 1994.

He obtained a Bachelor's degree in Mechanical Engineering from the Nigerian Defence Academy. Shaibu later earned postgraduate qualifications in public administration and strategic studies from institutions including the Ghana Institute of Management and Public Administration, the University of Calabar, and the University of Ibadan. He also obtained a Master's degree in Security and Strategic Studies from the National Defense University, Washington, D.C.

== Military career ==
Shaibu is an officer of the Nigerian Army Armour Corps and has served in a variety of command, staff, and instructional appointments during his military career. His early service included platoon and company-level command roles, as well as staff appointments at Army Headquarters and Defence Headquarters.

He has participated in several internal security and counter-insurgency operations, including Operation Lafiya Dole and Operation Hadin Kai in North-East Nigeria. Internationally, he served on peacekeeping and military assistance missions, including the United Nations Mission in Liberia and the African Mission in Sudan.

Shaibu later held senior command and leadership positions within the Nigerian Army. He served as General Officer Commanding, 7 Division, and Commander, Sector 1, Operation Hadin Kai, where he was involved in counter-insurgency operations against insurgent groups in the North-East. He subsequently served as Theatre Commander of the Joint Task Force (North East), Operation Hadin Kai.

In April 2025, he was appointed Director of Armour Research at the Nigerian Army Heritage and Future Centre. He was later appointed Chief of Army Staff of Nigeria on 30 October 2025.
