= Inua Wushishi =

Nigerian general (1940–2021)

Lieutenant general Inuwa Wushishi GCON CFR

Chief of Army Staff
- In office October 1981 – October 1983
- Preceded by: Gibson Jalo
- Succeeded by: Ibrahim Babangida

Personal details
- Born: Mohammed Inuwa Wushishi; 1 January 1940 Wushishi, Northern Region, British Nigeria (now in Niger State, Nigeria)
- Died: 4 December 2021 (aged 81) London, England

Military service
- Allegiance: Nigeria
- Branch/service: Nigerian Army
- Years of service: 1961–1984
- Rank: Lieutenant general

Mohammed Inuwa Wushishi GCON CFR (1 January 1940 – 4 December 2021) was a Nigerian army lieutenant general who served as Chief of Army Staff (COAS), Nigeria from October 1981 to October 1983 during the Nigerian Second Republic.

Inuwa Wushishi was born in Wushishi, North Nigeria, and was a Hausa-Fulani Muslim from Niger State.

== Education ==
Inua Wushishi's education began at Wushishi Junior Primary School, which he attended from 1947-1950. He then attended Paiko Junior Primary School from 1951-1952, followed by Minna Senior Primary School from 1953-1954. His received his final civilian education at Bida Provincial Secondary School (now Government College, Bida), which he attended from 1955-1960.

== Army career ==
Wushishi joined the army on 21 April 1961, and attended the Nigerian Military Training College, Kaduna, and then the Mons Officer Cadet School, Aldershot in the United Kingdom. He was commissioned as a second lieutenant on 12 January 1962.

Later, Wushishi attended the Staff College, Camberley, United Kingdom, 1972 and United States Army War College in Carlisle, Pennsylvania from 1978-1979.

Wushishi served as a member of the United Nations Peace Keeping force in Congo in the early 1960s.

He was appointed Deputy Commandant, Army School of Infantry in July 1975.

He served as Federal Commissioner for Industries (January 1975 – March 1976) and was a member of the Supreme Military Council from 1976 to 1978.

He was Chief of Army Staff (COAS) from October 1981 to October 1983 during the Shehu Shagari administration.

== Later career ==
Wushishi was required to retire on 3 January 1984, after the 31 December 1983 coup in which General Muhammadu Buhari came to power.

After retirement, he entered business. He became chairman of the board of directors of UAC of Nigeria, retiring on 1 January 2010 at age 70.

He received the national honour of Grand Commander of the Order of the Niger.

Wushishi died on 4 December 2021 in London, at the age of 81.
