= Chief of Army Staff (Nigeria) =

Professional head of the Nigerian Army

- Seal of the chief of army staff

- Flag of the chief of army staff
- Incumbent; Lieutenant General Waidi Shaibu since 30 October 2025
- Nigerian Army
- Abbreviation: COAS
- Member of: National Security Council; National Defence Council
- Reports to: Chief of Defence Staff
- Seat: Nigerian Army Headquarters, Abuja
- Appointer: President of Nigeria
- Inaugural holder: Kenneth G. Exham; Johnson Aguiyi-Ironsi (indigenous)
- Formation: 1956 (70 years ago)

The chief of army staff (COAS) has been the title of the professional head of the Nigerian Army since 1966. Prior to 1966, the title was General Officer Commanding, Nigerian Army (GOCNA). Since 1980, the post has been immediately subordinate to the chief of defence staff, the post held by the head of the Nigerian Armed Forces. The position is often occupied by the most senior officer appointed by the president.

The current chief of army staff is Lieutenant General Waidi Shaibu, who succeeded Lieutenant General Olufemi Oluyede, following his appointment as CDS.

== Role ==
In the chain of command, the chief of army staff reports to the chief of defence staff, who in turn reports to the defence minister, accountable to the president of Nigeria. The statutory duty of the officer is to formulate and execute policies towards the highest attainment of national security and operational competence of the Nigerian Army.

== Chiefs of the Nigerian Army ==
Following is a chronological list of officers holding the position of General Officer Commanding (GOC) or Chief of Army Staff (COAS).

=== General Officer Commanding ===
No.	Portrait	General Officer Commanding	Took office	Left office	Time in office
1	Kenneth G. Exham	Major general Kenneth G. Exham	1956	1959	2–3 years
2	Norman Foster	Major general Norman Foster	1959	1963	3–4 years
3	John Alexander Mackenzie	Major general John Alexander Mackenzie	1963	1963	0 years
4	Sir Christopher Welby-Everard	Major general Sir Christopher Welby-Everard (1909–1996)	1963	February 1965	1–2 years
5	Johnson Aguiyi-Ironsi	Major general Johnson Aguiyi-Ironsi (1924–1966); Later military ruler	February 1965	15 January 1966	0–1 years

=== Chief of Army Staff ===
No.	Portrait	Chief of Army Staff	Took office	Left office	Time in office	Ref.
1	Yakubu Gowon FSS	Lieutenant colonel Yakubu Gowon FSS (born 1934); Later military ruler	January 1966	July 1966	6 months	
2	Joseph Akahan OFR FSS	Lieutenant colonel Joseph Akahan OFR FSS (1937–1968)	July 1966	May 1968 †	1 year, 9 months	
3	Hassan Katsina RCDS, PSC	Major general Hassan Katsina RCDS, PSC (1933–1995)	May 1968	January 1971	2 years, 8 months	
4	David Ejoor	Major general David Ejoor (1932–2019)	January 1971	July 1975	4 years, 6 months	
5	Theophilus Danjuma	Lieutenant general Theophilus Danjuma (born 1938)	July 1975	October 1979	4 years, 3 months	
6	Ipoola Alani Akinrinade CFR FSS	Lieutenant general Ipoola Alani Akinrinade CFR FSS (born 1939) later Chief of Defence Staff	October 1979	April 1980	6 months	
7	Gibson Jalo CFR FSS, JSS	Lieutenant general Gibson Jalo CFR FSS, JSS (1939–2000) later Chief of Defence Staff	April 1980	October 1981	1 year, 6 months	
8	Inua Wushishi CFR FSS	Lieutenant general Inua Wushishi CFR FSS (1940–2021)	October 1981	October 1983	2 years	
9	Ibrahim Babangida	Major general Ibrahim Babangida (born 1941); Later military ruler	January 1984	August 1985	1 year, 7 months	
10	Sani Abacha GCON , DSS, mni	Lieutenant general Sani Abacha GCON , DSS, mni (1943–1998); Later military ruler	August 1985	August 1990	5 years	
11	Salihu Ibrahim FSS , FHWC	Lieutenant general Salihu Ibrahim FSS , FHWC (1935–2018)	August 1990	September 1993	3 years, 1 month	
12	Aliyu Mohammed Gusau DSS, rcds	Lieutenant general Aliyu Mohammed Gusau DSS, rcds (born 1943)	September 1993	November 1993	2 months	
13	Chris Alli CRG, DSS, ndc, psc(+)	Major general Chris Alli CRG, DSS, ndc, psc(+) (1944–2023)	November 1993	August 1994	9 months	
14	Alwali Kazir DSS, Usawc, psc(+)	Major general Alwali Kazir DSS, Usawc, psc(+) (born 1947)	August 1994	March 1996	1 year, 7 months	
15	Ishaya Bamaiyi DSS, Usawc, psc(+)	Lieutenant general Ishaya Bamaiyi DSS, Usawc, psc(+) (born 1949)	March 1996	May 1999	3 years, 2 months	
16	Victor Malu DSS, mni, fwc, psc	Lieutenant general Victor Malu DSS, mni, fwc, psc (1947–2017)	May 1999	April 2001	1 year, 11 months	
17	Alexander Ogomudia	Lieutenant general Alexander Ogomudia (born 1949); Later Chief of Defence Staff	April 2001	June 2003	2 years, 2 months	
18	Martin Luther Agwai	Lieutenant general Martin Luther Agwai (born 1948); Later Chief of Defence Staff	June 2003	June 2006	3 years	
19	Owoye Andrew Azazi	Lieutenant general Owoye Andrew Azazi (1952–2012); Later Chief of Defence Staff	1 June 2006	May 2007	11 months	
20	Luka Yusuf CFR, GSS, GPP, DSO, psc(+), fwc, Msc	Lieutenant general Luka Yusuf CFR, GSS, GPP, DSO, psc(+), fwc, Msc (1952–2009)	June 2007	August 2008	1 year, 3 months	
21	Abdulrahman Dambazau CFR, GSS, psc, ndc, fwc(+)	Lieutenant general Abdulrahman Dambazau CFR, GSS, psc, ndc, fwc(+) (born 1954)	August 2008	September 2010	2 years, 1 month	
22	Azubuike Ihejirika CFR, GSS, psc(+), fwc, fniqs	Lieutenant general Azubuike Ihejirika CFR, GSS, psc(+), fwc, fniqs (born 1956)	September 2010	January 2014	3 years, 4 months	
23	Kenneth Minimah GSS, psc(+), fwc	Lieutenant general Kenneth Minimah GSS, psc(+), fwc (born 1959)	January 2014	July 2015	1 year, 6 months	
24	Tukur Yusuf Buratai NAM, GSS, psc(+), ndc (BD)	Lieutenant general Tukur Yusuf Buratai NAM, GSS, psc(+), ndc (BD) (born 1960)	16 July 2015	28 January 2021	5 years, 6 months	
25	Ibrahim Attahiru	Lieutenant general Ibrahim Attahiru (1966–2021)	28 January 2021	21 May 2021 †	3 months	
26	Faruk Yahaya	Lieutenant general Faruk Yahaya (born 1966)	27 May 2021	23 June 2023	2 years	
27	Taoreed Lagbaja	Lieutenant general Taoreed Lagbaja (1968–2024)	23 June 2023	5 November 2024 †	1 year, 4 months	
28	Olufemi Oluyede	Lieutenant general Olufemi Oluyede (born 1968)	30 October 2024	30 October 2025	1 year	
29	Waidi Shaibu	Lieutenant general Waidi Shaibu (born 1971)	30 October 2025	Incumbent	1 year	-

== See also ==
- Nigerian Army Day
