= Umuekwule =

Human settlement in Nigeria

Coordinates: 5.597834°N 7.464173°E

Umuekwule Afugiri is one of the eleven villages that make up Afugiri in Ohuhu, Umuahia North LGA of Abia State, Nigeria, West Africa.
