= Jaji, Nigeria =

Jaji
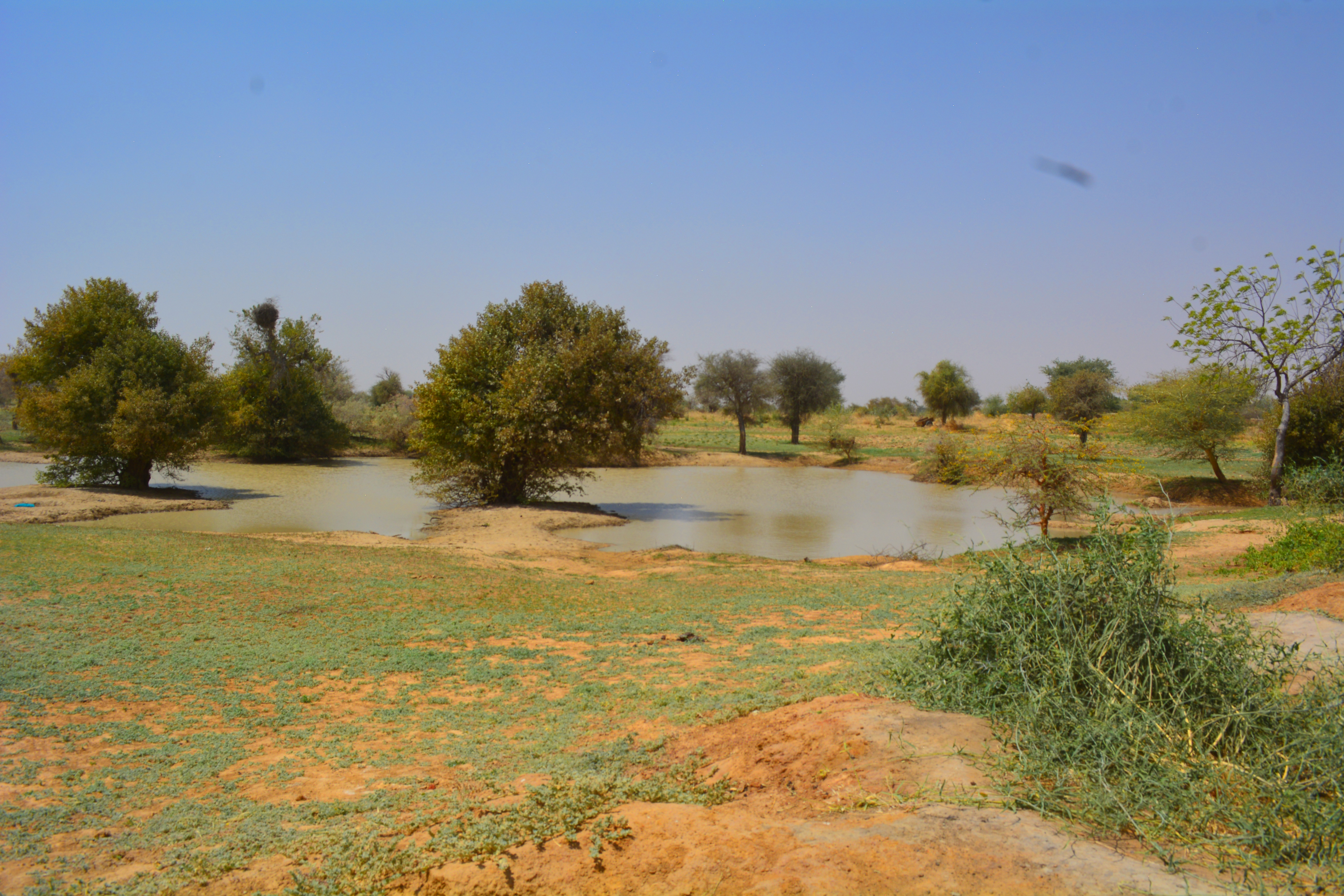
- Jaji Maji, Kaduna, Nigeria

- Location in Nigeria
- Coordinates: 10°49′25″N 7°34′10″E
- Country: Nigeria
- State: Kaduna State
- LGA: Igabi
- Time zone: UTC+1 (CET)

Jaji is a community in Nigeria near Kaduna in Igabi Local Government Area (LGA) of Kaduna State.

== Military staff college ==
Jaji is the site of the Armed Forces Command and Staff College, Jaji. The college opened in May 1976 with two senior officers' courses based on a curriculum derived from that of British Army Staff College, Camberley. A Demonstration Battalion, the Army School of Artillery, and armor support from a composite armored battalion in Kaduna were also located at Jaji. In 1978, with the opening of the air faculty, Jaji was redesignated the Command and Staff College. The navy faculty was established in September 1981, assembling all senior military divisions in one campus.

== Coordinate location ==
jaji is located in igabi local government area of Kaduna state, at the coordinates location of jaji is 10.8237°N, 7.5689°E.

== Places near Jaji ==
- Kargo
- Sanfo
- Birnin yero
- Wusono
- Gargi
- Sabon Birnin Yero
- Labar

== Avian flu outbreak ==
In February 2006, authorities were investigating reports from Jari that could indicate the deadly H5N1 avian flu strain had spread to humans. The problem was reported with ostriches suspected of having avian flu virus on the Sambawa Farm in Jaji. Later it spread to other parts of the country.
