= Doka, Nigeria =

Doka Dokwa, Gidan Sar Doka, Gidan Sarkin Doka
- Village
- Location within Nigeria
- Coordinates: 09°55′4″N 07°22′51″E
- Country: Nigeria
- State: Kaduna State
- LGA: Kachia
- District: Dokwa
- Time zone: UTC+01:00 (WAT)
- Postal code: 802118
- Climate: Aw

Doka, is a village community in Kachia Local Government Area, southern Kaduna state in the Middle Belt region of Nigeria. The postal code for the village is 802118.

== Population ==
As of 2015 the population of Doka is estimated at 616.

== Economy ==
The people of Doka produce crops like millet, maize, guinea corn, and beans, and are also hunters and fishermen.
