= Armed Forces Command and Staff College, Jaji =

Senior military officer college

Coordinates: 10°49′25″N 7°34′10″E

Armed Forces Command and Staff College
- Type: Staff college
- Established: 1976
- Parent institution: Defence Headquarters, Abuja
- Affiliations: Nigerian Armed Forces
- Academic affiliations: IAMP
- Commandant: Air vice-marshal Alfred Olugbenga
- Location: Igabi, Jaji, Kaduna State, Nigeria
- Campus: Rural
- Website: www.afcsc.mil.ng

The Armed Forces Command and Staff College, Jaji is a training facility for the Nigerian Armed Forces, including the army, air force and navy. It is near the village of Jaji, Nigeria, about 35 km (22 mi) northeast of Kaduna in the Igabi Local Government Area (LGA) of Kaduna State, Nigeria. It is currently headed by Air Vice Marshal Alfred Olugbenga.

== History ==
The Armed Forces Command and Staff College opened at Jaji in May 1976, giving two senior officers' courses. In April 1978, the college was expanded when the Army Junior Division was established to conduct courses for Captains in the Nigerian Army. A Demonstration Battalion, the Army School of Artillery, and armor support from a composite armored battalion in Kaduna were also located at Jaji. In September 1978, with the opening of the air faculty, Jaji was redesignated the Command and Staff College. The Navy Faculty was established in September 1981, assembling all senior military divisions in one campus. By 1986, 1,172 officers had graduated from Jaji's senior divisions, and 1,320 from the junior divisions.

The original senior officers' courses were based on a curriculum derived from that of the British Army Staff College, Camberley, and the college establishment was assisted by an advisory team from the British Army. The successor to the advisory team, the Joint Warfare Advisory Team, remained until October 1988.

In September 2005, United Kingdom Armed Forces Minister Adam Ingram visited Jaji and announced that an extra 200,000 UK pounds would be allocated to assist training of over 17,000 Nigerian troops as peacekeepers in Africa. In November 2006, the Prince of Wales of the United Kingdom visited Nigeria and inspected soldiers at Jaji.

Over the years, the college has taken in participants from the Paramilitary services and other agencies. Examples include the Nigeria Police Force (NPF), Federal Road Safety Corps (FRSC), State Security Services (SSS) etc.

== Courses and facilities ==
In order to achieve its mission, the college runs three courses, namely:

- Senior Course for Majors and their equivalent,
- Junior Course for Captains and their equivalent, and
- Staff Duties Course for Senior NCOs (Non Commissioned Officers) of the 3 Services. The Senior Divisions of the Land, Maritime and Air Warfare Departments conduct a one - year joint course per academic year for the officers of the rank of major or its equivalent.

The Junior Courses of the three departments conduct two 20-week courses for officers of the rank of captain in the Army or its equivalent in each academic year.

Successful students of the Senior Course are awarded Pass Staff Course (psc), while successful students for the Junior Course are awarded Pass Junior Staff Course (pjsc) at the end of the Senior and Junior Courses respectively.

The awards are postnominals which they are permitted to use upon graduation.

== Notable staff ==
- Abdulmumini Aminu, governor of Borno State
- Azubuike Ihejirika, former Chief of Army Staff
- Dan Archibong, former military governor of Cross River State
- Dele Joseph Ezeoba, former Chief of Naval Staff
- Emmanuel Acholonu, later administrator of Katsina State
- Gideon Orkar, leader of the April 1990 coup
- John Mark Inienger, commander of ECOMOG in Liberia
- John Nanzip Shagaya, later a Senator
- Joshua Anaja, former military governor of Plateau State
- Martin Luther Agwai, Chief of Army Staff
- Tukur Yusuf Buratai, Chief of Army Staff
- Sani Bello, governor of Kano State
- Suraj Abdurrahman, Command Officer in Charge of the Armed Forces of Liberia
- Alwali Kazir, Chief of Army Staff
- Oladipo Philip Ayeni, former Pioneer military governor of Bayelsa State

== Notable alumni ==
- Azubuike Ihejirika, former Chief of Army Staff
- Ibrahim Babangida, military ruler of Nigeria
- Owoye Andrew Azazi, Chief of Army Staff and Chief of Defence Staff
- Emmanuel Ukaegbu, later military Administrator of Anambra State
- Jonah Wuyep, chief of the Air Staff
- Femi John Femi, chief of Air Staff
- Olagunsoye Oyinlola, governor of Osun State
- Paul Obi, administrator of Bayelsa State
- Abubakar Tanko Ayuba, governor of Kaduna State and Senator
- Dominic Oneya, administrator of Kano State and Benue State
- Amadi Ikwechegh, governor of Imo State
- Tunji Olurin, governor of Oyo State, administrator of Ekiti State
- Lawan Gwadabe, governor of Niger State
- Oladipo Philip Ayeni, First Military Administrator of Bayelsa State
- Issah Adam Yakubu, Chief of Naval Staff (Ghana)
