= Orders, decorations, and medals of Nigeria =

Nigerian National Honours are a set of orders and decorations conferred upon Nigerians and friends of Nigeria every year. They were instituted by the National Honors Act No. 5 of 1964, during the First Nigerian Republic, to honour Nigerians who have rendered service to the benefit of the nation.

These honours are distinct from the honours that are part of the country's ancient chieftaincy system, which is a separate (but also legally defined) entity. National Honours are the highest honours or awards that a citizen can receive from their country for service to the country.

== Honours ==
The Nigerian National Honours, in descending order of importance, are:

Ribbon	Name	Creation Date	Ranks	Description
	Order of the Federal Republic	1963	Grand Commander of the Order of the Federal Republic (GCFR); Commander of the Order of the Federal Republic (CFR); Officer of the Order of the Federal Republic (OFR); Member of the Order of the Federal Republic (MFR)	Customarily bestowed on former occupants of the office of President of Nigeria including former military heads of state of Nigeria.
	Order of the Niger	1963	Grand Commander of the Order of the Niger (GCON); Commander of the Order of the Niger (CON); Officer of the Order of the Niger (OON); Member of the Order of the Niger (MON)	Customarily respectively bestowed on former occupants of the office of Vice President of Nigeria including former Chiefs of General Staff. The GCON is also customarily bestowed on the Chief Justice of Nigeria and the President of the Nigerian Senate during their first year in office, while the CON is customarily bestowed on Justices of the Supreme Court of Nigeria.

== Medals ==
Ribbon	Name	Creation Date	Description
Defence Service Medal (Nigeria)	Defence Service Medal (DSM)		Honours those who fought on the government side during the Nigerian Civil War.
	Distinguished Service Medal (DSM)		
Forces Service Star (Nigeria)	Forces Service Star (FSS)		
General Service Medal (Nigeria)	General Service Medal (GSM)		
	Meritorious Service Star (MSS)		
National Service Medal (Nigeria)	National Service Medal (NSM)		
	Republic Medal (RM)	October 1, 1973	It was awarded to all serving members of the Nigerian Armed Forces on October 1, 1973, marking the 10th anniversary of the creation of the republic.

== State honours ==
Some Nigerian states also have state-specific honours which are bestowed on highly selective individuals, ranging from former presidents, governors to other distinguished personalities. An example of such are the Kogi State Honours which involve the conferment of State Honours in four different ranks of honour, including:

- Grand Confluence Silver Service Star
- Distinguished Confluence Silver Service Star (DCSSS)
- Confluence Merit Silver Service Star (CMSSS)
- Confluence Commendation Silver Service Star (CCSSS)

== Recognized awards of Nigerian traditional states ==
Name	Kingdom	Creation Date	Description
Royal Order of Iwere	Kingdom of Warri	2024	Established by Ogiame Atuwatse III, Olu of Warri. Second only to chieftainship in the kingdom.
Jigon Bauchi	Bauchi Emirate		
Jagoran Bauchi	Bauchi Emirate		
Dujiman Bauchi	Bauchi Emirate		Honours members of the civil service.
