= List of Nigerian Army full generals =

This is a list of full generals in the Nigerian Army. The rank of general (or full general to distinguish it from the lower general officer ranks) is the highest rank currently achievable by serving officers in the Nigerian Army. It is usually held by only the Chief of Defence Staff. It ranks above lieutenant-general and below field marshal which is only held as an honorary rank by the incumbent president of Nigeria in his capacity as the commander-in-chief of the Armed Forces of Nigeria.

Since 1960, only fourteen officers have attained this rank. Among them, five attained this rank while they were head of state, one officer Sani Abacha attained this rank before becoming head of state. Ten of them served as Chief of Defence Staff, two heads of state (Sani Abacha and Abdulsalami Abubakar) also served as Chiefs of Defence Staff.

No	Promoted	Name	Born	Died
1	1970	Yakubu Gowon	1934	
2	1976	Murtala Muhammed	1938	1976
3	1979	Olusegun Obasanjo	1937	
4	1987	Ibrahim Babangida	1941	
5	1990	Domkat Yah Bali	1940	2020
6	1990	Sani Abacha	1943	1998
7	1998	Abdulsalami Abubakar	1942	
8	7 June 2003	Alexander Ogomudia	1949	
9	30 May 2006	Martin Luther Agwai	1948	
10	2007	Owoye Andrew Azazi	1952	2012
11	August 2015	Abayomi Olonisakin	1961	
12	5 March 2021	Lucky Irabor	1965	
13	31 July 2023	Christopher Musa	1967	
14	30 October 2025	Olufemi Oluyede	1968	
