= National Defence Council (Nigeria) =

The National Defence Council (NDC) is a consultative body to the president of Nigeria on matters of the Nigerian Armed Forces and defence strategy. It advises the president on matters relating to the armed forces. The council was established in 1979, following the adoption of a federal presidential constitution and the inauguration of President Shehu Shagari. Its mandate is covered in the Third Schedule of the Constitution of Nigeria.

== Background ==
The president of Nigeria functions as the commander-in-chief of the armed forces, exercising his constitutional authority through the Ministry of Defence, which is responsible for the management of the military and its personnel. The operational head of the armed forces is the Chief of the Defence Staff, who is subordinate to the Minister of Defence.

== Members ==
Post	Photo	Incumbent
President and Commander-in-Chief of the Armed Forces (Chairman)	Portrait of Bola Tinubu	Bola Tinubu
Vice President of Nigeria		Kashim Shettima
National Security Adviser		Nuhu Ribadu
Minister of Defence		Christopher Gwabin Musa
Minister of State for Defence		Bello Matawalle
Chief of Defence Staff		Olufemi Oluyede
Chief of Army Staff		Waidi Shaibu
Chief of Naval Staff		Idi Abbas
Chief of Air Staff		Sunday Aneke

== See also ==
- National Security Council (Nigeria)
- Nigerian Armed Forces
