= Nigerian Defence Headquarters =

Headquarters of the Armed Forces of the Federal Republic of Nigeria

Defence Headquarters
- DHQ
- Armed Forces Complex, Area 7, Garki, Abuja, Federal Capital Territory in Nigeria

Site information
- Type: Military Headquarters
- Owner: Armed Forces of the Federal Republic of Nigeria
- Website: defenceinfo.mil.ng

Location
- Location in Nigeria
- Coordinates: 9°02′27″N 7°29′21″E

Garrison information
- Current commander: General Olufemi Oluyede

The Nigerian Defence Headquarters (DHQ) is the principal headquarters of the Nigerian Armed Forces. It is situated within the Armed Forces Complex, a sprawling military facility along the Muhammadu Buhari Way in Garki District of Abuja, which also houses the headquarters of the Nigerian Army, the Nigerian Air Force and, the Nigerian Navy.

The DHQ is responsible for deployment, sustenance and recovery of forces deployed externally or within the country. The DHQ is mandated to drive synergy among the tri-service of the Nigerian Armed Forces.

== History ==
Nigeria operated a variant of the Pakistani Joint Staff Headquarters and the American Pentagon structure. In the constitution that came after the 1979 Nigerian presidential election the Defence Headquarters (DHQ) was established to enable the CDS carry out his duties. It was abolished by the Buhari regime in 1983. The DHQ was reestablished and changed in 1985 to Joint Headquarters (JHQ) with the creation of the Chairman of the Joint Chiefs of Staff. In September 1990, the nomenclature reverted to the DHQ.

== Structure ==
The DHQ is structured into nine departments:
1. Department of Defence Policy and Plans (DDPP)
2. Department of Defence Training and Operations DDTO)
3. Department of Defence Administration (DDA)
4. Department of Defence Communications (DDC)
5. Department of Defence Logistics (DDL)
6. Department of Defence Standards and Evaluation (DDSE)
7. Department of Defence Transformation and Innovation (DDTI)
8. Department of Defence Accounts and Budgets (DDAB)
9. Department of Defence Civil-Military Relations (DDCMR)

== Components ==
The Defence Headquarters is made up of the following components:

- Nigerian Army
- Nigerian Navy
- Nigerian Air Force
- Ministry of Defence
- Defence Intelligence Agency
- Defence Space Administration
- National Defence College
- Nigerian Defence Academy
- Armed Forces Command and Staff College
- Defence Industries Corporation of Nigeria
- Multinational Joint Task Force
- Defence Health Maintenance Limited
- Military Pension Board
- Defence and Police Officers Wives Association

== Operations ==
It conducts joint cooperation ventures with TRADOC.
