= Ministry of Defence (Nigeria) =

Official defence body overseeing and supervising the Armed forces of Nigeria

Agency overview
- Formed: 1958; 68 years ago
- Type: Executive Department
- Jurisdiction: Federal Government of Nigeria
- Headquarters: Abuja
- Ministers responsible: Christopher Gwabin Musa, Minister of Defence; Bello Matawalle, Minister of State for Defence
- Agency executives: Dr Ibrahim Abubakar Kana mni, Permanent Secretary; Benson Usiholo Odaman, Director of Planning Research and Statistics; O. M. Mustapha, Director of Joint Services
- Parent department: Government of Nigeria
- Child agency: Nigerian Armed Forces (Army, Navy, Air Force); Defence Intelligence Agency
- Key document: Section 217-220 of the 1999 Constitution of Nigeria
- Website: http://defence.gov.ng

The Ministry of Defence is a government ministry in Nigeria with the statutory responsibility of overseeing and supervising the Nigerian Armed Forces. The Ministry of Defence is headed by the Minister of Defence, a cabinet-level head who reports directly to the President of the Federal Republic of Nigeria. Its main mission is to provide administrative and support services, timely and effectively to enable the Armed Forces of the Federal Republic of Nigeria.

== History ==
=== Early years ===
The Ministry of Defence came into being on 1 October 1958, when the War Office granted control of the armed forces to the national government - earlier discussions were made that made the establishment of Ministry of Defence. In 1956, at the time of the visit of Queen Elizabeth II, the Nigeria Regiment was renamed The Queen's Own Nigeria Regiment, Royal West African Frontier Force as a mark of allegiance to the Queen of the United Kingdom (and later the Queen of Nigeria). On 1 May 1958, the Naval Defence Force (NDF) was legally established as a force and re-designated Royal Nigerian Navy (RNN). On 1 June 1958, the British Army Council in London relinquished control of Nigerian Military Force (NMF) to the Nigerian Government. Upon its creation, the ministry was given responsibility over the two branches of the military in existence at that time the Royal Nigerian Army and the Royal Nigerian Navy and later oversaw the founding of the Nigerian Air Force in 1964.

=== Military government ===
Sani Abacha served as defence minister while also acting as head of state in the 1990s.

=== Democracy and reform ===
The goal of the defence ministry for the return of democratic rule was to reposition the military serve as defender of the elected constitutional government.

In April 2022, the Permanent Secretary Ibrahim Kana, announced that the federal government had concluded plans to create a brand new Ministry of Defence, with the goal being to have various services operating under the same roof in a "Pentagon-like style", enhancing civil-military co-operation and ending the dichotomy between the services and the ministry.

== Responsibilities ==
The objectives of the Ministry of Defence which are derived from the National Defence Policy are as follows:

- Maintaining men of the Nigerian Armed Forces in a state of combat readiness on land, sea and air.
- Maintaining a proper balance in arms and men to meet the needs of internal and external security;
- Making provision for the welfare of the men of the Armed Forces in terms of training, accommodation, health care and other benefits aimed at boosting their morale.
- Enhancing the capability and sophistication of the country’s Defence Industries in order to reduce the country's dependence on foreign sources of supply.
- Ensuring security in the African continent by the promotion of a collective defence system through bilateral, sub-regional and continental co-operation to ward off external aggression and to attain the African objective of the national foreign policy; and
- Contributing towards peace and stability in the world as a whole through the United Nations, African Union (AU) and Economic Community of West African States (ECOWAS).

== Organisation ==
The ministry is headquartered at the Ship House, Abuja. The organizational structure of the Ministry is made up of the civilian and military components. The Minister of Defence, appointed by the President of Nigeria with the consent of the Senate, is the political head of the Ministry of Defence. The Minister is sometimes assisted by the Minister of State. The Permanent Secretary is the Accounting and Chief Administrative Officer of the Ministry. He coordinates and directs the activities of the Departments and Units in the Ministry.

=== Military organization ===
The Armed Forces Services Headquarters of the Ministry comprise the following:

- Nigerian Defence Headquarters - Chief of the Defence Staff
- Nigerian Army Headquarters - Chief of Army Staff
- Nigerian Navy Headquarters - Chief of Naval Staff
- Nigerian Air Force Headquarters - Chief of Air Staff

The control of the Armed Forces, their joint operations and training rest with the Chief of Defence Staff Nigeria who coordinates the three Services while the three Service Chiefs are responsible for the day to day running of their respective Services.

=== Civilian organization ===
The civilization cell are nine operational departments within the Ministry each headed by a civilian director:

- Joint Services
- Army Affairs
- Navy Affairs
- Air Force Affairs
- Human Resources
- Planning & Statistics
- Finance & Accounts
- Procurement and Legal Departments

The civilian cell under the operational control of a civilian Director of the Nigerian Civil Service with others including:

- Human Resource Management Department
- Finance and Accounts Department
- Planning, Research and Statistics Department
- Procurement Department
- Legal Department
- Medical Services Department
- Education Department
- General Services Department
- Information and Public Relations Department
- Reforms Coordination and Services Improvement Department

Recently, the Office of the Director under the (Office of the Permanent Secretary) Special Duties was created to oversee the following units in the Ministry:

- Ministerial SERVICOM Unit
- Reform Unit
- Internal Audit
- Anti-Corruption and Transparency Unit
- Stock Verification Unit
- Protocol Unit
- Press and Public Relations Unit

=== Parastatals and agencies ===
In addition, three agencies are subsumed under the Ministry: The Defence Mission, the Defence Intelligence Agency (DIA), and the Defence Intelligence School. Other defence parastatals include the Military Pension Board (MPB), Nigerian Armed Forces Resettlement Centre (NAFRC), and the Defence Industries Corporation of Nigeria (DICON). The Ministry of Defence also supervises tri-service training institutions, including the National Defence College (NDC), Armed Forces Command and Staff College, Jaji (AFCSC), and the Nigerian Defence Academy (NDA).

== See also ==
- House Committee on Defense
