= Chief of Defence Staff (Nigeria) =

Professional head of the Nigerian Armed Forces

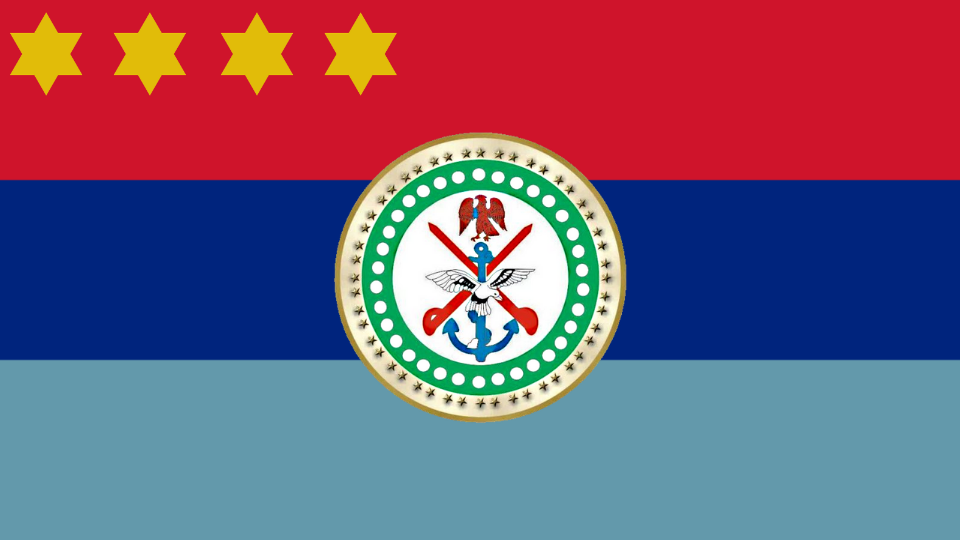
- Standard of the chief of defence staff
- Incumbent; General Olufemi Oluyede since 30 October 2025
- Ministry of Defence
- Abbreviation: CDS
- Member of: National Security Council; National Defence Council
- Reports to: Minister of Defence
- Seat: Defence Headquarters, Abuja
- Appointer: President of Nigeria; with advice and consent from Senate
- Constituting instrument: Constitution of Nigeria
- Formation: 1979 (47 years ago)
- First holder: Ipoola Alani Akinrinade
- Website: Official website

The chief of defence staff (CDS) is the head of the Nigerian Armed Forces and the most senior uniformed military adviser to the minister of defence and the president of Nigeria. The chief of the defence staff is based at the Defence Headquarters, Abuja and works alongside the permanent secretary of defence.

It is occupied by the most senior commissioned officer appointed by the president of Nigeria. The position was established for the first time under Nigeria's 1979 constitution.

The current chief of defence staff is General Olufemi Oluyede, who succeeded General Christopher Musa in October 2025

== Role ==
The chief of defence staff gives operational directives to the Nigerian Armed Forces through the service chiefs and reports to the commander-in-chief with administrative supervision of the minister of defence. It is the duty and responsibility of the CDS to formulate and execute policies, programmes towards the highest attainment of national security and operational competence of the Armed Forces namely; the Army, Navy and Air Force.

The CDS is assisted by the other service chiefs:

- Chief of Army Staff
- Chief of the Naval Staff
- Chief of the Air Staff

== List of Chiefs of Defence Staff ==
The chiefs have been:

| No. | Portrait | Chief of Defence Staff | Took office | Left office | Time in office | Defence branch | Ref. |
|---|---|---|---|---|---|---|---|
| 1 | Ipoola Alani Akinrinade | Lieutenant General; Ipoola Alani Akinrinade (born 1939) | 15 April 1980 | 2 October 1981 | 1 year, 170 days | Nigerian Army | – |
| 2 | Gibson Jalo | Lieutenant General; Gibson Jalo (1939–2000) | 2 October 1981 | 31 December 1983 | 2 years, 90 days | Nigerian Army | – |
| 3 | Domkat Bali | General; Domkat Bali (1940–2020); Defence Minister | 1 January 1984 | 29 December 1989 | 5 years, 362 days | Nigerian Army | – |
| 4 | Sani Abacha | General; Sani Abacha (1943–1998) later military ruler | 29 December 1989 | 17 November 1993 | 3 years, 323 days | Nigerian Army | – |
| 5 | Oladipo Diya | Lieutenant General; Oladipo Diya (1944–2023); Chief of General Staff | 17 November 1993 | 21 December 1997 | 4 years, 34 days | Nigerian Army | – |
| 6 | Abdulsalami Abubakar | Major General; Abdulsalami Abubakar (born 1942) later military ruler | 21 December 1997 | 9 June 1998 | 170 days | Nigerian Army | – |
| 7 | Al-Amin Daggash | Air Marshal; Al-Amin Daggash (born 1942) | 9 June 1998 | 29 May 1999 | 354 days | Nigerian Air Force | – |
| 8 | Ibrahim Ogohi | Admiral; Ibrahim Ogohi (1948–2024) | 29 May 1999 | 27 June 2003 | 4 years, 29 days | Nigerian Navy | – |
| 9 | Alexander Ogomudia | General; Alexander Ogomudia (born 1949) | 27 June 2003 | 1 June 2006 | 2 years, 339 days | Nigerian Army | – |
| 10 | Martin Luther Agwai | General; Martin Luther Agwai (born 1948); Later Commander of the UNAMID | 1 June 2006 | 25 May 2007 | 358 days | Nigerian Army | – |
| 11 | Owoye Andrew Azazi | General; Owoye Andrew Azazi (1952–2012) | 25 May 2007 | 20 August 2008 | 1 year, 87 days | Nigerian Army | – |
| 12 | Paul Dike | Air Chief Marshal; Paul Dike (born 1950) | 20 August 2008 | 8 September 2010 | 2 years, 19 days | Nigerian Air Force | – |
| 13 | Oluseyi Petinrin | Air Chief Marshal; Oluseyi Petinrin (born 1955) | 8 September 2010 | 4 October 2012 | 2 years, 26 days | Nigerian Air Force | – |
| 14 | Ola Ibrahim | Admiral; Ola Ibrahim (born 1955) | 4 October 2012 | 20 January 2014 | 1 year, 108 days | Nigerian Navy | – |
| 15 | Alex Sabundu Badeh | Air Chief Marshal; Alex Sabundu Badeh (1957–2018) | 20 January 2014 | 21 July 2015 | 1 year, 182 days | Nigerian Air Force | – |
| 16 | Abayomi Gabriel Olonisakin | General; Abayomi Gabriel Olonisakin (born 1961) | 21 July 2015 | 29 January 2021 | 5 years, 192 days | Nigerian Army | – |
| 17 | Lucky Irabor | General; Lucky Irabor (born 1965) | 29 January 2021 | 23 June 2023 | 2 years, 145 days | Nigerian Army | – |
| 18 | Christopher Gwabin Musa | General; Christopher Gwabin Musa (born 1967) | 23 June 2023 | 30 October 2025 | 2 years, 129 days | Nigerian Army | – |
| 19 | Olufemi Oluyede | General; Olufemi Oluyede (born 1968) | 30 October 2025 | Incumbent | 1 year, 10 days | Nigerian Army | – |
