= Nigerian military airstrikes on civilians =

Flag of the Nigerian Armed Forces

The Nigerian Military has carried out a number of airstrikes that claimed civilian lives in the country, which the government and the military explained as being erroneous or targeted non-state actors. These airstrikes happened in a number of states battling with insecurity as a result of terrorists' and bandits' activities. The recent of such attacks happened in Tudun Biri village of Kaduna state on Sunday 3 December 2023, when two military airstrikes hit the villagers celebrating an Islamic Festival which resulted in the death of more 120 according to Amnesty International.

== Airstrikes by Nigerian military on civilians ==
=== Kaduna ===
In December 2023, two military airstrikes hit residents of Tudun Biri village of Kaduna state who were celebrating an Islamic Festival. The strikes resulted in the death of more 120 according to many sources including the Amnesty International. However, government sources indicated that the erroneous attacks killed 81 people.
