= Ibrahim Ogohi =

8th Chief of Defence Staff of Nigeria (1948–2024)

Admiral Ibrahim Ogohi CFR MSS PSC

Chief of Defence Staff
- In office 29 May 1999 – 27 June 2003
- Preceded by: Air Mash. Al-Amin Daggash
- Succeeded by: Gen. Alexander Ogomudia

Personal details
- Born: 14 November 1948 Colony and Protectorate of Nigeria
- Died: 30 June 2024 (aged 75) Abuja, Nigeria

Military service
- Allegiance: Nigeria
- Branch/service: Nigerian Navy
- Years of service: 1970–2003
- Rank: Admiral
- Unit: Nigerian Navy

Ibrahim Ogohi CFR FSS MSS PSC, (14 November 1948 – 30 June 2024) was a Nigerian Navy admiral, who was the first naval officer to become Chief of Defence Staff of Nigeria from 1999 to 2003 and the first Naval Officer to reach four star rank in the Nigerian military during the civilian administration of Nigeria.

== Background ==
Ogohi had his early education in St John's College Kaduna from 1962 to 1966. He enrolled in the Nigeria Defence Academy in 1967 in regular course 4 passing out in 1970 and then the Midshipman's course in the United Kingdom in 1971 and the technical course in India in 1972, the underwater Warfare Course in India in 1976 then the United States Naval War College Course in 1980 and in 1992.

He was Commanding officer Eken NNS France in 1982, commander NNS Anansa in 1985 and director Administrator at the Nigeria Defence Academy in 1986 to 1987. In 1992 he was commanding directing staff at the National War College and deputy commandant of the Armed forces command staff College, Jaji in 1995. In May 1999 he was Chief of Defence Staff till 2003.

Ogohi died on 30 June 2024, at the age of 75.
