= Defence Space Administration (Nigeria) =

Tri-service space agency

Defence Space Administration (DSA)
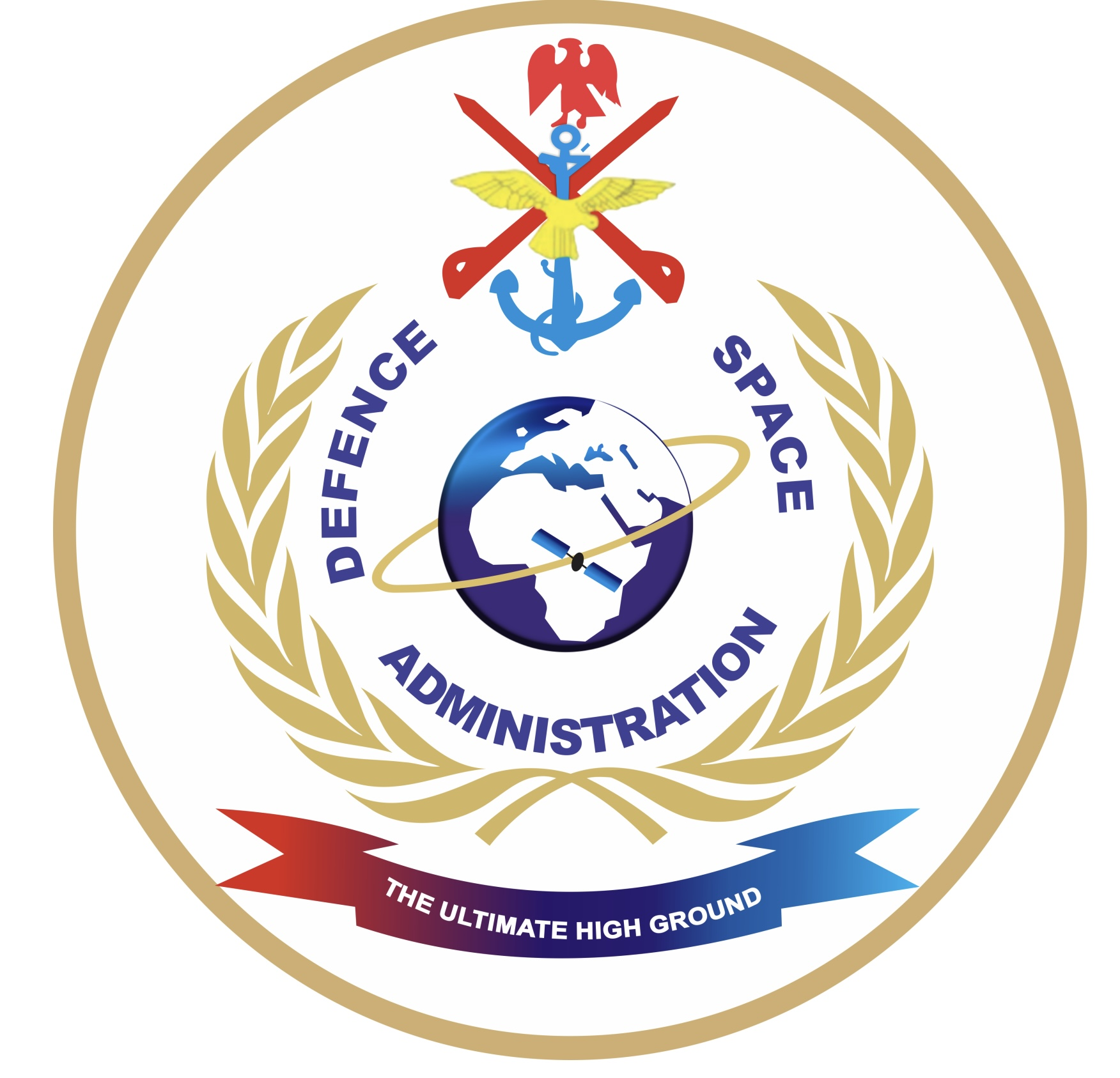
- Emblem of the Defence Space Administration

Agency overview
- Formed: 9 October 2014; 11 years ago
- Type: Tri-service space agency, satellite communications, geospatial intelligence, and cyber warfare
- Jurisdiction: Federal Republic of Nigeria
- Headquarters: Obasanjo Space Centre, Lugbe, Airport Road, Abuja, Nigeria
- Motto: "Exploiting Space Domain for National Security"
- Employees: classified
- Annual budget: classified
- Agency executives: Bola Ahmed Tinubu, President of Nigeria; Major General Philip O. Ilodibia., Chief of Defence Space Administration (CDSA)
- Parent agency: Ministry of Defence
- Website: http://dsa.mil.ng

The Defence Space Administration (DSA) is a tri-service space research and development agency under the Ministry of Defence of the Federal Republic of Nigeria. The DSA is tasked with providing resilient space-based capabilities, satellite communication, and geospatial intelligence to the Armed Forces of Nigeria (AFN) and other security agencies to protect the nation's territorial integrity. The DSA draws personnel from all three branches of the Armed Forces.

== History ==
The agency was originally established on 09th of October 2014 as the Defence Space Agency. It was later renamed the Defence Space Administration following the enactment of the Defence Space Administration Act, 2016 by the National Assembly.

The creation of the DSA was driven by the Nigerian government's recognition of space as a critical domain for modern warfare, national security, and border surveillance. It was designed to collaborate with civilian space institutions, primarily the National Space Research and Development Agency (NASRDA), while focusing strictly on the defense, intelligence, and security architectures of the nation.

Leadership

The administration is headed by a Chief of Defence Space Administration (CDSA), who is typically a high-ranking military officer (usually a Major General, Rear Admiral, or Air Vice Marshal) appointed by the President of Nigeria on the recommendation of the Minister of Defence.

== Mandate and Objectives ==
The core mandate of the DSA includes:

- Satellite Operations: Launching, operating, and maintaining military and dual-use satellites for secure communication and reconnaissance.
- Geospatial Intelligence: Providing real-time geographic data and imagery to support counter-insurgency and internal security operations.
- Cyber and Electronic Warfare: Developing secure cyber-defense capabilities within the space and digital domains to safeguard military networks.
- Capacity Building: Training personnel of the Nigerian Army, Navy, and Air Force in specialized aerospace engineering, satellite control, and data analysis.

== Space Assets ==
The DSA deploys a mix of dedicated military orbital hardware alongside integrated dual-use assets shared with civilian agencies like the National Space Research and Development Agency (NASRDA).

=== DELSAT-1 ===
Inaugurated in December 2022, DELSAT-1 is Nigeria's first dedicated military reconnaissance satellite. Operating as an integrated earth-observation platform, the satellite interfaces directly with national security frameworks to track criminal routes, conduct structural vulnerability assessments, provide terrain analytics, and monitor tactical insurgent positioning. It also facilitates maritime surveillance against piracy and oil bunkering in the Gulf of Guinea.

=== Shared and Complementary Systems ===
- NigComSat-1R: Operated in tandem with Nigerian Communications Satellite Limited, this asset provides high-bandwidth, redundant communication relays to secure military communications in areas lacking terrestrial network infrastructure.
- NigeriaSat Constellation: The DSA leverages optical data from civilian imaging satellites (including NigeriaSat-2 and NigeriaSat-X) for environmental mapping and long-term surveillance over dense forest regions.
- Modular Earth Observation Outpost: A localized tactical ground deployment interface designed to pull real-time remote-sensing imagery and feed intelligence directly to frontline combat commanders.

=== Slated and Upcoming Assets ===
To transition from shared dual-use systems toward comprehensive orbital sovereignty, the Federal Government of Nigeria approved an expanded procurement framework for dedicated defense infrastructure.

- DELSAT-2 and DELSAT-3: Slated follow-on military reconnaissance satellites designed to expand Nigeria's sovereign orbital constellation, ensuring high-frequency revisit times over regional conflict zones.
- Synthetic Aperture Radar (SAR) Constellation: Active procurement cycles include the integration of dedicated radar-imaging satellites. Unlike existing optical sensors, these upcoming SAR assets are intended to pierce dense cloud cover, dust storms, and operate in total darkness to maintain 24/7 continuous surveillance across porous international borders.

== Infrastructure and Capabilities ==
The DSA operates from its headquarters in Abuja, Nigeria, and houses several specialized centers, including:

1. Main Mission Control Centre (MMCC) The nerve center of the administration, responsible for real-time tracking, telemetry, and commanding of deployed space assets.

2. Directorate of Navigation and Position, Navigation, and Timing (PNT) Focuses on tracking systems, logistics, and precision-guided support for military hardware on the field.

3. Imagery and Geospatial Intelligence Center Processes satellite imagery to track criminal activities, terrorist movements, and maritime piracy in the Gulf of Guinea.

== List of Chiefs of Defence Space Administration ==
- Air Vice Marshal TV Udoh (Former CDSA)
- Rear Admiral Williams Kayoda (Former CDSA)
- Air Vice Marshal Abdullahi Shinkafi (Former CDSA)
- Air Vice Marshal Lanre Ibrahim Oluwatoyin (Former CDSA)
- Major General Philip O. Ilodibia (Incumbent CDSA)

== See also ==
- Armed Forces of Nigeria
- National Space Research and Development Agency (NASRDA)
- Ministry of Defence (Nigeria)
