= Military ranks of Nigeria =

The Military ranks of Nigeria are the military insignia used by the Nigerian Armed Forces. Nigeria shares a rank structure similar to that of the United Kingdom.

== Commissioned officers ranks ==
The rank insignia of commissioned officers.

Rank group	General / flag officers					Senior officers			Junior officers
Nigerian Army
Nigerian Army	Field marshal	General	Lieutenant general	Major general	Brigadier-general	Colonel	Lieutenant colonel	Major	Captain	Lieutenant	Second lieutenant
Nigerian Navy
Nigerian Navy	Admiral of the Fleet	Admiral	Vice admiral	Rear admiral	Commodore	Captain	Commander	Lieutenant commander	Lieutenant	Sub-Lieutenant	Midshipman
Nigerian Air Force
Nigerian Air Force	Marshal of the air force	Air chief marshal	Air marshal	Air vice-marshal	Air commodore	Group captain	Wing commander	Squadron leader	Flight lieutenant	Flying officer	Pilot officer
Rank group	General / flag officers					Senior officers			Junior officers

== Other ranks ==
The rank insignia of non-commissioned officers and enlisted personnel.

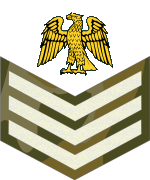
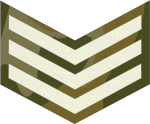
Rank group	Senior NCOs					Junior NCOs		Enlisted
Nigerian Army								No insignia
Nigerian Army	Army warrant officer	Master warrant officer	Warrant officer	Staff sergeant	Sergeant	Corporal	Lance corporal	Private (or equivalent)
Nigerian Navy									No insignia
Nigerian Navy	Navy Warrant Officer	Master Warrant Officer	Warrant Officer		Petty officer	Leading seaman	Able seaman	Seaman	Ordinary seaman
Nigerian Air Force								No insignia
Nigerian Air Force	Air warrant officer	Master warrant officer	Warrant officer	Flight sergeant	Sergeant	Corporal	Lance corporal	Aircraftman
Rank group	Senior NCOs					Junior NCOs		Enlisted
