= Air Force Military School, Jos =

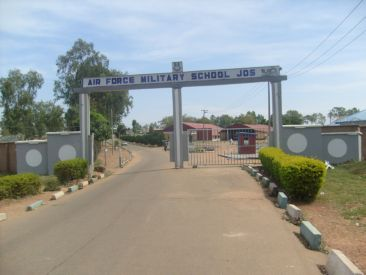
- School gate

Location
- Jos, Plateau State, Nigeria
- 9°52′13″N 8°53′30″E

Information
- Other name: AFMS
- Type: Military school
- Motto: Strive to excel
- Established: 18 September 1980; 45 years ago
- Authority: Nigerian Air Force
- Commandant: Gp Cpt AF FUNSHO-AKO
- Gender: Boys only
- Affiliation: Nigerian Air Force
- Website: www.afms.org.ng

Air Force Military School, Jos (AFMS) is a military and academic institution located in Jos, Plateau State, Nigeria. Established on 18 September 1980, the school has graduated over 3,794 junior airmen as of August 2022.

The school is effectively a military institution (part of the Nigerian Air Force) that provides both normal secondary school education and military training to Nigerian boys aged around 11 to 17 years. Students on the one hand receive education in subjects like mathematics, physics, geography, and French, and on the other hand get trained in military weaponry and tactics. The military training seems geared to encourage a career in the Nigerian armed forces and many graduates have gone on to become commissioned officers in the army, air force, and navy.

== Military training program ==
Junior Airmen (JAM) receive field and weapons training, and are also schooled in map reading and interpretation, field craft, drill, point to point compass march, route march, sports, obstacle crossing, abseiling, assembling and stripping of rifles, mock war, shooting range and bush camping amongst other military and academic activities.

== Beyond AFMS ==
Upon completion and graduation of a junior airman six years of secondary school studies they automatically acquire the title of EXJAM (Ex Junior Airman).

Records available to the school show that most of the ex-Junior Airmen are presently serving the nation, not only as military personnel but as productive workers in the various facets of the public and private sectors.
