= Abdulsalami Abubakar =

Military head of state of Nigeria from 1998 to 1999

General Abdulsalami Abubakar GCFR
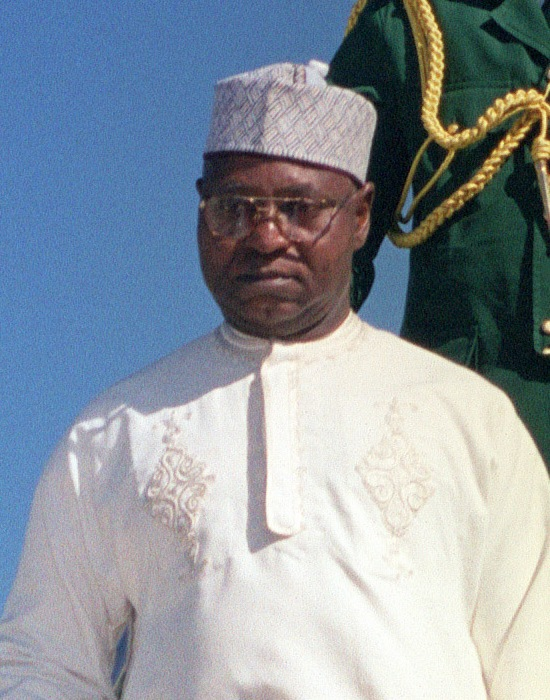

11th Head of State of Nigeria
- In office 9 June 1998 – 29 May 1999
- CGS: Michael Akhigbe
- Preceded by: Sani Abacha
- Succeeded by: Olusegun Obasanjo

Minister of Defence
- In office 9 June 1998 – 29 May 1999
- President: Himself
- Preceded by: Sani Abacha
- Succeeded by: Theophilus Danjuma

Chief of General Staff
- In office 21 December 1997 – 9 June 1998
- Preceded by: Oladipo Diya
- Succeeded by: Al-Amin Daggash

Personal details
- Born: 13 June 1942 (age 84) Minna, Northern Region, British Nigeria (now Minna, Niger State, Nigeria)
- Spouse: Fati Lami Abubakar
- Children: 7
- Occupation: Military officer

Military service
- Allegiance: Nigeria
- Branch: Nigerian Air Force; Nigerian Army
- Service years: 1963–1966 (Air Force); 1966–1999 (Army)
- Rank: General
- Conflicts: Nigerian Civil War; 1978 South Lebanon conflict

Abdulsalami Abubakar GCFR (/ˌɑːbdəlsəˈlæmi ˌɑːbuˈbɑːkɑːr/; born 13 June 1942) is a retired Nigerian army general who served as the military head of state of Nigeria from 1998 to 1999. He was also Chief of Defence Staff from 1997 to 1998. He succeeded General Sani Abacha upon the latter's death.

During his leadership, Nigeria adopted a modified version of the 1979 constitution, which provided for multiparty elections. He transferred power to president-elect Olusegun Obasanjo on 29 May 1999. He is the current Chairman of the National Peace Committee.

== Early life ==
Abubakar, an ethnic Hausa, was born on 13 June 1942 to Abubakar Jibrin and Fatikande Mohammed, in Minna, Niger State, Nigeria.

From 1950 to 1956 he attended Minna Native Authority Primary school. From 1957 to 1962, he had his secondary school education at Government College, Bida, Niger State. From January to October 1963, he studied at Kaduna Technical College.

== Military careers ==
=== Air force career ===
Abubakar is a member of the pioneering sets of officer cadets who enlisted into the Nigerian Air force on 3 October 1963. From 1964- 1966, he was flown to Uetersen, West Germany with a team of officer cadets, for Basic and Advanced Military Training. When he returned to Nigeria in 1966, he was seconded to the Nigerian Army.

=== Career in the army ===
After joining the army in 1966 as an officer cadet, Abubakar attended the emergency combatant short service course two. In October 1967, Abubakar was commissioned second lieutenant, infantry division, Nigerian army. From 1967 to 1968, Abubakar was general staff officer two, second garrison, and commanding officer, 92 infantry battalion from 1969 to 1974. Between 1974 and 1975, he was made brigade major, 7th infantry brigade. In 1975 he served as commanding officer, 84 infantry battalion. In 1978–1979, Abubakar was commanding officer for the 145 infantry battalion (NIBATT II), United Nations Interim force, Lebanon.

In 1979 he was made assistant adjutant general 3rd Infantry division, Nigeria. From 1980 to 1982, Abubakar was chief instructor at the Nigerian Defence Academy. In 1982 he was appointed as the colonel of administration and quartering, 1st mechanised division. A position he held up until 1984. From 1985 to 1986, Abubakar was the commander 3rd Mechanised Brigade. He served as the military secretary of the army, 1986–1988. Abubakar was made general officer commanding 1st mechanised division 1990–1991. Between 1991 and 1993, he was the principal staff officer, as the army chief of plan and policy, Defence Headquarters.

From 1997 to 1998, General Sani Abacha appointed Abubakar as the Chief of Defence Staff. Upon Abacha's death on 8 June 1998, Abubakar was named military President and Commander in Chief of the Armed Forces of the Federal Republic of Nigeria.

== Head of State ==
=== Military ===
Nigeria had been ruled by military leaders since Muhammadu Buhari seized power from Shehu Shagari in a 1983 coup. Although democratic elections had been held in 1993, they were annulled by General Ibrahim Babangida. Abubakar was sworn in as military head of state on 9 June 1998 after the sudden death of Abacha. He declared a weeklong period of national mourning.

=== Politics ===
A few days after assuming office, Abubakar promised to hold elections within a year and transfer power to an elected president. His government established the Independent National Electoral Commission (INEC), appointing former Supreme Court Justice Ephraim Akpata as its chairman.

The INEC held a series of elections, first for Local Government Areas in December 1998, then for State Assemblies and Governors, National Assemblies and finally for the President on 27 February 1999. Although efforts were made to ensure that the elections were free and fair, there were widespread irregularities that drew criticism from foreign observers.

In terms of economics his government advocated for an privateisation programme which was announced on the 20 July 1998 by H.E Gen Abdulsalami Abubakar. The government retained 40% of the telecom, electricity, petroleum refineries, coal and bitumen production, tourism, and spill-overs from the first phase of privatisation equities of the affected enterprises whilst 40% will be alienated to strategic investors with the right technical, financial and management capabilities. Abubakar's political economy was said to be almost a direct diversion from that of his predecessors to acquire international legitimacy. Further he advocated for economic liberalization, deregulation and foreign investment.

=== Transfer of power ===
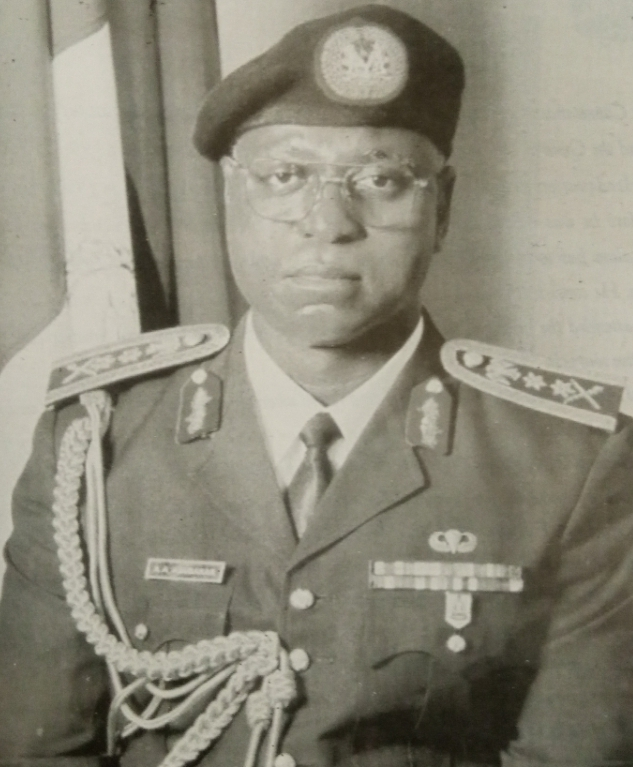
Abubakar as a military officer

Surprising some critics of the country's military, in May 1999 General Abubakar handed over power to the newly elected civilian president, Olusegun Obasanjo, and retired from the army.

== Legacy ==
Abubakar's legacy is mixed. A lecture circuit at Chicago State University in Chicago, Illinois, United States featuring him encountered opposition, because he had supported Abacha's government. (Abacha's administration was notorious for its human rights abuses.) He was also sued in that country by other Nigerians who claimed he was responsible for the death of 1993 president-elect Moshood Kashimawo Olawale Abiola, who died in custody after being prevented by the military from taking office, and for the violation of the rights of others during his administration. Abubakar helped in the Liberian peace movement by presiding over the 2003 peace talks between Charles Taylor and the opposing rebels. This is seen in the movie Pray the Devil Back to Hell. Abubakar also chaired the Commonwealth Observer Group to the Zimbabwe presidential election in 2002, which concluded that "the conditions in Zimbabwe did not adequately allow for a free expression of will by the electors".

== Personal life ==
Abubakar is married to Fati and they have six children together.

== Health ==
On 12 July 2025, it was reported that Abubakar was suffering from an undisclosed illness and was admitted in the same London hospital as former Nigerian President Muhammadu Buhari. They had known each other since 1962. Abubakar later confirmed this noting that he had been discharged from the London hospital shortly before Buhari died.

== Awards and honours ==
Abudulsalami Abubakar has received several awards and medals. In alphabetical order they include:

- Defence Service Medal (DSM)
- Distinguished Service Medal (DSM)
- Forces Service Star (FSS)
- General Service Medal (GSM)
- Grand Commander of the Order of the Federal Republic of Nigeria (GCFR)
- International Gold Medal, of the Economic Community of West African States
- Meritorious Service Star (MSS)
- National Service Medal (NSM)
- Republic Medal (RM)
- Rainbow/PUSH Coalition Peace Prize
- Silver Jubilee Medal (SJM)
- Order of the Star of Ghana
- Ufuk Dialogue Peace Award 2022

== Bibliography ==
- Abubakar, Abdulsalami. (1998) Nigeria: A new beginning. Publisher: Federal Ministry of Information and Culture. ASIN: B0006FDZZG

== See also ==
- Nigerian Third Republic
- Nigerian Fourth Republic
- List of Hausa people

Political offices
Preceded by Sani Abacha	Chairman of the Provisional Ruling Council of Nigeria; 1998–1999	Succeeded by Olusegun Obasanjo as President of Nigeria
Preceded by Sani Abacha	Chairman of the Economic Community of West African States; 1998–1999	Succeeded by Gnassingbé Eyadéma
