= Thomas Aguiyi-Ironsi =

Nigerian Career Diplomat (born c. 1953)

Minister of State for Defence
- In office 30 August 2006 – 28 May 2007
- President: Olusegun Obasanjo
- Minister: Rabiu Kwankwaso
- Preceded by: Roland Oritsejafor

Personal details
- Born: c 1953 (age 72–73) Kaduna, Northern Region, British Nigeria (now in Kaduna State, Nigeria)
- Parents: Johnson Aguiyi-Ironsi; Victoria Aguiyi-Ironsi

Thomas Aguiyi-Ironsi (born c. 1953) is a career diplomat who was appointed by President Obasanjo to serve as a technocrat minister.He held the position of Minister of State for Defence from January to May 2007 and later became Minister of Defence, making him the first Igbo person to hold this role in over 40 years.He is the son of former military leader Major General Johnson Aguiyi-Ironsi, and was the ambassador to Togo before former President Olusegun Obasanjo appointed him to succeed Roland Oritsejafor as Minister of state for Defence.

While Aguiyi-Ironsi was Ambassador to Togo, the choices to replace the outgoing Foreign Minister, Ngozi Okonjo-Iweala, were reportedly narrowed down to him and Joy Ogwu. However, after Obasanjo fired Oritsejafor, Aguiyi-Ironsi received the job of Defence Minister while Ogwu became foreign minister. The two were sworn in on 30 August 2006.

On 24 January 2007, Aguiyi-Ironsi announced that Nigeria would send a battalion of peacekeeping troops to Somalia.

Preceded by Rabiu Kwankwaso	Minister of Defence of Nigeria; 30 August 2006 – 26 July 2007	Succeeded by Yayale Ahmed
