= Akanbi Oniyangi =

Nigerian politician

- Akanbi Mahmoud Oniyangi

Minister of Defence
- In office February 1982 – October 1983
- President: Shehu Shagari
- Preceded by: Iya Abubakar
- Succeeded by: Domkat Bali

Minister of Communications
- In office December 1979 – February 1982
- President: Shehu Shagari
- Succeeded by: Audu Ogbeh

Personal details
- Born: February 10, 1930 Ilorin, Kwara State, Nigeria
- Died: 17 January 2006 Nigeria
- Education: Ahmadu Bello University
- Profession: Lawyer

Akanbi Mahmoud Oniyangi (1930 – 17 January 2006) was a Nigerian politician and former Minister for Commerce and Defence during the aborted second republic. He was born in Kwara State and was educated at Ahmadu Bello University, Zaria. He was a lawyer and Community leader before entering politics.

During his tenure as Defence Minister, he tried to the improve Nigeria's strained relationship with its neighbors. Chad was having merger talks with Libya and was under a peacekeeping force and Cameroon was having border disputes with Nigeria.
