= Martin Luther Agwai =

10th Chief of Defence Staff of Nigeria (born 1948)

General Martin Luther Agwai CFR FSS MSS DSS fwc
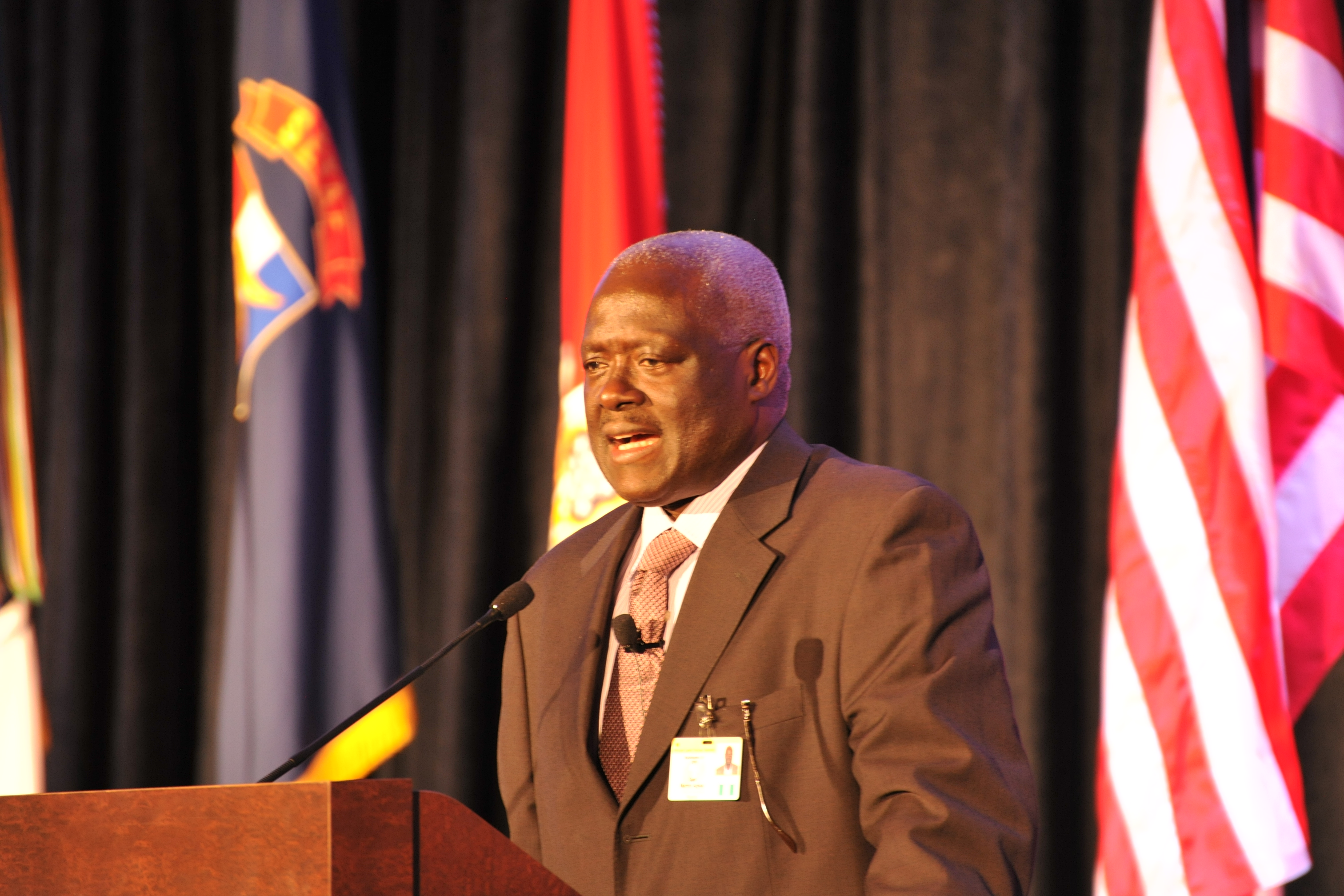
- Agwai in May 2010

Chief of Defence Staff
- In office 1 June 2006 – 25 May 2007
- Preceded by: Gen. A.O. Ogomudia
- Succeeded by: Gen. O.A. Azazi

Chief of Army Staff
- In office June 2003 – May 2006
- Preceded by: Lt-Gen. A. O. Ogomudia
- Succeeded by: Lt-Gen. O. A. Azazi

Personal details
- Born: 8 November 1948 (age 77) Kaduna, Northern Region, British Nigeria (now in Kaduna State, Nigeria)
- Education: National Defense University; Command and Staff College, Jaji
- Awards: Force Service Star; Meritorious Service Star; Distinguished Service Star; Fellow of the War College; Commander of the Federal Republic

Military service
- Allegiance: Nigeria
- Branch/service: Nigerian Army
- Years of service: 1970–2009
- Rank: General
- Commands: Chief of Army Staff; Chief of Defence Staff; United Nations Advisor; Deputy Force Commander of the United Nations Mission in Sierra Leone; Force Commander of the African Union - United Nations Hybrid Operation in Darfur

Martin Luther Agwai CFR FSS MSS DSS fwc (born 8 November 1948) is a retired Nigerian Army general who served as Chief of Defence Staff and Chief of Army Staff. He was the 13th Pro-Chancellor and Chairman of Governing Council of the University of Calabar

== Early life and education ==
Agwai was born on 8 November 1948, in Kagoro a city in Southern Kaduna Kaduna, a city in Northern Nigeria, to the family of Agwai Gidan Mana, a Police Constable and Shera Agwai, a housewife. He hailed from Gidan Mana in Kachia Local Government Area of present-day Kaduna state.

He hails from a Christian home and later became the President of Fellowship of Christian Students at Government Secondary School, Zaria in 1967.

He started out his primary education at the Native Authority School in Jaban Kogo where he was living with his maternal grandmother. He was soon moved to the Sudan Interior Mission (SIM) School, in Kurmin Musa, due to his insistence on changing schools. According to his friend and classmate, Stephen Haruna Makeri, 'we liked each other because we were the smallest in the class. Martin was very lively and sociable and that was what drew me close to him.'

He graduated from the Nigerian Command and Staff College, British Army Staff College, Camberley and United States Army Armor School amongst others. He holds a Post Graduate diploma in Public Administration with distinctions from the Administrative Staff College of Nigeria (ASCON) and National Defence University, Washington, D.C., where he obtained a Master of Science in National Resource Strategy. While at NDU, he won the Ambassadors Award for excellence in research and writing, making him the first foreigner to win the award.

== Career ==
He was commissioned into the Nigerian Armed Forces in 1972 and has held several positions including Chief of Training and Operations of the Nigerian Armed Forces and Director of Military Training at the Nigerian Defence Academy, Kaduna. He was the Nigerian Military Adviser at Harare, covering the whole of Southern Africa between 1993 - 1996. He was a Directing Staff and Chief Instructor at the Command and Staff College Jaji - Kaduna, Nigeria. Before becoming the Chief of Army Staff he was the Deputy Military Adviser at United Nations Headquarters, New York. He was the Chief of Defence Staff of the Nigerian Armed Forces since 1 June 2006. Before that, he held several senior positions in the Nigerian Army, including being Chief of Army Staff. He served as the commander of the combined United Nations-African Union peacekeeping force in Darfur. General Agwai led one of the biggest peacekeeping operations in the world with approximately 20,000 troops and 6,000 police under his command.

In a statement made available on BBC, he was quoted to have said that: "We are not here to conquer anybody, We are not here to compel any peace. We are here to work with the Sudanese people - both the government and the parties to assist them to find peace. We are not here to impose peace. We are not here to fight anybody."

Much of his rich military life and career was captured in a biography project commissioned by the National Defence College Abuja. The focus of the 268 paged work was his exploits as Former Chief of Army Staff, Chief of Defence Staff, and Force Commander of the Hybrid United Nations - African Union Mission in Darfur (UNAMID). Other parts of his life are also given due attention in the book- Iconic Soldier and Peacemaker. A Biography of Martin Luther Agwai.

== Retirement ==
General Martin Luther Agwai retired from the Nigerian Armed Forces in December 2009. The Minister of Defence, Retired Maj-Gen Abbe said "the magnificent parade accorded Agwai is an indication that the nation is happy... the country is proud to produce a fine officer and a gentleman who gave a good account of himself. I am expressing the Commander-in-Chief's pleasure, President Umaru Yar'Adua for the service he had rendered to his country and beyond and that is what an officer should be".

In his honour, The Martin Luther Agwai International Leadership & Peacekeeping Centre (MLAILPKC) was instituted after his retirement, by General TY Buratai. The Mission of MLAILPKC is to deliver realistic qualitative training packages on Peace Support Operations to potential United Nations and regional peacekeepers to prepare them for the complex and multidimensional challenges of modern Peace Support Operations.

The National Defence College Abuja also commissioned a research project aimed to promote values of leadership garnered from the lives and careers of strategic leaders. The project had Martin Luther Agwai as the first in a series of leaders to be studied. Through the efforts of the Centre for Strategic Research and Studies, in collaboration with a biography company in Nigeria, May University Press Limited, Lagos state, the research was done and the findings published in a book - Iconic Soldier and Peacemaker. A Biography of Martin Luther Agwai. The book was launched in February 2019.

== See also ==
- SURE-P

Military offices
Preceded by Lt Gen AO Ogomudia	Chief of the Army Staff; 2003 – 2006	Succeeded by Lt Gen OA Azazi
Preceded by Alexander Ogomudia	Chief of the Defence Staff; 2007 – 2008	Succeeded by Owoye Andrew Azazi
