= 1st Division (Nigeria) =

Nigerian army division

- Active: 1967–present
- Country: Nigeria
- Type: Mechanized infantry
- Size: Division
- Part of: Nigerian Army
- Garrison/HQ: Kaduna, Nigeria

Commanders
- General Officer Commanding: Major General M.L.D. Saraso

The 1st Division is one of two mechanized infantry division unit of the Nigerian Army (NA), which specialized in combined arms, desert and jungle warfare, maneuver warfare, and reconnaissance. It was established during the Nigerian Civil War and is charged with securing its area of responsibility covering the North Western flank of Nigeria and also ensuring that the borders located in its AOR are secured. The division is a mechanized infantry with affiliated combat support and combat service support units.

== History ==
In August–September 1967, 1 Area Command at Kaduna was predesignated 1 Infantry Division, and 2 Division was formed under Colonel Murtala Mohammed. At the end of the Civil War, the three divisions of the army were reorganized into four divisions, with each controlling territories running from North to South, with each division having access to the sea. This was later abandoned in favor of the assignment of sectors to the divisions.

== Divisional components ==
- Division Headquarters (Kaduna)
  - 1st Mechanised Brigade (Sokoto)
    - 65th Mechanised Battalion
    - 81st Motorised Battalion
    - 223rd Light Battalion
  - 3rd Motorised Brigade (Kano)
    - 5th Motorised Battalion
    - 29th Motorised Battalion
    - 82nd Motorised Battalion
  - 17th Brigade
    - 35th Battalion (Katsina)
    - 171st Battalion (Daura)
  - 31st Artillery Brigade
    - 311th Field Artillery Regiment
    - 312th Field Artillery Regiment
    - 313th Air Defence Regiment
  - 241st Recce Battalion (Nguru)
  - 41st Engineers Brigade
  - 1st Division Signals & Logistics Formations
    - 1st Division Signals Regiment
    - 71st Supply and Transport Brigade
    - 1st Division Ordnance Services & Field Workshop
    - 1st Division Military Hospital

The existence of 3rd Brigade at Kano was corroborated by a May 2015 report of 1,000 soldiers dismissed "for allegedly disobeying orders during onslaughts against Boko Haram militants in the North-east."

17 Brigade began its formation in late 2017, and was officially established on 20 February 2018 for internal security duties. It became part of 1 Division.

== Commanders ==
- Colonel Mohammed Shuwa (August 1967 – September 1969)
- Brigadier I.D. Bisalla (September 1969 – December 1973)
- Brigadier I.B. Haruna (December 1973 – July 1975)
- Major General I.A. Akinrinade (August 1975 – January 1978)
- Brigadier D.Y. Bali (January 1978 – September 1978)
- Brigadier P.A. Eromobor (September 1978 – September 1979)
- Major General G.A. Innih (October 1979 – April 1980)
- Major General D.M. Jemibewon (April 1980 – November 1981)
- Major General A.D. Aduloju (January 1981 – August 1983)
- Major General H.A. Hananiya (August 1983 – January 1984)
- Brigadier J.O. Oni (January 1984 – September 1985)
- Major General P.I. Adomokhai (September 1985 – October 1988)
- Major General M.S. Sami (October 1988 – January 1990)
- Major General I.O.S. Nwachukwu (January 1990 – September 1990)
- Major General A.A. Abubakar (September 1990 – November 1991)
- Brigadier General A.M. Daku (November 1991 – January 1993)
- Brigadier General J.N. Shagaya (January 1993 – September 1993)
- Brigadier General M.C. Alli (September 1993 – December 1993)
- Brigadier General A.J. Kazir (December 1993 – August 1994)
- Brigadier General A.A. Abdullahi (September 1994 – April 1996)
- Major General M.O. Sule (April 1996 – December 1996)
- Major General A.S. Mukhtar (December 1996 – June 1999)
- Major General A.O. Ogomudia (1 July 1999 – April 2001)
- Major General D.R.A. Ndefo (1 May – August 2002)
- Major General S.A. Asemota (August 2002 – January 2005)
- Major General O.A. Azazi (January 2005 – July 2006)
- Major General L.O. Jokotola (July 2006 – 2007)
- Major General M.B. Obi (2007–2008)
- Major General K.A. Role (2008–2010)
- Major General Shoboiki (2010–2012)
- Major General G.A. Wahab (2012–2014)
- Major General K.C. Osuji (2014–2015)
- Major General Adeniyi Oyebade (2015 – 26 October 2017)
- Major General Mohammed Mohammed (26 October 2017 – 11 February 2019)
- Major General Faruk Yahaya (11 February 2019 – 10 April 2020)
- Major General Usman Shehu Mohammed (10 April 2020 – 11 March 2021)
- Major General Himisu Danjuma Ali-Keffi (11 March 2021 – 10 August 2021)
- Major General Kabir Imam Mukhtar (10 August 2021 – 8 August 2022)
- Major General Taoreed Abiodun Lagbaja (8 August 2022 – 14 April 2023)
- Major General Olufemi Akinjobi (14 April 2023 – 3 July 2023)
- Major General Bamidele Alabi (3 July 2023 – 23 August 2023)
- Major General Valentine Okoro (23 August 2023 – 14 March 2024)
- Major General M.L.D. Saraso (14 March 2024 – present)
