= General (Nigeria) =

Highest military rank of the Nigerian Army

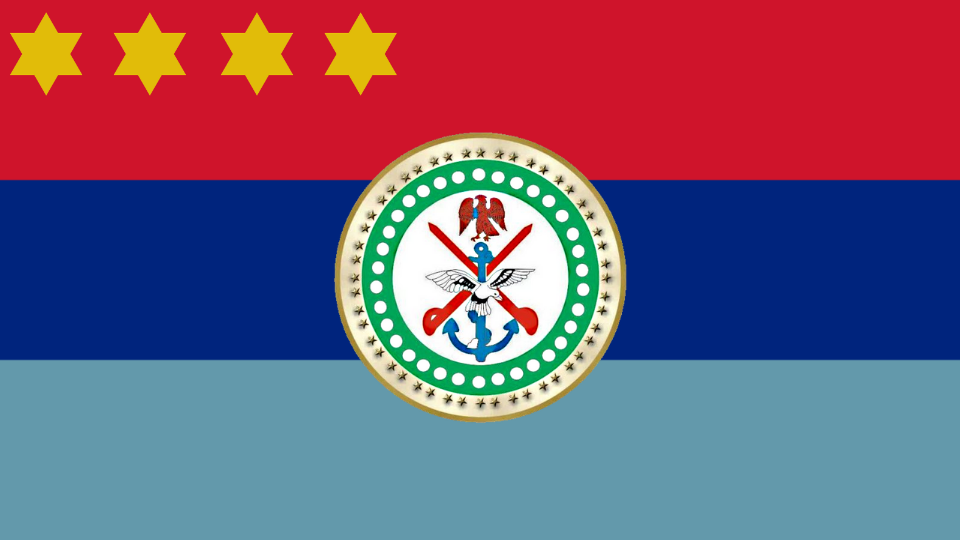
- Flag of a general as CDS

- Rank insignia of a general

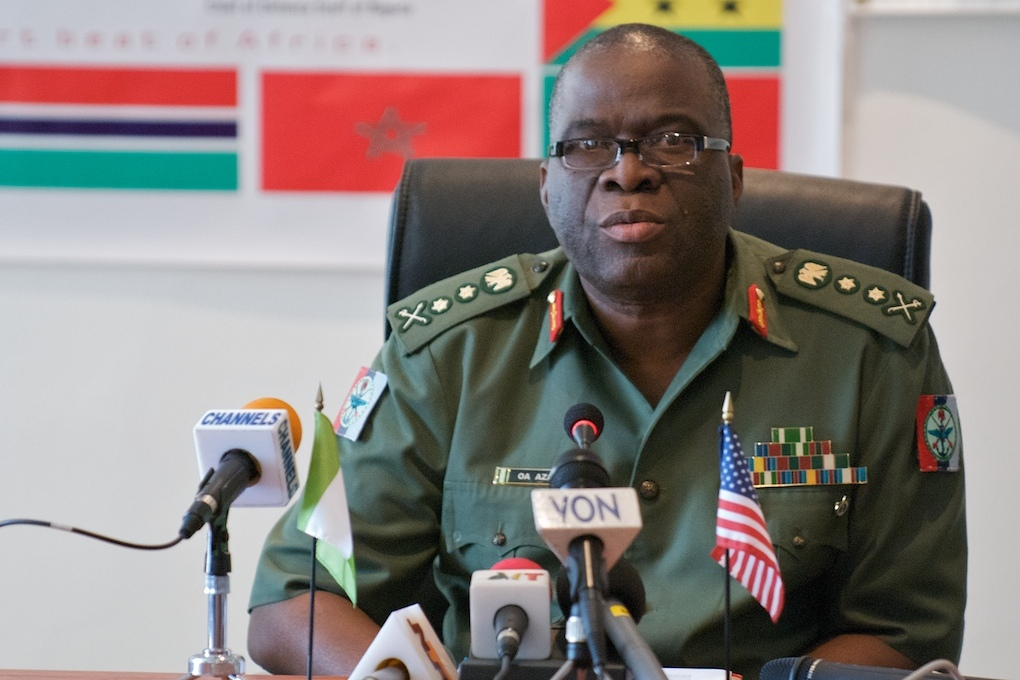
- General Owoye Andrew Azazi wearing the Nigerian General insignia
- Country: Nigeria
- Service branch: Nigerian Army
- Abbreviation: Gen
- Rank group: General officer
- Rank: Four-star rank
- Next higher rank: Field marshal
- Next lower rank: Lieutenant-general
- Equivalent ranks: Admiral (Nigerian Navy); Air chief marshal (Nigerian Air Force)

General (or full general to distinguish it from the lower general officer ranks) is the highest rank achievable by serving officers of the Nigerian Army. It ranks above lieutenant-general and is subordinate to the rank of field marshal, which is only awarded as an honorary rank to the incumbent president of Nigeria in his capacity as the commander-in-chief of the Armed Forces of Nigeria. The rank of general is a four-star rank. It is equivalent to a full admiral in the Nigerian Navy or an air chief marshal in the Nigerian Air Force.

The rank of full general is not always given; this rank is usually held by the Chief of the Defence Staff (if the chief is appointed from the army and not from the navy or the air force).

Officers holding the ranks of lieutenant-general, major-general and brigadier-general may be generically considered to be generals.

== History ==
When the Nigerian Army was formed in 1956, the rank of general was the highest rank defined. Since the formation, the British Army officer heading the army held the rank of Major general and the first Nigerian officer to command the army, Johnson Aguiyi-Ironsi was promoted to the rank of Major general in 1965.

In 1976, then chief of Army Staff, Theophilus Danjuma was promoted to the rank of lieutenant general and ever since then all serving chiefs of the army held the rank of lieutenant general (except on three occasions where the chief held the rank of major general), customarily promoted to the rank on appointment to the post of chief of army staff.

Yakubu Gowon became the first officer to be promoted to the rank of general in 1970 immediately after the Nigerian Civil War. In 1990, Domkat Bali became the first regular officer to be promoted to the rank of general, without serving as the head of state. Since 1990, it became customary for all Chiefs of Defence Staff to be promoted to the rank of general on appointment to the office. In 2021, Lucky Irabor was promoted to the rank after his appointment as the Chief of Defence Staff.

== List of Nigerian Army Generals ==
Since 1960, only fourteen officers have attained this rank. Among them, five attained this rank while they were head of state, one officer Sani Abacha attained this rank before becoming head of state. Ten of them served as Chief of Defence Staff, two heads of state (Sani Abacha and Abdulsalami Abubakar) also served as Chiefs of Defence Staff.

- General Yakubu Gowon
- General Murtala Muhammed
- General Olusegun Obasanjo
- General Ibrahim Babangida
- General Domkat Bali
- General Sani Abacha
- General Abdulsalami Abubakar
- General Alexander Ogomudia
- General Martin Luther Agwai
- General Owoye Andrew Azazi
- General Abayomi Olonisakin
- General Lucky Irabor
- General Christopher Musa
- General Olufemi Oluyede

== Insignia ==
A general's insignia is a crossed sword and baton. Though a brigadier-general does not have this emblem but three stars and an eagle over them, a major-general has an eagle over this emblem; a lieutenant-general an eagle and a star; and a full general two stars and an eagle. The insignia for the highest rank, that of Field Marshal, consists of crossed batons within a wreath and surmounted by an eagle.

== See also ==
- Military ranks of Nigeria
- List of Nigerian Army full generals
