= Defence Minister of Nigeria =

Defence Body

Minister of Defence of Nigeria
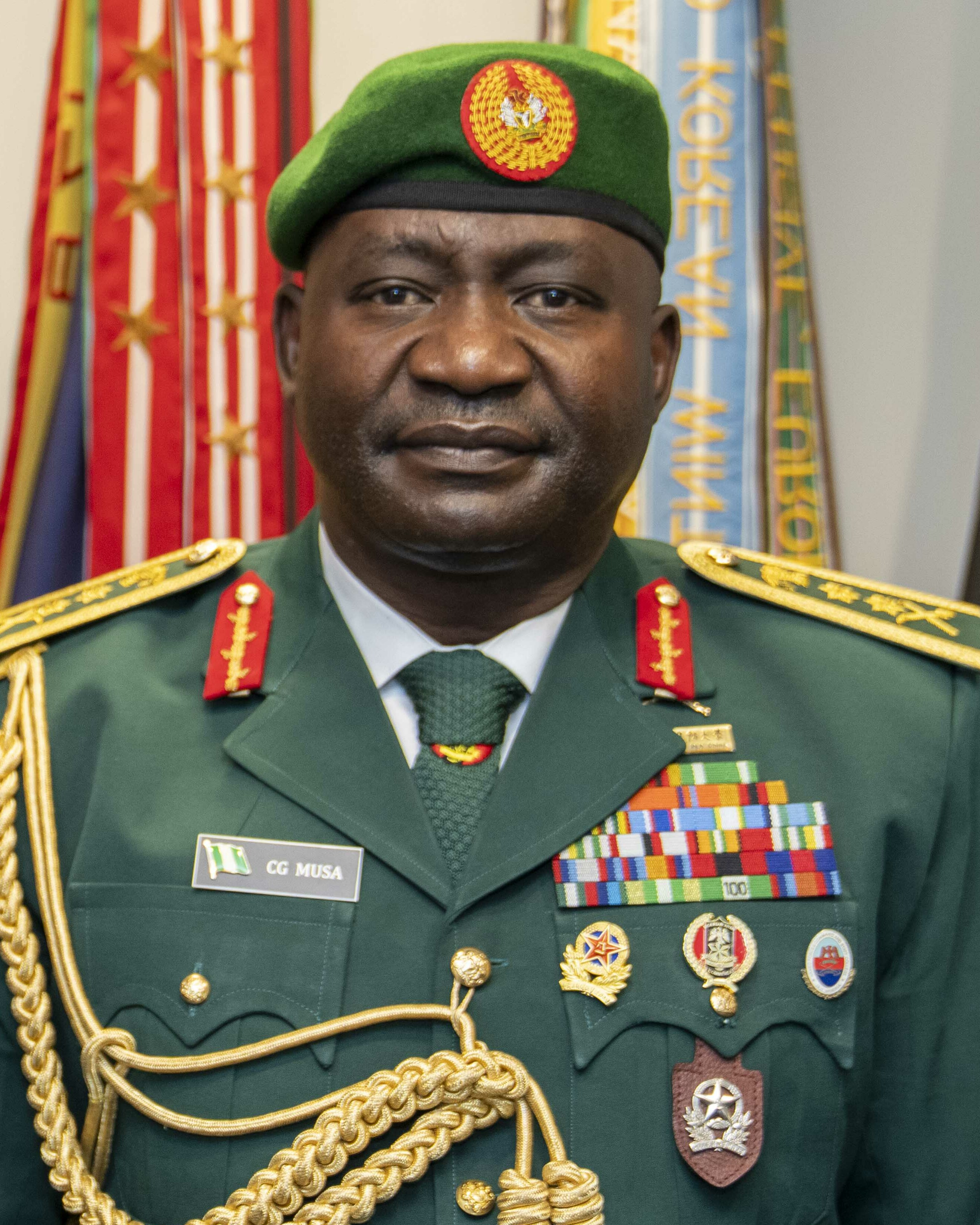
- Incumbent; Christopher Gwabin Musa since 4 December 2025
- Style: The Honourable
- Member of: Federal Executive Council; National Security Council; National Defence Council
- Reports to: President of Nigeria
- Appointer: President of Nigeria; with the legislature's advice and consent
- Term length: No fixed term
- Inaugural holder: Muhammadu Ribadu
- Formation: 1960
- Deputy: Minister of State for Defence

The Federal Minister of Defence of Nigeria is the Federal Executive Council official who leads the Defence Ministry of Nigeria. The Defence Minister's main responsibility is to manage all branches of the Nigerian Armed Forces, to maintain a modern, competent, and professional military force for the protection of the national territory, maritime interests, airspace, and constitution of the Federal Republic of Nigeria.

== List of Ministers ==
=== Minister of Defence (1960-1966) ===
Prime Minister	Name	Term start	Term end
Sir Abubakar Tafawa Balewa	Muhammadu Ribadu	1960	1965
Sir Abubakar Tafawa Balewa	Inuwa Wada	1965	1966

=== Federal Commissioner of Defence (1966-1979) ===
Head of State	Name	Term start	Term end
Himself	Yakubu Gowon	1 August 1966	29 July 1975
Murtala Muhammed	Illiya Bisalla	29 July 1975	13 February 1976
Himself	Olusegun Obasanjo	13 February 1976	1 October 1979

=== Minister of Defence (1979-1983) ===
President	Name	Term start	Term end
Shehu Shagari	Iya Abubakar	24 October 1979	January 1981
Shehu Shagari	Akanbi Oniyangi	January 1981	1983

=== Federal Commissioner of Defence (1983-1999) ===
Head of State	Name	Term start	Term end
Muhammadu Buhari Ibrahim Babangida	Domkat Bali	1984	December 1989
Himself	Ibrahim Babangida	December 1989	August 1990
Ibrahim Babangida Himself	Sani Abacha	September 1990	June 1998
Himself	Abdulsalami Abubakar	June 1998	May 1999

=== Minister of Defence (1999-Present) ===
President	Name	Term start	Term end
Olusegun Obasanjo	Theophilus Danjuma	June 1999	May 2003
Olusegun Obasanjo	Rabiu Kwankwaso	July 2003	May 2007
Umaru Musa Yar'Adua	Yayale Ahmed	26 July 2007	8 September 2008
Umaru Musa Yar'Adua	Shettima Mustapha	17 December 2008	14 July 2009
Umaru Musa Yar'Adua	Godwin Abbe	14 July 2009	17 March 2010
Umaru Musa Yar'Adua Goodluck Jonathan	Adetokunbo Kayode	6 April 2010	30 June 2011
Goodluck Jonathan	Haliru Mohammed Bello	July 2011	22 June 2012
Goodluck Jonathan	Olusola Obada	July 2012	September 2013
Goodluck Jonathan	Labaran Maku (Supervising)	September 2013	March 2014
Goodluck Jonathan	Aliyu Mohammed Gusau	5 March 2014	29 May 2015
Muhammadu Buhari	Mansur Mohammed Dan Ali	11 November 2015	29 May 2019
Muhammadu Buhari	Bashir Salihi Magashi	21 August 2019	29 May 2023
Bola Tinubu	Mohammed Badaru Abubakar	21 August 2023	1 December 2025
Bola Tinubu	Christopher Gwabin Musa	4 December 2025	Present
