= Minister of State for Defence (Nigeria) =

The Minister of State for Defence is a mid-level position in the Ministry of Defence in the Nigerian government. It serves as the deputy to the Defence Minister of Nigeria.

== List ==
- Dupe Adelaja (June 1999 – March 2002)
- Roland Oritsejafor (2003 – 30 August 2006)
- Thomas Aguiyi-Ironsi (30 August 2006 – 2007)
- Murtala Shehu Yar’Adua (2009 – July 2011)
- Olusola Obada (July 2011 – July 2012)
- Musiliu Obanikoro (2014 – October 2014)
- Bello Matawalle (21 August 2023 – Present)

== See also ==
- Minister of State for Defence
