= Owoye Andrew Azazi =

11th Chief of Defence Staff of Nigeria (1952–2012)

General Owoye Andrew Azazi CFR FSS GSS DSS MSS CMH
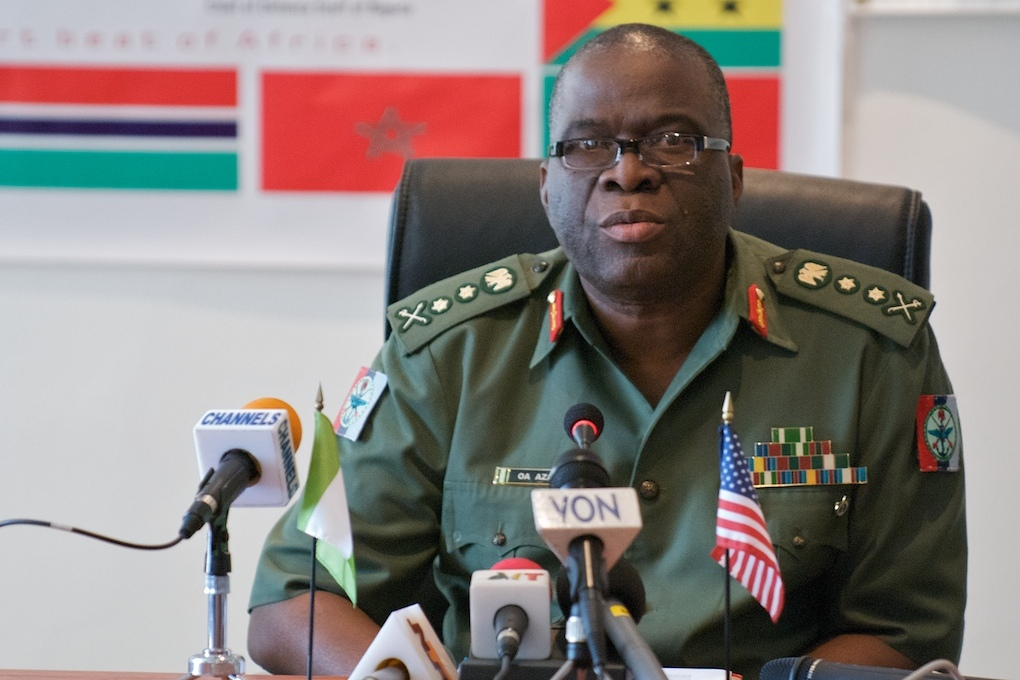
- Owoye Azazi in 2008

Nigerian National Security Adviser
- In office 4 October 2010 – 22 June 2012
- President: Goodluck Jonathan
- Preceded by: Kayode Are
- Succeeded by: Sambo Dasuki

Chief of Defence Staff
- In office 25 May 2007 – 20 August 2008
- Preceded by: Martin Luther Agwai
- Succeeded by: Paul Dike

Chief of Army Staff
- In office June 2006 – May 2007
- Preceded by: Martin Luther Agwai
- Succeeded by: Luka Yusuf

Personal details
- Born: 1 February 1952 Bayelsa State, Nigeria
- Died: 15 December 2012 (aged 60) Okoroba, Bayelsa State, Nigeria
- Education: Nigerian Defence Academy

Military service
- Allegiance: Nigeria
- Branch/service: Nigerian Army
- Years of service: 1972–2008
- Rank: General

Owoye Andrew Azazi CFR FSS GSS DSS MSS CMH (1 February 1952 – 15 December 2012) was a Nigerian army general who served as National Security Adviser to President Goodluck Jonathan, was Chief of Defence Staff (CDS) of Nigeria, and Chief of Army Staff (COAS). Before his first service chief appointment (COAS), he was General Officer Commanding (GOC) 1 Division, Kaduna State.

== Early life ==
Azazi was born at Peretorugbene in present Bayelsa State on 1 February 1952. He had his early education in old Bendel State of Nigeria where he attended Government College Bomadi and graduated in the class of 1968, after which he joined the Nigerian Defence Academy Regular Combatant Cadet Course 12 in July 1972.

== Military career ==
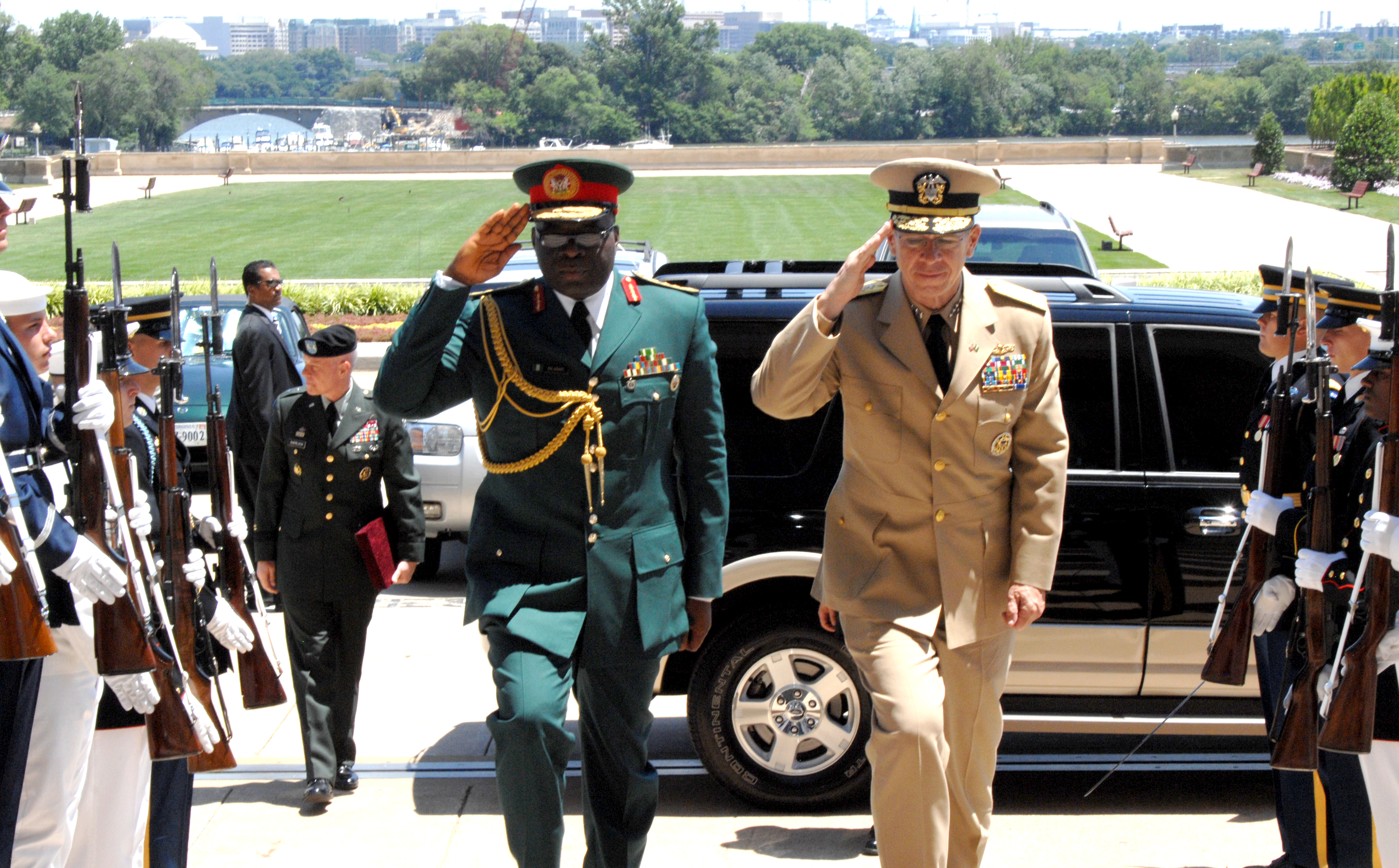
Chairman of the Joint Chiefs of Staff Navy Adm. Mike Mullen, right, and Gen. Owoye Andrew Azazi, Chief of Defense Staff for the Federal Republic of Nigeria, walk through an honor cordon into the Pentagon 24 June 2008 to attend a meeting.

Azazi was commissioned 2nd Lieutenant on 14 December 1974. At the end of the combined training he won the bronze medal for being first in Art subjects. He has served as a Brigade Intelligence Officer, Divisional Intelligence Officer and Colonel Coordination, Headquarters Directorate of Military Intelligence. He was assistant Defence Attaché at the Embassy of Nigeria, Washington DC, United States for three years. He served as a member of the Directing Staff of the Command and Staff College from where he was posted to Lagos Garrison Command as the Intelligence Officer and subsequently to the Directorate of Military Intelligence as Colonel Coordination. He was later posted to the Training and Doctrine Command as Colonel Research and Development and then Director of Training.

On graduation from War College, he was appointed Colonel General Staff, 81 Division of the Nigerian Army and later Deputy Chief of Defence Intelligence, Defence Intelligence Agency. General Azazi also served as a member of Directing Staff of the National War College Abuja, rising later to become its Principal Staff Officer Coordination. He was appointed Director of Military Intelligence in 2003. He was appointed Chairman of the Committee of Nigerian Army in the Next Decade in May 2004. He was appointed the General Officer Commanding (GOC) 1 Division, Nigerian Army in January 2005, and subsequently appointed Chief of Army Staff in June 2006.

He was an external examiner at the National War College and a Guest Lecturer on Military Operations Other Than War and Revolution in Military Affairs. General Azazi was a member of Nigeria's Defence Policy Review Committee 2000/2001. Azazi had for some time had one of the fastest growing military careers in the history of present-day democratic Nigeria, between May, 2006 and June, 2007 the General had worn the ranks of Major General, Lieutenant General and General.

General Azazi held an MSc in Strategic Studies from the University of Ibadan, and completed the Staff Intelligence and Security Course, School of Service Intelligence, Ashford, Kent, United Kingdom and Combined Strategic Intelligence Training Programme, Defence Intelligence College, Washington DC, United States. He is a graduate of the Armed Forces Command and Staff College Nigeria, and the National War College, Nigeria where he won the President and Commander-in-Chief's merit award for best all round performance.

On 20 August 2008 Umaru Yar'Adua replaced Azazi with Paul Dike as CDS and announced Azazi's retirement from military service.

== National Security Adviser ==
Azazi emerged from retirement to assume the National Security Adviser (NSA) post as a civilian. He inherited a range of challenges from extremists, including the militant Movement for the Emancipation of the Niger Delta (MEND) in his native region, and the rise of a new violent Islamist group called Boko Haram, which first emerged in 2009.

Shortly after taking office, Azazi presided over the interception and public exposure of a large illegal shipment of weapons from the Islamic Republic of Iran. He did not speculate publicly on the origin of the weapons, and left it up to the Foreign Ministry to make the official allegation before the United Nations. News accounts differ as to the destination of the arms, with Israeli reports saying they were headed for Gaza, and others, including Nigerian government sources, saying they were to be smuggled elsewhere in West Africa, including to rebels based in Senegal and the Gambia. Nigerian officials arrested an Iranian national reported to be a senior officer with the Qods Force of Iran's Revolutionary Guard and placed him on trial. The Iranian government called the shipments a "misunderstanding."

As National Security Adviser, Azazi worked with other countries, notably African neighbors, European countries and the United States, toward developing a new security and counterterrorism strategy. In the autumn of 2010, he met with then-CIA Director Leon Panetta at CIA headquarters in Langley, Virginia. In August 2011, Azazi held meetings with US AFRICOM Commander Gen. Carter F. Ham about American training and sharing intelligence to combat Boko Haram and Niger Delta extremists. He attended a CIA event in California in November. On Christmas Day, 2011, the White House confirmed that U.S. officials had been in communication with top Nigerian officials to combat terrorism.

Azazi took a systematic approach to the reform of Nigeria's security and intelligence apparatus, with a low-key demeanor that some critics termed as indifference. He was quoted as having said in effect that real reform comes with human development of national security personnel and officials and greater citizen participation, and not with mere documents, statements, and bureaucratic or leadership rearrangements.

The few public statements Azazi made as the national security advisor on terrorism matters tended to be cautious and nuanced. Azazi appeared to prefer allowing the Foreign Ministry and judicial system to make definitive statements to the public, which led some critics to allege that he had not been attentive to counterterrorism matters.

In contrast to his public persona, Azazi was reported to be aggressive behind the scenes. Nigeria's State Security Service (SSS), which reports to Azazi, took what observers consider an unusual step in November 2011 by arresting a federal senator and charging him with aiding Boko Haram. That senator, Mohammed Ali Ndume, had switched political affiliations to become a member of President Jonathan's own party. After Senator Ndume's arrest, a federal court in December 2011 ordered the politician jailed in expectation of a trial in 2012.

Azazi appeared to be studying extremist threat doctrine in his shaping of a national response to Islamist extremism. Islam in Nigeria takes many forms, and Azazi sought to differentiate among them. After the Christmas 2011 Boko Haram bombings of churches, Azazi strongly cautioned fellow Christians against talk of retaliation against Muslims or even wider religious warfare. He called on citizens to question the strategic intentions of the perpetrators, and said that counterterrorism policy must address those strategic intentions.

Discussing Boko Haram and its strategy to incite retaliatory sectarian violence, Azazi said, "Have we thought of what their ultimate intentions are? Why will somebody go on to bomb Christians on a Christmas Day? Look at the ultimate intentions. Do they want to really raise tempers elsewhere?" Boko Haram terms Nigeria an "enemy of Islam" and seeks the disintegration of Nigeria as a country.

Rather than pursue counterterrorism solutions that would require mass policing of the country, Azazi stressed public participation in monitoring extremism and in assisting the security services.

In January 2012, Azazi praised the bipartisan findings of a homeland security subcommittee of the U.S. Congress that characterized Boko Haram as a threat to him and the "U.S. The subcommittee report urged stronger U.S. intelligence and counterterrorism ties with Nigeria. Azazi publicly voiced support for a strategic security relationship with the United States in an essay he authored for The Washington Times.

== Personal life and death ==
Azazi was married with children. His hobbies included reading biographies, Nigerian music and playing squash.

On 15 December 2012 Azazi died along with Governor Patrick Yakowa of Kaduna state in a naval helicopter crash in Okoroba Village of Bayelsa State while on their way back to the Port-Harcourt Airport from the funeral of Oronto Douglas's father.

== Honors and Military Decorations ==
- Commander of the Order of the Federal Republic (CFR)
- Grand Service Star (GSS)
- Distinguished Service Star (DSS)
- Meritorious Service Star (MSS)
- Force Service Star (FSS)
- Corps Medal of Honour (CMH)
- Pass Staff Course Dagger (PSC+)
- National Defence College Dagger (NDC+)
- President and Commander in Chief's Merit Award

== Lectures and participations ==
His recent seminar and conference highlights include:

- Keynote speaker at the Africa Center for Strategic Studies, National Defence University, Washington DC, January 2009
- Addressed a Seminar at the Africa Center for Strategic Studies, National Defence University, Washington DC, September 2008 on Defense Transformation in Africa.
- Participant at the Forum on African Exit Strategies, Institute for Higher National Defence Studies (IHEDN), Paris, June 2004
- Member Curriculum Review Workshop for Senior Leadership Seminar on the Africa Centre for Strategic Studies/National Defence University, USA
- Facilitator, Seminar on Energy and Security in Africa March 2005
- Participant in the OECD/DAC Workshop on Security System Reforms held in Ghana in December 2005

He was a guest lecturer at the Department of Psychology of the Post-Graduate School, University of Ibadan and the Friedrich Ebert Siftung Institute Sensitization Training Workshop for Experts and Personnel in the Security Sector in West Africa. He was also a Guest Lecturer on the Span of Command and Leadership at the National Defense College, Abuja, Nigeria.

== Notes ==
Military offices
Preceded by M. L. Agwai	Chief of the Army Staff; 2006 – 2007	Succeeded by Luka Yusuf
Preceded by M. L. Agwai	Chief of the Defence Staff; 2007 – 2008	Succeeded by Paul Dike
