= Domkat Bali =

Nigerian general and politician (1940–2020)

General Domkat Bali

Minister of Defence
- In office 1 January 1984 – December 1989
- Preceded by: Akanbi Oniyangi
- Succeeded by: Ibrahim Babangida

Chief of Defence Staff
- In office 1 January 1984 – December 1989
- Preceded by: Gibson Jalo
- Succeeded by: Sani Abacha

General Officer Commanding 81 Division, Lagos
- In office January 1978 – December 1979
- Preceded by: Brig. M.I. Wushishi
- Succeeded by: Brig. M. Buhari

Personal details
- Born: Domkat Yah Bali; 27 February 1940 Langtang, Northern Region, British Nigeria (now in Plateau State, Nigeria)
- Died: 4 December 2020 (aged 80)
- Education: Nigerian Military Training College; Royal Military Academy Sandhurst

Military service
- Allegiance: Nigeria
- Branch/service: Nigerian Army
- Years of service: 1961–1990
- Rank: General

Domkat Yah Bali (27 February 1940 – 4 December 2020) was a Nigerian army four-star general, who was Minister of Defence and Chief of Defence Staff from 1984 to 1990, and a member of the Supreme Military Council of 1984–1985, and the Armed Forces Ruling Council of 1985–1990.

== Early life and education ==
Bali was born in Langtang, Plateau State to the family of Hassan Bali Tabut and Yinkat Bali. He had his primary education at Mban, Langtang and from 1955 to 1960, attended the provincial secondary school at Kuru.

He attended Nigerian Military Training College from April to August 1961. From December 1961 to December 1963, he attended the Royal Military Academy, Sandhurst, earning his commission as a lieutenant in 1964.

== Career ==
Bali became captain a year later in 1965. In 1966, he was battery commander and during the Nigerian Civil War, he was a regimental commander. He was made major in 1968. Between 1970 and 1971, Bali was commander, Corps of Artillery and later became a colonel at the Second Infantry Division in Ibadan. In 1973, he was posted to Akure as the commander of the 9th Infantry Brigade, he was adjutant general Nigerian army in 1975, commander Corps of Artillery in 1976 and in 1978, he was the GOC of the First Infantry Division, Kaduna. Prior to becoming Defense Minister in 1984, he was Commandant of the Nigerian Armed Forces Command and Staff College from 1981 to 1983 and later director of army training and operations.

He resigned from public service in January 1990. He was the Chairman of HFP Engineering, builders of Victoria Garden City, Lagos Nigeria.

In December 2010, he was selected by the Tarok kingmakers headed by the Madakin Langtang, HRH Daniel Lamda Bongtur to succeed the Lt. Hrm. Edward Cirdap Zhattau (oon.) as the Ponzhi Tarok, the paramount ruler of the Tarok people of plateau state. He was married to Esther Bali an educationist and they have two children, Nanna and Ponfa.

== Death ==
Bali died on 4 December 2020.
