= Abayomi Olonisakin =

16th Chief of Defence Staff of Nigeria (born 1961)

General Abayomi Olonisakin CFR psc(+) GSS CMH fwc
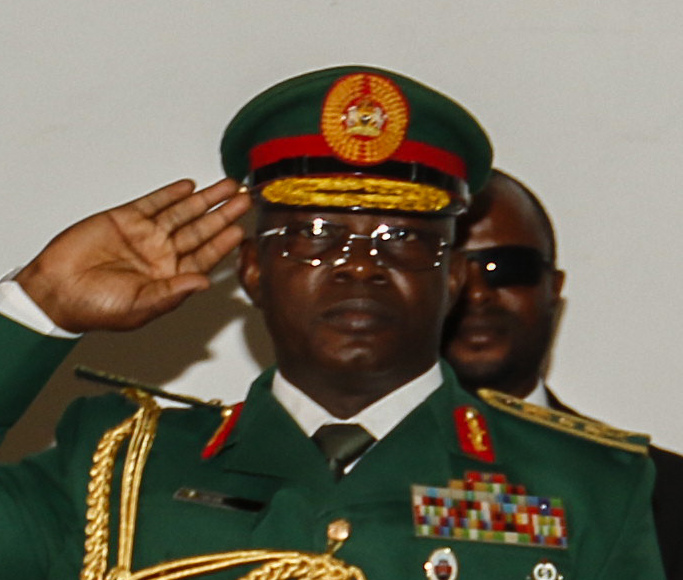
- Olonisakin in 2018

Chief of Defence Staff
- In office 21 July 2015 – 29 January 2021
- Preceded by: Alex Sabundu Badeh
- Succeeded by: Lucky Irabor

Commander of TRADOC
- In office September 2013 – July 2015
- Preceded by: Salihu Zaway Uba
- Succeeded by: Mobolaji Koleoso

Commander of the Nigerian Army Corps of Signals
- In office January 2013 – September 2013

Personal details
- Born: 2 December 1961 (age 64) Ekiti state, Nigeria
- Education: Nigeria Military School; Nigerian Defence Academy; Obafemi Awolowo University

Military service
- Allegiance: Nigeria
- Branch/service: Nigerian Army
- Years of service: 1979 – 2021
- Rank: General
- Commands: Chief of Defence Staff; Commander of TRADOC; Commander of the Army Corps of Signals

Abayomi Gabriel Olonisakin CFR psc(+) GSS CMH fwc (born 2 December 1961) is a retired Nigerian Army general, former Chief of Defence Staff, and current Nigerian Ambassador to the Republic of Cameroon. He was appointed to the position of Chief of Defence Staff on 13 July 2015 by President Muhammadu Buhari. He resigned from office on 29 January 2021.

== Early life and education ==
General Olonisakin who hails from Ekiti State and had his elementary and secondary education in Zaria. The third of five children, Olonisakin grew up in the Odo Ijebu Quarters of Ode Ekiti, Gbonyin local government area, Ekiti State, where his parents were active member of the local CMS church. He enrolled at the Nigerian Military School, Zaria in 1973 and later joined the Nigerian Defence Academy as a member of the 25th Regular Combatant Course. He was commissioned as a 2nd Lieutenant into the Nigerian Army Signal Corps in 1981. Olonisakin holds a Bachelor of Science degree with honours in Electrical and Electronics Engineering from Obafemi Awolowo University in Ife.

== Career ==
Prior to his appointment as Chief of Defence Staff, General Olonisakin was commander of the following formations

- TRADOC
- Nigerian Army Corps of Signals

Olonisakin was promoted to General in August 2015 by President Muhammadu Buhari upon his confirmation as Chief of Defence Staff.

== Awards ==
In October 2022, a Nigerian national honour of Commander of the Order of the Federal Republic (CFR) was conferred on him by then President Muhammadu Buhari.
