= Lucky Irabor =

17th Chief of Defence Staff of Nigeria (born 1965)

General Lucky Irabor CFR psc NAM GSS ndc FCMH

Chief of Defence Staff
- In office 29 January 2021 – 23 June 2023
- President: Muhammadu Buhari; Bola Tinubu
- Preceded by: Abayomi Olonisakin
- Succeeded by: Christopher Musa

Commander of TRADOC
- In office July 2020 – January 2021
- Preceded by: Abubakar Tarfa
- Succeeded by: Stevenson Olabanji

Commander of the Multinational Joint Task Force
- In office May 2017 – August 2018
- Preceded by: Lamidi Adeosun
- Succeeded by: Chikezie Ude

Commander of Operation Lafiya Dole
- In office March 2016 – May 2017
- Preceded by: Hassan Umaru
- Succeeded by: Ibrahim Attahiru

Personal details
- Born: 5 October 1965 (age 60) Agbor, Mid-Western Region, Nigeria (now in Delta State)

Military service
- Allegiance: Nigeria
- Branch/service: Nigerian Army
- Years of service: 1983–2023
- Rank: General

Lucky Eluonye Onyenuchea Irabor CFR psc NAM GSS ndc FCMH (born 5 October 1965) is a retired Nigerian army general and a former Chief of Defence Staff of Nigeria. He was appointed by Muhammadu Buhari on 26 January 2021.

== Background ==
Irabor was born on 5 October 1965 in Aliokpu Agbor, Ika South Local Government Area of Delta State, Nigeria. He gained admission into the Nigerian Defence Academy (NDA) Kaduna as a member of the 34 Regular Course in 1983 and was commissioned Second Lieutenant on 28 June 1986 into the Signals Corps of the Nigerian Army.

Irabor attended military and civil courses both locally and abroad. He attended Armed Forces Command and Staff College, Jaji (AFCSC) for his Junior Staff Course in 1995 and Ghana Armed Forces Staff College, Teshi, Accra, Ghana for Senior Staff Course in 2000/2001 amongst others. He equally attended the National Defence College in Bangladesh in 2010 and Harvard Kennedy Schools of Government and Executive Education, the US in 2012 and 2017 respectively. Irabor obtained a bachelor's degree in engineering from Obafemi Awolowo University and holds two master's degrees from University of Ghana and Bangladesh University of Professionals, Dhaka.

== Early life and education ==
General Irabor was raised in a military family and had his early education at the Nigerian Military School, Zaria. He later attended the Nigerian Defence Academy, Kaduna, where he graduated with a bachelor's degree in Electrical Engineering in 1983.

== Awards ==
In October 2022, a Nigerian national honour of Commander of the Order of the Federal Republic (CFR) was conferred on him by President Muhammadu Buhari.
