= Alexander Ogomudia =

9th Chief of Defence Staff of Nigeria (born 1949)

General Alexander Ogomudia CFR DSS fwc psc(+) MSc FNSE

Chief of Defence Staff
- In office 27 June 2003 – 1 June 2006
- Preceded by: Adm. I. Ogohi
- Succeeded by: Gen. M.L. Agwai

Chief of Army Staff
- In office April 2001 – June 2003
- Preceded by: Lt-Gen. S. V. L. Malu
- Succeeded by: Lt-Gen. M. L. Agwai

General Officer Commanding 1 Division Nigerian Army
- In office 1 July 1999 – April 2001
- Preceded by: Maj-Gen A.S. Mukhtar
- Succeeded by: Maj-Gen D.R.A. Ndefo

Personal details
- Born: 29 December 1949 (age 76) Uzere, Southern Region, British Nigeria (now in Delta State, Nigeria)
- Education: Nigerian Defence Academy; Obafemi Awolowo University; University of Ibadan

Military service
- Allegiance: Nigeria
- Branch/service: Nigerian Army
- Years of service: 1969–2006
- Rank: General

Alexander Odeareduo Ogomudia CFR DSS fwc psc(+) MSc FNSE (born 29 December 1949) is a retired Nigerian army general who served as Chief of Defence Staff of Nigeria from 2003 to 2006 and Chief of Army Staff from 2001 to 2003.

== Biography ==
The Nigerian Army officially described the four star Service Chief as "General" Alexander Odeareduo Ogomudia who was born on 29 December 1949, at Uzere in Isoko South Local Government Area in Delta State of Nigeria. After his Primary and Secondary Education he opted to serve in the military. He joined the Nigerian Defence Academy (NDA) as a cadet on 13 October 1969. At the successful completion of his cadet training, he was commissioned on 11 March 1972 into the Nigerian Army Signal in the rank of Second Lieutenant with effect from 13 October 1969. He is of NDA 7th Regular Course. Second Lieutenant AO Ogomudia's first point of duty after commission was General Staff Officer Grade 3 Operation/Training where he served as Staff Officer from April 1972 to December 1972. He was promoted Lieutenant on 11 June 1972."

"Between the rank of Lieutenant and Major, which spanned from 11 June 1972 to 11 June 1981, AO Ogomudia attended a number of military and civil Courses, at home and abroad. He attended Signal Officers Basic Course (SOBC 19) USA, Signals Officers' Degree Engineer Course (India), Diploma Electrical Electronics Engineering, Obafemi Awolowo University Ile-Ife, Battalion Commanders' Course Jaji, National War College Course Lagos and University of Ibadan amongst others. During the same period, General Ogomudia held various appointments. They include Adjutant, Communication Zone Signal Regiment, Commanding Officer Signal Support Regiment, Directing Staff Command and Staff College, Commander 53 Armoured Division Headquarters and Signal [Regiment?], Director of Telecommunications Headquarters Nigerian Army Signals, Colonel Co-ordination Headquarters Nigerian Army Signal, Deputy Commandant, Nigerian Army Signal and School (Training Branch), Directing Staff, National War College, Commandant Nigerian Army Signals and School and General Officer Commanding 1 Mechanized Division Nigerian Army."

"AO Ogomudia rose to the Rank of Lieutenant Colonel on 11 December 1985 and on 11 December 1990, he was promoted to the rank of Colonel. He was promoted Brigadier General on 11 December 1994 and then Major General 11 December 1998. He was subsequently elevated to the rank of Lieutenant General on 1 October 2001. Lieutenant General AO Ogomudia then a Major General was appointed Chief of Army Staff Nigerian Army (COAS) on 1 April 2001. He is married with children. His hobbies include Music, Farming and Engineering Designs."

Ogomudia served as Chief of the Defence Staff of Nigeria from 2003 to 2006. He succeeded Ibrahim Ogohi, and was succeeded by Martin Luther Agwai.
