= Sani Abacha =

Military head of state of Nigeria from 1993 to 1998

General Sani Abacha GCFR
- Portrait, c. 1993–1998

10th Head of State of Nigeria
- In office 17 November 1993 – 8 June 1998
- Chief of General Staff: Oladipo Diya
- Preceded by: Ernest Shonekan
- Succeeded by: Abdulsalami Abubakar

Minister of Defence
- In office August 1990 – 8 June 1998
- President: Ibrahim Babangida; Ernest Shonekan; Himself
- Preceded by: Domkat Bali
- Succeeded by: Abdulsalami Abubakar

Chief of Defence Staff
- In office August 1990 – 17 November 1993
- President: Ibrahim Babangida; Ernest Shonekan
- Preceded by: Domkat Bali
- Succeeded by: Oladipo Diya

Chief of Army Staff
- In office August 1985 – August 1990
- President: Ibrahim Babangida
- Preceded by: Ibrahim Babangida
- Succeeded by: Salihu Ibrahim

Personal details
- Born: 20 September 1943 Kano, Northern Region, British Nigeria (now Kano, Kano, Nigeria)
- Died: 8 June 1998 (aged 54) Aso Villa, Abuja, Nigeria
- Spouse: Maryam Abacha
- Children: See: Ibrahim Mohammed Abba Mahmud Sadiq Zainab Fatima Gumsu Rakiya Abdullahi Mustapha
- Occupation: Military officer

Military service
- Allegiance: Nigeria
- Branch/service: Nigerian Army
- Years of service: 1963–1998
- Rank: General
- Battles/wars: Nigerian Civil War; First Liberian Civil War

Sani Abacha ( 20 September 1943 – 8 June 1998) was a Nigerian military dictator and statesman who ruled Nigeria as military head of state from 1993, following a palace coup d'état, until his death in 1998.

Abacha's seizure of power was the last successful coup d'état in Nigerian military history. He wielded power with an unyielding attitude and his rule heralded an unprecedented total disregard for human rights with several political assassinations and summary executions of dissidents and political opponents in Nigeria. His rule drew disrepute to the country with Nigeria becoming a pariah state in international relations particularly with regard to the execution of environmental activist Ken Saro-Wiwa.

Sani Abacha was considered one of the twentieth century's most corrupt dictators and as a kleptocrat for the alleged embezzlement of US$2–5 billion. Abacha, and his family, allegedly hid most of the loot in Switzerland, as well as in other jurisdictions including Liechtenstein, the United Kingdom and the United States. Abacha's death on 8 June 1998 brought about the Nigerian Fourth Republic a year later and he was succeeded as Nigeria's head of state by General Abdulsalami Abubakar.

== Early life ==
A professed Muslim, Sani Abacha was born and brought up in Kano to a Kanuri family originally from present-day Borno State. He attended the Nigerian Military Training College in Kaduna 1962, and was commissioned in 1963 after he had attended the Mons Officer Cadet School in Aldershot, England.

== Military career ==
Abacha was definitely involved in all the military coups in Nigeria since July 1966 during his military career. In 1966, when he was still a second lieutenant with the 3rd Battalion in Kaduna, he took part in the July 1966 Nigerian counter-coup from the conceptual stage. He could well have been a participant in the Lagos or Abeokuta phases of the coup the previous January as well. In 1969, he fought during the Nigerian Civil War as a platoon and battalion commander. He later became commander of the 2nd Infantry Division in 1975. In 1983, Abacha was general officer commanding of the 2nd Mechanised Division, and was appointed a member of the Supreme Military Council.

In the same year, Abacha played a prominent role in the 1983 Nigerian coup d'état which brought General Muhammadu Buhari to power; and the 1985 Nigerian coup d'état which removed Buhari and brought General Ibrahim Babangida to power. When General Ibrahim Babangida was named President and Commander-in-Chief of the Armed Forces of the Federal Republic of Nigeria in 1985, Abacha was named Chief of Army Staff. He was later appointed Minister of Defence in 1990.

Abacha served as Chief of Army Staff from 1985 to 1990, as Chief of Defence Staff from 1990 to 1993, and as Minister of Defence. Abacha is noted for having been the first Nigerian Army officer to attain the rank of general without skipping a single rank.

== Seizure of power ==
Abacha was the defence minister and most senior official within the military hierarchy during the crisis of the Third Republic. He orchestrated the coup d'état of 1993 which overthrew the Interim National Government of Ernest Shonekan. In his nationwide broadcast, Abacha portrayed the overthrow as an act of stability brought about through the socio-political uncertainties caused by the 1993 presidential election.

== Head of state ==
Abacha ruled as Head of State and Commander-in-Chief of the Armed Forces of the Federal Republic of Nigeria from 1993 to 1998. In September 1994, he issued a decree that placed his government above the jurisdiction of the courts effectively giving him absolute power. Another decree gave him the right to detain anyone for up to three months without trial. He further abrogated Decree 691 of 1993.

=== Establishment of the National Human Rights Commission ===
In late 1995, amid compounding international isolation and severe domestic criticism over his administration's human rights abuses—notably preceding the execution of environmental activist Ken Saro-Wiwa—Abacha signed Decree No. 22 of October 6, 1995, which established the Nigerian National Human Rights Commission (NHRC).

The creation of the commission coincided with the announcement of a new military-to-civilian transition program and was primarily intended to align with United Nations General Assembly Resolution 48/134. However, human rights organizations noted that under the original 1995 decree, the commission lacked genuine autonomy; the military head of state retained absolute executive authority to appoint or dismiss its board members, heavily restricting its capacity to independently investigate government-sponsored violations during his tenure.

=== Regime maintenance ===
Abacha assembled a personal security force of 3,000 men trained in North Korea. Abacha's chief security officer Hamza al-Mustapha had an iron grip on the apparatus of military security. The Nigeria Police Force underwent a large-scale retraining. The state cracked down ruthlessly on criminals and dissidents, the National Democratic Coalition was charged with responsibility for a number of bombings across the country, and several of its members were arrested. When Moshood Abiola proclaimed himself president, he was jailed for treason and subsequently died in custody. Also, former military ruler Olusegun Obasanjo was jailed for treason and accused of plotting a coup together with General Oladipo Diya. In 1997, General Shehu Yar'Adua who was also jailed died in custody. Abacha's regime was accused of human rights abuses, especially after the hanging of Ogoni activist Ken Saro-Wiwa (only one of several executions of Ogoni activists opposed to the exploitation of Nigerian resources by the multinational petroleum company, Royal Dutch Shell), whose death later led to the eviction of Nigeria from the Commonwealth of Nations. Wole Soyinka was charged in absentia with treason. Abacha's regime suffered opposition externally by pro-democracy activists.

=== National economy ===
Though Abacha's administration was touted as being deeply corrupt, it oversaw an increase in the country's foreign exchange reserves from $494 million in 1993 to $9.6 billion by the middle of 1997, and reduced the external debt of Nigeria from $36 billion in 1993 to $27 billion by 1997. Abacha also constructed between 25 and 100 km of urban road in major cities such as Kano, Gusau, Benin, Funtua, Zaria, Enugu, Kaduna, Aba, Lagos, Lokoja and Port Harcourt. Abacha brought the privatisation programs of the Ibrahim Babangida administration to a halt, reduced an inflation rate of 54% inherited from Ernest Shonekan to 8.5% between 1993 and 1998, all while the nation's primary commodity, oil was at an average price of $15 per barrel. GDP growth, despite being estimated to be higher than the 2.2% growth in 1995, was largely limited to the petroleum sector. Sani Abacha advocated for a market economy.

=== Embezzlement of state funds ===
The unprecedented economic achievements coincided with the rapid expansion of embezzlement hitherto unseen in the history of corruption in Nigeria in the alleged saga known as "Abacha loot". Abacha's national security adviser, Alhaji Ismaila Gwarzo, was accused by the government of President Olusegun Obasanjo to have played a central role in the looting and transfer of money to overseas accounts. Abacha's son, Mohammed Abacha and best friend Alhaji Mohammed M. Sada were also involved. A preliminary report published by the Abdulsalam Abubakar transitional government in November 1998 described the process. The report mentioned that Sani Abacha told Ismaila Gwarzo to provide fake national security funding requests, which Abacha approved. The funds were usually sent in cash or traveller's cheques by the Central Bank of Nigeria to Gwarzo, who took them to Abacha's house. Mohammed Sada then arranged to launder the money to offshore accounts. An estimated $1.4 billion in cash was delivered in this way.

In 2004, a list of the ten most self-enriching leaders in the previous two decades was released; in order of amount allegedly stolen, the fourth-ranked of these leaders was Abacha and his family who are alleged to have embezzled between $1 billion – $5 billion. In 2002, rumours circulated that Abacha's family purportedly agreed to return $1.2 billion. Sources in the Obasanjo administration disclosed that the whole Abacha loot was politicised by the administration for his re-election bid. On 7 August 2014, the United States Department of Justice announced the forfeiture of US$480 million, the largest in its history, to the Nigerian government. Jersey discovered more than $267 million in funds that were allegedly laundered through the U.S. banking system and deposited in a Jersey account (£210m in British pounds). In 2019, more than 20 years after his death the U.S. Justice Department, Jersey courts and the government of Nigeria completed a civil asset forfeiture against the funds and they will be divided between those countries.

=== 1994–1995 Constitutional Conference and Geopolitical Zoning ===
During the 1994–1995 National Constitutional Conference (NCC) convened by the military regime of General Sani Abacha, Ekwueme served on the Committee on the Structure and Framework of the Constitution. At the conference, he introduced a structural proposal to divide Nigeria into six administrative geopolitical zones: North-Central, North-East, North-West, South-East, South-South, and South-West. This framework was designed to correct systemic regional imbalances, mitigate minority marginalization, and move national political dialogue away from the historical, polarizing dominance of the three large ethnic-regional blocs (North, East, and West).

Ekwueme's original blueprint was tethered to a comprehensive power-sharing arrangement. He proposed a single, non-renewable five-year presidential term rotating across the regions, accompanied by six concurrent Vice Presidents—one representing each geopolitical zone. Under this model, if a sitting president died, resigned, or was removed, the Vice President from that specific president's zone would complete the term to prevent any regional disruption in the balance of power.

When the draft constitution was submitted to Abacha on June 27, 1995, the military government selectively adopted the spatial framework of the six geopolitical zones while rejecting Ekwueme's strict rotational presidency and multiple vice-presidential provisions. Although the 1995 draft constitution was never formally promulgated due to Abacha's death in 1998, the six geopolitical zones survived as a structural reality. They became universally integrated into Nigeria's administrative, political, and resource-allocation systems under successive civilian administrations.

=== National politics ===
Abacha oversaw the re-organisation of Nigeria into six geopolitical zones, in order to reflect cultural, economic, and political realities of the regions:

- North Central: Benue State, Kogi State, Kwara State, Nasarawa State, Niger State, Plateau State and Federal Capital Territory, Nigeria.
- North East: Adamawa State, Bauchi State, Borno State, Gombe State, Taraba State and Yobe State.
- North West: Jigawa State, Kaduna State, Kano State, Katsina State, Kebbi State, Sokoto State and Zamfara State.
- South East: Abia State, Anambra State, Ebonyi State, Enugu State and Imo State.
- South South: Akwa Ibom State, Bayelsa State, Cross River State, Delta State, Edo State and Rivers State.
- South West: Ekiti State, Lagos State, Ogun State, Ondo State, Osun State and Oyo State.

This was achieved after adding six states to the already existing 30 to make up the present 36 states in the country.

Abacha held a constitutional conference between 1993 and 1995. Early in 1998, Abacha announced that elections would be held on 1 August, with a view toward handing power to a civilian government on 1 October. It later became apparent that Abacha had no intention of relinquishing power. By April 1998, Abacha had coerced the country's five political parties into endorsing him as the sole presidential candidate.

In 1995, following the execution of Ken Saro-Wiwa, Nigeria was suspended from the Commonwealth of Nations. While hosting Nelson Mandela, Abacha admitted he was advised against interfering with Saro-Wiwa's trial—but made assurances that he would use his rank in government to commute the sentence if death sentence was pronounced. Justice Ibrahim Auta was the judge presiding over the proceedings and sentenced Saro-Wiwa to death by hanging. Abacha did not commute the sentence.

In 1997, Muammar Gaddafi's West African Tour to Sani Abacha to mark the new Islamic year directly infringed United Nations Sanctions on Libya, yet he was greeted by thousands of Abacha's supporters who came out to demonstrate their loyalty in Kano. The Libyan leader sought to strengthen relations with the country, as a way to strengthen his agenda of Pan-Africanism.

Abacha intervened in the Liberian Civil War. Through the Economic Community of West African States Monitoring Group, Abacha sent troops to Liberia to fight against the rising insurgency in the country. The Civil War, which began in 1989, saw an influx of Nigerian troops from 1990 when Abacha was defence minister.

Despite being repeatedly condemned by the US State Department, Abacha did have a few ties to American politicians. In 1997, Senator James Inhofe (R-Oklahoma) travelled to Nigeria to meet with Abacha as a representative of the "Family", a group of evangelical Christian politicians and civic leaders. Abacha and the Family had a business and political relationship from that point until his death. Abacha also developed ties with other American political figures such as Senator Carol Moseley Braun (D-Illinois) Rev. Jesse Jackson and Minister Louis Farrakhan. Several African American political leaders visited Nigeria during his reign and Farrakhan supported his administration.

== Personal life and death ==
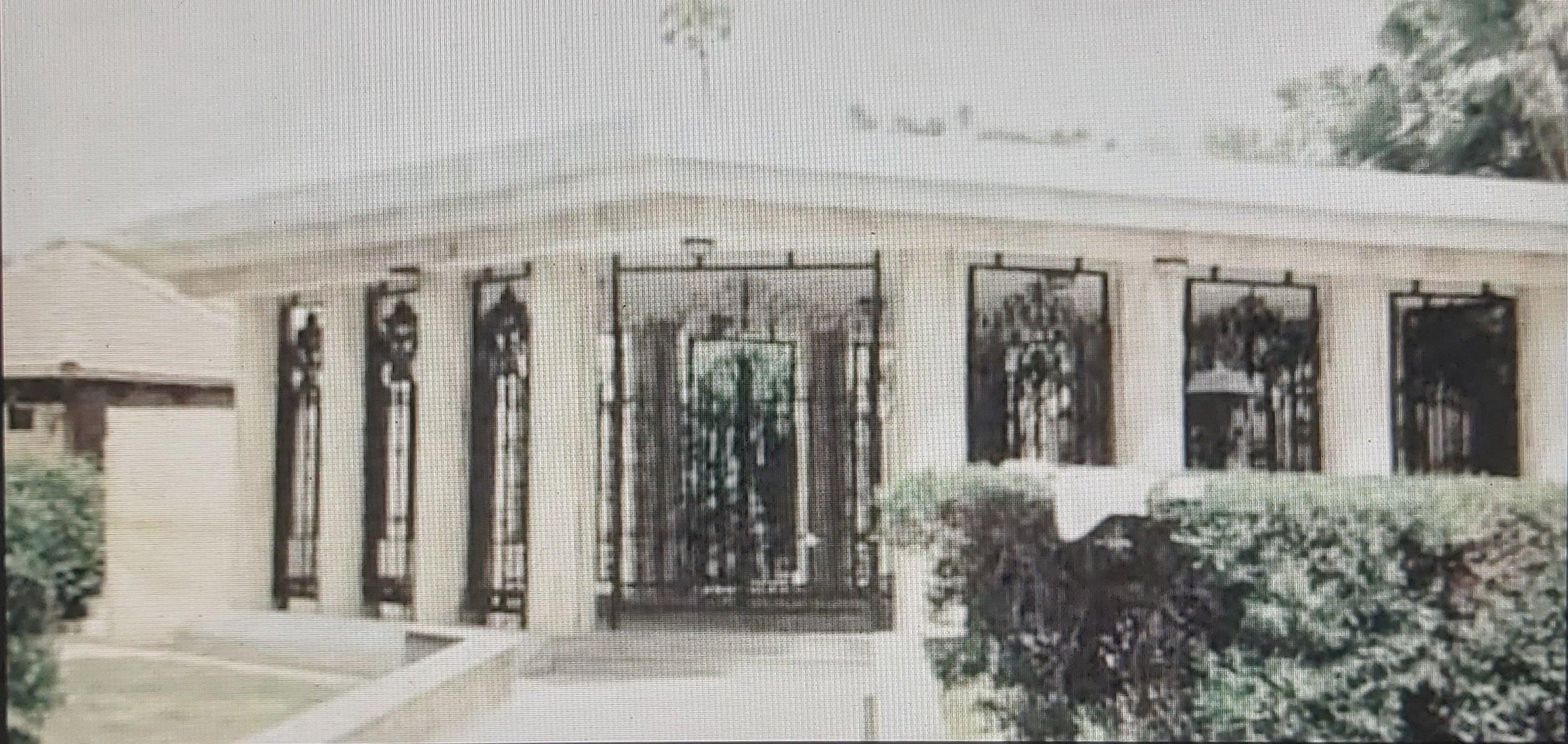
Mausoleum of Sani Abacha in Kano, Nigeria.

Abacha was married to Maryam Abacha and had seven sons and three daughters. As of 2018, he had thirty-three grandchildren.

The scars on his face were tribal markings.

On Monday 8 June 1998, Abacha died in the Aso Rock Presidential Villa in Abuja. He was buried on the same day according to Muslim tradition and without an autopsy, fuelling speculation that he may have been assassinated. The government identified the cause of death as a sudden heart attack. It is believed by foreign diplomats, including United States intelligence analysts, that he may have been poisoned while in the company of prostitutes. His chief security officer, Hamza al-Mustapha, believed he was poisoned by Israeli operatives in the company of Yasser Arafat. At the time of his death, he was allegedly about to transfer power to a civilian government in October 1998, based on a transition plan begun in October 1995 but whose impartiality had been questioned. After Abacha's death, General Abdulsalami Abubakar became head of state, whose short tenure ushered in the Fourth Nigerian Republic.

== Posthumous honours ==
On 20 December 2025, Sani Abacha was posthumously awarded an honorary doctorate by Maryam Abacha American University of Nigeria (MAAUN), Kano, during the institution's maiden graduation ceremony. The award was received on his behalf by his eldest son, Mohammed Abacha.

According to the university, the conferment was made in recognition of Abacha's "institutional leadership" and contributions to Nigeria's administrative development.

== Dates of rank ==
Year	Insignia	Rank
1963		Second lieutenant (Commissioned)
1966		Lieutenant
1967		Captain
1969		Major
1972		Lieutenant colonel
1975		Colonel
1980		Brigadier general
1984		Major general
1987		Lieutenant general
October 1990		General

== See also ==
- Youth Earnestly Ask for Abacha
- List of unsolved deaths

Military offices
Preceded by Ibrahim Babangida	Chief of the Army Staff; 1985–1990	Succeeded by Salihu Ibrahim
Political offices
Preceded by Ernest Shonekan	Chairman of the Provisional Ruling Council of Nigeria; 1993–1998	Succeeded by Abdulsalami Abubakar
Preceded by Jerry Rawlings	Chairman of the Economic Community of West African States; 1996–1998	Succeeded by Abdulsalami Abubakar
