= Christopher Gwabin Musa =

Minister of Defence of Nigeria (born 1967)

General Christopher Gwabin Musa OFR
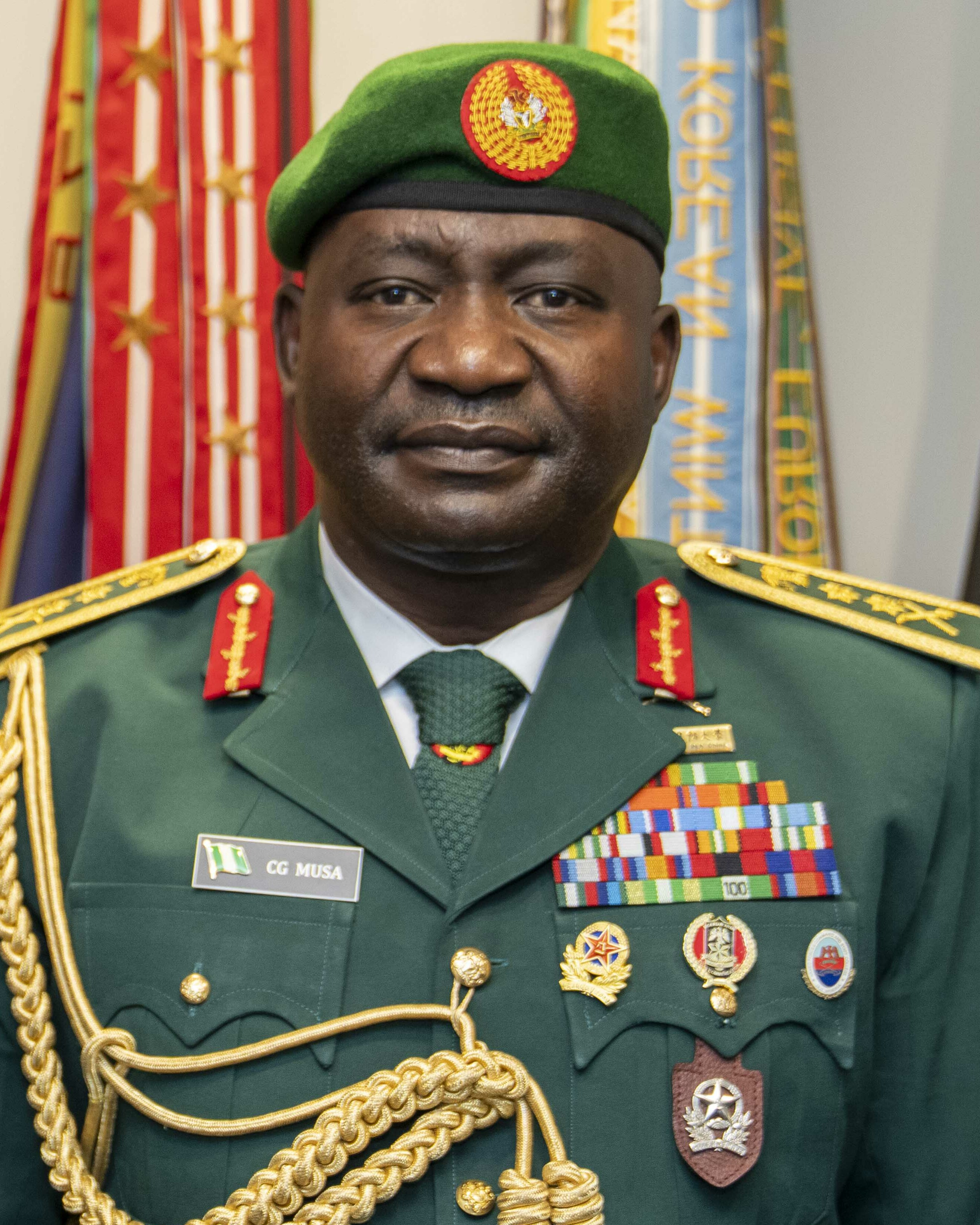
- Musa in 2024

Minister of Defence
- Incumbent
- Assumed office 4 December 2025
- President: Bola Tinubu
- Minister of State: Bello Matawalle
- Preceded by: Mohammed Badaru Abubakar

Chief of Defence Staff
- In office 23 June 2023 – 30 October 2025
- President: Bola Tinubu
- Preceded by: Lucky Irabor
- Succeeded by: Olufemi Oluyede

Personal details
- Born: 25 December 1967 (age 58) Sokoto, North-Western State (now in Sokoto State), Nigeria
- Education: Nigerian Defence Academy; University of Lagos; National Defence University, ICDS-NDU; US Army War College

Military service
- Allegiance: Nigeria
- Branch/service: Nigerian Army
- Years of service: 1986–2025
- Rank: General

General Christopher Gwabin Musa OFR (born 25 December 1967) is a retired Nigerian army general who has served as the minister of defence of Nigeria since December 2025. He previously served as the 18th chief of defence staff of Nigeria from 23 June 2023 until his retirement on 30 October 2025.

== Early life and education ==
Musa was born on 25 December 1967 in Sokoto, in the defunct North-Western State (now in Sokoto State), Nigeria. His family hails from Zangon Kataf, Southern Kaduna State, Nigeria.

In 1974, Musa attended Marafa Danbaba Primary School in Sokoto and left for Model Primary School, located on Dorowa Road, Sokoto, in 1978, where he remained until 1980. He then underwent vocational training in Gaummi, Sokoto, between 1980 and 1981.

In 1981, he was enrolled in Federal Government College, Sokoto, completing his O' levels in 1985. He was part of the National Cadet Corps while enrolled there. He was admitted to the College of Advanced Studies, Zaria, and was there until 1986.

In 1986, Musa was enrolled in the Nigerian Defence Academy, where he obtained a Bachelor of Science (Hons) on graduation on 21 September 1991 as a member of the 38th Regular Course, and was commissioned into the Nigerian Army as a 2nd Lieutenant.

In 1992, Musa underwent a Mechanical Transportation Officers Course, and in 1993, the Young Officers Course in Infantry, the Regimental Signal Officers Course in 1998, and in 2000, a Junior Course at the Armed Forces Command and Staff College, Jaji. Between 2004 and 2005, he attended a Senior Course at the Armed Forces Command and Staff College, Jaji. Between 2007 and 2008, he earned an Advanced Diploma in Security Management from University of Lagos.

Between 2012 and 2013, Musa obtained an Advanced Diploma in Defence and Strategies Course, and a Masters of Science (Military Science), International College of Defence Studies, National Defence University (ICDS-NDU), Changping, China.

In 2017, Musa went through a Combined Joint Land Component Commander's Course on Leadership, US Army War College.

== Career ==
Musa was the General Staff Officer 1, Training/Operations at HQ 81 Division. He also held the positions of Commanding Officer 73 Battalion, Assistant Director Operational Requirements at Department of Army Policy and Plans, Infantry Representative/Member Training Team at HQ Nigerian Army Armour Corps.

In 2019, he was also the Deputy Chief, Staff Training/Operations, headquarters Infantry Centre and Corps, Commander Sector 3 Operation Lafiya Dole, Commander Sector 3 Multinational Joint Task Force in the Lake Chad Region.

In 2021, Musa was the Theatre Commander, Operation Hadin Kai. He later became Commander, Nigerian Army Infantry Corps, a position he held until he was appointed Nigeria's Chief of Defence Staff on June 19, 2023. Musa's appointment as Nigeria's Chief of Defence Staff was confirmed by the Nigerian senate on July 13, 2023.

Following his retirement, Musa was nominated as Nigeria's Minister of Defence by Bola Tinubu, the Nigerian president, on 2 December 2025 and took office on the 4th of December, 2025.

== Awards and accolades ==
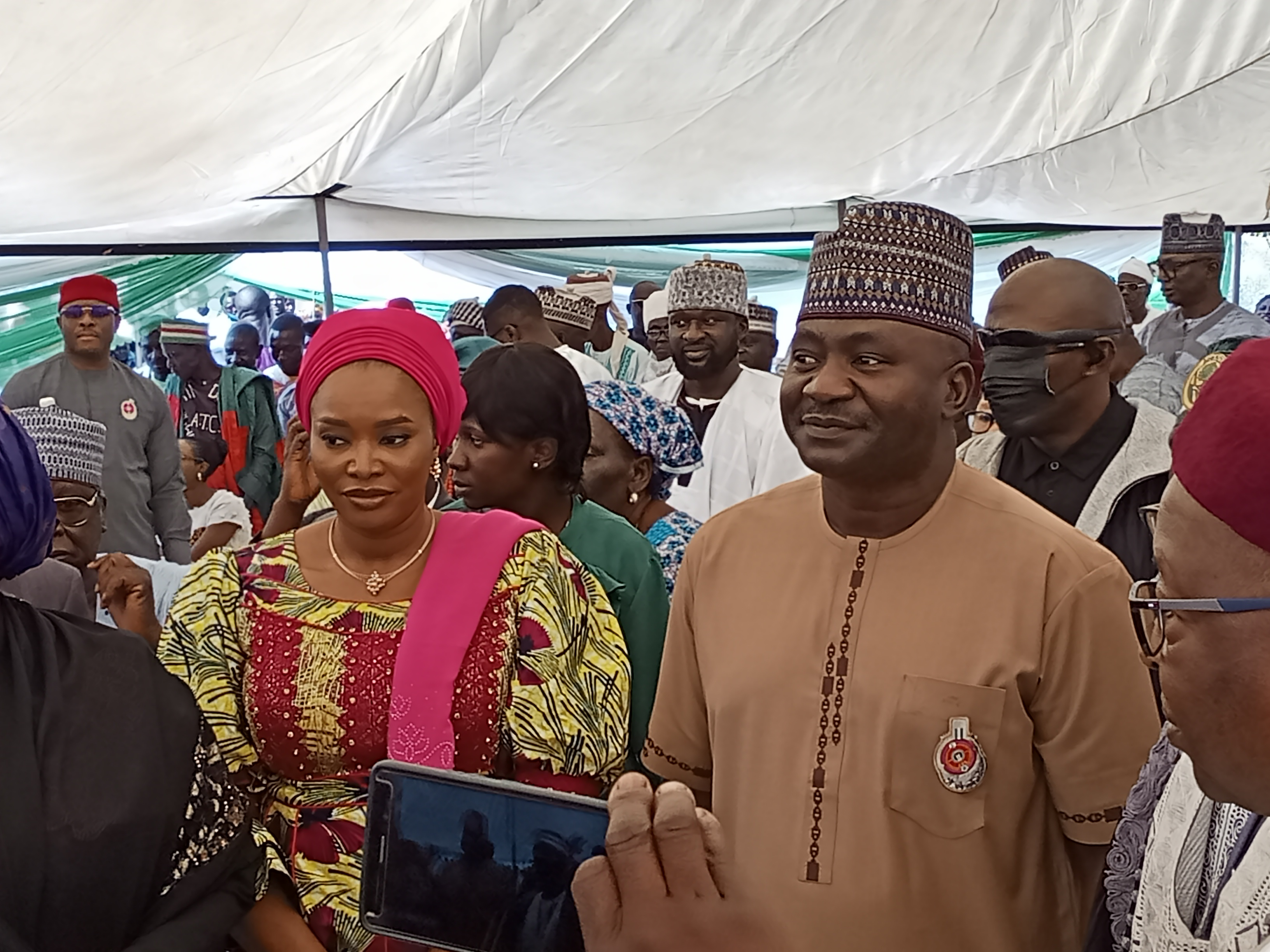
Musa (pictured here with his wife) being honoured with the title of Tsuung Atyap by the Agwatyap, HH Sir Dominic Yahaya on 31 December 2023

In 2022, Musa won the Colin Powell Meritorious Award for Soldiering.

In 2022, the African Youths Initiative For Good Governance and Peace honored him with the Nelson Mandela Exemplary Leadership Award, for his outstanding contributions to peacekeeping, and protection of the Nation’s territorial integrity.

Still, in December 2022, during the 2nd edition of the Africa-Dubai Investment Business Summit held in Dubai, he was awarded the Fellowship of the Institute of Leadership Assessment and Development.

On 23 November 2023, Musa was honored as the Lifetime Achievement Award Recipient of the Year, by the Nigeria Service Awards panel of jury, after he came first place during the online nominations period.

Other awards and accolades received by Musa include the National Honour of the Officer of the Order of the Federal Republic (OFR), the Nigerian Army Medal, the Grand Service Star, the Chief of Army Staff Commendation Award, and the Field Command Medal of Honour.

On 31 December 2023, the Agwatyap’s Buffet was organised by the Atyap Chiefdom in his honor. In the occasion, he was honored with the title Tswung Atyap, meaning "Pillar of Atyap", by HH Sir Dominic Yahaya, paramount ruler of the Atyap Chiefdom.
