= Olufemi Oluyede =

19th Chief of Defence Staff (Nigeria)

General Olufemi Oluyede
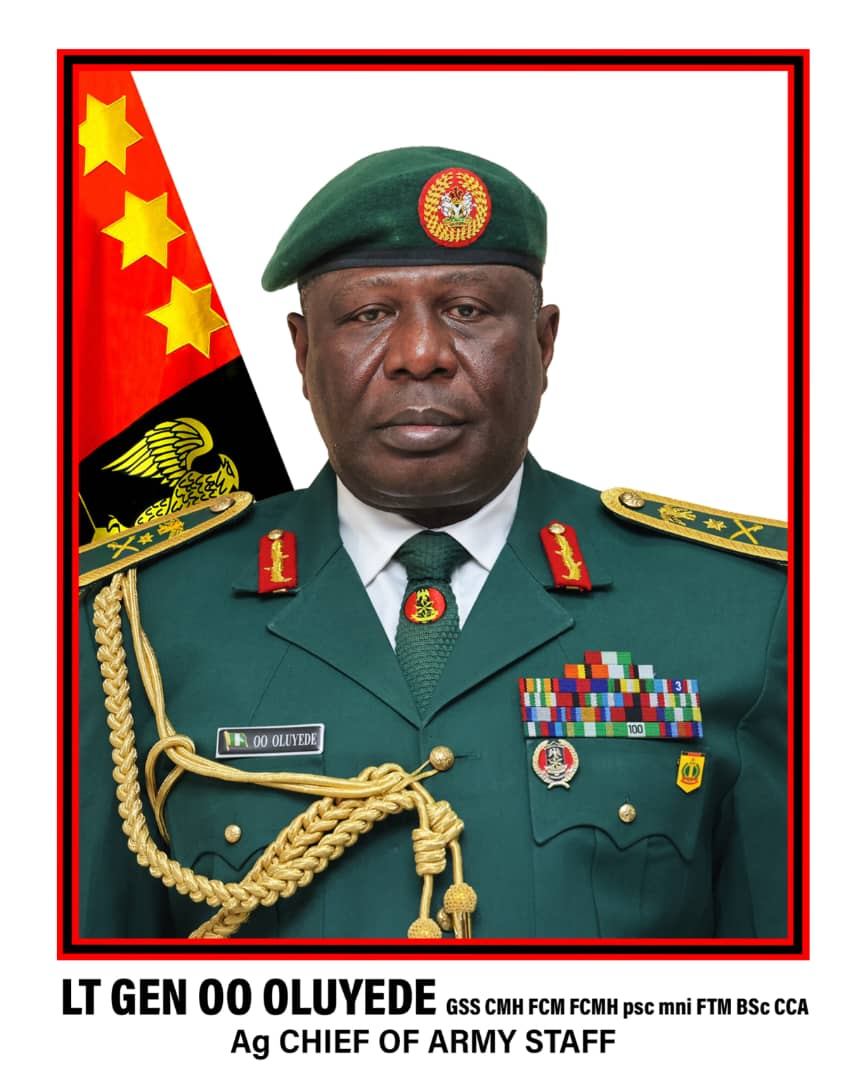
- Official portrait

Chief of Defence Staff
- Incumbent
- Assumed office 30 October 2025
- President: Bola Tinubu
- Preceded by: Christopher Musa

Chief of Army Staff
- In office 30 October 2024 – 30 October 2025
- Preceded by: Taoreed Lagbaja
- Succeeded by: Waidi Shaibu

Personal details
- Born: 21 June 1968 (age 58)
- Education: Nigerian Defence Academy (BSc)

Military service
- Allegiance: Nigeria
- Branch/service: Nigerian Army
- Years of service: 1987–present
- Rank: General

General Olufemi Olatubosun Oluyede (born 21 June 1968) is Nigerian Army officer who is the Chief of Defence Staff of Nigeria since 30 October 2025. He had previously served as the Chief of Army Staff from 30 October 2024 before being elevated to the role of CDS.

== Early life ==
Oluyede was born in Ikere, Ekiti State on 21 June 1968, Oluyede began his military career in 1987 as a cadet in the Nigerian Defence Academy. He was officially commissioned as a second lieutenant in 1992 after completing the Nigerian Army's training regimen.

== Military career ==
Oluyede is a member of the 39th Regular Course of the Nigerian Defence Academy, along with Late Lt. Gen Taoreed Abiodun Lagbaja. His military career has spanned numerous command and staff roles across Nigeria and in various international deployments. Promoted to the rank of major general in 2020, he has many held command that have included Platoon Commander and Adjutant at the 65 Battalion, Company Commander at the 177 Guards Battalion, Staff Officer with the Guards Brigade, Commandant of the Amphibious Training School, and Commander of the 27 Task Force Brigade in the North East, leading operations under Operation Hadin Kai.

He has also participated in international peacekeeping and conflict resolution missions, including the ECOMOG Mission in Liberia and Operation HARMONY IV in Bakassi.

Appointment:

In 2024, Oluyede was appointed Acting Chief of Army Staff by President Bola Tinubu to temporarily fill the position during the indisposition of Lieutenant General Taoreed Lagbaja. His appointment was later confirmed by the senate, and he officially took office on 9 December 2024. Prior to this, Oluyede served as the 56th commander of the Infantry Corps of the Nigerian Army in Jaji, Kaduna.

Honours and decorations

Oluyede's service has earned him numerous awards, including:

- Corps Medal of Honour
- Grand Service Star
- Field Command Medal of Honour
- Field Training Medal
- Chief of Army Staff Commendation Award
- Membership in the National Institute

== Personal life ==
Throughout his career, Oluyede has participated in key operations, including the Economic Community of West African States Monitoring Group (ECOMOG) mission in Liberia, Operation Harmony IV in Bakassi, and Operation Hadin Kai in the North East. He is married and has three children.
