= Nigerian Armed Forces =

Military forces of Nigeria

- Flag of the Nigerian Armed Forces

- Emblems of the Nigerian Armed Forces by service branch
- Founded: 1960
- Current form: 1960
- Service branches: Nigerian Army; Nigerian Air Force; Nigerian Navy
- Headquarters: Nigerian Defence Headquarters, Federal Capital Territory, Abuja

Leadership
- Commander-in-Chief: President Bola Tinubu
- Defence Minister: Christopher Gwabin Musa
- Minister of State for Defence: Bello Matawalle
- Chief of Defence Staff: General Olufemi Oluyede NA

Personnel
- Military age: 18 - 65
- Active personnel: 143,000

Expenditure
- Budget: $4 billion (₦5.04 trillion)
- Percent of GDP: 1% (2025)

Industry
- Foreign suppliers: Brazil; Canada; China; European Union; India; Israel; Pakistan; Republic of Korea; Russia; South Africa; Turkey; Ukraine; United Arab Emirates; United Kingdom; United States

Related articles
- History: Military history of Nigeria List of engagements: Congo Crisis; Nigerian Civil War; Nigeria-Cameroon border conflict; Chadian–Nigerian War; First Liberian Civil War; Communal conflicts in Nigeria; Second Liberian Civil War; Sierra Leone Civil War; Conflict in the Niger Delta; Northern Mali conflict; Boko Haram insurgency; Nigerian bandit conflict; 2016 Niger Delta conflict; Insurgency in Southeastern Nigeria
- Ranks: Military ranks of Nigeria

The Armed Forces of Nigeria (AFN) are the military forces of Nigeria. The forces consist of three service branches: the Nigerian Army, Nigerian Navy, and Nigerian Air Force. The President of Nigeria functions as the commander-in-chief of the armed forces, exercising his constitutional authority through the Ministry of Defence, which is responsible for the management of the military and its personnel. The operational head of the AFN is the Chief of Defence Staff, who is subordinate to the Nigerian Defence Minister.

The Nigerian Armed Forces were established in 1960 as the successor to the combat units of the Royal West African Frontier Force stationed in the country, which had previously served as the British Empire's multi-battalion field force, during Nigeria's protectorate period. Since its creation, the Nigerian military has fought in a civil war – the conflict with Biafra in 1967–70 – and sent peacekeeping forces abroad, both with the United Nations and as the backbone of the Economic Community of West African States Cease-fire Monitoring Group (ECOMOG) in Liberia and Sierra Leone. It has also seized power twice at home (1966 & 1983). Nigeria's armed forces would continue to remain an active element in combat operations throughout the African continent over the proceeding decades, with notable engagements including its 2017 involvement as part of the ECOWAS military intervention in the Gambia.

== Legal standing ==
The roles of a country's armed forces are entrenched in her constitution. The defence of the territorial integrity and other core interests of the nation, form the major substance of such roles. Section 217-220 of the 1999 Constitution of Nigeria thus addresses the Nigerian Armed Forces:

- (1) There shall be an armed forces for the federation, which shall consist of an army, a navy, an air force, and such other branches of the armed forces of the federation, as may be established by an Act of the National Assembly.
- (2) The federation shall, subject to an Act of the National Assembly made in that behalf, equip and maintain the armed forces as may be considered adequate and effective for the purpose of –
- (a) defending Nigeria from external aggression.
- (b) maintaining its territorial integrity and securing its borders from violation on land, sea, or air;
- (c) suppress insurrection and act in aid of civil authorities to restore order, when called upon to do so by the President, but subject to such conditions as may be prescribed by an Act of the National Assembly; and
- (d) perform such other functions as may be prescribed by an act of the National Assembly.
- (3) The composition of the officer corps and other ranks of the armed forces of the Federation shall reflect the federal character of Nigeria.

== History ==
The origin of the Nigerian Armed Forces lies in the elements of the Royal West African Frontier Force, that became Nigerian when independence was granted in 1960. In 1956, the Nigeria Regiment of the Royal West African Frontier Force (RWAFF) was renamed the Nigerian Military Forces, RWAFF, and in April 1958, the colonial government of Nigeria took over from the British War Office control of the Nigerian Military Forces.

Shortly after its formation, the NAF was engaged in combat operations against the secessionist state of Biafra, during the Nigerian Civil War from 1967 to 1970. At this point, the Nigerian military ballooned in strength from 85,000 personnel in 1967 to more than 250,000 troops by the war's end. In the years following the civil war, the Nigerian Armed Forces were halved in size from its post-war height to approximately 125,000 men. Despite this contraction in the size and funding of its armed forces, Nigeria would boast the only military in West Africa capable of engaging in foreign military operations, such as during its intervention in Liberian civil war in 1990.

The great expansion of the military during the civil war further entrenched the existing military hold on Nigerian society, carried over from the first military regime. In doing so, it played an appreciable part in reinforcing the military's nearly first-among-equals status within Nigerian society, and the linked decline in military effectiveness. Olusegun Obasanjo, who by 1999, had become president, bemoaned the fact in his inaugural address that year: "... Professionalism has been lost... my heart bleeds to see the degradation in the proficiency of the military."

Today, the NAF faces a number of domestic challenges which continue to undermine stability within Nigeria and the region as a whole. Some of these threats include the ongoing conflict against the jihadist rebel group, Boko Haram in northeastern Nigeria, which has been in effect since July 2009. Likewise, Nigeria has been engaged in a long-running anti-piracy campaign in the Niger Delta, which has threatened the vital petroleum industry in the country, which is the source of 90% of Nigeria's exports and 35% of the government's revenue. Compounding this state of affairs is the role corruption plays in the ongoing attempts to strengthen the armed forces. Corruption has historically weakened the Nigerian military's capacity to face internal security threats and is cited as being responsible for the continued longevity of rebels and terrorists operating throughout the nation.

In spite of these challenges to its operational readiness, the Nigerian Armed Forces have committed to a number of wide-ranging modernization programs to bolster the discipline and firepower of its troops. This includes the acquisition of new armored vehicles, combat aircraft and aerial reconnaissance drones, and the refurbishing of naval vessels, which had suffered from prolonged periods of poor or minimal maintenance. These trends in the development of the armed forces as a fighting force, as well as efforts to combat corruption within the ranks of military personnel and government bureaucracy, have been critically important in the ability of Nigeria to confront challenges to its national security and stability in the wider region of West Africa as a whole.

== Structure ==
=== Service branches ===
==== Army ====
The Nigerian Army (NA) is the land branch of the Nigerian Armed Forces and the largest among the armed forces. Its major formations include the 1st Division, 2nd Division, 3rd Armoured Division, 81st Division, 82nd Division and the newly formed 8th, 7th and 6th Divisions. The Nigerian army is headed currently by Lieutenant General Waidi Shaibu, who was appointed by President Bola Ahmed Tinubu. The Nigerian Army has been playing a major role in defence of Nigerian Democracy since the first republic till date.

==== Navy ====
The Nigerian Navy (NN) is the sea branch of the Nigerian Armed Forces. The Nigerian Navy command structure today consists of the Naval Headquarters in Abuja as well as three other operational commands with headquarters in Lagos, Calabar and Bayelsa. The training command headquarters are located in Lagos, the commercial capital of Nigeria, but with training facilities spread all over Nigeria. There are five operational bases; five forward operational bases (with two more soon to come on stream), two dockyards located in Lagos and Port Harcourt and two fleets based in Lagos and Calabar. The Nigerian Navy is currently headed by Vice Admiral Idi Abbas.

==== Air Force ====
Roundel of the Nigerian Air Force

The Nigerian Air Force was formally established in January 1964, with technical assistance from West Germany. The Air Force started as a transport unit, with the aircrew being trained in Canada, Ethiopia and Pakistan. The Air Force did not get combat capability until a number of MiG-17 aircraft were presented by the Soviet Union in 1966.

In 2007, the Air Force had a strength of 10,000. It flies transport, trainer, helicopter, and fighter aircraft. By 2021, the number of Air Force personnel had increased to 18,000.

The Air Force sponsors the Air Force Military School, Jos, Nigeria and the Air Force Institute of Technology. Nigeria also has pursued a policy of developing domestic training and military production capabilities. Nigeria has continued a strict policy of diversification in its military procurement from various countries. The Nigerian Air force is currently headed by Air Marshal Sunday Aneke.

=== Training establishments ===
Training establishments in Nigeria include the prestigious officer entry: Nigerian Defence Academy at Kaduna, the Armed Forces Command and Staff College, Jaji, and the National War College at Abuja. The U.S. commercial military contractor, Military Professional Resources Inc. has been involved around 1999–2000 in advising on civil-military relations for the armed forces.

== Personnel equipment ==
Name	Photo	Country of origin	Type	Notes
Camouflage
M14 Woodland/Arid Pattern		Nigeria	Combat uniform	Standard Issue Uniform for Nigerian Armed Forces Service Members for Overseas Deployment
MultiCam		United States	Combat uniform	Currently used by special forces
Digital Camouflage		Nigeria	Combat uniform	Currently used by special forces, both the Woodland/Arid Pattern
Helmet
PASGT		Nigeria; United States	Combat Helmet	Standard Combat Helmet of the Nigerian Military. Nigerian derivative of the American PASGT
MICH		Nigeria; United States	Combat Helmet	Standard Combat Helmet of the Nigerian Military. Nigerian-made version of the American MICH
FAST		Nigeria; United States	Combat Helmet	Combat helmet of the Nigerian Special Forces.
Ballistic vest
Soldier Plate Carrier System		Nigeria	Bulletproof vest	The Army and Special Forces use multiple tactical vests and plate carriers from local manufacturers.
Modular Tactical Vest		Nigeria	Bulletproof vest	Standard Issued for the Military from local manufacturers.
Thermal imager/Night Vision
Thales Sophie-LR		France	Thermal Imager	In Service

== Nigerian military operations abroad ==
In the Presidential election held on 6 August 1983, incumbent Shehu Shagari received 48% of the vote. His National Party of Nigeria won the parliamentary elections some weeks later. In December 1983, the new Major General Muhammadu Buhari regime announced that Nigeria could no longer afford an activist anti-colonial role in Africa. Anglophone ECOWAS members established ECOMOG, dominated by the Nigerian Army in 1990, to intervene in the civil war in Liberia. The Army has demonstrated its capability to mobilize, deploy, and sustain brigade-sized forces in support of peacekeeping operations in Liberia. Smaller army forces have been previously sent on UN and ECOWAS deployments in the former Yugoslavia, Guinea-Bissau, and Sierra Leone. This doctrine of African military intervention by Nigeria is sometimes called Pax Nigeriana.

That policy statement did not deter Nigeria under Generals Ibrahim Babangida in 1990 and Sani Abacha in 1997, from sending ECOMOG peacekeeping forces under the auspices of ECOWAS into Liberia and later Sierra Leone, when the First Liberian Civil War and the First Liberian Civil War broke out. When the Second Liberian Civil War ended in August 2003, President Olusegun Obasanjo committed the Nigerian troops once again to Liberia, at the appeal of the United States, to provide an interim presence until the United Nations Mission in Liberia (UNMIL) arrived. Charles Taylor was subsequently eased out of power and exiled to Nigeria.

In October 2004, the Nigerian troops were deployed to Darfur, Sudan, to spearhead an African Union force, to stop the Darfur genocide. Nigeria has contributed more than 20,000 troops/police to various UN missions since 1960. The Nigerian Police Force and troops have participated in:

- UNIPOM – India and Pakistan, 1965
- UNIFIL – Lebanon, 1978
- UNIIMOG – Iran and Iraq, 1988
- UNPROFOR – Former Yugoslavia, 1998
- UNMISET – East Timor, 1999
- MONUC – Democratic Republic of the Congo, 2004

Nigerian officers have served as Chiefs of Defence in other countries, with Brigadier General Maxwell Khobe, serving as Sierra Leone Chief of Staff in 1998–1999, and Nigerian officers acting as Command Officer-in-Charge of the Armed Forces of Liberia from at least, 2007.
