= Hamza Abdullahi =

Nigerian statesman and military administrator (1945–2019)

Air Vice Marshal Hamza Abdullahi

Minister of Federal Capital Territory
- In office 1986–1989
- Preceded by: Mamman Jiya Vatsa
- Succeeded by: Gado Nasko

Governor of Kano State
- In office 4 January 1984 – 26 August 1985
- Preceded by: Sabo Bakin Zuwo
- Succeeded by: Ahmed Muhammad Daku

Personal details
- Born: 2 March 1945 Hadejia, Northern Region, British Nigeria (now Hadejia, Nigeria)
- Died: 3 January 2019 (aged 73) Frankfurt, Germany
- Party: none (military)

Military service
- Allegiance: Nigeria
- Branch/service: Nigerian Air Force
- Years of service: 1964–1988
- Rank: Air Vice Marshal
- Battles/wars: Nigerian Civil War

Hamza Abdullahi (2 March 1945 – 3 January 2019) was a Nigerian statesman and military administrator who served as Governor of Kano State from 1984 to 1985; and Minister of the Federal Capital Territory from 1986 to 1989.

== Early life ==
Hamza Abdullahi was born in Hadejia (now in Jigawa State) and was educated in Kano.

== Military career ==
He joined the Nigeria Air Force in 1964, and attended the Nigeria Air Force Tactical Training Wing in Kaduna. From 1964 to 1966, he completed the Aircraft Technical Officer's Course in West Germany, and later took part in the Nigerian Civil War effort. After the war, he was the Air Provost Marshal, Air Provost Group from 1971 to 1980; and also attended the Royal Military Police Training Centre in Chichester in 1974. He participated in the 1975 military coup d'état which brought General Murtala Mohammed to power; and from 1980 to 1984 was the Group Commander, Ground Training Group in Kaduna.

== Military governor ==
Following the 1983 military coup d'état, the military head of state General Muhamadu Buhari appointed Hamza Abdullahi military Governor of Kano State (now Kano State and Jigawa State) in January 1984. His administration was tasked by the Federal Military Government to implement the War Against Indiscipline campaign in Kano State, which was flagged off by General Tunde Idiagbon. As military governor, Hamza Abdullahi later took part in the 1985 military coup d'état which brought General Ibrahim Babangida to power.

== Federal minister ==
In September 1985, he was appointed Minister of Works and Housing. In this role he oversaw the construction of the Abuja-Kaduna-Kano dual carriage road. In 1986, following the General Mamman Vatsa abortive coup, Hamza Abdullahi was appointed Minister of the Federal Capital Territory and a member of the ruling Armed Forces Ruling Council.

He was ordered to ensure the successful relocation of the seat of government from Lagos to Abuja. His goal was to have 75% of the ministries in Abuja by 1990, the target date for the official relocation of the capital from Lagos. During his tenure, he oversaw the construction of Phase 1: with the main districts of Maitama and Asokoro and several federal monuments including the city gate; the Aso Rock Presidential Villa and the military barracks.

== Later life ==
In October 1988, he was promoted to Air Vice Marshal the third highest rank in the Nigerian Air Force, and retired two months later. In retirement, he lived a private life – and was a director at Julius Berger, a German construction and engineering company; Dantata and Sawoe Construction Company Limited, a Nigerian-German construction company. He was widely respected for his military professionalism and disciplinary pedigree, he was an associate and close friend of General Ibrahim Babangida.

== Death ==
He died on 3 January 2019, in a German hospital after a protracted illness.
