= Yohanna Kure =

Nigerian army officer

Major General Yohanna Yerima Kura
- Born: April 22nd, 1939; Kurmin Musa, Kaduna State, Nigeria
- Died: November 2nd, 2023 Kaduna (city), Kaduna State, Nigeria
- Allegiance: Federal Republic of Nigeria
- Rank: Major General
- Commands: 82nd Division

Yohanna Yarima Kure (April 22nd, 1939 - November 2nd, 2023) was a Nigerian army officer. He was a member of the Armed Forces Ruling Council (1985-1987) at the onset of Ibrahim Babangida's administration and was member of the Supreme Military Council of Nigeria (1983–1985) in Buhari's military government.

Kure is a former General Officer Commanding (GOC) 82nd Division, Enugu and the 2nd Mechanized Division, Ibadan.

== Life ==
Kure hails from Kurmin Musa in Kachia Local Government Area, southern, Kaduna State, Nigeria. He attended Provincial Secondary School, Zaria (1957 - 1962). In 1963, he joined Nigeria Military Training College and had further military training at Officer Cadet School, Portsea, Australia in 1964. Kure later attended the Command and Staff College, Jaji, in 1976. In 1982, he attended a course at the National Institute of Policy and Strategic Studies where he wrote the paper, Logistics in Military Campaign: A case Study of the Nigerian Civil War.

Kure was appointed Lieutenant in 1966, Captain in 1969 and Major in 1970. He was promoted Lt. Col in 1975 and became a Colonel in 1980. In 1983, he was appointed to the rank of Brigadier. Kure was a member of the Special Military Tribunal that adjudicated suspected participants of the Mamman Vatsa coup of 1986. In 1990, he was head of the Second Tribunal that tried suspected members of the Gideon Orkar led coup in 1990. Upon the appointment of Salihu Ibrahim as Chief of Army Staff, Kure and other Generals who were higher in rank to Ibrahim were retired. However, Babangida gave him a ministerial post after his retirement. He was Minister of Culture and Social Welfare in 1990 and was redeployed to the Sports Ministry in 1992. He died 2 November 2023.
