= Buharism =

Nigerian political ideology

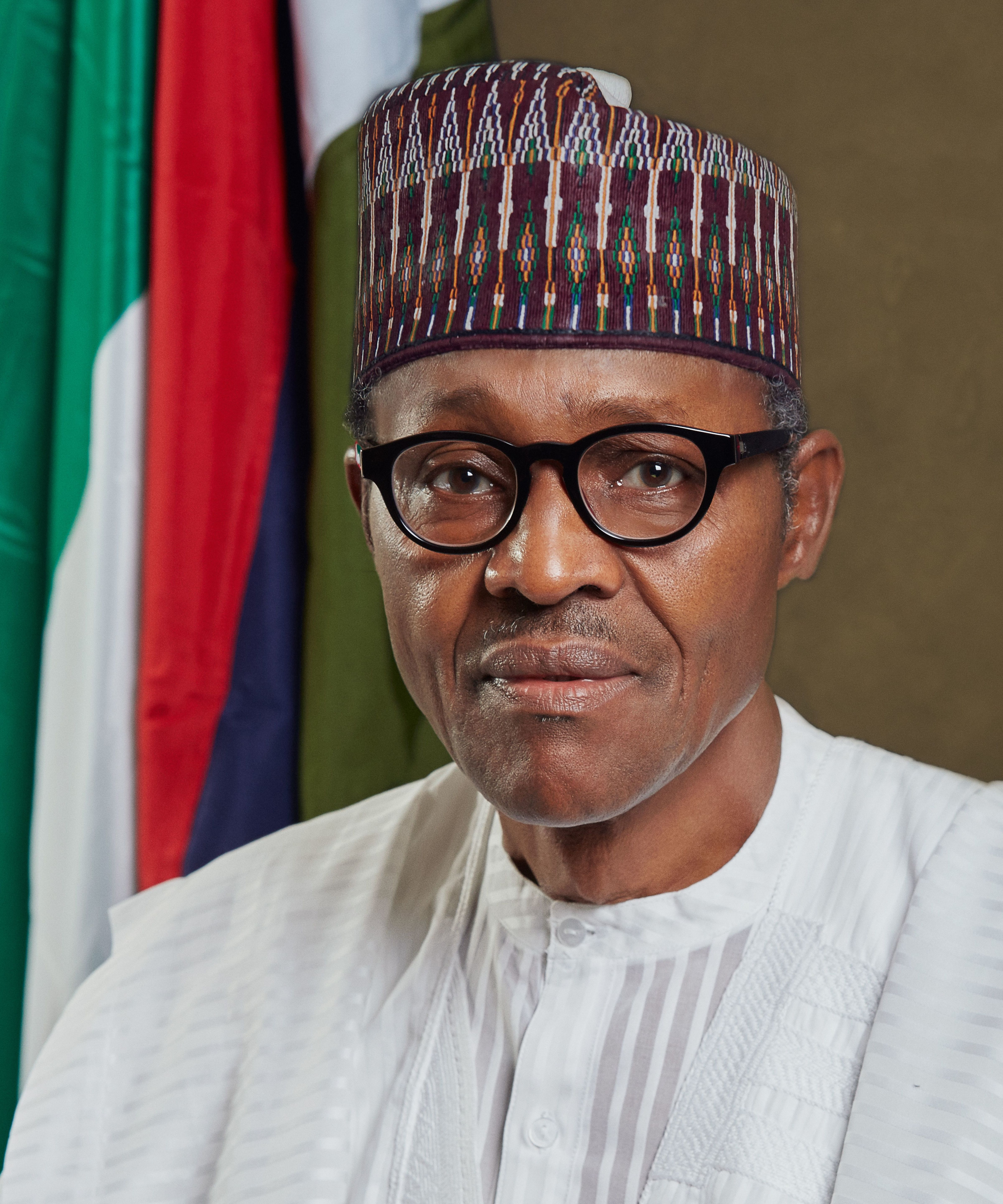
Muhammadu Buhari, after whom Buharism is named

Buharism refers to the socio-political and economic ideology of Muhammadu Buhari, former military head of state and president of Nigeria. Following the 1983 Nigerian coup d'etat which truncated the Second Nigerian Republic, General Muhammadu Buhari became military head of state. He immediately launched an unprecedented military-led social engineering campaign, War Against Indiscipline, with the aim of forcibly promoting civic virtues.

Buharism came to represent a national third force at the height of the Cold War era, favouring neither communism nor capitalism. His economic ideology was solely predicated on the practicalities needed for a Third World nation to develop: mainly economic self-sufficiency, disciplined citizenry, and national development. As the supreme leader and commander of the regime, Buhari significantly derived charismatic authority.

The revisionist 1985 Nigerian coup d'état was the antithesis of Buharism; his Chief of Army Staff and successor General Ibrahim Babangida opposed the heavy-handedness of Buhari's social campaign and the economic dirigisme policies. Babangida later went on to become the longest-serving post-Civil War military head of state; his regime saw a drastic re-alignment towards the rapidly emerging new international order with the introduction of the IMF-sanctioned programmes: privatisation, deregulation, and devaluation.

Imprisoned and subsequently out of power for 30 years, Muhammadu Buhari contested the 2003, 2007, 2011, and later 2015 presidential elections, winning the last one and defeating the incumbent Goodluck Jonathan. Buharism gradually transformed into a cult of personality and initially enjoyed broad support throughout the country, especially in Northern Nigeria, until the 2019 Nigerian presidential election, which caused a significant decline in Buhari's popularity.

== Overview ==
Buharism is anchored on the economic direction of a centre-left progressive ideology. Its economic reforms are characterised as moving the political economy away from the control of "parasitic" elites and into the control of a "productive class". To its students, Buharism represents a two-way struggle: with external globalism and with its internal agents and advocates.

Its agenda for social order shows a demonstrable character of State Consequentialism. Consequentialists believe that the morality of an action is contingent on the action's outcome, therefore an action is right if it delivers a greater good for a greater number of people. An action is therefore right if it leads to state order, welfare of the people, and their material prosperity.

== Economic ideology ==
Buharism rejects the dominant approach of the Washington Consensus, rather holding that for a crisis-wracked country to successfully improve its balance of payments through devaluation, there must first exist the condition that the price of every country's export is denominated in its own currency. In the case of Nigeria, it largely exported crude oil, which was sold on dollar terms, and exported no finished goods, which would be priced cheaper by devaluation and result in supposed economic recovery under the Washington Consensus model. As such a condition did not exist, Buharism asserted that, for any country where Washington Consensus conditions do not exist clearly enough, there are alternate approaches to solving the problem of its economic crisis. Therefore, instead of applying devaluation to get the then crisis-wracked economy of Nigeria back on track, Buharism instead employed a policy of curbing imports of goods deemed unnecessary, curtailing oil theft, and improving exports through a counter trade policy of bartering seized bunkered crude oil for goods like machinery, enabling it to export above its OPEC quota.

== Neo-Buharism ==
In 2015, with Muhammadu Buhari's return to power as a civilian president, and faced with an economic crisis that included a massive downturn in global oil prices, record level of unemployment, un-diversified economy, and security challenges that cut production without savings due to institutional decay and corruption in successive administrations, Buharism meant an inward-focused strategy that rejected austerity measures targeting the poorest while enhancing investments in infrastructure and leveraging state powers to cut imports.

Buharism as an economic policy emphasizes providing incremental domestic production and thus job opportunities by restricting imports and encouraging import substitution. It also emphasizes state investments in infrastructure while curtailing corruption to increase productivity and recovering the economic resources captured by established power blocs to provide social safety nets for the poorest during the transition period to economic self-sufficiency.

== Criticism ==
Critics have often referred to Buhari's political outlook as dictatorial and authoritarian. The election-centric outlook of Buharism has often been described as an illiberal democracy.

Buharism, they argue, and its emphasis on state consequentialism, evidently gives rise to an anti-aristocratic police state as opposed to a legal state. This political anomaly further extends towards a dichotomic relationship between the apparatus of the state on the one hand and legalism on the other, supported by the ruling elite.

== See also ==
- All Nigeria Peoples Party (1998–2013)
- Congress for Progressive Change (2009–2013)
- All Progressives Congress (2013–)
