= 1990 Nigerian coup attempt =

1990 coup attempt by Major Gideon Orkar in Nigeria

1990 Nigerian coup d'état attempt
Date	April 22, 1990
Location	Nigeria
Result	Coup fails.: Ibrahim Babangida remains in power.

Belligerents
(Nigeria) Military government: Armed Forces Ruling Council (AFRC)	Armed Forces faction

Commanders and leaders
Ibrahim Babangida	Gideon Orkar

The 1990 Nigerian coup d'état attempt was a military coup attempt which took place in Nigeria on 22 April 1990 when a faction of Armed Forces officers, led by Major Gideon Orkar, attempted to overthrow the government of General Ibrahim Babangida (who himself took power in the 1985 coup d'état). Rebel troops seized the FRCN radio station and various military posts around Lagos, including the military headquarters and presidential residence, the Dodan Barracks. Babangida was present when the barracks were attacked but managed to escape by a back route. In the coup address, Orkar called for the excision of five northern states of Nigeria, he accused President Babangida of planning to install himself as Nigeria's life president, accused the Federal Military Government of marginalization of the people of Niger Delta and the entire Southern part of the country.

In his letter addressed to the nation through a live broadcast at around 4am of April 22, 1990, they made a stunning announcement expelling indigenous people of far North states of Bauchi, Borno, Katsina, Kano and Sokoto from Nigeria. Analysts have argued that part of the reason for the coup's failure was the ethnic undertones and bias that accompanied their coup speech broadcast. Also, the amateurish excise of citizens of the core North away from military and civil life was naturally going to divide the same people whose support they would have needed especially at such an infant stage of their coup plot. In fact, military officers of Northern extraction rallied in support of the FMG when they found out it was a plot targeting their very existence.

Although, the coup was identified to be masterminded by Major Gideon Orkar, the trial of the April 22, 1990 coup and other evidences shows that he was just a conduit and not the original mastermind behind the coup. The ideological arrowheads of the coup were Lt. Colonel Anthony Nyiam, Major Saliba Mukoro, Major Cyril Obahor and it was only in the latter stages of the coup that Orkar was recruited into the plot. It must also be said that millionaire businessman Chief Great Ovedje Ogboru was the top financier of the coup.

Hundreds of people, including some civilians, were arrested after the coup attempt and the death toll involved in the shootouts between the rebel forces and the government troops coupled with the post-trial executions that took place made it the bloodiest coup d'état in Nigeria's history. Orkar and 41 of his co-conspirators were confronted and captured by government troops. They were convicted of treason. On 27 July 1990, they were executed by firing squad.
