= Ibrahim Babangida =

Military President of Nigeria from 1985 to 1993

General Ibrahim Babangida GCFR
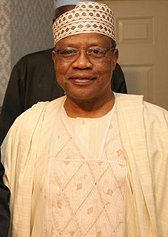

8th President of Nigeria
- In office 27 August 1985 – 26 August 1993
- Vice President: Ebitu Ukiwe (1985–1986); Augustus Aikhomu (1986–1993)
- Preceded by: Muhammadu Buhari (as Military Head of State)
- Succeeded by: Ernest Shonekan (as Interim Head of State)

Chief of Army Staff
- In office 1 January 1984 – 26 August 1985
- Preceded by: Mohammed Inuwa Wushishi
- Succeeded by: Sani Abacha

Personal details
- Born: 17 August 1941 (age 85) Minna, Northern Region, British Nigeria (now in Niger State, Nigeria)
- Party: Peoples Democratic Party
- Spouse: Maryam Babangida (m. 1969; died 2009)
- Children: 4
- Education: Royal Armoured Centre
- Occupation: Politician; military officer

Military service
- Allegiance: Nigeria
- Branch: Nigerian Army
- Service years: 1962–1993
- Rank: General
- Conflict: Nigerian Civil War

Ibrahim Badamasi Babangida GCFR GCB (born 17 August 1941) is a Nigerian general and politician who ruled as military president of Nigeria from 1985 when he orchestrated a coup d'état against Muhammadu Buhari, until he stepped aside in 1993 as a result of the crisis of the Third Republic.

He rose through the ranks of the Nigerian Army fighting in the Nigerian Civil War and at various times being involved in almost all the military coups in Nigeria, before advancing to the rank of a General and ultimately as Commander-in-Chief of the Armed Forces; and as an unelected President and military dictator from 1985 to 1993, ruling for an uninterrupted period of eight years. His years in power, colloquially known as the Babangida Era, are considered one of the most controversial in Nigerian political and military history, being characterized by a burgeoning political culture of corruption in Nigeria, with Babangida and his regime estimated to have misappropriated at least 12 billion dollars (23.9 billion today).

The Babangida regime oversaw the establishment of a state security apparatus, survived two coup d'état attempts, and the subsequent execution of Mamman Vatsa (1985) and Gideon Orkar (1990) alongside the trial of hundreds of soldiers. The Babangida era also witnessed the assassination in Lagos of a prominent journalist named Dele Giwa (1986). The regime also faced a series of ethnic and religious outbreaks related to the fallout of Babangida's decision to increase cooperation with the Muslim world and rise in extremist tendencies. On the continent, his rule projected the country as a regional power with diplomatic successes including the Abuja Treaty and the military engagement of Nigerian troops in Liberia and Sierra Leone.

Abroad, Babangida's military regime cemented traditional relations with the English-speaking world of the United States and the United Kingdom, and implemented economic liberalization and the privatization of state-owned enterprises alongside a national mass mobilization. The fall of Babangida and his regime was precipitated by the transition toward the Third Nigerian Republic and the subsequent militarization of politics in the 1993 presidential election which he annulled.

== Early life ==
Ibrahim Babangida was born on 17 August 1941 in Minna to Muhammad and Aisha Babangida. He received early Islamic education before attending primary school from 1950 to 1956. From 1957 to 1962 Babangida attended Government College Bida, together with classmates Abdulsalami Abubakar, Mamman Vatsa, Mohammed Magoro, Sani Bello, Garba Duba, Gado Nasko and Mohammed Sani Sami. Babangida joined the Nigerian Army on 10 December 1962, where he attended the Nigerian Military Training College in Kaduna. Babangida received his commission as a second lieutenant as a regular combatant officer in the Royal Nigerian Army (a month before it became the Nigerian Army) with the personal army number N/438 from the Indian Military Academy on 26 September 1963. Babangida attended the Indian Military Academy from April to September 1963.

He was Commanding Officer of 1 Reconnaissance Squadron from 1964 to 1966. From January 1966 to April 1966, Babangida attended the Younger Officers Course at the Royal Armoured Centre in the United Kingdom – where he received instruction in gunnery and the Saladin armored car. Lieutenant Babangida was posted with the 1st Reconnaissance Squadron in Kaduna, and witnessed the events of the bloody coup d'état of 1966, which resulted in the assassination of Sir Ahmadu Bello. Alongside several young officers from Northern Nigeria, he took part in the July counter-coup led by Murtala Mohammed which ousted General Aguiyi Ironsi replacing him with General Yakubu Gowon.

== Military career ==
=== Civil war ===
Following the outbreak of the civil war, Babangida was recalled and posted to the 1st Division under the command of General Mohammed Shuwa. In 1968, he became commander of the 44 Infantry Battalion which was involved in heavy fighting within Biafran territory. In 1969, during a reconnaissance operation from Enugu to Umuahia, the battalion came under heavy enemy fire and Babangida was shot on the right side of his chest. He was then hospitalized in Lagos, and was given the option of removing the bullet shrapnel, which he refused and still carries with him. Away and recovering from his wounds, Babangida married Maryam King on 6 September 1969. He returned to the war front in December 1969, commanding a battalion. In January 1970, Babangida was informed by his sectional commander General Theophilus Danjuma of the capitulation of the Biafran Army to the Federal military government in Lagos, signaling the end of the war.

=== After the war ===
In 1970, following the war Babangida was promoted twice and posted to the Nigerian Defence Academy as an instructor. From August 1972 to June 1973, he attended the Advanced Armoured Officers Course at the United States Army Armor School. In 1973, he was made commander of the 4 Reconnaissance Regiment. In 1975, he became the commander of the Nigerian Army Armoured Corps. Babangida attended several defence and strategy courses. Colonel Babangida as Commander of the Armoured Corps was a key participant in the coup d'état of 1975.

He was later appointed as one of the youngest members of the Supreme Military Council from 1 August 1975 to October 1979. Colonel Babangida crushed almost single-handedly the coup d'état of 1976 that resulted in the assassination of General Murtala Mohammed by taking back control of the Radio Nigeria station from the main perpetrator, Lieutenant Colonel Buka Suka Dimka. From January 1977 to July 1977, he attended the Senior Officers Course at the Armed Forces Command and Staff College, Jaji. From 1979 to 1980, he attended the Senior Executive Course at the National Institute of Policy and Strategic Studies.

=== Army Staff Headquarters ===
Babangida was the Director of Army Staff Duties and Plans from 1981 to 1983. He was the main figure behind the coup d'ètat of 1983 which led to the overthrow of the Second Republic, with financial backing from his close associate and businessman Moshood Abiola. Babangida alongside his other co-conspirators later appointed the most senior serving officer at the time General Muhammadu Buhari as military head of state from 1983 to 1985; and Babangida was promoted and appointed as Chief of Army Staff and member of the Supreme Military Council.

== Coup d'état of 1985 ==
=== Planning ===
Following the coup d'état of 1983, General Babangida (then Chief of Army Staff) started scheming to overthrow military head of state General Muhammadu Buhari. The palace coup of 1985 was orchestrated with a degree of military deftness hitherto not observed in prior military coups in the country. The whole affair carried out by Babangida as ringleader was planned at the highest levels of the army cultivating his strategic relationship with allies: Sani Abacha, Aliyu Gusau, Halilu Akilu, Mamman Vatsa, Gado Nasko, and younger officers from his days as an instructor in the military academy (graduates of the NDA's Regular Course 3), and gradually positioned his allies within the echelons of military hierarchy.

=== Execution ===
The execution of the palace coup was initially delayed due to General Tunde Idiagbon the 6th Chief of Staff, Supreme Headquarters, and ruthless second-in-command to General Muhammadu Buhari. At midnight on 27 August 1985, the plot metamorphosed with four Majors: Sambo Dasuki, Abubakar Dangiwa Umar, Lawan Gwadabe, and Abdulmumini Aminu detailed to arrest the head of state. By daybreak, the conspirators had taken over the government and Babangida flew into Lagos from Minna where he was announced as the new commander-in-chief in a radio broadcast by General Sani Abacha. Babangida justified the coup in a speech describing General Muhammadu Buhari's military regime as "too rigid".

=== Promulgation ===
Babangida ruling by decree promulgated his official title as the President and Commander-in-Chief of the Armed Forces of the Federal Republic of Nigeria and placed Muhammadu Buhari under house arrest in Benin until 1988. He established the Armed Forces Ruling Council (AFRC) as the highest law-making council serving as chairman; he also restructured the national security apparatus, tasking General Aliyu Gusau as Co-ordinator of National Security directly reporting to him in the president's office he created the: State Security Service (SSS), National Intelligence Agency (NIA) and Defence Intelligence Agency (DIA).

== Presidency ==
Shortly after coming to power General Babangida established the Nigerian Political Bureau of 1986. The bureau was inaugurated to conduct a national debate on the political future of Nigeria, and was charged amongst other things to:

Review Nigeria's political history and identify the basic problems which have led to our failure in the past and suggest ways of resolving and coping with these problems.

The exercise was the broadest political consultation conducted in Nigerian history.

Between 1983 and 1985, the country suffered an economic crisis. In 1986, Babangida launched the Structural Adjustment Program (SAP), with support from the International Monetary Fund (IMF) and the World Bank, to restructure the Nigerian economy. In 1987, Babangida launched the Mass Mobilization for Self Reliance, Social Justice and Economic Recovery (MAMSER), following a recommendation from the Political Bureau, to increase self-reliance and economic recovery. The policies involved in the SAP and MAMSER were:

- deregulation of the agricultural sector to include the abolition of marketing boards and elimination of price controls
- privatisation of public enterprises
- devaluation of the Nigerian naira to improve the competitiveness of the export sector
- relaxation of restraints on foreign investment put in place by the Gowon and Obasanjo governments during the 1970s.
- re-orient Nigerians to shun waste and vanity, promoting economic recovery
- shed all pretences of affluence in their lifestyle, promoting self-reliance
- propagate the need to eschew all vices in public life, including corruption, dishonesty, electoral and census malpractices, ethnic and religious bigotry, promoting social justice

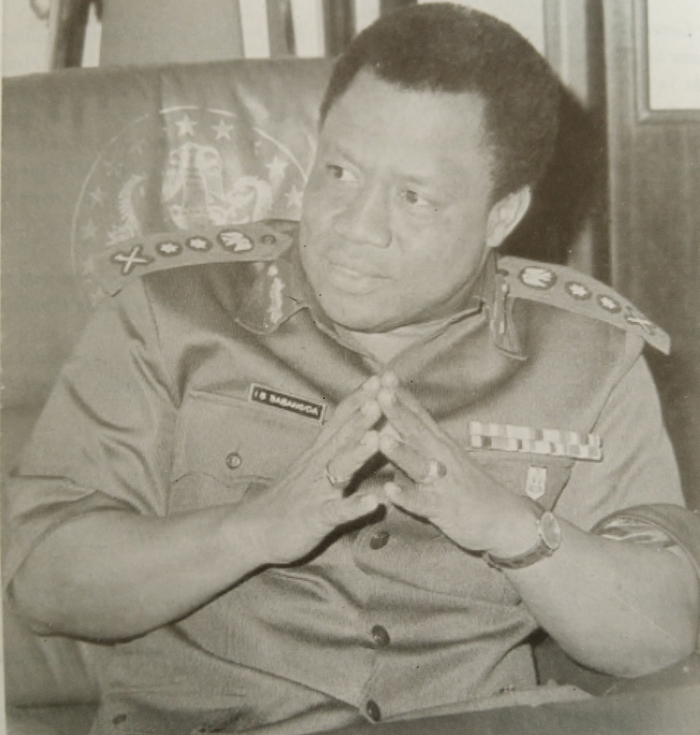
Babangida in uniform

Between 1986 and 1988, these policies were executed as intended by the IMF, and the Nigerian economy actually did grow as had been hoped, with the export sector performing especially well. But falling real wages in the public sector and among the urban classes, along with a drastic reduction in expenditure on public services, set off waves of rioting and other manifestations of discontent that made a sustained commitment to the SAP difficult to maintain.

Babangida contributed to the development of national infrastructure. He finished the construction of the Third Mainland Bridge, the largest bridge on the continent at the time. His administration also saw the completion of the dualising of the Kaduna-Kano highway. Babangida also completed the Shiroro Hydroelectric Power Station. He had the Toja Bridge in Kebbi constructed. He also created the Jibia Water Treatment Plant and the Challawa Cenga Dam in Kano. Babangida also founded the Federal Road Safety Corps in order to better manage the national roads. On 23 September 1987, Babangida created two states: Akwa Ibom State and Katsina State. On 27 August 1991, Babangida created nine more states: Abia, Enugu, Delta, Jigawa, Kebbi, Osun, Kogi, Taraba, and Yobe, bringing the total number of states in Nigeria to thirty in 1991. Babangida also increased the share of oil royalties and rents to states of origin from 1.5 to 3 percent. Babangida and his Ministers of the Federal Capital Territory led by Mamman Vatsa, Hamza Abdullahi and later General Gado Nasko, led the regime's relocation of the seat of government from Lagos to Abuja on 12 December 1991.

Babangida strengthened the foreign relations of Nigeria. He rejected apartheid in South Africa, involved Nigerian troops in the Liberian Civil War, hosted the Abuja Treaty which gave rise to the African Union and enhanced relations with the United States and the United Kingdom. In 1986, Nigeria joined the Organisation of Islamic Cooperation an international organisation considered the "collective voice of the Muslim world". This move was welcomed in Northern Nigeria, where there is a Muslim majority population. However, non-Muslims criticised the move likening it to an Islamisation agenda of Nigeria, a secular country. Babangida's then second-in-command Commodore Ebitu Okoh Ukiwe, opposed the decision to join the Islamic organization and was removed as Chief of General Staff. Close to the end of his tenure, he paid a state visit to the queen of the United Kingdom making him the second Nigerian leader after Yakubu Gowon to do so.

=== Crisis of the Third Republic ===
In 1989, Babangida started making plans for the transition to the Third Nigerian Republic. He legalized the formation of political parties and formed the two-party system with the Social Democratic Party (SDP) and National Republican Convention (NRC) ahead of the 1992 general elections. He urged all Nigerians to join either of the parties, which the late Chief Bola Ige famously referred to as "two leper hands". The two-party state had been a Political Bureau recommendation. In November 1991, after a census was conducted, the National Electoral Commission (NEC) announced on 24 January 1992 that both legislative elections to a bicameral National Assembly and a presidential election would be held later that year. A process of voting was adopted, referred to as Option A4. This process advocated that any candidate needed to pass through adoption for all elective positions from the local government, state government, and federal government.

The 1992 parliamentary election went ahead as planned, with the Social Democratic Party (SDP) winning majorities in both houses of the National Assembly, but on 7 August 1992, the NEC annulled the first round of 1992 presidential primaries. Babangida annulled the 7 August presidential primaries which Shehu Yar'Adua emerged as the SDP presidential candidate and Adamu Ciroma as the NRC candidate order to get rid of the old guard in both parties. In January 1993, Babangida rejigged the ruling military junta – the AFRC – replacing it with the National Defence and Security Council, as the supreme decision-making organ of the regime. He also appointed Ernest Shonekan Head of the Transitional Council and de jure Head of Government. At the time, the transitional council was designed to be the final phase leading to a scheduled handover to an elected democratic leader in the slated 1993 presidential election.

On 12 June 1993, the presidential election was finally held. The results though not officially declared by the National Electoral Commission – showed the duo of Moshood Abiola and Babagana Kingibe of the Social Democratic Party (SDP) defeated Bashir Tofa and Slyvester Ugoh of the National Republican Convention (NRC) by over 2.3 million votes in the 1993 presidential election. The elections were later annulled by military head of state General Babangida, citing electoral irregularities. The annulment led to widespread protests and political unrest in Abiola's stronghold of the South West, as many felt Babangida had ulterior motives, and did not want to cede power to Moshood Abiola, a Yoruba businessman. Babangida later admitted that the elections were annulled due to national security considerations, which he didn't specify.

The lingering 12 June crisis led to the resignation of General Babangida in August 1993. Babangida signed a decree establishing the Interim National Government led by Ernest Shonekan. As interim president, Shonekan initially appointed Abiola as his vice president, who refused to recognize the interim government, the crisis lingered for months culminating in the seizure of power by General Sani Abacha. Babangida at the height of the crisis stated "If I am sleeping and I hear the Yorubas beating the drums of war, I would go back to sleep."

== Post presidency ==
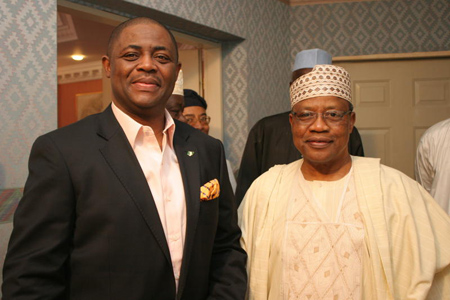
Babangida (right) with Femi Fani-Kayode (left) in Lagos (2010)

From his hilltop residence in Minna, Babangida cultivated a patronage system which cut across the entire country. In 1998, Babangida was instrumental in the transition to democracy. Babangida is one of the founders of the Peoples Democratic Party alongside other prominent military generals such as Aliyu Mohammed Gusau. They were said to have supported General Olusegun Obasanjo in the 1999 Nigerian presidential election in order to springboard themselves back to power.

In August 2006, Babangida announced that he would run in the 2007 Nigerian presidential election. He said he was doing so "under the banner of the Nigerian people" and accused the country's political elite of fuelling Nigeria's current ethnic and religious violence. On 8 November 2006, General Babangida picked up a nomination form from the Peoples Democratic Party headquarters in Abuja. This effectively put to rest any speculation about his ambitions to run for the Presidency. His form was personally issued to him by the PDP chairman, Ahmadu Ali. This action immediately drew extreme reactions of support or opposition from the southwest. In December, just before the presidential primaries, it was widely reported in Nigerian newspapers that Babangida had withdrawn his candidacy. In a letter excerpted in the media, IBB is quoted as citing the "moral dilemma" of running against Umaru Yar'Adua, the younger brother of the late General Shehu Yar'Adua, as well as against General Aliyu Mohammed Gusau, given IBB's close relationship with the latter two. It is widely believed that his chances of winning were slim.

In September 2010, Babangida officially declared his intention to run for the presidency in the 2011 presidential election in Abuja, Nigeria. Babangida was later urged by his military inner circle to withdraw his candidacy after the October 2010 Abuja bombing. President Goodluck Jonathan later emerged as the PDP presidential candidate and throughout his presidency sought counsel from Babangida and his military inner circle.

In 2015, following the election of his long-time rival General Muhammadu Buhari as president, Babangida maintained a low profile. In 2017, Babangida had corrective surgery. He is considered a foremost elder statesman, and has called for a generational shift in leadership to allow for a new crop of leaders to replace the 1966 military class.

Speaking during the release of his biography on 20 February 2025, Babangida finally expressed regret for cancelling the 1993 elections, declaring that the elections had been free and fair, and that MKO Abiola indeed won.

"Undoubtedly credible, free and fair elections were held on 12 June 1993. ... However, the tragic irony of history remains that the administration that devised a near-perfect electoral system and conducted those near-perfect elections could not complete the process. ... That accident of history is most regrettable. The nation is entitled to expect my expression of regret."

== Personal life ==
A biopic titled Badamasi: Portrait of a General which chronicled his early life, life during the Nigerian Civil War as well as his time as the military head of state was produced by Obi Emelonye and released in cinemas on 12 June 2020.

=== Family ===
Babangida was married to Maryam Babangida from 1969 until her death in 2009. They had four children together; Aisha, Muhammad, Aminu, and Halima. On 27 December 2009, Maryam Babangida died from complications of ovarian cancer.

=== Public image ===
Babaginda once described himself as an "evil genius", a nickname that stuck. Historian Toyin Falola described him as "affable and cunning, he was a master of double-speak, deceit, and ambiguity." He was also nicknamed "Maradona" for his "ability to outwit potential opponents and dictate the terms of the political game" and because "his political deviousness was reminiscent of the legendary Argentine soccer star's skilful dribbling."

=== Personal wealth ===
Babangida is rumoured to be worth over US$5 billion. He is believed to secretly possess a multi-billion dollar fortune via successive ownership of stakes in a number of Nigerian companies.

Magazine Forbes assumed in 2011 that shortly before the First Gulf War Babangida channelled US$12 billion of unplanned profits ("oil windfall") into his own pocket (the oil price jumped from US$15/barrel to US$41.15/barrel within weeks in 1990 and then crashed almost as quickly to the old value). Investigations into this did not lead to any concrete results. A critical remark is that the additional profit of US$12 billion calculated by Forbes could only have been realised if Nigeria had sold the entire annual production volume of 630 million barrels exactly on 27 September 1990 at the annual peak price of US$41/barrel − instead of the officially stated US$22/barrel average during the whole year. This is unlikely in view of the long-term supply contracts in the oil business and the sluggishness of the state-owned oil company NNPC. Babangida commented in 2022 on the above allegations that he and his staff had been "saints".

== Honours ==
=== Military ranks ===
During his military career, Babangida attained the following ranks:

Year	Insignia	Rank
1963		Second Lieutenant
1966		Lieutenant
1968		Captain
1970		Major
1970		Lieutenant Colonel
1973		Colonel
1979		Brigadier General
1983		Major General
1987		General

=== National honours ===
Year	Country	Decoration	Presenter	Notes
1983	Nigeria	Commander of the Order of the Federal Republic (CFR);	Shehu Shagari	Third highest national honour in Nigeria
	Nigeria	Defence Service Medal (DSM);	Nigerian Army	Military award
	Nigeria	Forces Services Star (FSS);	Nigerian Army	Military award
	Nigeria	General Service Medal (GSM);	Nigerian Army	Military award
	Nigeria	National Service Medal (NSM);	Nigerian Army	Military award
1985	Nigeria	Grand Commander of the Order of the Federal Republic (GCFR);	Himself	Highest national honour in Nigeria

=== Foreign honours ===
Year	Country	Decoration	Presenter	Notes
1988	Yugoslavia	Order of the Yugoslav Great Star	Raif Dizdarević	Highest decoration of Yugoslavia
1989	United Kingdom	Honorary Knight Grand Cross of the Order of the Bath (GCB) Military division;	Elizabeth II	Fourth-most senior of the British Orders of Chivalry
1989	Zimbabwe	Freedom of the City of Harare	Robert Mugabe	Prestigious national honour in Zimbabwe
1990	Equatorial Guinea	Grand Collar of the Order of the Independence	Teodoro Obiang Nguema Mbasogo	Highest national honour in Equatorial Guinea

== See also ==
Military offices
Preceded by Mohammed Inuwa Wushishi	Chief of the Army Staff; 1984–1985	Succeeded by Sani Abacha
Preceded by Muhammadu Buhari	President of the Armed Forces Ruling Council of Nigeria; 17 August 1985 – 26 August 1993	Succeeded by Ernest Shonekan
