= Mustapha Amin =

Nigerian airforce officer and statesman

Mustapha A. Amin

Governor, Borno State, Nigeria
- In office March 1976 – July 1978
- Preceded by: Muhammadu Buhari (North-Eastern State)
- Succeeded by: Tunde Idiagbon

Personal details
- Died: 5 May 2013 Kaduna State, Nigeria

Group Captain Mustapha A. Amin was the first governor of Borno State, Nigeria from March 1976 to July 1978 during the military regime of General Olusegun Obasanjo, after that state had been formed when North-Eastern State was divided into Bauchi, Borno, and Gongola states.

Amin was a Group Captain in the Nigerian Airforce when appointed governor by the supreme military council. In an attempt to stop desert encroachment, he imposed restriction on tree cutting permits and made it an offence to set fires to clear the land. He called for establishment on an inland port to serve Lake Chad.
