= 1992 Nigerian parliamentary election =

Parliamentary elections were held in Nigeria on 4 July 1992, the first time since the 1983 military coup. Only two parties were allowed to contest the elections, which resulted in a victory for the Social Democratic Party, which won 52 of the 91 Senate seats and 314 of the 593 House seats, despite the National Republican Convention receiving more votes. Voter turnout was only 25%.

== Results ==
=== Senate ===
Party	Votes	%	Seats
National Republican Convention	8,309,548	52.58	37
Social Democratic Party	7,494,228	47.42	52
Vacant			2
Total	15,803,776	100.00	91
Registered voters/turnout	38,866,336	–	
Source: Nohlen et al.

=== House of Representatives ===
Party	Votes	%	Seats
National Republican Convention	8,551,080	50.57	275
Social Democratic Party	8,358,791	49.43	314
Vacant			4
Total	16,909,871	100.00	593
Registered voters/turnout	38,866,336	–	
Source: Nohlen et al.
