= War Against Indiscipline =

Nigerian mass mobilization program

The War Against Indiscipline was a mass mobilization program in Nigeria, organized by the Muhammadu Buhari military administration with the aim of correcting social maladjustment. The program began in March 1984 and was in effect until September 1985. It was broader in scope than previous measures; it aimed to attack social maladjustment and widespread corruption. By July 1985, newspapers such as Concord and The Guardian that were critical of corruption and mismanagement of the economy in the previous administration began panning the WAI campaign and accusing military officials of engaging in abusive practices under the cover of fighting indiscipline. Others viewed the measure as an exhortation from the military command at the top to the people below.

== Background ==
The War Against Indiscipline was announced in March 1984 by Tunde Idiagbon, the Chief of Staff, Supreme Headquarters and the launch event was held at Tafawa Balewa Square to much fanfare. The military government of which Idiagbon was a member had seized power on 31 December 1983, and a key underlying reason given for the coup was unprecedented, rampant corruption and indiscipline within the political class. Prior to the coup, newspapers wrote articles alleging corrupt practices within the Shehu Shagari administration, including fraud in the housing ministry and external communications agency, bribes given to Central Bank officials to obtain foreign currency, and government-supported hoarding of rice. Government officials and the political class lived in luxury, while the civilian administration began a policy of austerity. Support for a coup that would correct the excesses of political class was growing. When the military took control of the government, they established measures to impose order and discipline within the country. One of those measures was the War Against Indiscipline, a comprehensive program to correct many social ills that the new military ruling class perceived to afflict Nigeria. Earlier corrective measures were specific in scope; for instance, public unity schools with student population from all over the country were founded in different states to promote a national feeling, the National Youth Service Corps had a goal to serve a similar purpose, and Operation Feed the Nation was established to promote self sufficiency.

== War Against Indiscipline ==
Acknowledging that indiscipline and degeneracy within the political class had climbed unprecedented heights, the War Against Indiscipline, a comprehensive and controlled corrective measure was announced. The primary goals of the measure were to strengthen national unity, promote economic self sufficiency and instill cultural, personal, and moral discipline so as to control indolence, corruption, and criminal practices. The military government showed commitment to the success of the plan; decrees were announced that imposed harsh punishments for crimes and vagrancy.

=== Administration ===
The organizational structure of the program had federal and state level committees. Each state managed its own program and made monthly reports about its progress. The Ministry of Information was in charge of the administration at the federal level, within the ministry was a WAI department headed by a director, and this department was advised by a central WAI committee. The program was launched in schedules and meant to be continuous. Advertising and the media were used as constant means of promoting its tenets.

=== Phases ===
==== I: Orderliness ====
The first phase was launched on the same day as the program. The phase concerned the desire of the government to instill orderliness and respect for fellow Nigerians. Instead of chaotic boarding of buses or jumping lines, Nigerians were told to queue and to wait their turn. At some locations, uniformed men were present to enforce queuing. But this had vocal critics, who felt that it was a simple attempt to cure a deeper problem caused by scarcity in the major cities. Controlling queues when serious food shortages existed was seen as failing to meet the needs of the people. In addition, it was defined as a national malaise, even though most towns and rural areas were not as chaotic and disorderly as the urban areas.

==== II: Work ethic ====
In television advertisements to promote phase two, contrasting scenarios were created such as an office worker doing her nails while the phone rang and another worker quietly asleep during office hours. These situations were contrasted with a hardworking baggage handler and an efficient traffic control officer. The phase was appropriately launched on May 1 as an attempt to manage truancy, lateness, laziness and to improve work ethic and productivity.

==== III: National unity ====
Launched on August 27, 1984, phase III was designed to promote genuine national unity. Nigerians were asked to forgo statism and tribal affiliations and instead to be open minded in making decisions. Practices that raised cultural consciousness in clothing, food and everyday purchases were also a major target of phase III. Nigerians were asked to appreciate national symbols such as the national anthem and the flag. This phase led to the ubiquitous presence of the national flag in public offices and the singing of the national anthem in schools. However, like the program in general, critics attacked the measure because those failing to recite the national anthem were given unusual punishments, such as civil servants being suspended without pay, while public policies like federal character and out of state school fees were still in effect.

==== IV: Corruption and criminal activities ====
Phase IV was launched in January 1985 and was a measure to tackle specific criminal activities such as oil bunkering, pipeline tampering, smuggling, fraud, counterfeit currency, and drug peddling.

==== V: War against filth ====
This phase was launched with the goal of cleaning private and public environment. It included a sanitation program to clear refuse and illegal structures. The phase earned many critics as a result of the displacement of street hawkers and vendors. The War Against Indiscipline was initiated during a period of economic downturn when people were struggling to earn money; the displacement derailed street vendors' means of employment. An austere economic policy initiated by the government gave legitimacy to critics who view the administration as similar to the previous one, not understanding the depth of the country's social and economic problems.

=== WAI brigade ===
Previous measures were ad-hoc steps limited in scope, but a similar measure was establishment towards the end of 1983. This measure, called 'ethical revolution', was viewed more as a propaganda weapon, and when the government announced WAI, it was originally met with skepticism. The military government took steps to demonstrate its commitment to structural reform of social maladjustment and corruption. Initially uniformed men played both supervisory and enforcement roles of the tenets of WAI, but with criticism of the lack of input from the community, in order to give a civilian face to the enforcement of the War Against Indiscipline, the WAI brigade was launched. There were three levels of WAI: the first were primary school students called the Vanguard, the second were secondary school students called the Crusaders, and the third were those above the age of eighteen years who were called Patriots.
