= 1985 Nigerian coup d'état =

Coup against Pres. Buhari; Ibrahim Babangida installed

Date	August 27, 1985
Location	Nigeria
Result	Coup succeeds.: Muhammadu Buhari is ousted by the Chief of Army Staff Ibrahim Babangida.

Belligerents
Military government: Supreme Military Council (SMC)	Armed Forces faction: Armed Forces Ruling Council (AFRC)

Commanders and leaders
Muhammadu Buhari	Ibrahim Babangida

The 1985 Nigerian coup d'état was a military coup which took place in Nigeria on 27 August 1985 when a faction of mid-level Armed Forces officers, led by the Chief of Army Staff Major-General Ibrahim Babangida, overthrew the government of Major General Muhammadu Buhari (who himself took power in the 1983 coup d'état). Buhari was then detained in Benin City until 1988.

Babangida justified the coup by saying that Buhari failed to deal with the country's economic problems by implementing Buharism, and promised "to rejuvenate the economy ravaged by decades of government mismanagement and corruption". Babangida then replaced the ruling Supreme Military Council (SMC) with a new Armed Forces Ruling Council (AFRC), which lasted until 1993. The regime survived a coup attempt in 1986 and 1990.

According to Larry Diamond, "Buhari's fall from grace was due primarily to his anti-democratic behavior; regionalism, factionalism and economic woe also contributed to his demise."

== See also ==
- Military coups in Nigeria
