= Supreme Military Council of Nigeria (1983–1985) =

Supreme Military Council

Overview
- Established: 31 December 1983
- Dissolved: 27 August 1985
- State: Nigeria
- Leader: Chairman (Muhammadu Buhari)
- Headquarters: Lagos

The Supreme Military Council was the body that ruled Nigeria after the 1983 Nigerian coup d'état. Its chairman, Muhammadu Buhari, was the head of state. It lasted until the 1985 Nigerian coup d'état, when Ibrahim Babangida replaced the body with a new Armed Forces Ruling Council (which lasted until 1993).

A previous Supreme Military Council was established by Yakubu Gowon and ruled Nigeria from 1966–1979 until the Second Nigerian Republic.

== Members ==
Name	Role (Rank)
Muhammadu Buhari	Chairman / Head of State (Maj.-Gen.)
Babatunde Idiagbon	Chief of Staff (Maj.-Gen.)
Domkat Yah Bali	Minister of Defence (Maj.-Gen.)
Ibrahim Babangida	Chief of Army Staff (Maj.-Gen.)
Augustus Aikhomu	Chief of Naval Staff (Commodore)
Ibrahim Alfa	Chief of Air Staff (Air-Vice Marshal)
Mamman Jiya Vatsa	Minister for Federal Capital Territory Abuja, (Maj.-Gen.)
Mohammed Magoro	Minister of Internal Affairs (Maj.-Gen.)
Sanni Abacha	General Officer Commanding, 2nd Mechanized Division (Maj.-Gen.)
Joseph Olayeni Oni	General Officer Commanding, 1st Mechanized Division (Brig.)
Muhammad Gado Nasko	Commander, Nigeria Army Corps of Artillery (Maj.-Gen.)
Yohanna Yerima Kure	General Officer Commanding 82nd Division (Brig.)
Salihu Ibrahim	General Officer Commanding 3rd Armored Division (Col.)
Okoh Ebitu Ukiwe	Flag Officer Commanding, Western Naval Command (Capt.)
Larry Koinyan	Representative, Nigeria Air Force (Air Cdre.)
Grey Eronmosele Longe	Secretary of Federal Military Government and Head of the Civil Service
Chike Offodile	Attorney General
Mohammed Lawal Rafindadi	Director General of the National Security Organization
James Etim Okon lnyang	Inspector-General of Police

== Sources ==
- "Nigeria 1984: An Interim Report", CSIS Africa Notes, Georgetown University Centre for Strategic and International Studies, 24 (February 29, 1984)
- The Europa World Year Book 1985, Volume II, p. 2322
