= Gideon Orkar =

Nigerian coup leader (1952–1990)

Major Gideon Gwaza Orkar (4 October 1952 – 27 July 1990) was a Nigerian military officer who staged an attempted violent coup against the government of General Ibrahim Babangida on 22 April 1990. Orkar and his conspirators seized the FRCN radio station, various military posts around Lagos and the Dodan Barracks, Lagos, the military headquarters and presidential Villa. Babangida was present when the barracks were attacked but managed to escape by a back route.

In his coup address, Orkar called for the excision of five northern states. However, the coup was crushed by the Babangida regime and Orkar including 41 other co-conspirators were tried, convicted of treason and were executed.

== Background and education ==
Gideon Orkar was the 9th child born to the family of Levi Orkar Chi, a teacher of Tiv heritage in Apir village of Makurdi Local Government in Benue State. He attended primary schools at the village of Apir and Wadata. He also attended Boys Secondary School, Gindiri, Plateau State, and while taking Higher School Certificate classes, he responded to an army advertisement and joined the Nigerian Army in 1972 as cadet no 682. He started his officer cadet training at the Nigerian Defence Academy, Kaduna with the 12th Regular Combatant Course. He was commissioned in December 1974 in the rank of Second Lieutenant and posted to the Nigerian Army Armoured Corps School in Ibadan.

== Military career ==
Orkar was part of the peacekeeping contingent in Chad in 1978. He served in various units including the Reece at Kaduna, 82, Div, Enugu, and Armoured School, Bauchi. In 1986, he attended the senior Officers Course 9 at the Command and Staff College, Jaji. He also served as commander of Saki 22 Armoured Battalion in Oyo State. His last posting prior to the April 1990 coup was as a member of the Directing Staff of the Command and Staff College, Jaji.

== Death ==
Major Orkar and 41 other conspirators were convicted of treason and executed by firing squad on 27 July 1990 by the government of General Ibrahim Babangida.
