= Armed Forces Ruling Council (Nigeria) =

Legal armed force council in charge during 1985 to 1993 in Nigeria

Overview
- Established: 27 August 1985
- Dissolved: 26 August 1993
- State: Nigeria
- Leader: Chairman (Ibrahim Babangida)
- Headquarters: Lagos

Nigeria's Armed Forces Ruling Council was established by Ibrahim Babangida following the 1985 Nigerian coup d'état that overthrew Muhammadu Buhari. It replaced Buhari's Supreme Military Council, which had been in place since the 1983 Nigerian coup d'état.

== Initial membership ==
Name	Position
Major-General Ibrahim Babangida	President, Chairman of the Armed Forces Ruling Council, Chairman of the Federal Executive Council, Commander in Chief – Nigerian Armed Forces
Commodore Ebitu Ukiwe	Chief of General Staff
Major-General Domkat Bali	Defence Minister and Chairman of the Joint Chiefs of Staff
Maj-Gen Sani Abacha	Chief of Army Staff
Air Vice Marshal Ibrahim Mahmud Alfa	Chief of Air Staff
Rear-Admiral Augustus Aikhomu	Chief of Naval Staff
Major-General Mamman Jiya Vatsa	Minister of the Federal Capital Territory
Etim Inyang	Inspector-General of Police
Brigadier Peter Adomokhai	GOC, 1 Mechanised Infantry Division – Kaduna
Brigadier Yohanna Yerima Kure	GOC, 2 Mechanised Division – Ibadan
Brigadier Joshua Nimyel Dogonyaro	GOC, 3 Armoured Infantry Division – Jos
Brigadier Donaldson Oladipo Diya	GOC, 82 Division – Enugu
Brigadier Gado Nasko	Commander - Nigerian Army Corps of Artillery
Brigadier Duro Ajayi	Commander, Training and Doctrine Command
Brigadier Paul Omu	Commandant, Command and Staff College
Brigadier Joseph Olayeni Oni	Director - Joint Services
Brigadier Abdullahi Mamman	Director of Army Training and Operations
Commodore Aloko	Flag Officer Commanding, Eastern Naval Command
Commodore Murtala Nyako	Flag Officer Commanding, Western Naval Command
Commodore Mauftau Adegoke Babatunde Elegbede	Flag Officer Commanding, Sea Training Command
Air Vice Marshal Muhammadu Yahaya	Air officer Commanding – Air Training Command
Air Commodore Bayo Lawal	Air Officer Commanding, Tactical Air Command
Air Commodore Nura Imam	Air Officer Commanding, Logistics Command
Air Commodore Larry Koinyan	Air Force
Lt-Col John Shagaya	Commander, 9 Mechanised Brigade
Lt-Col Halilu Akilu	Director-General, Directorate of Military Intelligence
Lt-Col Raji Alagbe Rasaki	Commander, Army Headquarters Garrison and Signal Group
Lt-Col Tanko Ayuba	Commander – Corps of Signals

Of these initial members, only five (Abacha, Dogonyaro, Aikhomu, Nyako and Elegbede) were still members when Babangida stepped down in 1993.
