= Tunde Idiagbon =

De facto deputy head of state of Nigeria from 1983 to 1985

Major General Tunde Idiagbon

6th Chief of Staff, Supreme Headquarters
- In office 31 December 1983 – 27 August 1985
- Head of State: Muhammadu Buhari
- Preceded by: Alex Ekwueme as civilian Vice President of Nigeria
- Succeeded by: Ebitu Ukiwe

Governor of Borno State
- In office July 1978 – October 1979
- Preceded by: Mustapha Amin
- Succeeded by: Mohammed Goni

Personal details
- Born: 14 September 1943 Ilorin, Northern Region, British Nigeria (now Ilorin, Kwara State, Nigeria)
- Died: 24 March 1999 (aged 55) Ilorin, Kwara, Nigeria
- Party: None (military)
- Spouse: Biodun Idiagbon
- Education: Nigerian Military School; Pakistan Military Academy; Nigerian Defence Academy; Naval Postgraduate School

Military service
- Allegiance: Nigeria
- Branch/service: Nigerian Army
- Years of service: 1962–1985
- Rank: Major general
- Battles/wars: Nigerian Civil War

Babatunde "Tunde" Abdulbaki Idiagbon (14 September 1943 – 24 March 1999) was a Nigerian general who served as the 6th Chief of Staff, Supreme Headquarters (second-in-command) under military head of state General Muhammadu Buhari from 1983 to 1985.

He was also a prominent member of Nigeria's military governments between 1966 and 1979, serving as a military administrator of Borno State under General Olusegun Obasanjo's military government.

== Early life ==
Idiagbon was born into the family of his father Hassan Dogo who is of Fulani ancestry and mother Ayisatu Iyabeji Hassan Idiagbon on 14 September 1943 in Ilorin, Kwara State. He attended United Primary School, Ilorin from 1950 to 1952 and Okesuna Senior Primary School, Ilorin, 1953–57. He received his secondary education at the Nigeria Military School between 1958 and 1962.

== Military career ==
In 1962, Idiagbon joined the Nigerian Army by enrolling in the Nigerian Military Training College (NMTC). In February 1964, the college was renamed the Nigerian Defence Academy (NDA).

From 1962 to 1965, Idiagbon attended the Pakistan Military Academy, Kakul (PMA Kakul), Abbottabad, Pakistan, where he obtained a bachelor's degree in economics. Upon arrival to Nigeria from Pakistan he was commissioned second lieutenant in April 1965. He was company commander, 4th Battalion from August 1965 to February 1966. In 1966 he studied for the junior commander course at the Nigerian Defence Academy, Kaduna. From 1966 to 1967 he also served as an intelligence officer, 4th Battalion and General Staff Officer, 3rd Intelligence, 1st Sector. He was promoted to the rank of lieutenant in 1966. He fought in the Nigerian Civil War and was made commanding officer, 20 Battalion from October 1967 to February 1968. In 1968, he was promoted to the rank of captain. He was the commanding officer, 125 Battalion, from 1968 to 1970 - a dreaded fighting unit.

In 1970, he was promoted to the rank of major. He was made brigade major and deputy commander, 33 Brigade from March 1970 to March 1971 and the commander, 29 Brigade from March 1971 to December 1972. In January 1973 he served as the general staff officer, Grade 1 and later, principal staff officer (PSO), Supreme Military Headquarters. He was promoted to lieutenant colonel in 1974. He was made brigade commander, 31 and 15 Brigades from August 1975 to August 1978. In 1976, Idiagbon proceeded to the Command and Staff College in Quetta, Pakistan, for further military training. In July 1978 he was promoted to the rank of colonel. He was appointed as the director of manpower (manning) and planning, Army Headquarters in October 1979.

In May 1980 he was promoted to the rank of brigadier-general. In 1981, he attended the National Institute for Policy and Strategic Studies, Kuru, Jos, Plateau state, Nigeria and in 1982 he attended the International Defence Management Course, Naval Postgraduate School, US. He was the military secretary of the Nigerian Army from 1981 to 1983.

== Military administrator of Borno State ==
From August 1978 to October 1979, the military Head of State, General Obasanjo appointed Idiagbon as the military administrator (position now called governor) of Borno State, Nigeria.

== Chief of Staff, Supreme Headquarters ==
General Muhammadu Buhari made Idiagbon his second-in-command as Chief of Staff, Supreme Headquarters from 31 December 1983 to 27 August 1985. Described as a thorough military man, he played a key role as the hallmark of Buhari's military government. Idiagbon was promoted to the rank of major-general in 1985.

He controlled all visible instruments of national, political, governmental and administrative powers. Idiagbon was responsible for introducing, announcing and implementing many of the government's major policies, they include:

=== War Against Indiscipline ===
The five phases of the War Against Indiscipline which Idiagbon announced and implemented were:

- Phase One - Queuing, launched on 20 March 1984
- Phase Two - Work Ethics, launched on 1 May 1984
- Phase Three - Nationalism and Patriotism, launched on 21 August 1984
- Phase Four - Anti-Corruption and Economic Sabotage, launched on 14 May 1985
- Phase Five - Environmental Sanitation, launched on 29 July 1985

=== Currency change and currency exchange rate policy ===
In April 1984, Idiagbon announced the introduction of a new currency for Nigeria. He said the new currency would keep the same name, but the colors of bills would be different.

He also announced limits to currency exchange for corporations and individuals. The individual limit was $7,000. He said any corporation or individual exchanging in excess of the limit had to explain where the money came from and needed government clearance.

According to Idiagbon the major cause of the nation's economic problems "is the deliberate sabotage of the Nigerian currency through large-scale illegal trafficking of the currency".

=== Import substitution industrialisation policy ===
In 1984, Idiagbon implemented the military government's import substitution industrialisation policy based on the use of local materials. Importation was tightened. The aim was to ensure the growth of local industries through the policy.

=== Go Back to Land Programme ===
Also in 1984, Idiagbon spearheaded and implemented the Go Back to Land Programme which was part of the government's farming policy that encouraged massive agricultural food production and was also part of the military government's poverty alleviation strategy.

=== Foreign policy ===
From January 1984 to August 1985, Idiagbon took control of all foreign policy matters that involved security. He was in control of the border closure, expulsion of illegal immigrants, and damage control after the Umaru Dikko Affair in Britain.

He also participated in diplomatic activities. On behalf of Nigeria's military government, he signed credit line and educational cooperation agreements with a visiting Bulgarian delegation led by Prime Minister Grisha Filipov in 1984. He led a delegation in 1984 to the Soviet Union to meet Soviet leader Konstantin Chernenko.

== 1985 military coup d'état ==
After 20 months in power, the military government of Buhari was overthrown by Ibrahim Babangida on 27 August 1985. Idiagbon was removed from his position as chief of staff, Supreme Headquarters, and he was placed under house arrest for three years, after his release he retired to his hometown Ilorin and lived in relative obscurity.

== Personal life ==
On 6 March 1970, Idiagbon married Biodun Idiagbon (née Gamra). They had two sons and three daughters together: Adekunle, Junior, Ronke, Mope and Bola. On 24 March 1999, Idiagbon died under very suspicious circumstances.

== Awards ==
Major-General Idiagbon (Rtd.) received several awards and medals. In alphabetical order they include:

- Defence Service Medal (DSM)
- Forces Service Star (FSS)
- General Service Medal (GSM)
- National Service Medal (NSM)
