= 1975 Nigerian coup d'état =

1975 coup in Nigeria against General Yakubu Gowon

Date	July 29, 1975
Location	Nigeria
Result	Coup succeeds.: Yakubu Gowon is ousted and replaced with Murtala Mohammed.

Belligerents
(Nigeria) Military government: Supreme Military Council (SMC)	Armed Forces faction: Supreme Military Council (SMC)

Commanders and leaders
Yakubu Gowon	Joseph Nanven Garba; Murtala Mohammed; Olusegun Obasanjo

The 1975 Nigerian coup d'état was a bloodless military coup which took place in Nigeria on 29 July 1975 when a faction of junior Armed Forces officers overthrew General Yakubu Gowon (who himself took power in the 1966 counter-coup). Colonel Joseph Nanven Garba announced the coup in a broadcast on Radio Nigeria (which became FRCN in 1978). At the time of the coup, Gowon was attending the 12th Organisation of African Unity (OAU) Summit in Kampala, Uganda. The coup plotters appointed Brigadier Murtala Mohammed as head of state, and Brigadier Olusegun Obasanjo as his deputy. The coup was motivated by unhappiness of junior officers at the lack of progress Gowon had made in moving the country towards democratic rule, while Garba's role as an insider is credited with ensuring that the coup was bloodless.

Mohammed, whose policies and decisiveness won him broad popular support and elevated him to the status of a folk hero, stayed in power until 13 February 1976 when he was assassinated during a coup attempt. Obasanjo succeeded him as head of state.
