= Gado Nasko =

Nigerian military officer and politician

Lieutenant general Muhammad Gado Nasko

Governor of Sokoto State
- In office July 1978 – October 1979
- Preceded by: Colonel Umaru Mohammed
- Succeeded by: Shehu Kangiwa

Minister FCT Abuja
- In office 1989–1993
- Preceded by: Hamza Abdullahi
- Succeeded by: Jeremiah Timbut Useni

Personal details
- Born: 20 June 1941 (age 85) Nasko, Magama LGA, Niger State

Military service
- Allegiance: Nigeria
- Branch/service: Nigerian Army
- Years of service: 1962–1993
- Rank: Lieutenant general

Muhammad Gado Nasko (born 20 June 1941) is a Nigerian statesman and retired lieutenant general who served as the military governor of Sokoto State from 1978 and 1979. He also served as Minister of Trade, Agriculture, and Water Resources from 1985 to 1989, and as Minister for the Federal Capital Territory, Abuja, from 1989 to 1993.

== Early life and education ==
Nasko was born on 20 June 1941 in Nasko town, in present-day Niger State. He attended Native Authority Junior Primary School, Ibeto, from 1947 to 1954, and Kontagora Senior Primary School from 1955 to 1956. He then proceeded to Provisional Secondary School (now Government College), Bida, in 1957 and graduated in 1962.

== Career timeline ==
Gado Nasko's career timeline proceeded as follows:

- Nigerian Military Training College: 1962-1963
- School of Artillery, Larkhill: 1963-1964
- Commissioned Officer, Corps of Artillery: July 1964
- Commandant of the School of Artillery: 1969-1975
- Commander 2nd Artillery Brigade: 1975-1976
- Military Secretary: 1976-1978
- Military Governor of Sokoto State: 1978-1979
- Commandant 1st Divisional Artillery: 1979-1980
- Commandant Corps of Artillery: 1980-1985
- Minister of Trade, Agriculture and Water Resources: 1985-1989
- Minister for the Federal Capital Territory, Abuja: 1989-1993

== Later life ==
Nasko retired from the army in 1993, after Sani Abacha took over as head of state from Ernest Shonekan. He was at the time a lieutenant general and retired to his village home in Nasko, Niger State, quietly to a life as a farmer and community leader. In 2006, he was conferred with the national honour of Commander of the Order of the Niger (CON) by President Olusegun Obasanjo and recognised as one of the most respected statesmen in Nigeria. The former Gado Nasko Barracks, now Lungi Barracks, in the nation's capital, Abuja, was named after him.

== Personal life ==
Nasko is married and has children and grandchildren.
