= Jilli massacre =

Airstrike in Yobe State, Nigeria

Coordinates: 12°36′49″N 12°27′59″E

- Part of the Boko Haram insurgency
- Location: Jilli, Yobe State, Nigeria
- Date: 11 April 2026
- Target: Boko Haram militants
- Attack type: Airstrike
- Deaths: 56–200+
- Injuries: 23+
- Perpetrator: Nigerian Air Force
- Motive: Accidental

On 11 April 2026, the market in Jilli, Yobe State, Nigeria was accidentally struck by a Nigerian Air Force airstrike while pursuing Boko Haram militants under Operation Hadin Kai. As many as 200 people were killed, although the number of civilians and militants killed is unknown. Nigerian and international media have called the incident a massacre.

== Background ==
Misfires are common in Nigeria, where the military often conducts air raids to battle armed groups who control vast forest enclaves. Air raids have killed at least 500 civilians since 2017, according to an Associated Press tally of reported deaths. Security analysts point to loopholes in intelligence gathering as well as insufficient coordination between ground troops, air assets and stakeholders.

The market where the strike occurred, located in the town of Jilli near the Borno State-Yobe State border, is known to be often patronized by Boko Haram militants who come there to buy food supplies.

== Airstrike ==
Nigerian Air Force jets accidentally struck Jilli, a large, remote village market at nighttime while pursuing militants. Survivors said that the market was packed with civilians at the time of the attack.

== Victims ==
Three residents and an official from an international humanitarian agency confirmed the strike and said over 200 people were killed while other reports vary. Local sources reported over 40 civilians were killed. Human rights organization Amnesty International said that over 100 people may have been killed, citing witness accounts. The councillor of Fichiram Ward, Malam Lawan Zannah, confirmed the incident, stating that he had verified the number of casualties at about 200. He also said that 23 injured victims were treated in Geidam.

== Investigation ==
The Nigerian Air Force, responding to reports of civilian casualties, said in a statement it had activated its Civilian Harm Accident and Investigation Cell "to immediately proceed to the location on a fact-finding mission on the allegation".

== See also ==
- Gidan Sama and Rumtuwa airstrike
- Kwatar Daban Masara airstrike
- Rann bombing
- Tudun Biri drone strike
