= List of equipment of the Nigerian Air Force =

This is a list of equipment currently in service with the Nigerian Air Force, as well as some of the formerly used equipment.

== Aircraft ==
Aircraft	Photo	Origin	Type	Variant	In service	Notes
Combat aircraft
JF-17 Thunder		China/Pakistan	Multirole	JF-17 Block II	3	
Chengdu J-7		China	Fighter	F-7 FT-7Ni	5 1	Used as a conversion trainer. One crashed on 29th October 2025.
Alpha Jet		France	Attack	A/E	13	8 of original 24 active 12 newly delivered units(6 operationalized, 6 reserved for spare parts) 1 crashed on 12/06/2025.
M-346 Master		Italy	Light Combat	M-346FA		24 on order
Super Tucano		Brazil	COIN	A-29B	12	
Special Mission
ATR 42		France	Maritime patrol	MPA	1	1 crashed in October 2026.
Cessna CitationJet		United States	Maritime patrol/ISR	CJ3	2	
Beechcraft Super King Air		United States	ISR	360ER	4	
Diamond Aircraft		Austria	ISR	DA42 MPP DA62 MPP	1 4	
Transport
Airbus A330		France	VIP	A330-243	1	Official presidential jet.
Dornier 228		Germany	Transport		6	
Lockheed C-130		United States	Transport	C-130H	3	
EADS CASA C-295		Spain	Transport	C-295W		3 on order
Dassault Falcon 7X		France	VIP		2	
Gulfstream G550		United States	VIP		1	
Helicopters
AgustaWestland AW189		Italy	VIP		2	Presidential Helicopter
AgustaWestland AW139		Italy	VIP		3	One was handed over by the Rivers State Government in March 2025
AgustaWestland AW109		Italy	Utility/Attack	A109E ALUH	18	7 on order
AgustaWestland AW109		Italy	Utility/Attack	Trekker B	18	7 on order
Airbus H125		Europe	Utility/ISR	H-125M	2	Delivered October 2026
Airbus H225		Europe	Transport/Utility			1 on order
Bell 412		United States	Utility/Transport	412EP	2	
Eurocopter AS332		France	Utility		5	
Eurocopter EC135		France	Utility	EC135 T2+	3	
Mil Mi-17		Russia	Transport	Mi-171	6	1 crashed in August 2023
Bell AH-1Z Viper		United States	Attack			12 on order
Mil Mi-24		Russia	Attack	Mi-35	15	
TAI T129		Turkey	Attack	T129B	6	6 on order
Trainer
PAC MFI-17 Mushshak		Pakistan	Basic Trainer	MFI-395	8	
Aermacchi MB-339		Italy	Jet Trainer	MB-339AN	6	
Aero L-39		Czechoslovakia	Jet Trainer	L-39ZA	11	
Robinson R66		United States	Rotorcraft Trainer		4	
UAVs
TAI Aksungur		Turkey	UCAV			12 on order
CAIG Wing Loong II		China	UCAV		5	
CASC Rainbow		China	UCAV	CASC CH-3A CASC CH-4B	3 3	
CASC Rainbow		China	UCAV	CH-4D		2x CH-4D on order
Yabhon Flash-20		United Arab Emirates	UCAV		2	
Tsaigumi		Nigeria	UAV			6 on order

== Aircraft munitions ==
Name	Photo	Origin	Type	Notes
Air to air missiles
PL-5		China	Short range air-to-air missile	
PL-9C		China	Short range air-to-air missile	
Air to ground missiles
AGM-65 Maverick		United States	Air-to-surface missile	
AR-1		China	Laser Guided Missile	
9M120 Ataka-V		Russia	Anti-Tank Guided Missile	
UMTAS		Turkey	Anti-Tank Missile	
APKWS		United States	Laser Guided Rocket	
Cirit		Turkey	Laser Guided Rocket	Supplied to the Nigerian Air Force alongside TAI T129 ATAK
Hydra 70		United States	Unguided Rocket	
TL2		China	Laser-Guided Missile	
AG-300M		China	Laser-Guided Missile	
General purpose bomb
GBU-12 Paveway II		United States	Laser Guided Bomb	
GBU-58 Paveway II		United States	Laser Guided Bomb	
Mark 81		United States	Unguided Bomb	
Mark 82		United States	Unguided Bomb	
FT-5		China	Guided bomb	
LS‑6		China	Guided bomb	
YC-200		China	Guided bomb	

== Pod ==
Name	Origin	Type	In service	Notes
Targeting Pod
ASELPOD	Turkey	Targeting pod	U/N	Used by JF-17 Thunders of the Nigerian Air Force.

== Radar ==
Name	Photo	Origin	Type	In service	Notes
Radar
36D6 Tin Shield		Soviet Union	Ground based radar	U/N	
RPA 200MC 3D		Argentina	Ground based radar	1 (8+ on order)	The Air Force uses the radar as a secondary user

== Retired aircraft ==
Aircraft	Photo	Origin	Type	Variant	In service	Notes
Aircraft
Dornier Do 28		Germany	utility	Dornier 128	11	Likely retired from service of the Nigerian Air Force
Aeritalia G.222		Italy	transport		1	
