= Akwanaja massacre =

- Location: Akwanaja, Nasarawa State, Nigeria
- Date: January 23, 2023
- Target: "Terrorists" (per Nigerian Air Force); Fulani herdsmen
- Deaths: 40
- Injuries: Unknown
- Perpetrator: Nigerian Air Force

On January 23, 2023, a Nigerian Air Force airstrike in Akwanaja, Nasarawa State, Nigeria killed forty herders. The airstrike was the third deadly airstrike by Nigerian forces since December 2022, after the Tudun Biri drone strike on December 3 that killed over 120 and the Mutumji airstrike shortly after that killed 64.

== Background ==
Conflicts between herders and farmers in Nasarawa State have been ongoing for decades, and the Nigerian military has often intervened to protect areas from bandit attacks or kidnappings. Since 2017, the Nigerian military has used air warfare like airstrikes and drone strikes to counteract these bandit groups, although a lack of collaboration with local intelligence and between government security agencies has killed 400 people in drone strikes since the start of the campaign.

On December 3, 2022, a Nigerian drone strike on civilians celebrating Mawlid killed over 120 in Tudun Biri, and on December 27 another drone strike in Mutumji killed 64.

== Airstrike ==
Shortly before the airstrike in Akwanaja, Nigerian authorities seized over a thousand cows owned by Fulani herders on the borders of Benue and Nasarawa states. The dispute was settled peacefully, with the herders paying a fine to retrieve their cows. A group of herders set off in the night to retrieve their cows from Makurdi, where they were being held, in order to return them to their hometown by morning. In the middle of the night near the village of Akwanaja, survivors reported hearing a loud explosion and a noise from the sky. At least 40 people were killed, and the site was a dusty mess with survivors ad wounded screaming for help.

Nigerian authorities did not initially comment on the airstrike, despite calls from Nigerian organizations and the Fulbe Global Development and Rights Initiative (FGDRI). Because the Nigerian government didn't respond, conspiracy theories that Benue authorities called in the airstrike gained popularity in Fulani communities.

== Aftermath and reactions ==
Following the airstrike, a deal between the United States and Nigeria granting the Nigerian army AH-1Z Vipers came under scrutiny from American congresspeople Sara Jacobs, Jim Risch, and Chris Smith. The three urged the deal to be postponed until the Nigerian military reassessed their tactics to prevent civilian casualties.

The Nigerian Air Force formally apologized for the massacre on May 17, the first time in its history. Air Marshal Hasan Abubakar met with the victims' families. However a year after the massacre, Amnesty International stated that there was still no justice for the victims.
