= Nurudeen Balogun =

Nigerian Air Force officer

Nurudeen Abiodun Balogun
- Military career
- Allegiance: Nigeria
- Branch: Nigerian Air Force
- Rank: Air Vice Marshal
- Commands: Air Officer Commanding, Training Command; Air Officer Commanding, Tactical Air Command; Chief of Training and Operations

Air Vice Marshal Nurudeen Abiodun Balogun (born 14 April 1964), is a senior officer of the Nigerian Air Force who has served in several command and staff appointments, including as Air Officer Commanding (AOC) of the Training Command, Kaduna, Air Officer Commanding Tactical Air Command, Makurdi, Chief of Training and Operations at the Nigerian Air Force Headquarters and Chief of Defence Policy and Plans (CDPP),.

== Early life and education ==
Nurudeen Abiodun Balogun was born on 14 April 1964 in Fiditi, Afijio Local Government Area of Oyo State, Nigeria. He attended Saint Louis Primary School, Kano, between 1969 and 1976 before proceeding to Federal Government College, Kano, where he completed his secondary education in 1981.

In 1982, he was admitted into the Nigerian Defence Academy as a member of the 31st Regular Combatant Course. He graduated in 1985 and was commissioned into the Nigerian Air Force as a Pilot Officer.

== Military career ==
Balogun received his basic pilot training at the 301 Flying Training School and later qualified as an instructor pilot at the 303 Flying Training School. Following his flying training, he was type-rated on the Alpha Jet, serving as a fighter pilot and instructor.

During his career, he held several operational and administrative appointments, including Administrative Officer at the Operational Services Wing, 99 Air Combat Training Group, Kainji; Staff Officer Grade II Administration; Acting Commanding Officer, Base Services Wing; Operations Officer, Nigerian Air Force Detachment, Lungi, Sierra Leone; Commanding Officer, Fighter Wing, NAF Detachment, Lungi; Staff Officer Grade I Operations at 303 Flying Training School, Kano; and Chief Instructor at the Basic Flying Training School, Kano.

He later served as Air Officer Commanding, Training Command, Kaduna, assuming office in 2016 following a reshuffle in the Nigerian Air Force.

In 2017, Balogun was appointed Air Officer Commanding Tactical Air Command, Makurdi. During his tenure, he oversaw air operations supporting counter-insurgency efforts in northeastern Nigeria before being redeployed to the Nigerian Air Force Headquarters as Chief of Training and Operations.

== See also ==
- Nigerian Air Force
- Nigerian Defence Academy
