= 403 Flying Training School, Kano =

Nigerian Air Force flying training school in Kano

403 Flying Training School
- Active: 1967–present
- Country: Nigeria
- Branch: Nigerian Air Force
- Type: Flying training school
- Role: Basic and instructor pilot training
- Part of: Air Training Command
- Garrison/HQ: Nigerian Air Force Base Kano

Aircraft flown
- Trainer: Aero L-39ZA Albatros

403 Flying Training School (403 FTS) is a jet pilot training institution of the Nigerian Air Force located in Kano, Kano State, Nigeria. The school is one of the Nigerian Air Force's principal flying training establishments and is responsible for advanced flying instruction and the training and conversion of fighter pilots for operational duties.

== History ==
The school was established as part of the Nigerian Air Force's pilot training system to provide advanced jet flying instruction after the basic flying phase. It operates under the Nigerian Air Force's Air Training Command and has played an important role in the development of military aviation personnel in Nigeria.

Over the years, 403 Flying Training School has trained fighter pilots who have subsequently been posted to operational squadrons of the Nigerian Air Force. The institution contributes to strengthening the operational readiness of the service through advanced flight instruction.

== Training and operations ==
403 Flying Training School provides advanced jet flying and fighter conversion training for Nigerian Air Force pilots. The curriculum includes advanced aircraft handling, navigation, instrument flying, formation flying, tactical missions, and weapons delivery training before pilots are deployed to frontline operational units.

The school operates the Aero L-39ZA Albatros advanced jet trainer for pilot instruction. In 2019, the Nigerian Air Force restored three L-39ZA aircraft to service through collaboration with the aircraft manufacturer, improving the school's pilot training capacity.

== Graduations ==
In November 2017, the school graduated four fighter pilots after the completion of Jet Flying Course 1. The graduation formed part of the Nigerian Air Force's efforts to expand its pool of operational fighter pilots.

In August 2018, during the graduation ceremony of Basic Flying Course 18 at the school, the Chief of the Air Staff announced that the Nigerian Air Force had trained more than 90 operational pilots within three years as part of its modernization programme.

In November 2023, the school winged twelve new combat pilots during the graduation of Basic Flying Course 20, increasing the Nigerian Air Force's operational pilot strength.

== See also ==
- Nigerian Air Force
- Aero L-39 Albatros
