= Dornier Aviation Nigeria =

Nigerian airline

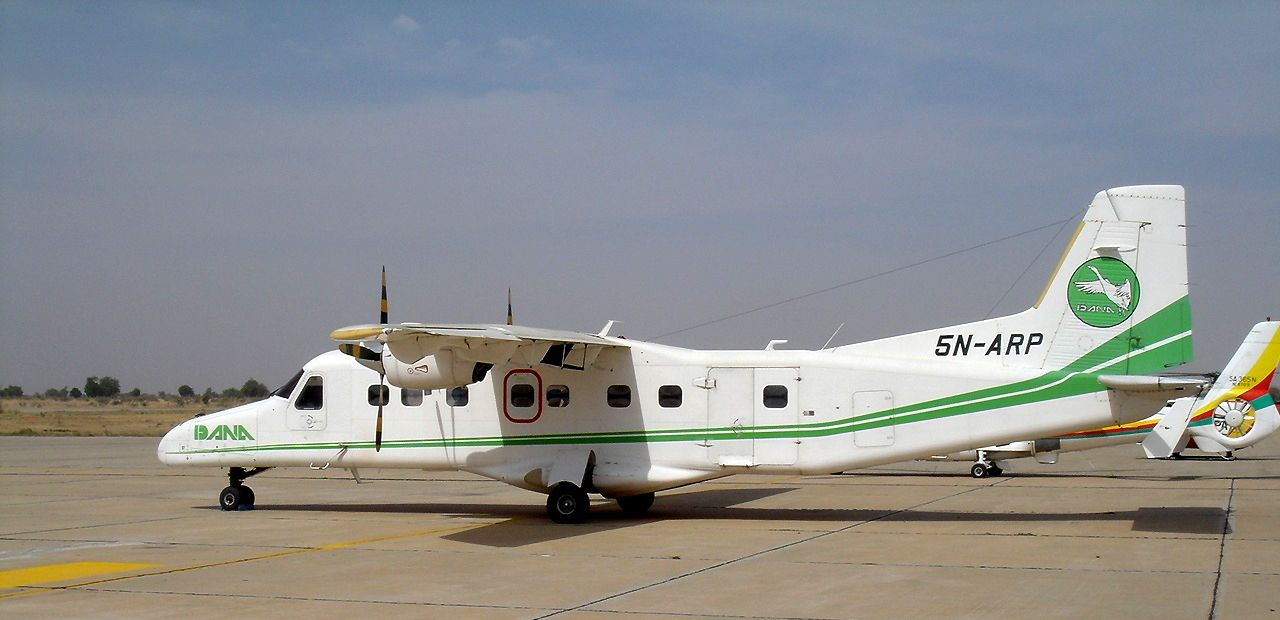
IATA	ICAO	Call sign
-	DAV	DANA AIR
- Founded: 1979
- Hubs: Old Kaduna Airport
- Fleet size: 7
- Parent company: Dornier Aviation Nigeria AIEP Limited
- Headquarters: Kaduna, Nigeria
- Key people: Col. Sani Bello; Babangida Inuwa; Hamid Bawa
- Website: dananig.aero

Dornier Aviation Nigeria is an airline based in Kaduna, Nigeria. It operates Dornier aircraft in Nigeria on a charter basis, as well as running a fixed-base and maintenance operation. It also undertakes agricultural flying, aerial photography and emergency medical evacuation services. Its main base is Old Kaduna Airport. Dornier Aviation Nigeria also participated in the 2015 Hajj airlift led by the National Hajj Commission of Nigeria, the airlift was financed by Nigerian Businessman Babangida Inuwa.

== History ==
It was established in 1979 and has 207 employees (at March 2007).

The Nigerian government set a deadline of April 30, 2007 for all airlines operating in the country to re-capitalise or be grounded, in an effort to ensure better services and safety. The airline satisfied the Nigerian Civil Aviation Authority (NCAA)’s criteria in terms of re-capitalization and was re-registered for operation.

== Destinations ==
Dornier Aviation Nigeria operates no scheduled services.

== Fleet ==
=== Current fleet ===
As of August 2025, Dornier Aviation Nigeria operates the following aircraft:

Dornier Aviation Nigeria fleet
Aircraft	In service	Orders	Passengers	Notes
Beechcraft 1900D	1	—		
De Havilland Canada DHC-8-Q400	1	—		
Dornier 328-100	5	—		
Total	7	0		

=== Former fleet ===
The airline fleet previously included the following aircraft (at March 2007):

- 14 Dornier 228-212
