= Tolulope Arotile =

Nigerian military officer (1995–2020)

- Tolulope Arotile
- Born: Tolulope Oluwatoyin Sarah Arotile; 13 December 1995; Kaduna State, Nigeria
- Died: 14 July 2020 (aged 24); Nigerian Airforce Base, Kaduna State
- Education: Nigerian Defence Academy
- Buried: Military Cemetery, Airport Road, Abuja, Nigeria
- Military career
- Allegiance: Nigeria
- Branch: Nigerian Air Force
- Service years: 2012–2020
- Rank: Flying Officer

Flying Officer Tolulope Oluwatoyin Sarah ArotileTolulope_Oluwatoyin_Sarah_Arotile.wav (13 December 1995 – 14 July 2020) was the first-ever female combat helicopter pilot in the Nigerian Air Force.

She contributed significantly to combat operations against the insurgency in the northern states of Nigeria. Arotile died from a head injury sustained in an accident at the Nigerian Air Force base in Kaduna state on 14 July 2020.

== Life ==
Born on 13 December 1995 to Akintunde Arotile (from Iffe in Ijumu Local Government Area of Kogi State) and his wife in Kaduna State. Arotile attended the Air Force Primary School, Kaduna, from 2000 to 2005 and the Air Force Secondary School, Kaduna, from 2005 to 2011, before she gained admission into the Nigerian Defence Academy, Kaduna, as a member of 64 Regular Course on 22 September 2012. Arotile was commissioned into the Nigerian Air Force as a pilot officer on 16 September 2017 and held a Bachelor of Science in mathematics from the Nigerian Defence Academy. She was winged as the first ever female combat helicopter pilot in the Nigerian Air Force on 15 October 2019 (together with the first female fighter pilot, Kafayat Sank) after completing her flying training in South Africa. Two years into her career, Arotile had acquired 460 hours of helicopter flight, which was an outstanding performance for a combat pilot. She saw action against the Boko Haram terrorists, and President Muhammadu Buhari paid tribute to her skill and bravery. In the fight against ISIS, she was called effective, deadly and "fearless".

Arotile held a commercial pilot licence and also underwent tactical flying training on the Agusta 109 Power attack helicopter in Italy.

== Death ==
According to Nigerian Air Force spokesman Ibikunle Daramola, Arotile died on 14 July 2020 as a result of head injuries sustained in a road traffic accident at the Nigerian Air Force Base in Kaduna State, when she was inadvertently hit by the vehicle of a former Air Force Secondary School classmate who was trying to greet her. The way the accident occurred prompted a call for investigation from Nigerians. Others called it "suspicious".

She was buried on 23 July 2020 at the Military Cemetery, Airport Road, Abuja. The Nigerian Air Force revealed that no autopsy was carried out on her before she was buried, because the circumstances surrounding her death were clear, and there were witnesses who were present during the accident. The force said that her family wanted to move on quickly and did not demand an autopsy, noting that the family were comfortable with the force's investigation. The investigation was later transferred to the Nigeria Police Force on 24 July 2020.
