= Yabhon United 40 =

UAE unmanned aerial vehicle

United 40
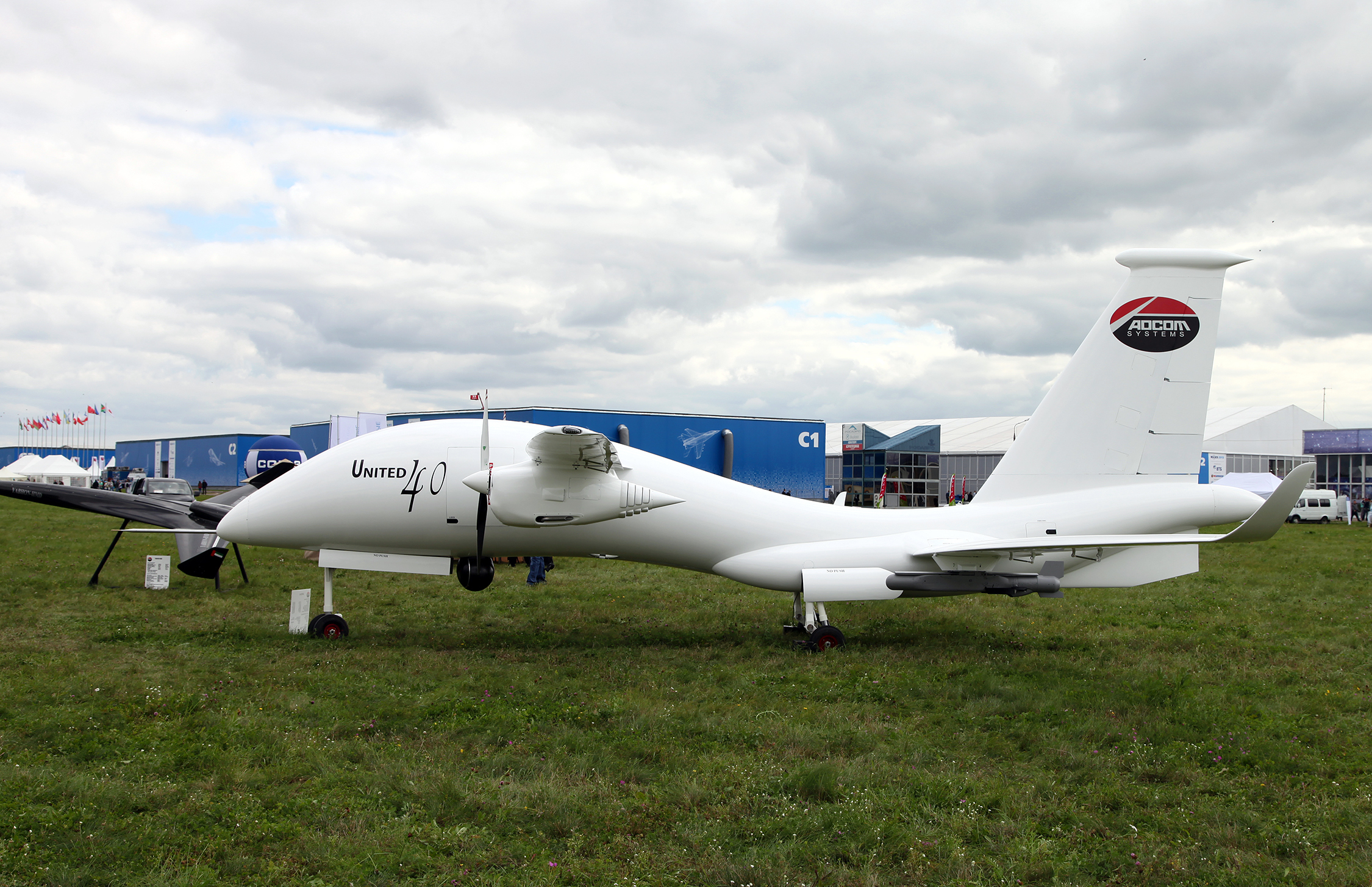
- Yabhon United 40 at Ramenskoy Airport, Russia during the MAKS Airshow 2013

General information
- Type: Unmanned combat aerial vehicle
- National origin: United Arab Emirates
- Manufacturer: Adcom Systems
- Designer: Ali Al Dhaheri
- Primary user: See operators

History
- Introduction date: 2013
- Variant: Yabhon NSR

The Yabhon United 40, also called Yabhon Smart Eye 2, is an unmanned aerial vehicle (UAV) capable of remotely controlled or autonomous flight operations developed by Adcom Systems primarily for the United Arab Emirates Air Force (UAEAF). It functions as a MALE (medium-altitude long-endurance) and can be utilized for special missions, reconnaissance, humanitarian missions, intelligence, or military operations.

== Specifications ==
The Yabhon United 40 can operate at a maximum altitude of 7,000m and can fly for up to 120 hours (5 days). The aircraft is fitted with synthetic aperture radar (SAR), terrain avoidance systems and a gimbaled camera. The Yabhon United 40 can carry 1,050 kg on its four under-wings and has a 6-unit rotating dispenser for propulsion Rotax 914UL mounted in the fuselage.

== History ==
The Yabhon United 40 was unveiled in 2013 Dubai Air Show. It was named United 40 to mark 40 years of the United Arab Emirates formation.

== Operators ==
- Algeria - Renamed as Algeria 54. At least 10 in development. Manufactured locally. 2 in service as of 2019.
- Egypt - Purchased an unknown number from the UAE
- Russia - 2 drones.
- United Arab Emirates

== See also ==
- Adcom Systems
- Orion
