= Gidan Sama and Rumtuwa airstrike =

On 25 December 2024, an airstrike by the Nigerian Armed Forces in Nigeria's northwest Sokoto State killed at least 10 people and injured many others. The military had been targeting the terror group Lakurawa in the villages of Gidan Sama and Rumtuwa, but civilians were caught in the crossfire.

== Background ==
This was not the first time airstrikes by the Nigerian Armed Forces had resulted in civilian casualties. In December 2023, an airstrike in northern Kaduna State killed over 120 people, and in September 2023, another airstrike in Kaduna killed 24 people.

== Response ==
Sokoto's governor, Ahmad Aliyu, launched an investigation into the incident and expressed condolences to the victims' families. He also pledged to provide them with financial and food support.

The incident raised concerns among human rights groups, including Amnesty International, which has called on the Nigerian military to review its procedures and avoid such deadly accidents in the future.
