= Old Kaduna Airport =

- IATA: none; ICAO: none; LID: DN53

Summary
- Airport type: Military
- Location: Kaduna, Nigeria
- Elevation AMSL: 2,126 ft (648 m)
- Coordinates: 10°35′55″N 7°26′55″E

Map
- Location of Airport in Nigeria

Runways
Direction	Length		Surface
Direction	m	ft	Surface
05/23	2,700	8,858	Asphalt
- WAD OurAirports

Old Kaduna Airport is an airport serving Kaduna, the capital of the Kaduna State of Nigeria. Its public uses and airport codes have been transferred to Kaduna International Airport, located 17 kilometres (11 mi) to the northwest.

The Kaduna non-directional beacon (Ident: KD) and VOR-DME (Ident: KUA) are located on the field.

It appears to be the headquarters of the Nigerian Air Force Training Command with a flying training group and a ground training group at the base. The command is chiefly responsible for implementing NAF training policies. Ground training is also provided for support services and technical personnel.

301 Flying Training School, Kaduna
303 Flying Training School, Kano
320 Technical Training Group, Kaduna
325 Ground Training Group, Kaduna

== See also ==
- Transport in Nigeria
- List of airports in Nigeria
