= Tsaigumi =

Nigerian unmanned aerial vehicle

General information
- Type: Unmanned combat aerial vehicle
- National origin: Nigeria
- Manufacturer: Air Force Institute of Technology; UAVision
- Status: In service
- Primary user: Nigerian Air Force

History
- Introduction date: 16 February 2018; 8 years ago

The Tsaigumi (Hausa: Surveillance) is an unmanned aerial vehicle developed for and operated by the Nigerian Air Force. It is one of the first UAVs to be indigenously produced in Nigeria.

Developed by the Air Force Institute of Technology (AFIT) in Nigeria with technical support from the Portuguese UAV company UAVision, the Tsaigumi was officially inducted into service in February 2018 as part of the Nigerian military's broader initiative to develop and deploy homegrown defense technologies.

== History ==
In September 2015, the Nigerian Air Force stated that they were planning to build a new UAV. Later, in 2016, it signed a Memorandum of Understanding (MoU) with Portuguese company UAVision. The word "Tsaigumi" means surveillance in the Hausa language of Nigeria. The designer was reported to be Nkemdilim Anulika Ofodile, an aerospace engineer in the Nigerian Air Force. The Tsaigumi UAV's airframe was built by the 431 Engineering Group of the Nigerian Air Force, with the avionics and telemetry equipment were developed by UAVision of Portugal.

After the drone was inducted into military service as Nigeria's first ever locally built military unmanned aerial vehicle, former President Goodluck Jonathan claimed that the Tsaigumi is actually the same drone as the GULMA, developed by Nigeria in 2013 under his presidency, and hence not the first domestic Nigerian UAV. Air Vice Marshal Olatokunbo Adesanya disputed this, claiming that the GULMA drone "was not operational", and that the Tsaigumi was thus the first completed Nigerian UAV. Also, in 2014, the PR & Information Director of the Nigerian Air Force, Air Commodore Yusuf Anas had said that it was not possible for the Air Force to deploy the GULMA due to difficulties in production. The GULMA is likely to have served as a prototype for the design of Tsaigumi.

== Characteristics ==
The Tsaigumi UAV features a twin-boom design with a pusher propeller configuration. It has a maximum take-off weight of 95 kg. For take-off and landing, it is equipped with tricycle landing gear consisting of two main wheels and a steerable front wheel mounted on the nose of the aircraft.

== Operational history ==
The Tsaigumi was formally inducted into service on February 15, 2018. According to Air Vice Marshal Olatokunbo Adesanya, the Tsaigumi would be used monitoring of disasters, law enforcement, weather forecasting, protecting wildlife, and monitoring Nigeria's exclusive economic zone as well as naval search and rescue operations and maritime patrol.

== Specifications ==
Specifications for the Tsaigumi from African Military Blog.

=== General characteristics ===
- Crew: 3 (mission commander, pilot, navigator)
- Length: 8.6 m (28 ft)
- Wingspan: 6.8 m (22 ft)
- Max takeoff weight: 95 kg
- Powerplant: 128 kW (172 hp)

=== Performance ===
- Maximum speed: 250 km/h (160 mph; 130 kn)
- Mission radius: 100 km (62 mi; 54 nmi)
- Range: 1,000 km (620 mi; 540 nmi)
- Endurance: 10 hours
- Service ceiling: 4,600 m (15,000 ft)
- Operational altitude: 1,500 m (5,000 ft)

=== Armament ===
- No hardpoints specified

=== Avionics ===
- Day/Night EO FLIR
- GPS
- INS
