= Adcom Systems =

Emirati UAV manufacturer

- Type: Private company
- Industry: Aerospace Technology
- Founded: 1991
- Founder: Dr Ali Al Dhaheri
- Headquarters: Mussafah, Abu Dhabi, United Arab Emirates
- Key people: Dr Ali Al Dhaheri, Chief Designer
- Products: Yabhon United 40; Yabhon NSR

Adcom Systems is an Emirati unmanned aerial vehicles manufacturer based in the United Arab Emirates. It is made up of a group of 20 private companies.

== History ==
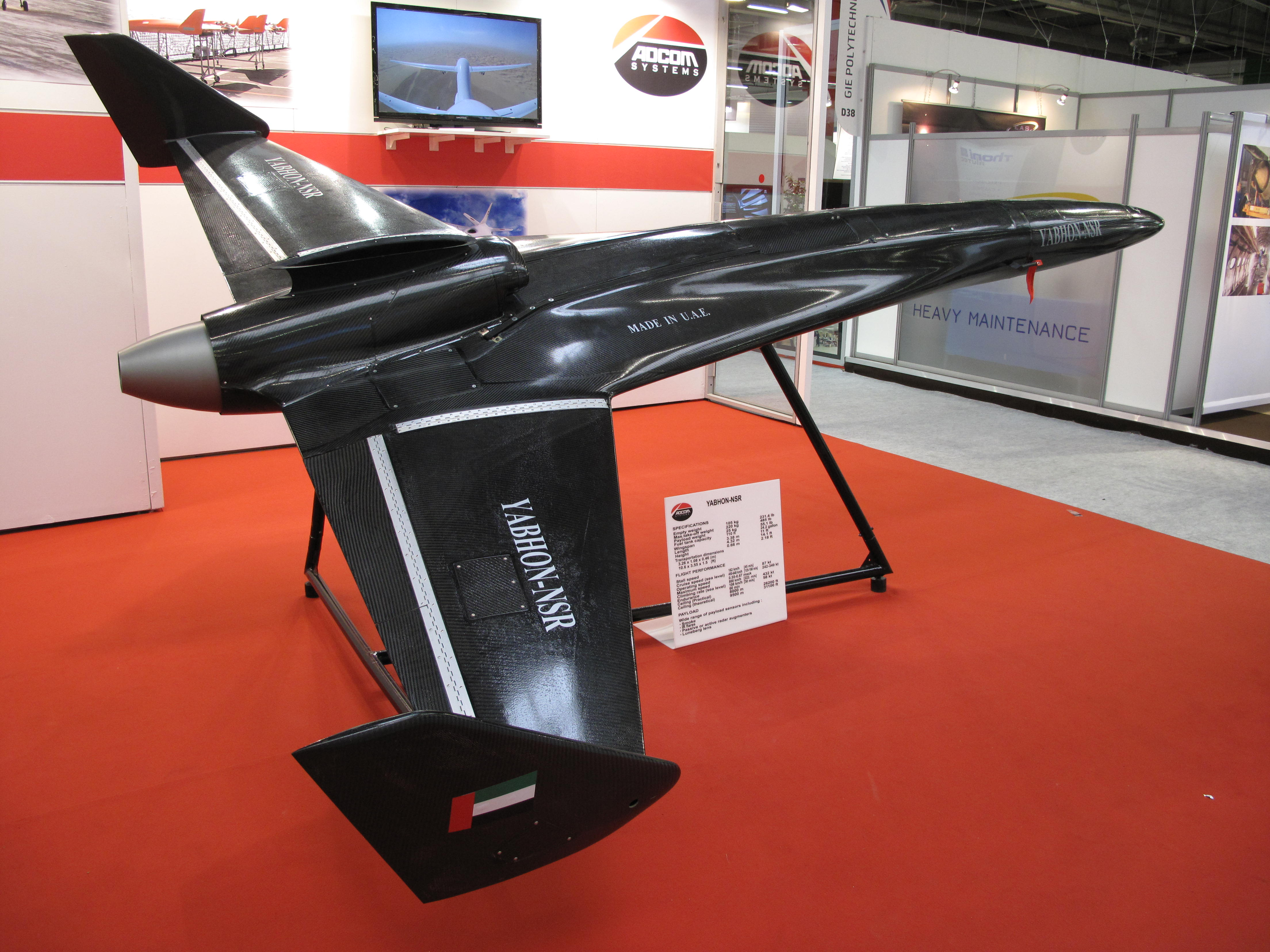
Adcom Yabhon N Series drone at the 2013 Paris Air Show.

Adcom began producing drones as early as 2002 in the United Arab Emirates. The company rose to the challenge of producing unmanned combat aerial vehicle (UCAV) for the United Arab Emirates Air Force as a result of the United States denying the sale of General Atomics MQ-9 Reaper technology.

== Products ==
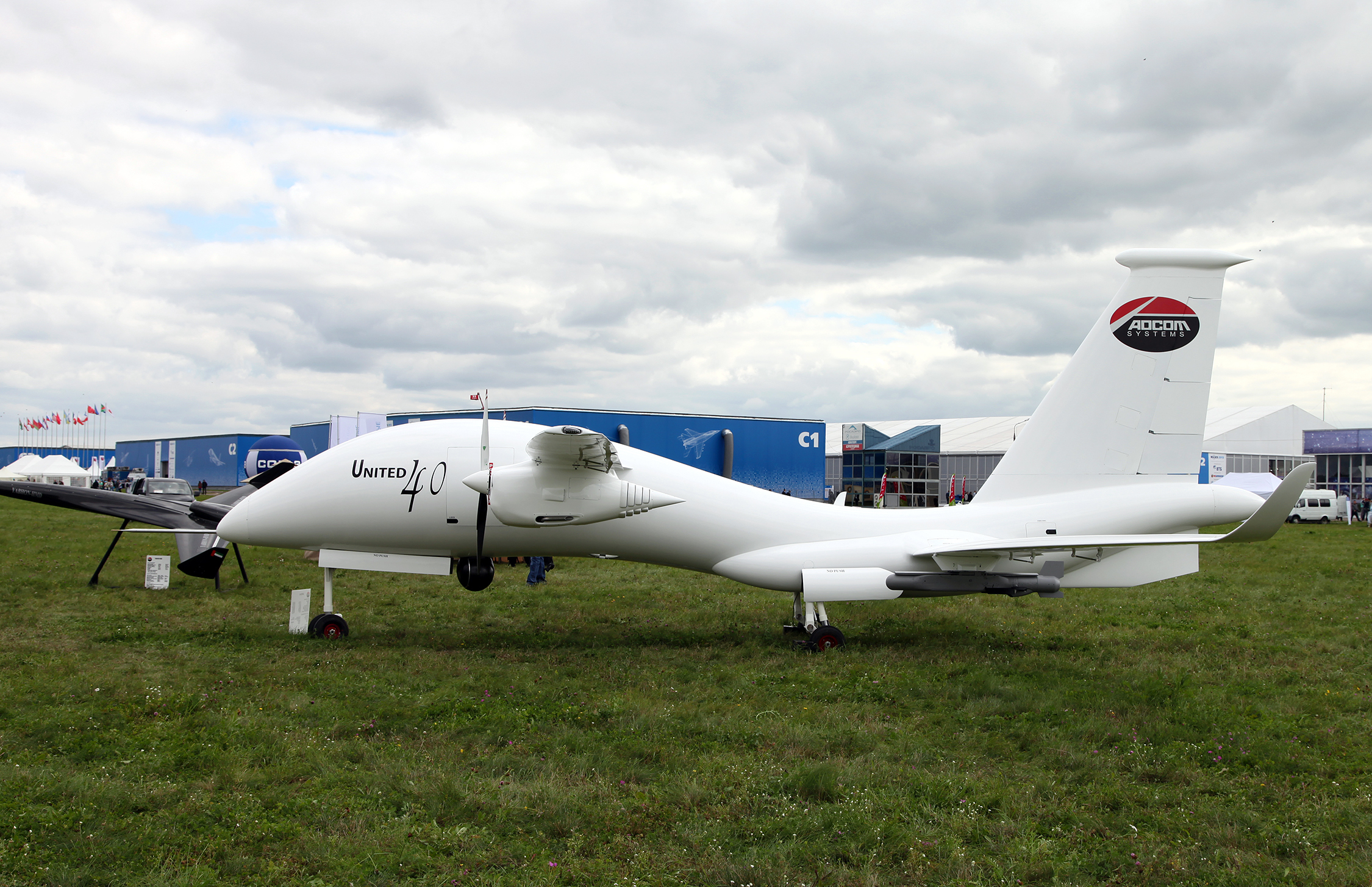
Yabhon United 40 at an airshow in Russia in 2013.

Adcom began as a missile manufacturer before moving on to developing strategic radars and then to UAVs and advanced communication systems. Its main drones are designed to fly at high altitudes and fly for hours while carrying up to 10 missiles. Adcom manufactures a series of drones referred to as Yabhon which includes the Yabhon HALE (high-altitude long-endurance) and Yabhon MALE (medium-altitude long-endurance). Its largest drone is known as the United 40, and is named in honor of the 40th year of the UAE union when the drone was built. It also manufactures the Yabhon NSR which is the first UAV in the world to hunt other UAVs.

=== Unmanned aerial vehicles ===
Name	Length	Wingspan	Ceiling	Endurance	Armament
Yabhon United 40	11.13 m (36.5 ft)	20 m (66 ft)	7,000 m (23,000 ft)	120 HRS 0 MIN	10 PGM
Yabhon Smart Eye	7 m (23 ft)	21 m (69 ft)	7,300 m (24,000 ft)	120 HRS 0 MIN	---
Yabhon R	5 m (16 ft)	6.5 m (21 ft)	6,700 m (22,000 ft)	27 HRS 0 MIN	---

=== Export ===
In 2016, Nigerian military procured Yabhon Flash-20 from the United Arab Emirates.

In December 2018, the Algerian Ministry of Defence revealed it has procured and is operating at least two Yabhon United 40 UAVs and two Yabhon Flash-20 UAVs.
