= Nigerian Air Force =

Air warfare branch of Nigeria's military

- Badge of the Nigerian Air Force
- Founded: 18 April 1964; 62 years ago
- Country: Nigeria
- Allegiance: Federal Republic of Nigeria
- Type: Air force
- Role: Aerial warfare
- Size: approximately 147 aircraft, and 18,000 active personnel
- Part of: Nigerian Armed Forces
- Headquarters: Abuja, F.C.T.
- Motto: "Willing ... Able ... Ready"
- Colours: Green and White
- Anniversaries: Armed Forces Remembrance Day (15 January)
- Equipment: Fighter jets, reconnaissance aircraft, logistics aircraft, attack helicopters, attack drones, surveillance drones, SAM (Air Defense System)
- Engagements: Nigerian Civil War; First Liberian Civil War; Sierra Leone Civil War; Conflict in the Niger Delta; Boko Haram insurgency; Nigerian bandit conflict; Northern Mali War; ECOWAS Intervention in the Gambia; Insurgency in Southeastern Nigeria; 2025 Beninese coup attempt
- Website: www.airforce.mil.ng

Commanders
- Commander-in-Chief: President Bola Tinubu
- Chief of Defence Staff: General Olufemi Oluyede
- Chief of the Air Staff: Air Marshal Sunday Aneke

Insignia
- Roundel

- Fin flash

- Flag

Aircraft flown
- Fighter: JF-17 Thunder, Chengdu J-7, Aermacchi M-346, Alpha Jet, Aero L-39, A-29 Super Tucano
- Helicopter: Mil Mi-24, Bell 412, Mil Mi-17, AW101, AW139, AW109, AS332 Super Puma, EC135
- Attack helicopter: TAI/AgustaWestland T129 ATAK, Mil Mi-35
- Trainer: Alpha Jet, MB 339A, Aero L-39
- Transport: Aeritalia G.222, Dassault Falcon 7X, Gulfstream G550, A330-243, Lockheed C-130 Hercules

The Nigerian Air Force (NAF) is the air branch of the Nigerian Armed Forces. It is the youngest branch of the Nigerian military, established four years after the nation became independent. As at 2021, the air force is one of the largest in Africa, consisting of over 18,000 personnel. Some of its popular aircraft include the Chengdu F-7s, Dassault-Dornier Alpha Jets, JF-17 Thunder, T129 Atak, Agusta Westland 109, Eurocopter EC135 and Embraer EMB 314 Super Tucano.

== Historical events ==
Although an air force was originally proposed in 1958, many lawmakers preferred to rely on the United Kingdom for air defense. But during peacekeeping operations in Congo and Tanganyika, the Nigerian Army had no air transport of its own, and so in 1962, the government began to recruit cadets for pilot training in various foreign countries, with the first ten being taught by the Egyptian Air Force.

=== 1960s ===
The Nigerian Air Force was formally established on 18 April 1964 with the passage of the Air Force Act 1964. The Act stated that the "Nigerian Air Force shall be charged with the defense of the Federal Republic by air, and to give effect thereto, the personnel shall be trained in such duties as in the air as well as on the ground." The NAF was formed with technical assistance from West Germany (now Federal Republic of Germany). The air force started life as a transport unit with the first air crew trained with the Ethiopian Air Force. The second set of cadets underwent training in February 1963 with the Royal Canadian Air Force while some cadets were sent to train with the Indian Air Force.

The head of the German Air Force Assistance Group (GAFAG) was Colonel Gerhard Kahtz, and he became the first commander of the NAF. The nucleus of the NAF was thus established with the formation of the Nigerian Air Force headquarters at the Ministry of Defense.

The NAF did not acquire combat capability until several Mikoyan-Gurevich MiG-17 aircraft were presented by the Soviet Union in support of Nigeria's war effort during the Nigerian Civil War. On 13 August 1967, following several damaging attacks by Biafran aircraft, the USSR started delivering the first MiG-17s from Egypt to Kano IAP, simultaneously sending a large shipment aboard a Polish merchant ship. Initially two MiG-15UTI (NAF601 and NAF 602), and eight MiG-17 (NAF603 to NAF610) were supplied to Nigeria. Later six Il-28 bombers, initially flown upon deployment by Egyptian and Czech pilots, were delivered from Egypt and stationed at Calabar and Port Harcourt.

=== 1970s ===
In July 1971, the International Institute for Strategic Studies estimated that NAF had 7,000 personnel and 32 combat aircraft: six Ilyushin Il-28 medium bombers, eight MiG-17, eight Aero L-29 Delfín jet trainers, and 10 P-149D trainers. Other aircraft included six C-47, 20 Do-27/28, and eight Westland Whirlwind and Alouette II helicopters.

During the 1970s, Nigeria bought Lockheed C-130 Hercules from the United States. Six were acquired at a total cost of $45 million. 25 Mikoyan-Gurevich MiG-21MFs and six MiG-21UM were delivered in 1975 upon the advent of the Murtala-Obasanjo administration that replaced the regime of General Yakubu Gowon. Most of these aircraft were deployed, making the NAF one of the most formidable air forces in Africa during this period.

Jimi Peters wrote: "...the 1975-1980 NAF development plan restructured NAF formations" into group (air force) level units that reported to air force headquarters. That structure, he went on, was found too cumbersome, and thus two intermediate commands (military formations) were formed in 1978: NAF Tactical Air Command and NAF Training Command.

=== 1980s ===
From 1984, 18 SEPECAT Jaguar fighters (13 Jaguar SNs and 5 Jaguar BNs) were delivered and operated from Makurdi. They retired in 1991. Nigeria purchased 24 Aero L-39 Albatros armed jet trainers in 1986–87, having retired its fleet of L-29 that were donated to the Republic of Ghana Air Force at the inception of the West African Monitoring Group (ECOMOG) operations in Liberia. A subsequent attempt to expand the fleet by acquiring 27 more in 1991 was not executed.

=== 2000s ===
In 2005, under the administration of President Olusegun Obasanjo, the Nigerian Parliament appropriated US$251 million to purchase 15 Chengdu F-7 fighter aircraft from China. The deal included 12 F-7NI (NI-Nigeria) single-seat fighter variant, and 3 FT-7NI dual-seat trainer aircraft. The $251 million package included $220 million for 15 aircraft, plus $32 million for armaments: live PL-9C AAM, training PL-9 rounds, unguided rockets, and 250/500 kg bombs. The pioneer NAF pilots on the aircraft trained in China in 2008, while delivery of the aircraft began in 2009. Nigeria had previously considered a $160 million deal to refurbish its fleet of MiG-21s by Aerostar/Elbit Systems, IAI, and RSK MiG. However, it was considered more cost-effective to opt for acquiring the F-7s which were brand new. Nigeria also initiated modification of its variant of the F7, including installing some western equipment and avionics and hence its official designation as "F7-Ni" to reflect that its variant differs in some respects from a typical Chinese F-7. With this acquisition, the fleet of MiG 21s was subsequently retired. The Federal Government of Nigeria under the same dispensation acquired some ATR Maritime Patrol aircraft, built by EADS and Finmeccania / Alenia Aeronautica, boosting the capacity of the service to carry out extensive Intelligence, Surveillance and Reconnaissance (ISR) missions on land and far into the sea.

From September 2009, Nigeria began refurbishing some of its C-130 aircraft beginning with the NAF 917 which it brought back to life with the support of U.S. Air Forces Africa and 118th Airlift Wing. The NAF has subsequently further improved its domestic capacity with the increase in the serviceability of a good number of its transport aircraft.

=== 2010s ===
The NAF designed and built its first indigenous UAV, the "Gulma," which was unveiled by former president Goodluck Jonathan in Kaduna, who said that the "Gulma" would be useful in aerial imaging/mapping, telecommunications, and weather monitoring. According to him, the UAV was rapidly becoming an important tool in news coverage, environmental monitoring, and oil and gas exploration.

On 24 March 2011, the new Air Officer Commanding of NAF Mobility Command, Air Vice Marshal John Aprekuma, explained the rationale behind the establishment of the headquarters of the newly established Air Force Mobility Command in Yenagoa, Bayelsa State as being part of the Federal Government's strategy to protect its socio-economic interest in the Niger Delta, affirming that the presence of the command's headquarters would bring about security and calm to the people of the State.

On 9 December 2011, the Nigerian Air Force commissioned its first female pilot, Blessing Liman, following a directive to the NAF hierarchy by former President Goodluck Jonathan, for the service to start offering flying opportunities to qualified Nigerian female citizens, especially since women had long been flying civil aviation aircraft in the country but did not get a chance to fly in the military.

In March 2014, the Nigerian Government approached Pakistan for the purchase of joint Chinese-Pakistani made CAC/PAC JF-17 Thunder, Block II multi-role fighter aircraft. In December 2015, the Government of President Muhammadu Buhari presented a budget to the National Assembly that included N5bn for three JF-17 aircraft. On 28 March 2018, 'The Diplomat' reported Pakistan as confirming the sale of three JF-17s to Nigeria. In March 2020, NAF Chief of Air Staff announced the delivery schedule of three JF-17 to be affected in November 2020. It is understood that the Buhari administration will expand the fleet of JF-17 fighter aircraft upon an expression of satisfaction by NAF Generals, with the performance of the initial batch procured.

In December 2017, NAF formally announced that the United States of America had agreed to sell the A-29 Super Tucano attack aircraft to Nigeria after the deal had previously stalled.

In November 2018, Sierra Nevada was officially awarded the contract for the 12 Super Tucano aircraft for the NAF, with an estimated completion date by 2024.

On 2 January 2019, one Mi-35M attack helicopter from the Nigerian Air Force helicopter squadron crashed in Damasak, Borno State while providing close-air support for troops of the 145 Battalion combating Boko Haram insurgents, killing all on board. The Mi-35 in the fleet of the NAF is the top-of-the-range model acquired in the life of the administration of President Muhammadu Buhari that had also ordered several Mi-171 and Agusta 109 helicopters from both Mil Moscow Helicopters of Russia and Italy's Leonardo Aerospace for the service.

On 15 October 2019, the NAF winged its first female combat fighter jet pilot, Flight Lieutenant Kafayat Sanni, and its first female combat helicopter pilot Lieutenant Tolulope Arotile. They were amongst thirteen other pilots also winged on the same day.

=== 2020s ===
In April 2020, Embraer reported the completion of the first set of Super Tucanos out of the 12 on order, with an expected full delivery in 2021, bolstering the capacity of the Air Force to engage in counter insurgency interdiction operations (COIN).

On December 7, 2025, at the request of the Beninese government and President Patrice Talon, two A-29 Super Tucano aircraft scrambled from air bases in Lagos and Abuja, flew over Cotonou to suppress a military coup aimed at toppling the government. The jets patrolled the Beninese skies for five hours, executing airstrikes on suspected sites in the capital harboring the coup plotters while ensuring air supremacy. This represented an active effort from an international community such as ECOWAS in guaranteeing peace and stability of its neighbors for strategic purposes

== Structure ==
The Air Force includes a service headquarters, 6 principal staff branches, 4 direct reporting units, and 4 operational commands.

=== Administrative organization ===
The Chief of the Air Staff (CAS) is the principal or lead adviser to the President and also the Minister of Defense and the Chief of Defense Staff, on air-related defense matters. The Nigerian Air Force headquarters is responsible for establishing long and short-term mission objectives and articulating policies, carrying out plans and procedures for the attainment of peace and stability. Also, HQ Nigerian Air Force liaises with the Nigerian Army and Nigerian Navy on joint operational policies and plans. The headquarters Nigerian Air Force consists of the office of the Chief of the Air Staff and 8 staff or branches namely; Policy and Plans Branch, Operations Branch, Air Engineering Branch, Logistics Branch, Administration Branch, Accounts and Budget Branch, Inspections Branch and Air Secretary Branch respectively. Each of these branches is headed by an Air Vice Marshal as branch chief.

=== Air Force structure and organization ===
In 2017, Key Publishing/Air Forces Monthly wrote that NAF commands included:

..two new training commands derived from the now defunct Kaduna-based Training Command – the Air Training Command (ATC) with its HQ at Kaduna and the Ground Training Command (GTC) with its HQ at Enugu; and the Lagos-based Logistics Command. Every command has several subordinate groups, each of which has at least one wing – and each wing includes one or more squadrons. Wings are not always co-located with their parent unit, and while the numerical designations of some flying wings are known, information on current flying squadrons is not openly available.

==== Tactical Air Command ====
Nigerian Air Force Tactical Air Command (TAC), with its headquarters situated at Makurdi, is responsible for interpreting, implementing and controlling Nigerian Air Force operational plans.

- 33 Logistics Group (33 LOG), Makurdi
- 47 Nigerian Air Force Hospital, Yola
- 65 Forward Operations (65 FOB) Badagry
- 101 Air Defense Group (ADG) Nigerian Air Force, Makurdi
- 103 Strike Group (former 75 STG), Yola
- 105 Composite Group (former 79 CG), Maiduguri
- 107 Air Maritime Group (former 81 AMG), Benin
- 115 Special Operations Group (former 97 SOG), Port Harcourt
- 120 Force Protection Group (120 FPG), Makurdi
- 151 Base Service Group (151 BSG), Makurdi
- 161 Nigerian Air Force Hospital, Makurdi
- 407 Air Combat Training Group (former 99 ACTG), Kainji

==== Mobility Command ====
Nigerian Air Force Mobility Command, headquartered at Yenagoa, was established in 2011. It has five other commands located in Lagos, Ilorin, Calabar, Warri and Abuja. The Mobility Command performs tactical and strategic airlift in support of government and military operations.

===== Detachments, Wings, and Forward Operational Bases =====
- Ibadan Forward Operating Base
- Sokoto Forward Operating Base
- 61 Nigerian Air Force Detachment, NAF Warri
- 235 Base Service Group (235 BSG), NAF Yenagoa
- 237 Base Service Group (237 BSG), NAF Minna
- 301 Heavy Airlift Group (301 HAG)/205 Rotary Wing (205 RW), NAF Ikeja, Lagos
- 301 Heavy Airlift Group (301 HAG)/221 Airlift Wing, NAF Ikeja, Lagos
- 303 Medium Airlift Group (303 MAG)/227 Airlift Wing, NAF Ilorin
- 305 Special Mobility Group (305 SMG), NAF Calabar
- 307 Executive Airlift Group (307 EAG), NAF Minna

==== Training Command ====
Nigerian Air Force Training Command, located at Old Kaduna Airport, is chiefly responsible for the training of recruits, ground support crew, and technicians.

- 401 Flying Training School, Kaduna
- 403 Flying Training School, Kano
- 405 Helicopter Group, Enugu
- 407 Air Combat Training Group (former 99 ACTG), Kainji
- 325 Ground Training Centre, Kaduna
- 551 Nigerian Air Force Station, Jos
- 333 Logistics Group (333 BSG), Kaduna
- 453 Base Services Group (453 BSG), Kaduna
- 553 Base Service Group (553 BSG), Enugu
- 455 Base Service Group (455 BSG), Kano
- 461 Air Medical Services Hospital, Kaduna
- 463 Nigerian Air Force Hospital, Jos
- 465 Nigerian Air Force Hospital, Kano
- Aeromedical Centre Project, Kaduna

==== Logistics Command ====
Nigerian Air Force Logistics Command, headquartered at Ikeja, Lagos, is tasked to acquire, maintain and sustain equipment in a state of operational readiness and at a minimum cost consistent with Nigerian Air Force mission requirements.

- 401 Aircraft Maintenance Depot (401 ACMD), Ikeja, within Murtala Mohammed International Airport
- 403 Electronic Maintenance Depot (403 EMD), Shasha
- 405 Central Armament Depot (405 CAD), Makurdi
- 407 Equipment Supply Depot (407 ESD), Nigerian Air Force Ikeja
- 409 International Helicopter Flying School, Enugu.
- 435 Base Service Group (435 BSG), Ikeja
- 445 Nigerian Air Force Hospital, Ikeja

==== Special Operations ====
Nigerian Air Force Special Operations Command (SOC), headquartered at Bauchi, Bauchi State.

- 201 Composite Group, Bauchi, Bauchi State
- 205 Combat Search and Rescue Group, Kerang, Plateau State
- 207 Quick Response Group, Gusau, Zamfara State
- 209 Quick Response Group, Ipetu-Ijesha, Osun State
- 211 Quick Response Group, Owerri, Imo State
- 21 Quick Response Wing, Agatu, Benue State
- 22 Quick Response Wing, Doma, Nasarawa State
- 23 Quick Response Wing, Gembu, Taraba State

==== Presidential Air Fleet ====
The Nigerian Air Force also maintains and is the primary custodian of the air fleet in which the president flies on, as well as other state and foreign dignitaries. The fleet accounts for 10 various fixed wings and rotary aircraft. According to the government, there are 10 aircraft in the fleet. They include two each of AgustaWestland AW189, and Falcon 7X, as well as one each of Bombardier Challenger 605, Boeing Business Jet, Falcon 900, Hawker 4000, Gulfstream G500, and Gulfstream G550. The fleet is situated at the Presidential Wing of the Nnamdi Azikiwe International Airport.

In 2024, an Airbus was acquired for presidential travel. Reported to have cost N150 billion, the 15-year-old plane is said to have an elaborate configuration for VIPs and replaces the president's former plane, a 19-year-old Boeing BBJ 737-700.

== Bases ==
- NAF Abuja - (based within the Nnamdi Azikiwe International Airport, Abuja)
- NAF Benin - Edo State
- NAF Enugu (based within Akanu Ibiam International Airport) - Enugu State
- NAF Ipetu-Ijesha – Osun State
- NAF Jos - Plateau State
- NAF Kaduna is the Old Kaduna Airport - Kaduna State
- NAF Kano (based within Mallam Aminu Kano International Airport) - Kano State
- NAF Maiduguri - Borno State
- NAF Makurdi (based within Makurdi Airport) - Benue State
- NAF Minna (based within Minna Airport) - Niger State
- NAF Port Harcourt - Rivers State
- NAF Kainji - Niger State
- NAF Shasha - Lagos State
- NAF Sam Ethnan Air base - Lagos State
- NAF Yola - Adamawa State
- NAF Katsina - Katsina State
- NAF Mando - Kaduna State
- NAF Unguwan - Kaduna State
- NAF Gombe - Gombe State

== Rank structure ==
=== Commissioned officer ranks ===
The rank insignia of commissioned officers.

Rank group	General / flag officers					Senior officers			Junior officers
Nigerian Air Force
Nigerian Air Force	Marshal of the air force	Air chief marshal	Air marshal	Air vice-marshal	Air commodore	Group captain	Wing commander	Squadron leader	Flight lieutenant	Flying officer	Pilot officer

=== Other ranks ===
The rank insignia of non-commissioned officers and enlisted personnel.

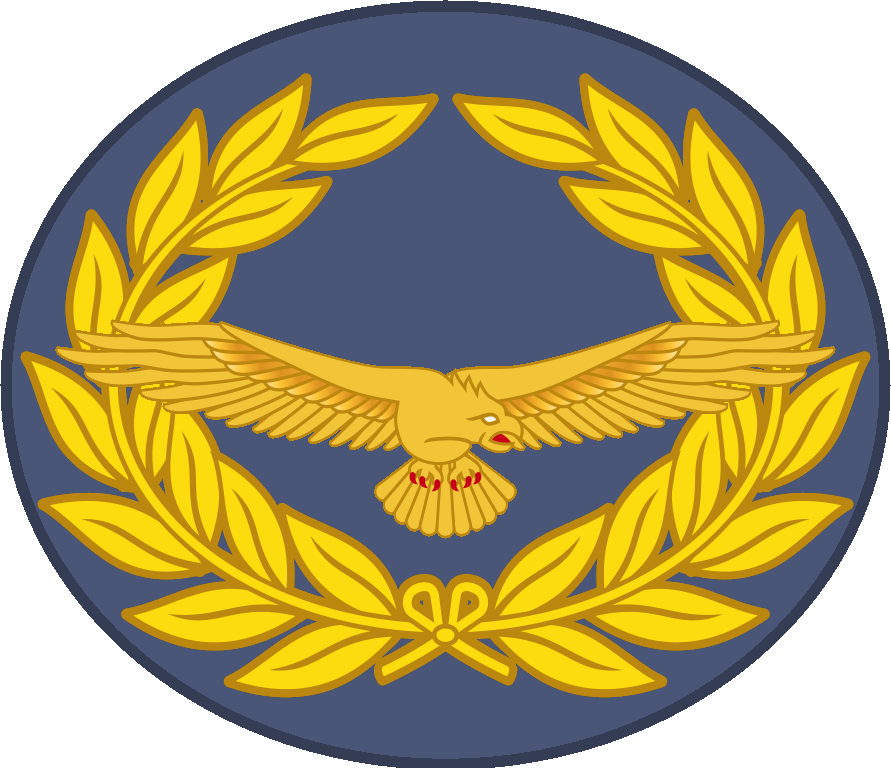
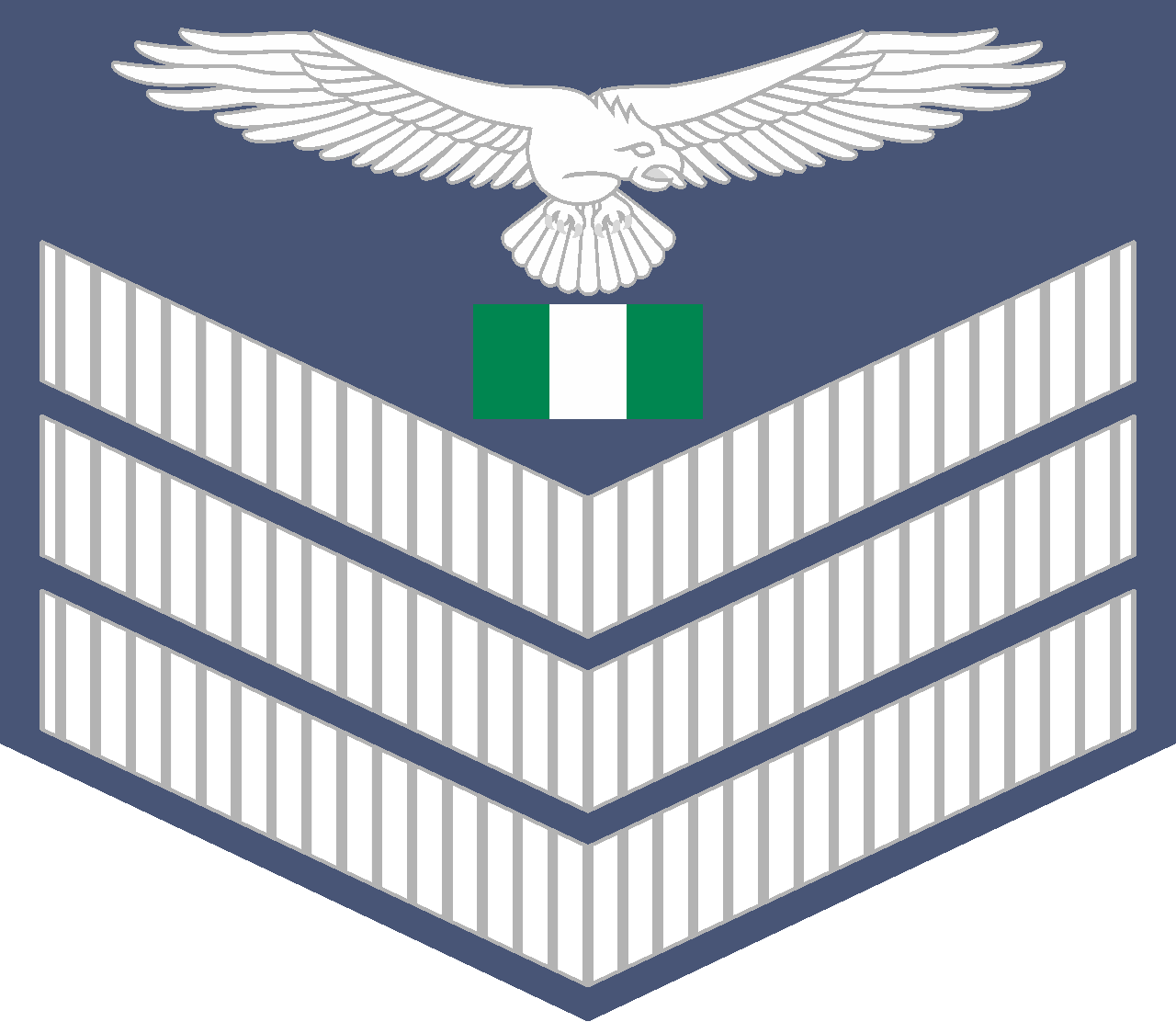
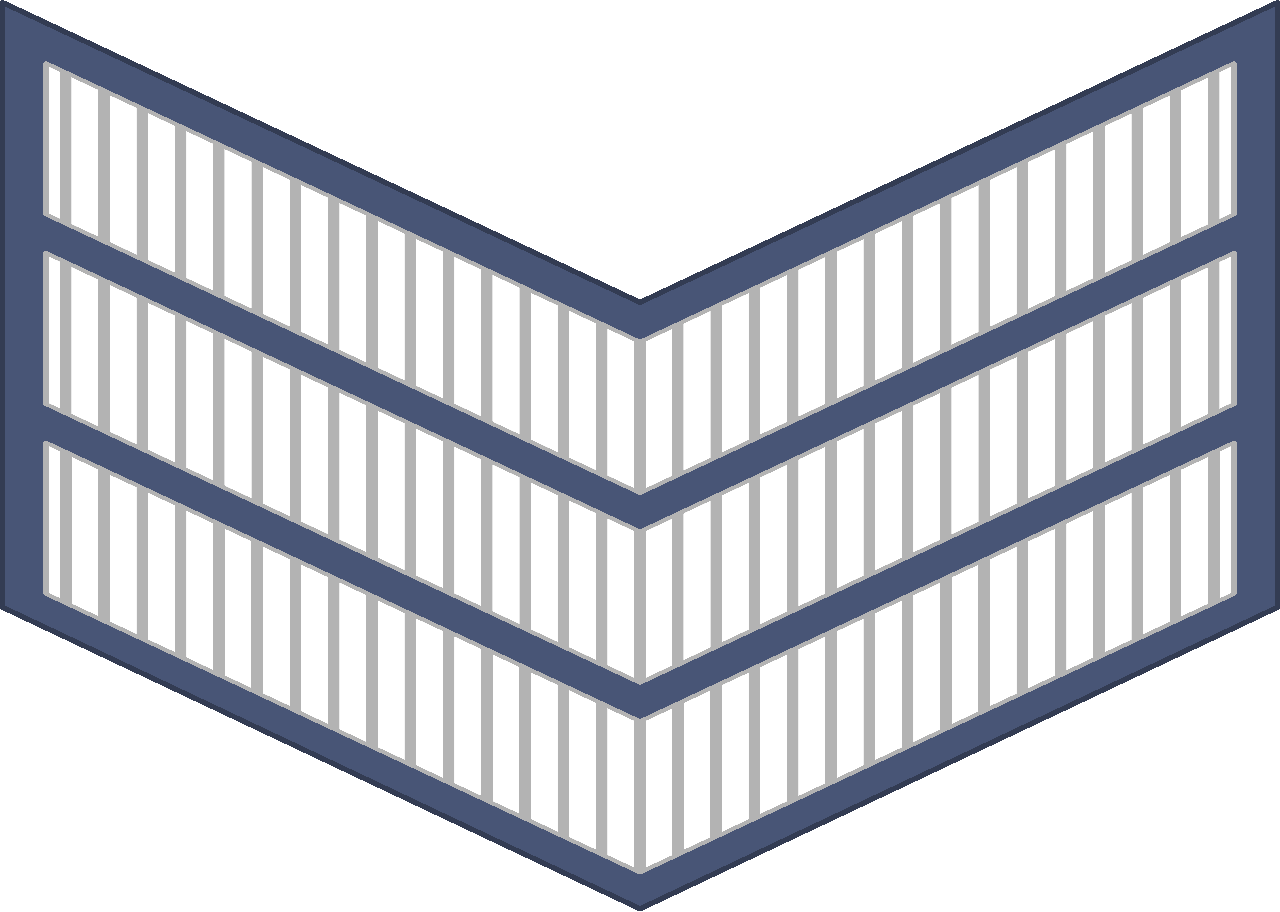
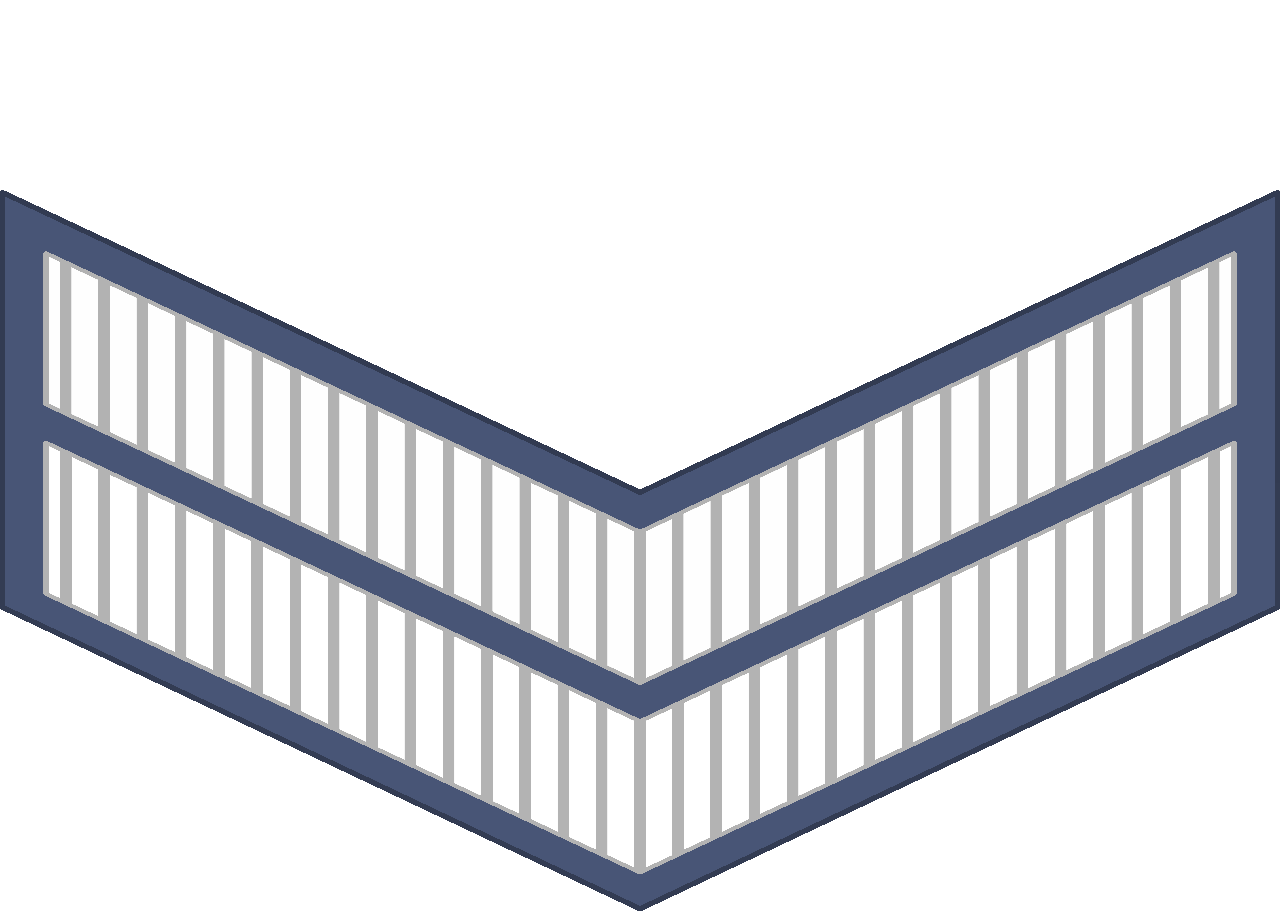
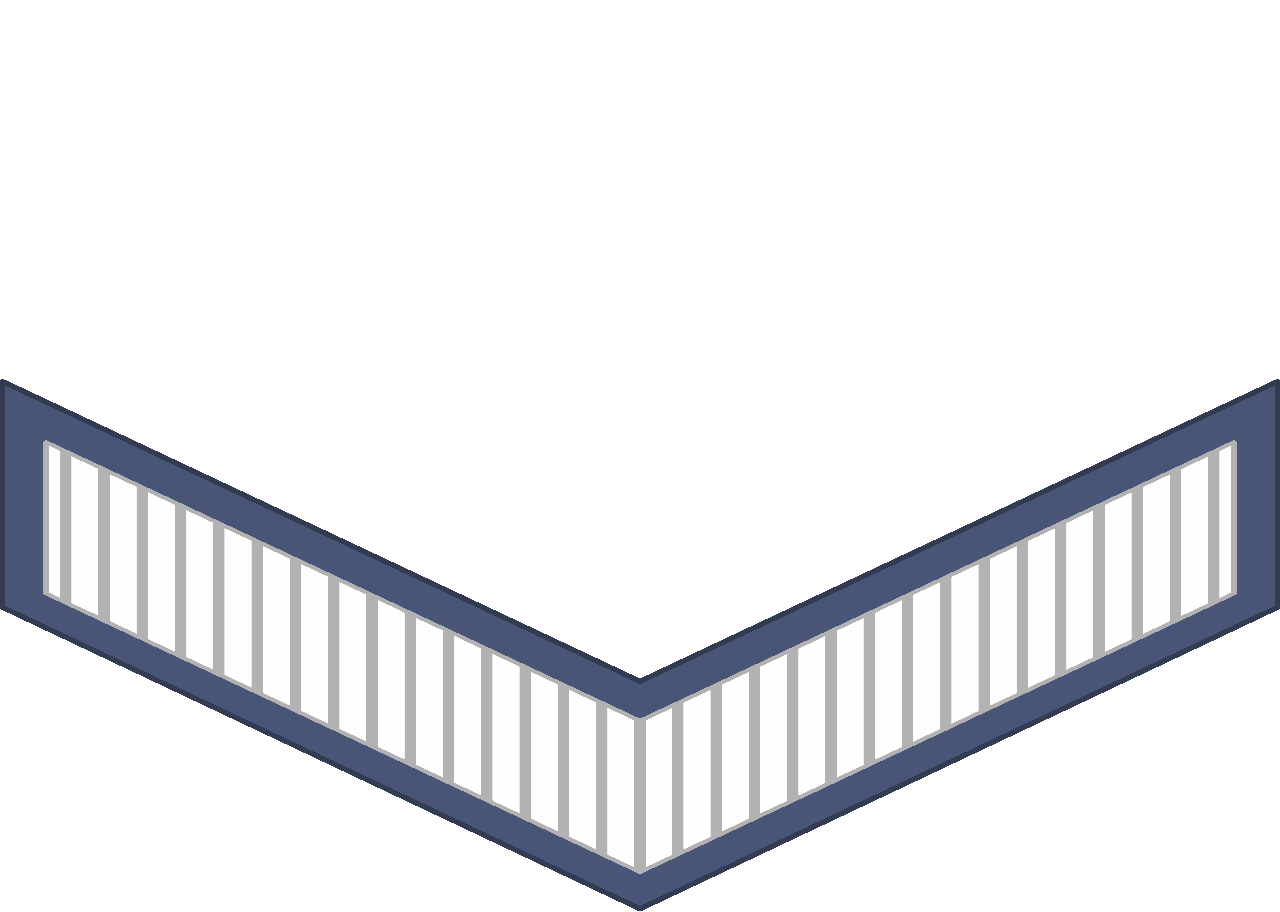
Rank group	Senior NCOs					Junior NCOs		Enlisted
Nigerian Air Force								No insignia
Nigerian Air Force	Air warrant officer	Master warrant officer	Warrant officer	Flight sergeant	Sergeant	Corporal	Lance corporal	Aircraftman

== Aircraft ==
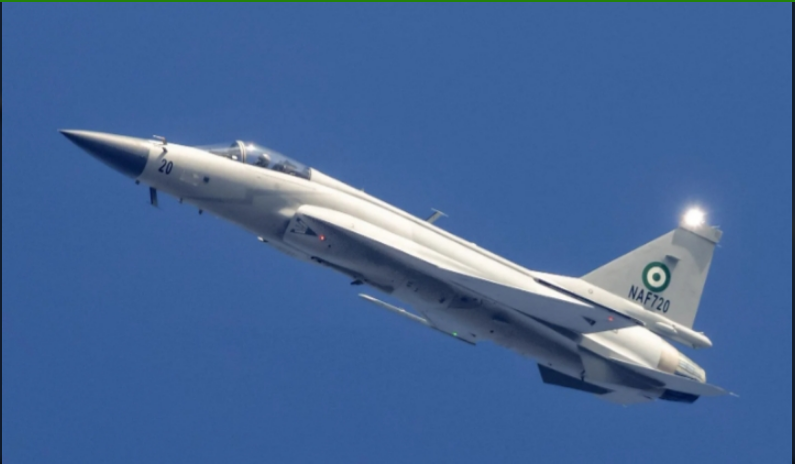

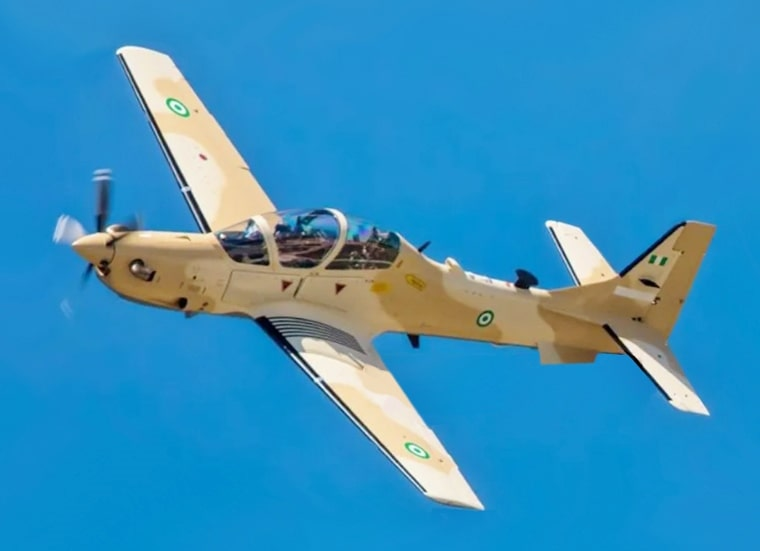

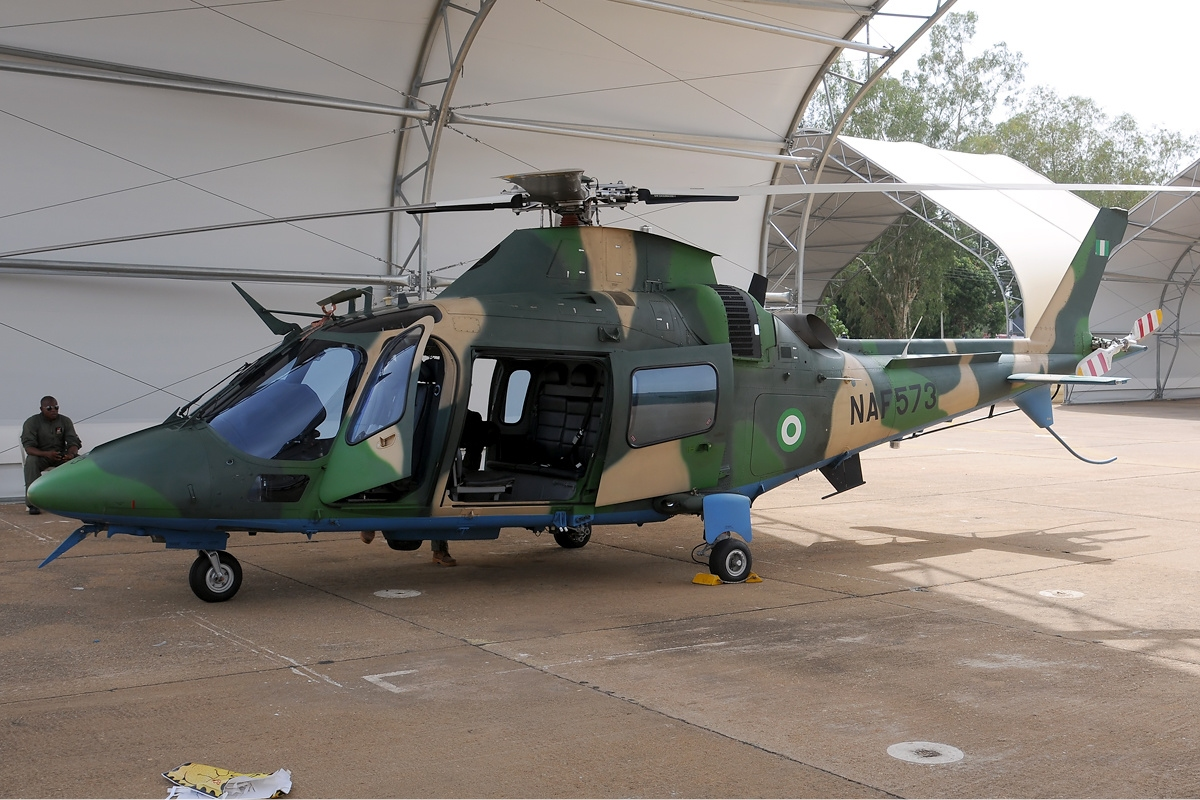

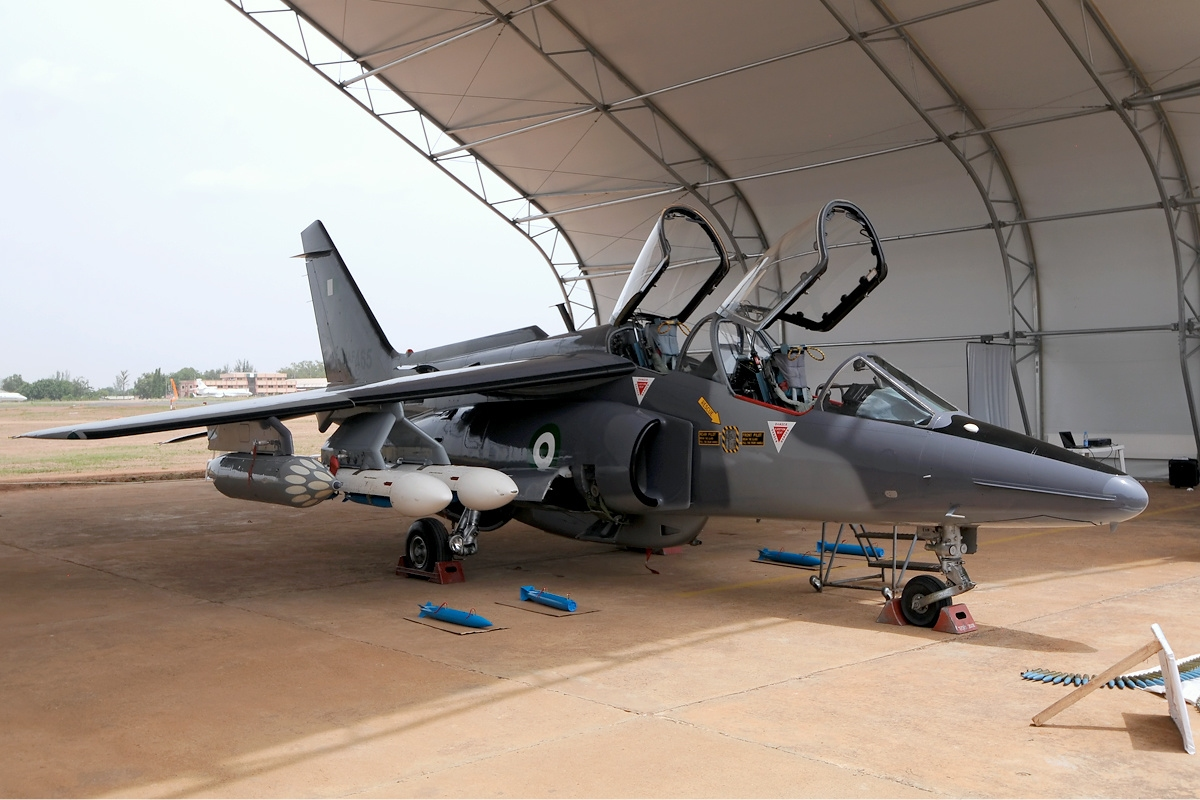

== UAV program ==
Surveillance Unmanned Aerial Vehicles
Numbers	Model	Origin	In service since
	Aerostar Tactical UAS	Israel	2006, believed to have been decommissioned due to a lack of spare parts
3	PD-1	Ukraine	Believed to have entered service in late 2020
	Tekever AR3	Portugal	In service with the Nigerian Navy since 2021
	Aerosonde Mk4	USA/Australia	Made in Australia, delivered from the US, with the Nigerian Army since 2022
	ALTI Transition	South Africa	In service with the Nigerian Police since 2022
at least 3	Elistair Orion 2	France	In service with the Nigerian Police for border protection since 2022
	Gulma	Nigeria	2013, not meant to enter active service
	Tsaigumi	Nigeria	2018, designed in collaboration with the Portuguese company UAVision. Not destined to enter active service till 2021.

Unmanned Combat Aerial Vehicles
Numbers	Model	Origin	In service since
	CASC Rainbow CH-3A	China	2014
	CASC Rainbow CH-4A	China	since late 2021
2 (according to Chinese state sources)	CAIG Wing Loong II	China	2021
	Yabhon Flash-20	United Arab Emirates	in service at least up from 2021
6	Bayraktar TB2	Turkey	Made in Turkey, delivered to and flown by the Nigerian Army
minimum 10	Songar VTOL	Turkey	2022
	Ichoku	Nigeria	reportedly in development since 2017. Not yet seen.

== Incidents and Accidents ==
=== Crashes ===
- On 26 September 1992, a NAF Lockheed C-130H Hercules serial number 911 crashed three minutes after take-off from Lagos, Nigeria, when three engines failed, possibly due to high take-off weight. All 158 people on board were killed, including eight foreign nationals.
- On 25 January 2015, a photo appeared online at Beegeagle's Blog, appearing to show a CASC Rainbow CH-3 UCAV which crashed upside down near Dumge village in the Mafa District of Borno State. The two anti-tank missiles on the CH-3's wings appear to be intact. Borno is the area where much of the Boko Haram violence, including the massacre of 2,000 civilians, occurred in 2015. The Nigerian military is fighting to hold onto the city of Maiduguri against a Boko Haram onslaught, so it appears likely that the CH-3 in question was flying reconnaissance and fire support missions for the military when it crashed. The use of armed drones by Nigerian forces in combat makes Nigeria one of the first five countries to do that in combat history.
- On 28 September 2018, a fatal air collision involving two F-7 aircraft occurred during a formation flying exercise involving an Aeritalia G.222 and three Alpha Jets as they practiced flight maneuvers for the 58th Independence Day celebrations in the capital, Abuja. As the F-7 jets turned to the formation flying, their wings clipped each other's side. Both planes lost stability due to the collision and it resulted to the spiral loss of both jets and they both crashed at the Katampe district of Abuja. Three pilots ejected out of the crippled jets. The two pilots who were on the F-7Ni ejected and landed with minor G-force injuries, and the third pilot on the F-7 ejected and sustained head injuries due to the problems from the parachute as it deployed. The pilot died on the way to the hospital as emergency services rushed to the scene of the crash. The Nigerian Air Force was notified and responded with search and rescue for all three pilots, while witnesses helped in evacuating the pilots from their stricken planes.
- On 2 January 2019, one Mi-35M attack helicopter from the Nigerian Air Force helicopter squadron crashed in Damasak, Borno State while providing close-air support for troops of the 145 Battalion combating Boko Haram insurgents, killing all on board.
- On 31 March 2021, an Alpha Jet crashed near Borno State in North Eastern Nigeria, after it was conducting an air interdiction on Boko Haram. At about 5:08 p.m., the jet was reported to have stopped pinging on radar and presumed to have crashed. The wreckage was reported missing and found nineteen months later by Nigerian Army troops.
- On 18 July 2021, while returning from an air interdiction mission in the North Western region of Nigeria along the Kaduna-Zamfara state boundaries, an Alpha Jet piloted by Flight Lieutenant Abayomi Dairo was shot down by "armed bandits" in Zamfara State. Flight Lieutenant Dairo successfully ejected from the plane, evaded capture and made his way to a Nigerian Armed Forces base in the area with minor injuries. He was given a "hero's return" by the Chief of Defense Staff and other top officers, Armed Forces of Nigeria, General Lucky Irabor, alongside other military top brass.
- On 14 July 2023, while on a routine training exercise in Markudi, Benue State, a Chengdu FT-7 crashed at 4:15 pm WAT local time. Both pilots ejected out of the jet and were rescued by the Air Force personnel assigned to search and rescue.
- On 14 August 2023, a NAF MI-171 Helicopter, which was involved in on "casualty evacuation mission", encountered a crash at approximately 1:00 pm. The helicopter's initial point of departure was Zungeru Primary School, with its destination set for Kaduna state. However, it was later determined that the helicopter had suffered a crash in the proximity of Chukuba Village, situated within the administrative jurisdiction of the Shiroro Local Government Area in Niger State. The number of passengers or crew members could not be ascertained. Meanwhile, Islamic Jihadists claimed responsibility for the incident.
- On 5 October 2026, a NAF ATR-42 identified by the tail number NGR 931 on an routine mission from Benin city to Lagos, crashed near Igbokoda in the southwestern Ondo state. 25 people on board, which included 20 passengers and 5 crew members were killed in the crash.

=== Errant Missions ===
The Nigerian military has made several mistakes while conducting air strikes in recent times. One particularly fatal error happened in December 2023, when the Nigerian forces accidentally hit a village with an armed UAV in northwestern Nigeria killing 85 civilians celebrating a Muslim festival. The army said they thought the people were rebels.

In 2024, a Christmas Day airstrike in Sokoto state killed at least 10 people and injured many others. The military targeted the terror group Lakurawa in the villages of Gidan Sama and Rumtuwa, but civilians were caught in the crossfire. The incident raised concerns among human rights groups, including Amnesty International, which called on the Nigerian military to review its procedures and avoid such deadly accidents in the future.

Other reported and noteworthy incidents include:

- January 2017: The air force bombed a camp of internally displaced people in Rann, killing more than 100 refugees and aid workers
- 25 April 2021: A fighter jet mistakenly bombed a Nigerian Army truck, killing over 20 officers
- September 2021: The air force bombed a fish market in Daban Masara, killing at least 60 people
- 18 December 2022: An air strike killed 64 people in Mutumji village
- 24 January 2023: An air strike killed more than 40 herders in Doma region
- 5 December 2023: A drone attack killed more than 85 civilians who were villagers that the remote pilots reportedly mistook for terrorists.
- 27 December 2024: At least 10 people were killed and several wounded when military jets mistakenly bombed civilians in the northwestern state of Sokoto.
- On 13 January 2025, it was reported that at least 16 civilians in Nigeria's north-western Zamfara State were killed in a military air strike, apparently after being mistaken for criminal gangs.

According to SBM Intelligence, a Lagos-based research firm, more than 400 Nigerian civilians have died during these types of incidents between 2017 and 2025. Unfortunately, no significant lessons or operational changes have resulted from these mishaps as they seem to regularly recur.

== Education ==
The Nigerian Air Force Directorate of Education operates primary and secondary schools for dependent children of personnel. They are:

- Air Force Comprehensive School Enugu
- Air Force Comprehensive School Ibadan
- Air Force Comprehensive School Kaduna
- Air Force Comprehensive School Kano
- Air Force Comprehensive School Uyo
- Air Force Comprehensive School Yola
- Air Force Girls' Comprehensive School Abuja
- Air Force Secondary School Ikeja
- Air Force Secondary School Makurdi
- Air Force Secondary School Port Harcourt
- Air Force Secondary School Shasha

== Bibliography ==
- Michael I. Draper and Frederick Forsyth, Shadows: Airlift and Airwar in Biafra and Nigeria 1967-1970 (Howell Press, 2000) ISBN 1-902109-63-5
- Hoyle, Craig. "World Air Forces Directory". Flight International, Volume 192, No. 5615, 5–11 December 2017. pp. 26–57. ISSN 0015-3710
- Martin, Guy. "Nigerian Regeneration". Air International. Vol 83 No 5, November 2012. pp. 84–89. ISSN 0306-5634.
- Sampson, A. (1977) The Arms Bazaar: From Lebanon to Lockheed, Viking, ISBN 978-0-670-13263-8
- World Aircraft Information Files. Brightstar Publishing, London. File 338 Sheet 01
