= Tudun Biri drone strike =

2023 fatal Nigerian military action

- Part of Nigerian bandit conflict
- Location: Tudun Biri, Kaduna State, Nigeria
- Date: 3 December 2023
- Attack type: Accidental drone strike
- Deaths: 120+ (per Amnesty International Nigeria); 88+ (per Nigerian authorities)
- Perpetrator: Nigerian Air Force

On 3 December 2023, a drone strike was carried out by the Nigerian Armed Forces on Tudun Biri, Kaduna State. Targeting what they thought was a group of bandits, the army mistakenly hit a village killing at least 88 civilians.

== Background ==
In their campaigns against bandits and jihadist activity in northern Nigeria, drones have been heavily used by the Nigerian government. These have led to airstrikes on civilian centers with heavy casualties, including an attack in Nasarawa State in January that killed 39 civilians. A drone strike in Kaduna State in March 2023 killed three others in Sabon Gida. Survivors of the attack stated that no bandits were in Tudun Biri, and the one time there was a bandit, he was disowned.

== Strike ==
The drone strike occurred as the villagers were celebrating Mawlid, the birth of the Prophet Muhammad. A Nigerian drone flying overhead in routine counter-terrorism operations mistook the movements of the civilians for bandits, and the Nigerian Air Force called in an airstrike on the village. A survivor of the attacks stated, "I was just standing when I head loud sounds of bombs." Immediately after the attacks, the survivors fled in every direction, sleeping in the woods that night.

The Nigerian Air Force initially denied responsibility for the attacks, but later admitted that 85 people were killed. This number was stated by Kaduna State governor Uba Sani and the Nigerian National Emergency Management Agency. Amnesty International's Nigeria office, citing locals, stated that 120 people were killed in the attack. Most of the dead were children.

== Aftermath ==
Fifty bodies were buried on the first day, and the remaining bodies were buried in a mass burial on December 5. In May 2024 it was announced that two military officers would face court martial as a result of the investigation into this incident.

=== Reactions ===
President Bola Tinubu expressed his condolences for the victims, and ordered an investigation into the airstrike. Nigerian Army chief of staff Taoreed Lagbaja attended the funeral and echoed Tinubu's sentiments.
