= May 2022 Anambra State killings =

2022 series of attacks in Nigeria

- Part of the insurgency in Southeastern Nigeria
- Anambra State in Nigeria
- Date: 15 May 2022; 22 May 2022
- Target: Pro-government officials, northern Nigerian civilians, commercial motorcycle riders
- Attack type: Political assassination (15 May 2022); Shooting, mass murder (22 May 2022)
- Deaths: 14
- Perpetrator: Pro-Biafra separatist militants (suspected IPOB members)
- Motive: Biafran separatism (suspected)

In May 2022, militants reportedly associated with IPOB, a Biafran separatist group, murdered 14 civilians in a series of attacks in Anambra State. Among the victims were a pregnant woman as well as children. The killings were part of the insurgency in Southeastern Nigeria.

== Background ==
In January 2021, a separatist insurgency developed in southeastern Nigeria, mainly supported by local Igbo people. Security forces and armed separatists started to clash with increasing intensity over the following months. The most prominent separatist group, Indigenous People of Biafra (IPOB), officially continued to claim that it intends to achieve the independence of Biafra through non-violent means. However, IPOB fields an armed wing, the Eastern Security Network, and has been blamed for many attacks in southeastern Nigeria.

One of the main strategies used by local separatist militants are pro-Biafra protest sit-ins which are enforced through violence and intimidation. These protests are partially aimed at pressuring the Nigerian government to free Nnamdi Kanu, leader of IPOB.

== Killings ==
Okechukwu Okoye, a member of the Anambra State House of Assembly was abducted with an aide on 15 May 2022. Okoye's head was found in a park in Nnewi South on 21 May. The rest of his body and the corpse of his aide were later also recovered.

On 22 May 2022, militants reportedly carried out two massacres. In the first incident, a Biafran separatist group ambushed Harira Jibril and her family. Born in Adamawa State, Jibril was an ethnic Hausa and resident in Orumba South. She had visited relatives and was on her way back to her home with a motorcycle taxi when the militants attacked at Isulo, Orumba North. Jibril -who was pregnant- and her four children aged two to nine were murdered, while their driver escaped. The family's corpses were later photographed and filmed, and published on Twitter with the killing being attributed to Jibril's northern origin. On the same day, five commercial motorcycle riders were murdered in Onocha, possibly due to refusing to comply with IPOB's order for civilians to stay at home. The body of one murdered motorcyclist was burned by the attackers. In addition, a roadside salesman was killed at Nnanka. The motorcycle riders and the salesman were also of northern Nigerian origin.

Local police attributed the attacks to IPOB. IPOB denied any responsibility for the killings.

== Victims ==
Overall, 14 civilians were murdered during the attacks. The following individuals were confirmed as being victims of the May 2022 Anambra State killings:

- Okechukwu Okoye, Aguata 2 Constituency representative in the Anambra State House of Assembly
- Cyril Chiegboka, aide to Okechukwu Okoye
- Harira Jibril, 32 years old
- Fatima Jibril, 9 years old
- Khadijah Jibril, 7 years old
- Hadiza Jibril, 5 years old
- Zaituna Jibril, 2 year old
- Abdullahi, salesman

== Aftermath ==
The May killings reportedly caused many individuals of northern origin, mostly Hausa, to leave their homes or close their shops in Anambra State. Alhaji Usman Abdullahi, the Hausa emir of Ihiala in Anambra went into exile. The murders, especially the deaths of Harira Jibril and her family, provoked outrage among northern Nigerians in social media.

The Anambra State governor Charles Chukwuma Soludo put up a 10 million naira ($24,000) reward for information on Okechukwu Okoye's killers and pledged that the murderers of Harira Jibril's family would be captured. Nigerian President Muhammadu Buhari condemned the attacks, calling them "wild, barbarous and wanton".

== See also ==
- Indigenous People of Biafra
