= Uche Mefor =

Pro-Biafra activist

- Born: 10 April 1972 (age 54); Abatete in Idemili North L.G.A of Anambra State
- Education: University of Essex, University of East London, Nnamdi Azikiwe University, Coventry University
- Occupations: Human Rights, Political and Igbo-Biafra activist
- Known for: Biafra Activism

Alphonsus Uche Okafor-Mefor (born April 10, 1972) also known as Uche Mefor is a British-Nigerian pro-Biafra political activist. He was the deputy director of Radio Biafra and former deputy leader of the Indigenous People of Biafra (IPOB) led by Nnamdi Kanu.

== Career ==
Okafor-Mefor has been a pro-Biafran activist for years. Before joining IPOB, Mefor was a devoted member of Movement for the Actualization of the Sovereign State of Biafra (MASSOB) and the Biafra Actualization Forum. He was a former deputy leader of the Indigenous People of Biafra (IPOB).

Around mid-2020, it was claimed Okafor-Mefor openly confronted his colleague, Nnamdi Kanu, on religious bigotry, incitement to violence, and policy issues surrounding the running of IPOB as an organisation. This led him to separate from Nnamdi Kanu.

After resigning his position as IPOB Deputy Leader in November 2020, Okafor-Mefor floated his own radio station which he called the Biafra Human Rights and Freedom Radio (BHFR). He has since acted as the Head of Information and Communication of the Biafra De Factor Customary Government. He also founded the Igbo-Biafra Nationalist Movement and the Indigenous People of Igbo Nation for Self-Determination (IPINS).
