= World Igbo Summit Group =

- Formation: 5 states (Abia, Anambra, Ebonyi, Enugu and Imo)
- Members: Director general - Ifedi Okwenna
- Official language: Igbo, English

The World Igbo Summit Group is an umbrella body that brings all the Igbo people and its relevant bodies like Indigenous People of Biafra, Ohanaeze Ndigbo, World Igbo Congress, Igbo Leadership Development Foundation and including present/past political office holders, Royal kings, professionals, businessmen, Civil society activists, gender advocates and other experts of Igbo extraction residing in different parts of the world together to Foster the growth and unity of the five state comprises Imo State, Anambra state, Enugu state, Ebonyi state, and Abia State.

The group was formed in 2006 with Ifedi Okwenna as the Director general and strategic meetings are held yearly to bring all igbo heads within and outside the country together so as to foster unity and to project their 50-year visioning plan for 2066.

== Conflict ==
In 2018 the Indigenous People of Biafra threatened for the summit not to be held insisting that the group would not accept anything other than a referendum for the rebirth of the Republic of Biafra.

The World Igbo Summit Group has called for an end to all contention and conflict in Ohanaeze Ndigbo and request all aggrieved parties to come together in the larger interest of Igbo people.

== Vision Plan ==
In 2016, World Igbo Summit Group adopted the resolutions for the immediate implementation of the 50-year visioning plan. The group took the decision at a post-summit meeting of the group held at the Gregory University, Uturu in Abia State.

The resolution articulates short term, mid-term and long-term strategic plans to “comprehensively tackle the development of Igboland” and promote the well-being of the people. It also strives to persuade Igbo entrepreneurs and investors in Nigeria and Diaspora to think-home and invest in Igboland.
