= World Igbo Congress =

World Igbo Congress (WIC) is a Houston-based sociopolitical organization that promotes the Igbo people's interests in Nigeria. It focuses its support on economic and legal aid to the Igbo population, the victims of ethnic cleansing before and after the Nigerian Civil War, as well as the rehabilitation of Biafran War veterans.

== History ==
World Igbo Congress was founded in Houston, Texas, United States, to represent the general interests of the Igbo people of southeastern Nigeria. It serves as an umbrella organization for all people of Igbo descent who live outside Nigeria, primarily those that live in the United States. The organization was founded on 27 August 1994, following a meeting, in Houston, of prominent Igbo leaders from across the United States. In July 2012, WIC was granted "special consultative status" by the United Nations Economic and Social Council (ECOSOC). WIC was patterned after the famous World Jewish Congress, WJC.

In 1997, the World Igbo Congress Foundation (WICF) was established as WIC's project development arm.

== Structure ==
World Igbo Congress is listed in the open yearbook of The Union of International Associations, UIA, as an internationally recognized non-governmental organization. In a 2006 paper presented at the annual conference of the Igbo Studies Association, Dr. Ugorji O. Ugorji pointed out that many Igbo interest groups and organization affiliate themselves with World Igbo Congress. Members of the organization retain their individual membership rights, hence, they vote and run for office on their individual merits and not as delegates of any affiliated organizations.

WIC states that its objective is to bring Igbo people and organizations in the United States together to focus on an established Igbo tradition of channeling initiatives for infrastructural development towards the homeland. Like many other Igbo community development associations, WIC works to bring Igbo people together and to encourage brotherhood and development. World Igbo Congress indicates that it is building a modern hospital, in Igbo land, to help mitigate the problem of "medical tourism."

== Socio-political activism ==
World Igbo Congress's initiatives focus on encouraging good governance and accountable leadership in the Igbo speaking states of Nigeria. For example, WIC supported the new voting system initiatives (e.g. absentee voting) in Nigeria.

Over the past two decades, WIC has continued to find ways to exert its influence on issues regarding ethnic divisions and conflicts that affect the welfare of Igbo people in Nigeria. One example of such influence came after a meeting it called in July, 2019. Following the conference, WIC criticized the state of insecurity in Nigeria; alleging that the clashes between nomadic herdsmen and farming communities have worsened the security situation. However, some of its past attempts to foray into hot button political issues have not gone too well. One notable example was the 2015 appearance of Nnamdi Kanu at the WIC convention in Los Angeles, California. In his speech at the convention, Kanu, the leader of the separatist Indigenous People of Biafra, IPOB, publicly solicited the help of WIC in its effort to procure “guns and bullets” to fight the Nigerian government.

World Igbo Congress has worked to bring both international and domestic attention to socio-political issues and government policies that are deemed hostile to the interests of Igbo people who are predominantly business owners, merchants, industrialists, and general entrepreneurs. WIC has strategically aligned itself with international associations, including the various arms of the United Nations. Such alliances are used to bring other Igbo groups that advocate the cause of Igbo people into the network of international non-governmental organizations. World Igbo Congress also helps new immigrants integrate into the Nigerian diaspora network in addition to providing support in navigating the U.S. job market. WIC also provides support to new immigrants that are transitioning and resettling in the United States.

== Criticisms ==
Not all Igbo people are on board with the idea of World Igbo Congress or its agenda. The long-running leadership fights and other activities that observers consider frivolous have been sources of constant criticisms. These fights affect WIC's ability to accomplish some of its stated objectives. One such conflict led to a 2016 lawsuit filed by Nwaguru. The case, which challenged Eto on who had the right to act as the president of World Igbo Congress, illustrates many disputes that dragged from an unresolved 2014 chairmanship election.

Observers note that the organization spends much of its resources on these disputes. Many are further aggrieved by other issues such as the failure to include younger Igbo people in the organization and its activities. In a 2008 article, an Abuja-based lawyer, Ikechukwu Ogu, famously described World Igbo Congress as "a jamboree in a foreign land." The 2019 convention in Houston, Texas, however, saw a peaceful election and a smooth transition to the new leadership. Observers are watching to see if the years of “World Igbo Confusion,” as one critic put it, are finally behind.

Some critics also cite the confusion regarding identity. For instance, there are members of the Igbo ethnic group who are reluctant to fully participate. These are groups that claim to be Ika, Ikwerre, Ngwa, and Arochukwu, respectively. Their source of contention, they say, is that they speak their own unique dialect of the Igbo language, (dialects) and not mainstream Igbo; or that they have different geopolitical agenda.

== See also ==
- World Igbo Summit Group
- Arondizuogu Patriotic Union
