= List of Nigerian cities by population =

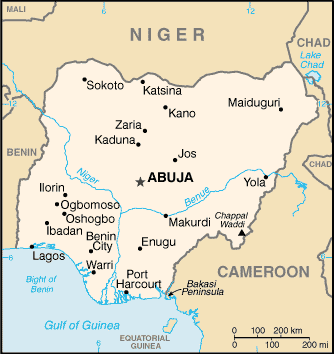
Map of major cities in Nigeria

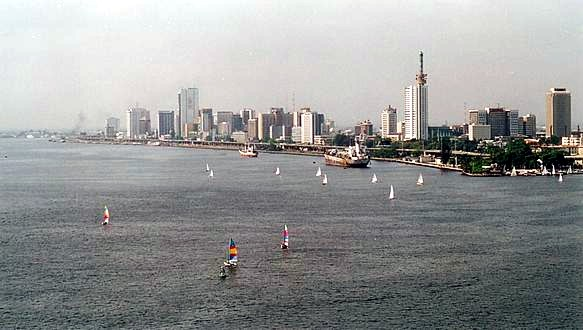
1. Lagos

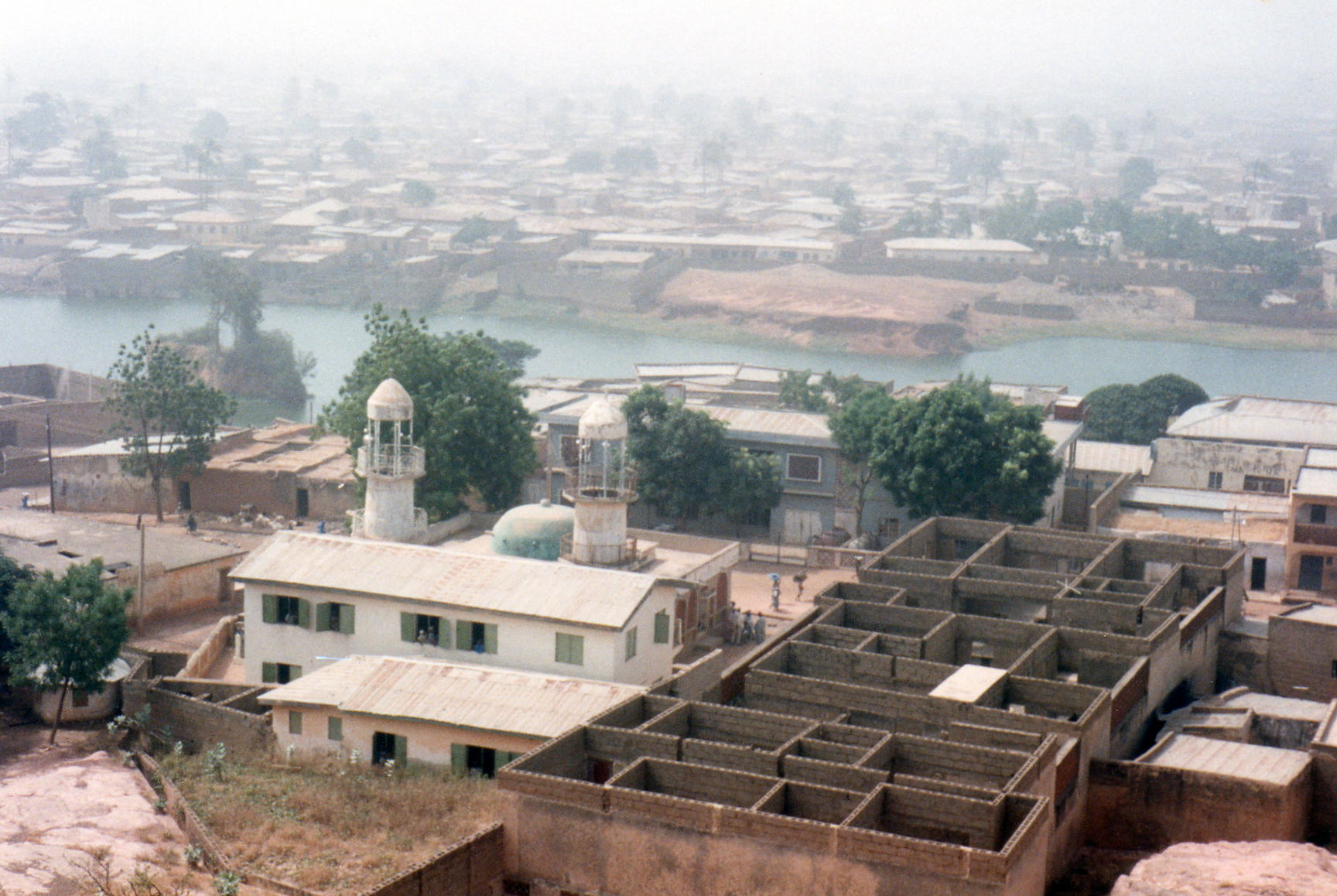
2. Kano

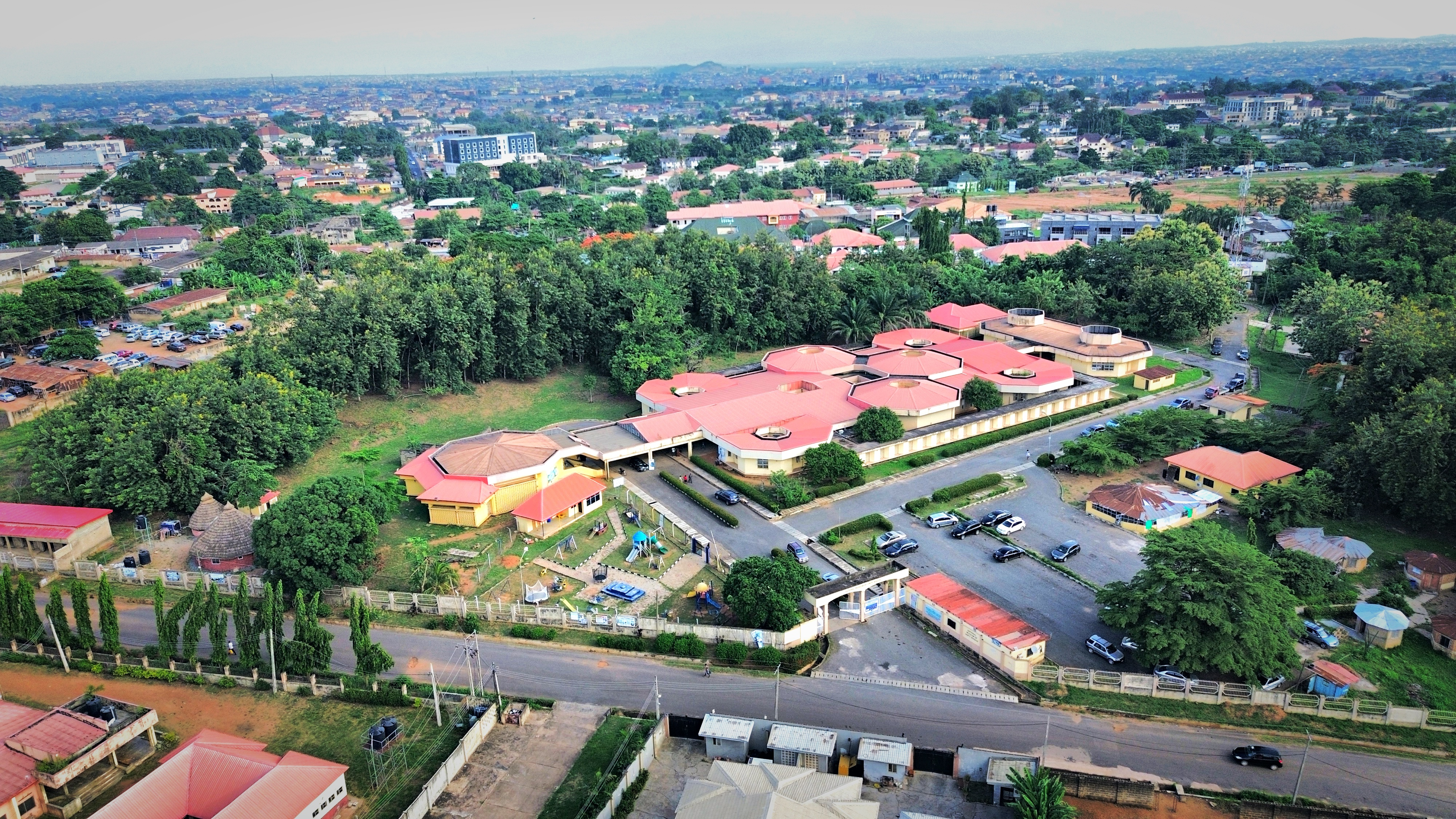
3. Ibadan

The following are lists of the most populous fully defined incorporated settlements in Nigeria by population. This page consists of three different tables, with different kinds of settlements; a list for "defined cities", listing the population, strictly within the defined city limits, a list for "urban area" population, and another list for the population within metropolitan areas.

== Lists ==
=== Defined cities/towns ===
Nigerian cities are categorized into three types; there is the "Metropolis", which is characterized by having more than one Local Government Areas (LGAs). These types of cities are usually formed when large municipalities are split into smaller LGAs, to aid efficient administration and management, when small towns grow and merge into existing large cities, or both; some are also formed when urban areas of multiple LGAs merge as a result of growth and are now fully defined as a single settlement, Another type of settlement is the "Municipality", which is basically an LGA that is fully defined as its own city or town. These types of cities are usually mid-sized, although some large cities also exist as a single LGA. The third type of settlement is the "village", which is basically grouped together with several other villages into one sizeable LGA.

The following table lists fully defined incorporated cities in Nigeria, with a population of at least 100,000, as declared by the Nigerian National Population Commission after the 2006 National census. This list refers only to the population of individual cities within their defined limits, which does not include other distinct communities or extended suburban areas within urban agglomerations. A city is displayed in bold if it is a state or federal capital, and in italics if it is the most populous city in the state.

Rank	City	State	2006 census	Total area		Population density	
Rank	City	State	2006 census	km^{2}	sq mi	per km^{2}	per sq mi
1	Lagos (Note: Metropolitan Lagos consists of 16 out of Lagos State's 20 LGA, which excludes: Badagry, Epe, Ibeju-Lekki and Ikorodu)	Lagos	7,099,490	1,151.1	444.4	6,871	17,800
2	**Kano** (Note: summing the 8 LGAs in Kano, which includes: Kano Municipal, Fagge, Dala, Gwale, Tarauni, Nasarawa, Ungogo and Kumbotso)	Kano	2,828,861	523.6	202.2	6,300	16,000
3	**Ibadan** (Note: Summing the 11 LGAs of Ibadan)	Oyo	2,559,853	563.1	217.4	985.13	2,551.5
4	**Benin City** (Note: Benin City consists of 3 LGAs, which includes: Egor, Oredo and Ikpoba-Okha)	Edo	1,147,188	344.8	133.1	953	2,470
5	**Port Harcourt** (Note: summing Obio-Akpor and Port Harcourt LGA, which both make up the city)	Rivers	1,005,904	394.5	152.3	2,726	7,060
6	Aba (Note: Aba North Aba South, Osisioma Ngwa, Ugwunagbo and Obingwa LGAs)	Abia	1,002,265	163.7	63.2	7,400	19,000
7	**Jos** (Note: Jos consists of 3 LGAs, which includes: Jos North, Jos South and some parts of Jos East)	Plateau	821,618	336.7	130.0	451	1,170
8	**Ilorin** (Note: Ilorin consists of 3 LGAs, which includes: Ilorin East, Ilorin South and Ilorin West)	Kwara	777,667	149.3	57.6	1,016	2,630
9	**Abuja**	FCT	776,298	865.6	334.2	439	1,140
10	**Kaduna** (Note: Kaduna consists of 2 LGAs, which includes: Kaduna North and Kaduna South)	Kaduna	760,084	488.9	188.8	5,802	15,030
11	**Enugu** (Note: Enugu East, Enugu North and Enugu South LGAs)	Enugu	722,664	186.8	72.1	1,300	3,400
12	Zaria (Note: Zaria consists of 2 LGAs, which includes: Zaria and Sabon Gari)	Kaduna	695,089	132.3	51.1	1,234.6	3,198
13	Ogbomosho (Note: Ogbomosho North and Ogbomosho South LGAs)	Oyo	602,690	119.9	46.3		
14	Warri (Note: Warri North, Warri South and Warri South West LGAs)	Delta	557,398	214.8	82.9		
15	Ikorodu	Lagos	535,619	37.1	14.3	1,553	4,020
16	**Maiduguri**	Borno	521,492	194.7	75.2	3,807	9,860
17	Ife (Note: Ife North, Ife Central and Ife East LGAs)	Osun	509,035	56.1	21.7	291	750
18	**Bauchi**	Bauchi	493,810	187.2	72.3	134	350
19	**Akure**	Ondo	484,798	196.4	75.8	489	1,270
20	**Abeokuta**	Ogun	451,607	242.1	93.5	510	1,300
21	**Uyo** (Note: Itu and Uyo LGAs)	Akwa Ibom	436,606	209.7	81.0	1,206	3,120
22	Oyo (Note: Atiba, Oyo East and Oyo West LGAs)	Oyo	428,798	42	16	177	460
23	**Sokoto**	Sokoto	427,760	138	53		
24	**Owerri**	Imo	401,873	201.1	77.6	729	1,890
25	**Yola** (Note: Yola North and Yola South LGAs)	Adamawa	392,854	119.8	46.3	473	1,230
26	**Calabar**	Cross River	371,022	118.8	45.9	910	2,400
27	**Umuahia** (Note: Umuahia North and Umuahia South LGAs)	Abia	359,230	121.1	46.8	933	2,420
28	Ondo	Ondo	358,430	32.2	12.4		
29	**Minna** (Note: Bosso and Chanchaga LGAs)	Niger	348,788	112.1	43.3	209	540
30	**Lafia**	Nasarawa	330,712	89.8	34.7		
31	Okene	Kogi	320,260	32.7	12.6	976.4	2,529
32	**Katsina**	Katsina	318,459	142.6	55.1	2,243	5,810
-	**Ikeja**	Lagos	313,196	49.92	19.27	6,274	16,250
33	Nsukka	Enugu	309,633	45.38	17.52		
34	**Ado Ekiti**	Ekiti	308,621	114.2	44.1	1,053	2,730
35	**Awka**	Anambra	301,657	95.6	36.9		
36	Iseyin	Oyo	286,700	45.2	17.5		
37	Mubi (Note: summing Mubi North and Mubi South)	Adamawa	280,009	63.2	24.4		
38	Onitsha (Note: consists of 2 LGAs: Onitsha North and Onitsha South)	Anambra	261,604	121.2	46.8	5,030.8	13,030
39	Sagamu	Ogun	253,412	28.2	10.9		
40	**Makurdi**	Benue	249,000	73.1	28.2		
41	Mokwa	Niger	244,937	25.2	9.7	56.4	146
42	Badagry	Lagos	241,093	28.2	10.9	547	1,420
43	Ilesa	Osun	233,900	30.1	11.6		
44	**Gombe**	Gombe	230,900	72.2	27.9		
45	Obafemi Owode	Ogun	228,851	34.2	13.2	162	420
46	Owo	Ondo	218,886	27.3	10.5	213	550
47	Suleja	Niger	216,578	35.1	13.6	1,820	4,700
48	Lavun	Niger	209,917	35.1	13.6	74	190
49	Potiskum	Yobe	205,876	51.2	19.8	368	950
50	Kukawa	Borno	203,864	24.2	9.3	41.6	108
51	**Gusau**	Zamfara	201,200	81.2	31.4		
52	Iwo	Osun	191,377	21.2	8.2	894	2,320
53	Bida	Niger	188,181	51.2	19.8	3,689	9,550
54	Ugep	Cross River	187,000	34.1	13.2		
55	Ijebu Ode	Ogun	186,700	43.2	16.7		
56	Epe	Lagos	181,409	33.2	12.8	188	490
57	Ise Ekiti	Ekiti	167,100	35.2	13.6		
58	Gboko	Benue	166,400	22.8	8.8		
59	Ilawe Ekiti	Ekiti	160,700	23.2	9.0		
60	Ikare	Ondo	160,600	24.2	9.3		
61	**Osogbo** (Note: Osogbo and Olorunda LGAs)	Osun	156,694	47.2	18.2	3,334	8,640
62	Okpoko	Anambra	152,900	38.1	14.7		
63	Garki	Jigawa	152,233	38.4	14.8	108.12	280.0
64	Sapele	Delta	151,000	38.2	14.7		
65	Ila	Osun	150,700	29.3	11.3		
66	Shaki	Oyo	150,300	34.2	13.2		
67	Ijero	Ekiti	147,300	26.1	10.1		
68	Ikot Ekpene	Akwa Ibom	143,077	22.3	8.6	1,233	3,190
69	**Jalingo**	Taraba	139,845	56.4	21.8		
70	Otukpo	Benue	136,800	24.3	9.4		
71	Okigwe	Imo	132,237	20.3	7.8		
72	Kisi	Oyo	130,800	19.3	7.5		
73	Buguma	Rivers	124,200	21.1	8.1		
74	Funtua	Katsina	122,500	27.1	10.5		
75	**Abakaliki**	Ebonyi	151,723	57.7	22.3		
76	**Asaba** (Note: Oshimili South LGA)	Delta	149,603	24.8	9.6	558	1,450
77	Gbongan	Osun	117,300	20.4	7.9		
78	Igboho	Oyo	115,000	19.2	7.4		
79	Gashua	Yobe	109,600	37.2	14.4		
80	Bama	Borno	102,800	24.1	9.3		
81	Uromi	Edo	101,400	23.2	9.0		

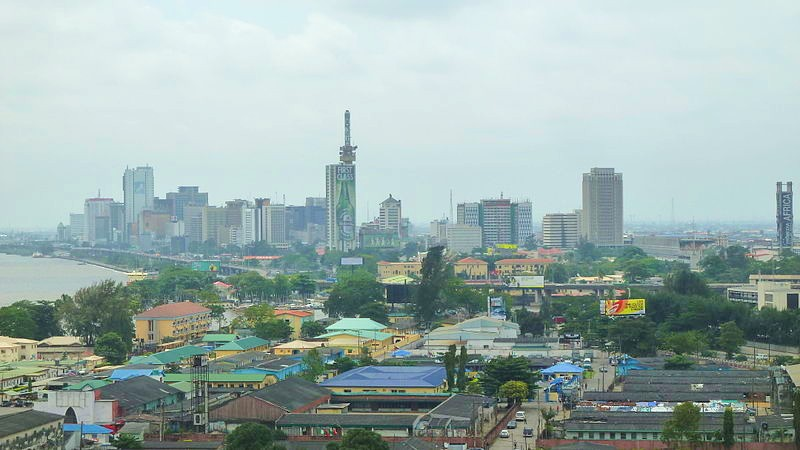
Lagos, Lagos

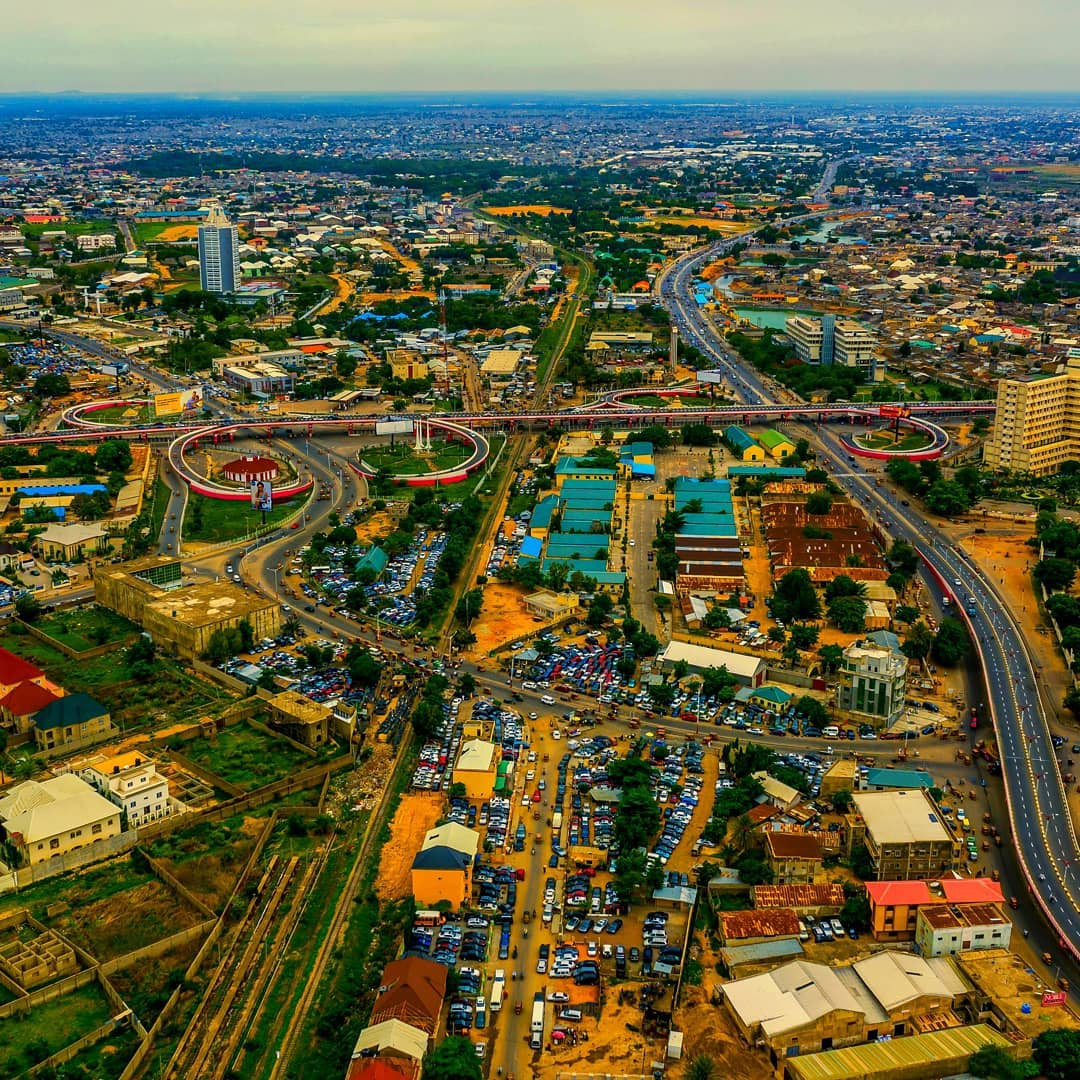
Kano, Kano

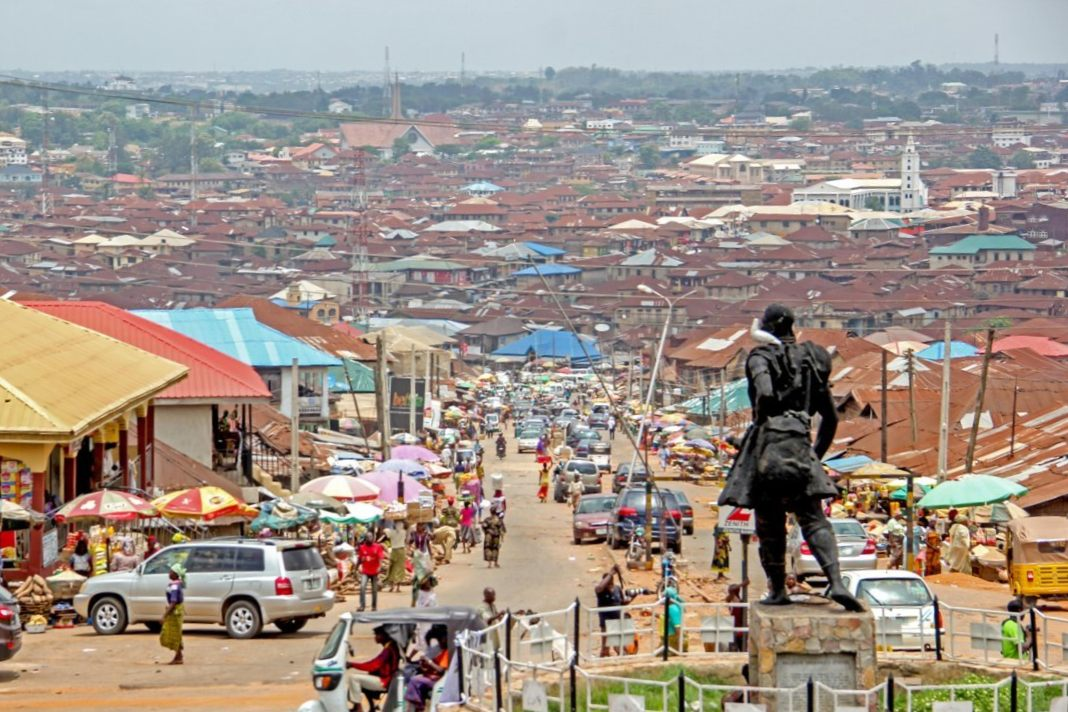
Ibadan, Oyo

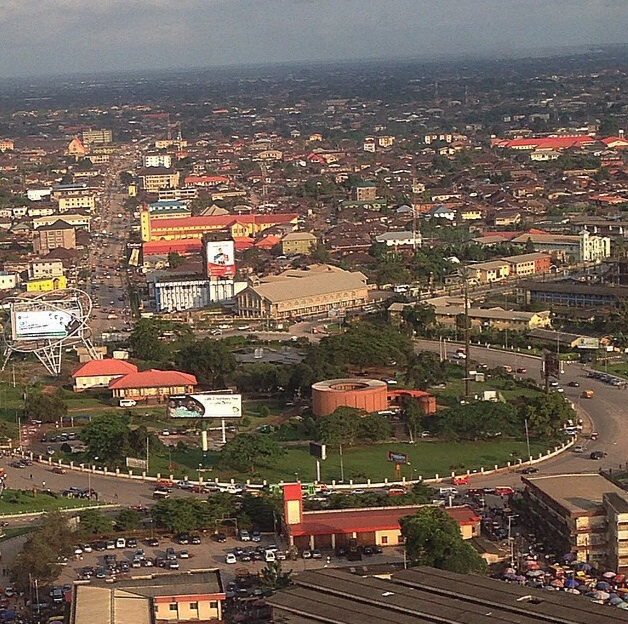
Benin City, Edo

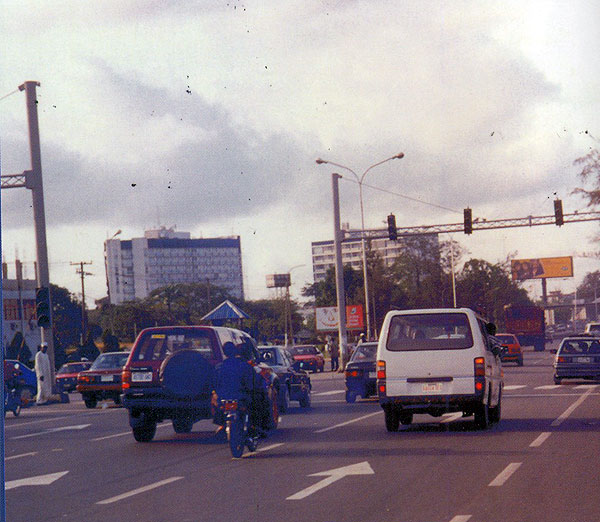
Port Harcourt, Rivers

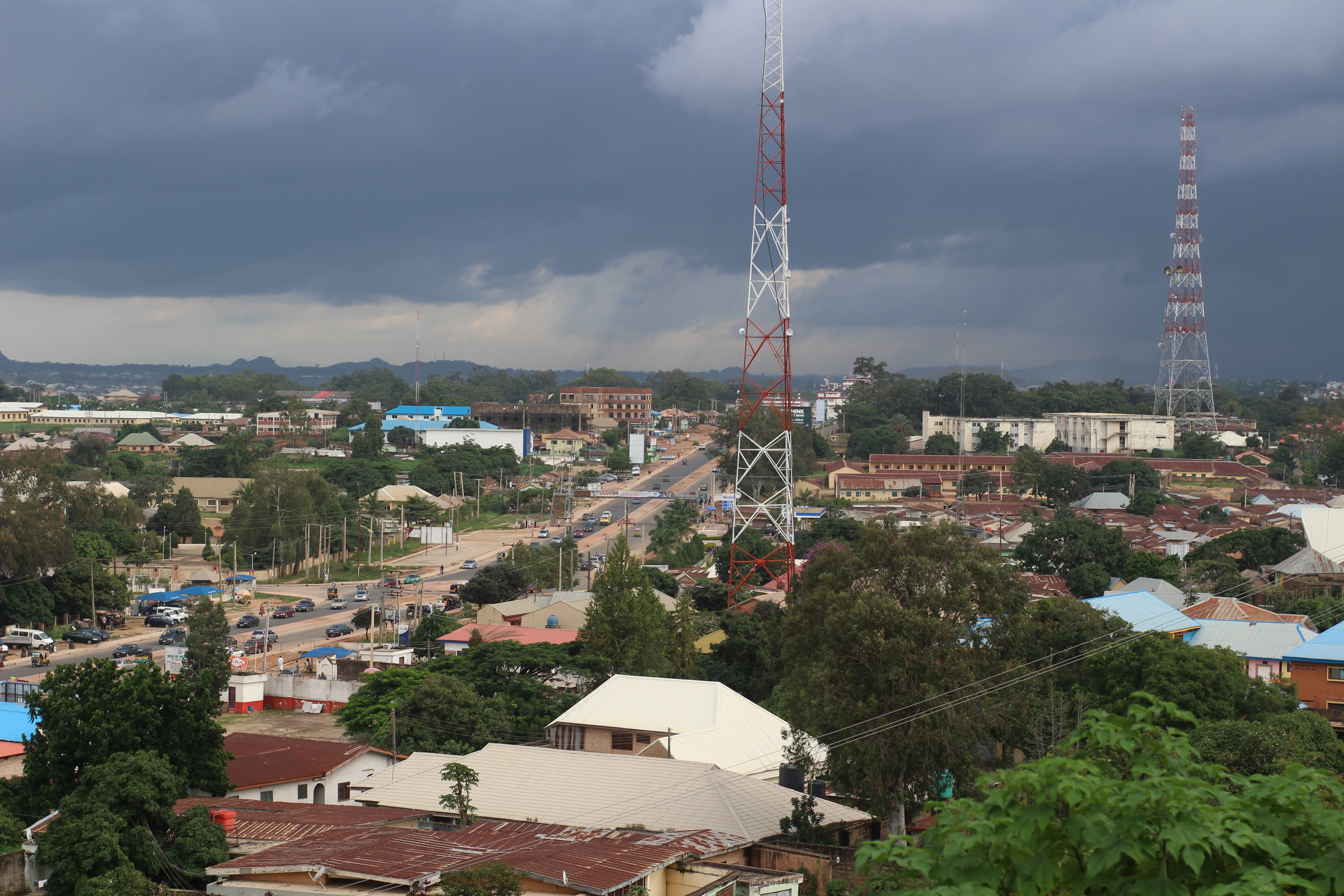
Jos, Plateau

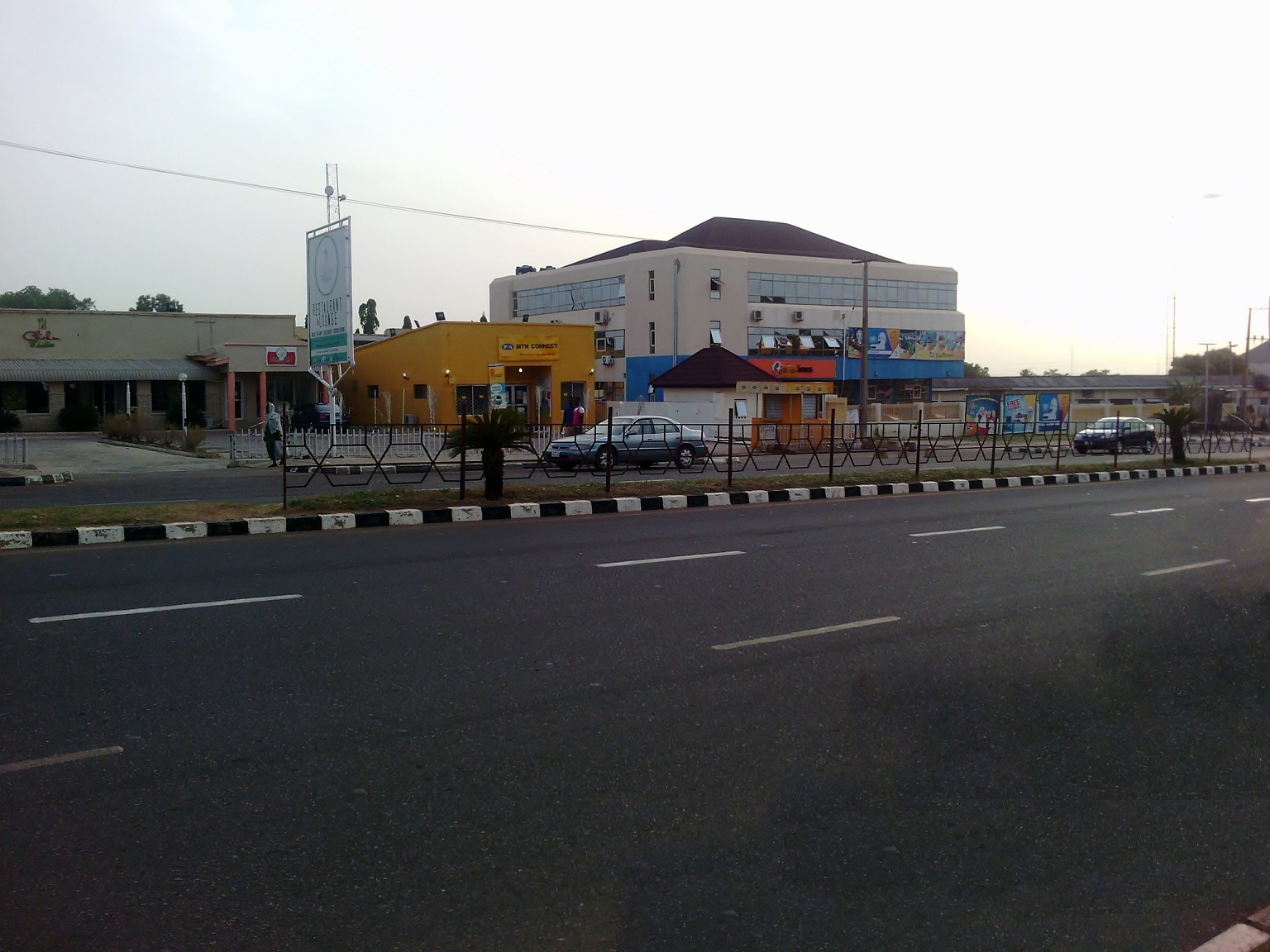
Ilorin, Kwara

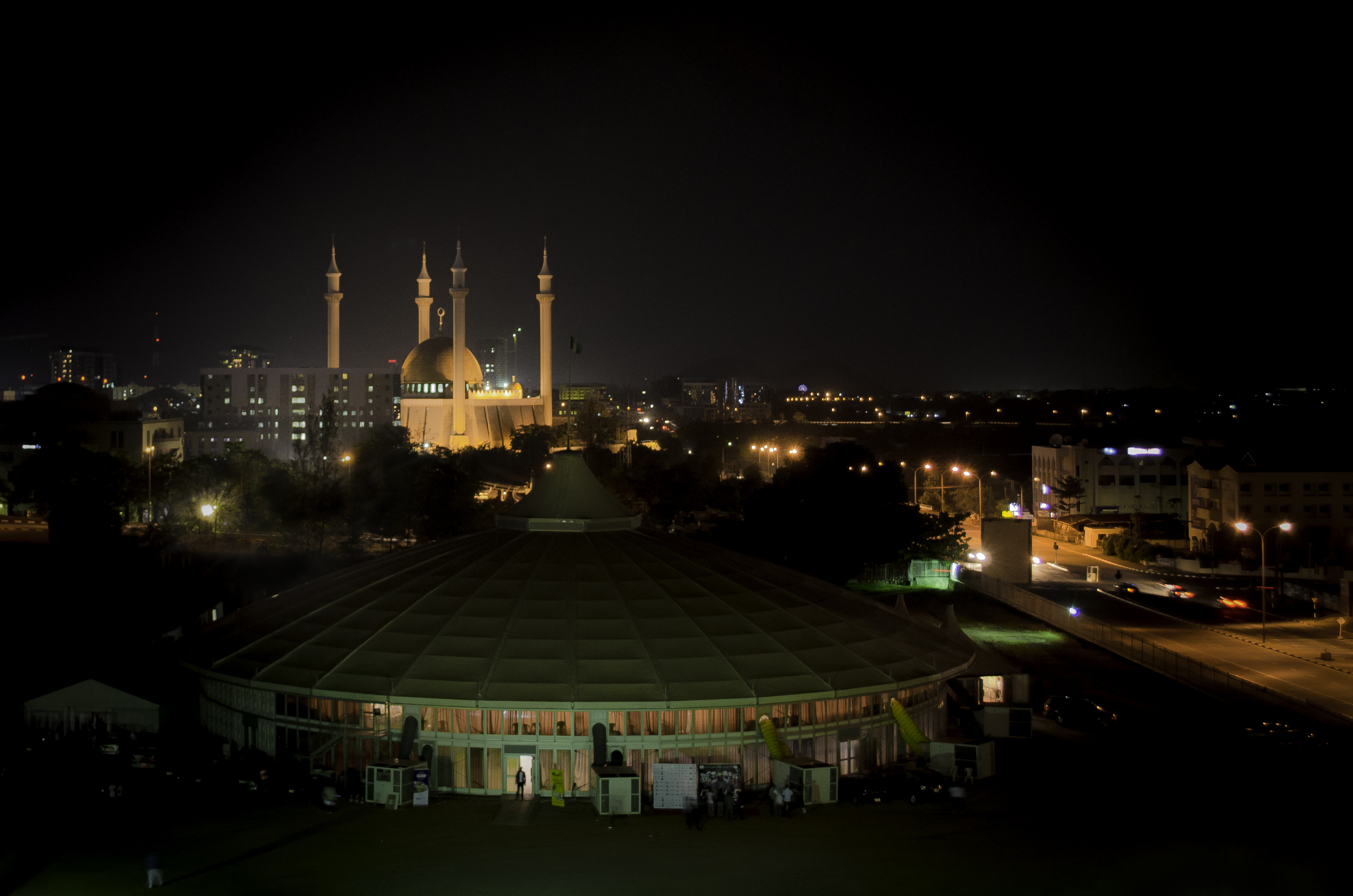
Abuja, FCT

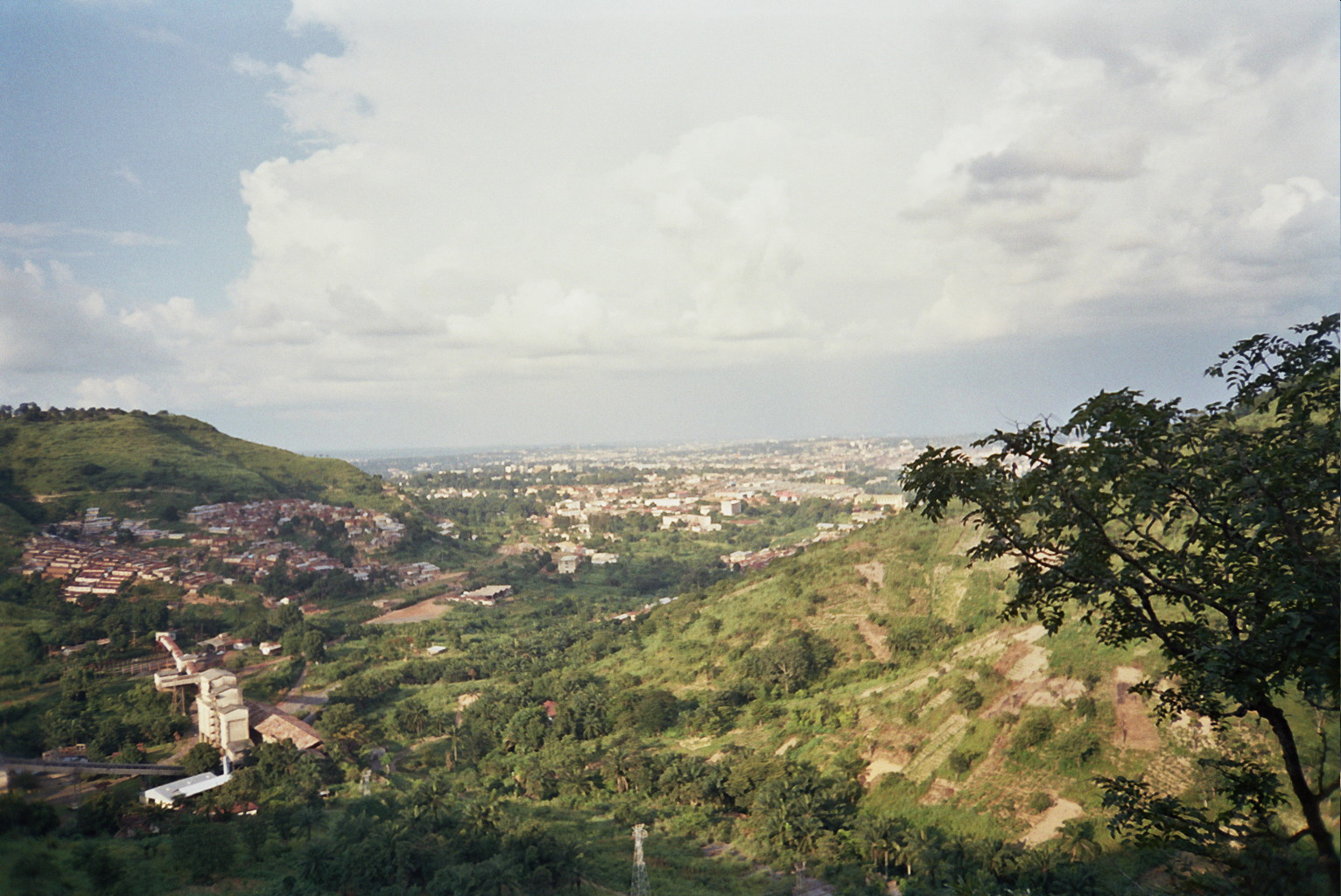
Enugu, Enugu

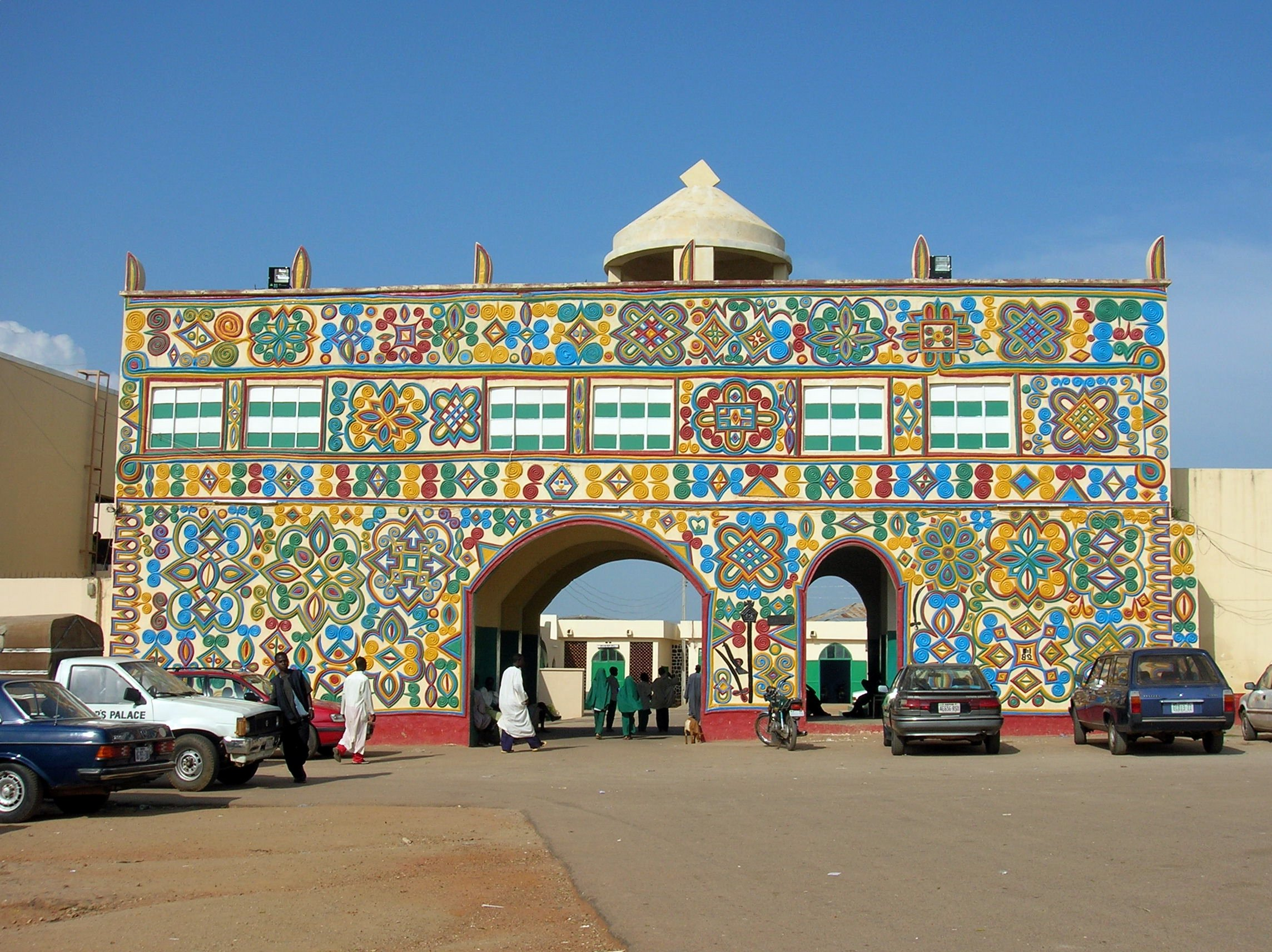
Zaria, Kaduna

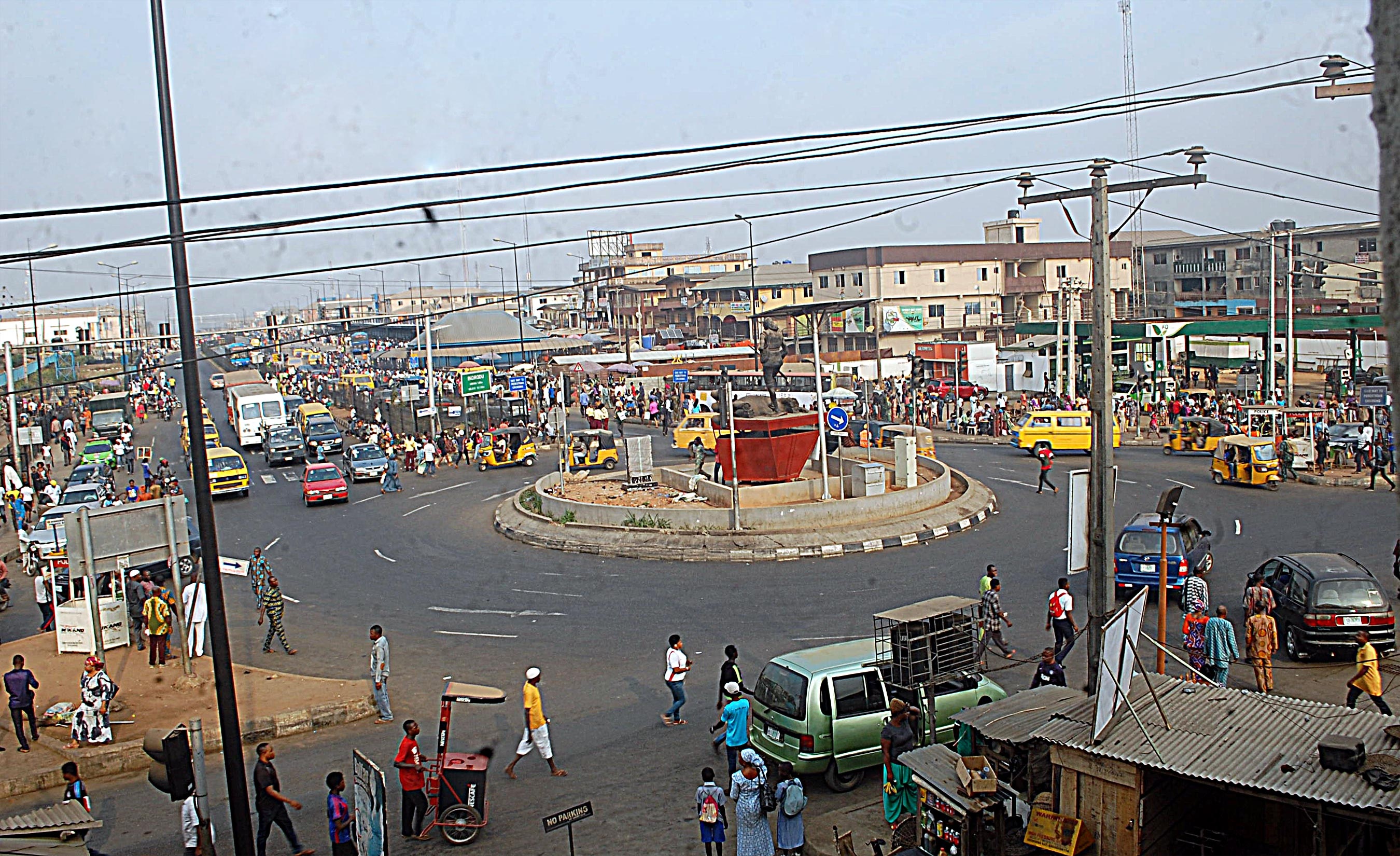
Ikorodu, Lagos

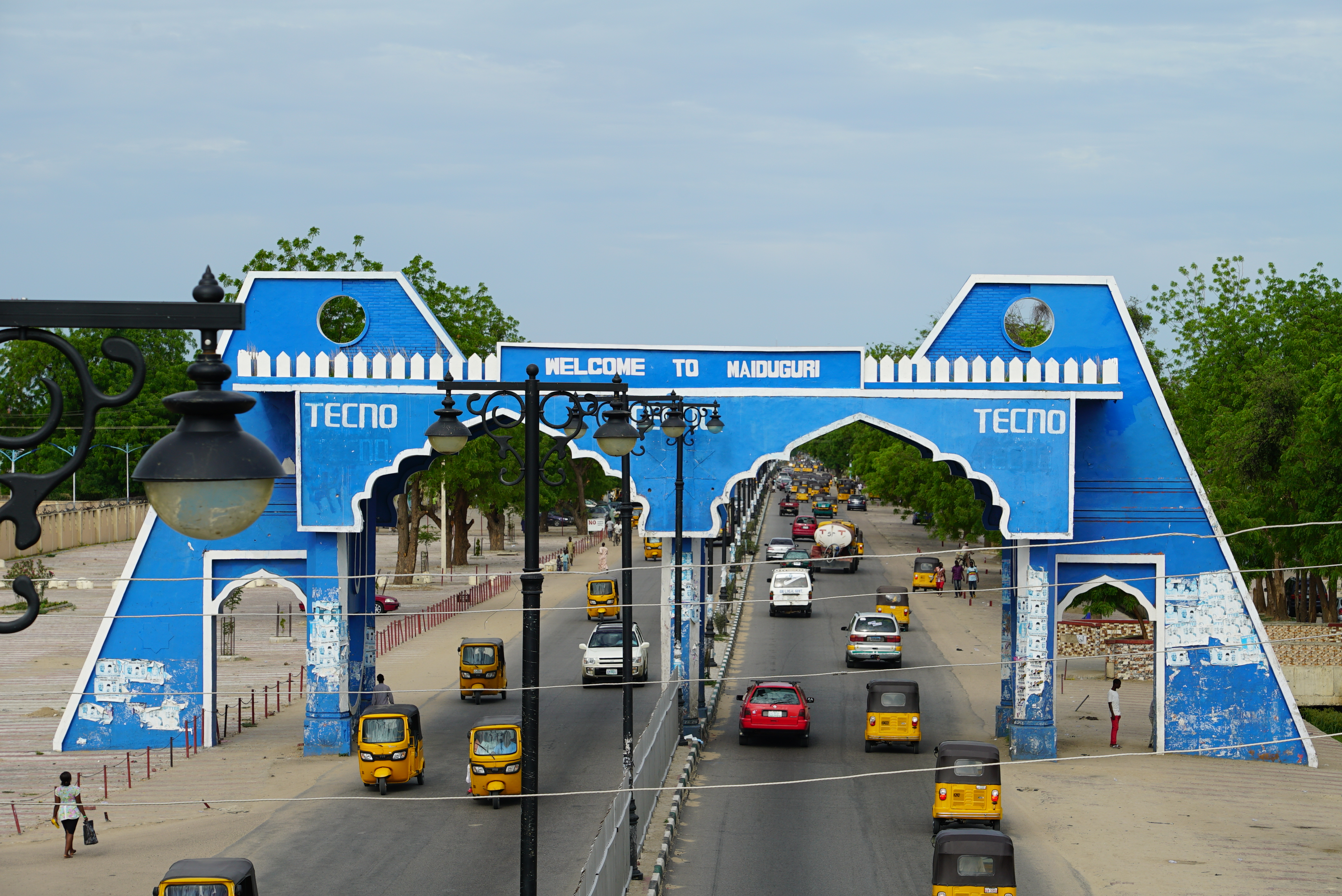
Maiduguri, Borno

== Population ==
According to the 2006 Nigerian national census, Kabba/Bunu Local Government Area, with headquarters in Kabba, had a population of 145,446 people.

=== Urban areas ===
An urban area is a continuously built-up land mass of urban development that is within a labor market, without regard for administrative or city boundaries. An urban area is a human settlement with high population density and infrastructure of a built environment.

This section lists contiguous urban areas in Nigeria, with a population of at least 500,000. The figures here have been taken from Demographia's "World Urban Areas" study in 2016. Demographia uses maps, satellite photographs to estimate continuous urbanization.

Rank	City	State	Population	Area		Density	
Rank	City	State	Population	km^{2}	sq mi	per km^{2}	per sq mi
1	Lagos	Lagos	12,830,000	1,425	550	9,000	23,000
2	Onitsha	Anambra	7,910,000	832	321	14,300	37,000
3	Kano	Kano	3,680,000	251	97	14,600	38,000
4	Ibadan	Oyo	2,910,000	466	180	6,200	16,000
5	Port Harcourt	Rivers	1,865,000	158	61	11,800	31,000
6	Jos	Plateau	1,580,000	225	87	7,000	18,000
7	Benin City	Edo	1,355,000	228	88	5,900	15,000
8	Aba	Abia	1,215,000	901	348	13,400	35,000
9	Kaduna	Kaduna	1,100,000	153	59	7,200	19,000
10	Abuja	FCT	890,000	83	32	10,700	28,000
11	Enugu	Enugu	810,000	682	263	1,200	3,100
12	Ilorin	Kwara	790,000	70	27	11,300	29,000

== Cities and Towns by population ==
=== 2025 population estimates ===
1. Lagos 17,803,700
2. Kano 4,810,800
3. Abuja 4,392,360
4. Ibadan 4,293,160
5. Port Harcourt 3,951,670
6. Benin City 2,120,460
7. Onitsha 1,839,880
8. Uyo 1,520,020
9. Aba 1,428,069
10. Nnewi 1,421,790
11. Kaduna 1,302,330
12. Ilorin 1,282,219
13. Ikorodu 1,248,110
14. Warri 1,120,980
15. Enugu 1,115,303
16. Owerri 1,105,500
17. Jos 1,071,590
18. Umuahia 1,033,090
19. Lokoja 974,767
20. Maiduguri 929,408
21. Bauchi 881,600
22. Zaria 835,966
23. Akure 834,009
24. Abeokuta 800,000
25. Oyo 793,241
26. Sokoto 789,726 *
27. Yola 758,153
28. Ogbomosho 744,835
29. Gusau 682,700
30. Calabar 673,427
31. Osogbo 645,000
32. Yenagoa 586,393
33. Katsina 565,000
34. Minna 552,407
35. Okene 546,000
36. Makurdi 517,342
37. Ondo 510,000
38. Lafia 509,300
39. Okpoko 506,000
40. Ifẹ 492,000
41. Nsukka 483,256
42. Shaki 472,000
43. Ikeja 470,200
44. Ado Ekiti 469,700
45. Gombe 446,800
46. Sagamu 435,200
47. Awka 430,200
48. Lekki 420,000
49. Mokwa 416,600
50. Ilesa 416,000
51. Asaba 403,859
52. Obafemi Owode 399,800
53. Ijebu Ode 394,246
54. Otukpo 384,600
55. Suleja 368,900
56. Gboko 367,407
57. Iseyin 365,300
58. Lavun 359,800
59. Badagry 351,900
60. Mubi 344,599
61. Ikare 330,941
62. Jalingo 322,268
63. Potiskum 322,100
64. Bida 318,300
65. Ijero Ekiti 304,924
66. Owo 301,931
67. Garki 300,000
68. Kukawa 297,900
69. Iwo 277,101
70. Epe 269,000
71. Igboho 239,480
72. Sapele 238,800
73. Ugep 236,897
74. Funtua 236,087
75. Uromi 226,433
76. Abakaliki 223,000
77. Ise Ekiti 210,000
78. Oye 206,300
79. Ilawe Ekiti 200,000
80. Ede 200,000
81. Bama 195,377
82. Buguma 187,695
83. Okigwe 184,500
84. Ikot Ekpene 180,500
85. Ila 179,192
86. Kisi 155,510
87. Gashua 144,012
88. Gbongan 139,485
89. Oron 120,000
90. Jebba 59,820

== See also ==
- List of cities in Nigeria
- List of populated places in Nigeria
- Lists of villages in Nigeria
