= 2014 Enugu State Broadcasting Service attack =

Attack at Broadcasting station in Nigeria

2014 Enugu State Broadcasting Service Attack
- Location: Enugu State
- Goals: To reinstate the state of Biafra

Lead figures
Benjamin Onwuka	

Casualties
- Deaths: 2 (one Policeman and 1 BZF member)

The 2014 Enugu State Broadcasting Service Attack took place on June 5, 2014, when about 13 members of the Biafra Zionist Federation militant group attacked the Enugu State Broadcasting Service (ESBS) in an attempt to make a public announcement on radio and television declaring the sovereign state of Biafra.

== Background ==
Since the fall of Biafra at the end of Nigerian Civil War, there have been occasional unrest in the South-East region of Nigeria. The Biafra Zionist Federation (BZF) and the Movement for the Actualization of the Sovereign State of Biafra (MASSOB) have been the most popular pro-biafran groups in the region.

== Reaction ==
The Nigeria Police Force (NPF) were quickly alerted by some members of ESBS at the arrival of the gunmen. NPF quickly responded by killing a member of the group and arresting the remaining in a shootout that lasted for several hours. The leader of the Nigerian military team was greatly wounded during the incident.

== See also ==
- 2014 Enugu Government House attack
