= BZM =

BZM may refer to:

- Bernabé Zapata Miralles, a Spanish tennis player
- Biafra Zionist Movement, now Biafra Zionist Front
- Londo language (ISO 639 code 'bzm')
- A wireless station formerly operated by the Broadcasting Corporation of Newfoundland
