= Gbatse =

Town in Benue State

- Town
- Interactive map of Gbatse
- Coordinates: 6°59′25″N 9°15′31″E
- Local Government Area: Ushongo
- State: Benue State
- Country: Nigeria

Area
  - Total: 616.4 km^{2} (238.0 sq mi)
- Time zone: UTC+1 (WAT)

Gbatse is a town in Nigeria located in Ushongo LGA in Benue State. Gbatse was part of the Benue province until 1918 when it adopted its name from one of its dominant geographical features, the River Benue. When Nigeria was divided into regions in 1967, the structure reorganized into administrative states Benue-Plateau State. In 1976, Benue State was created out of the defunct. Gbatse is known for its culture and large agriculture. A vast majority of the inhabitants of Gbatse are members of Mbabion Kindred, Mbaikyaa District of Tiv land.
