= Owerri prison break =

Prison breakout in Nigeria

- Part of the Insurgency in Southeastern Nigeria
Date	5 April 2021
Location	Owerri
Result	Over 1,800 Inmates are released. Police fail to stop the prison break

Belligerents
Nigeria	(Republic of Biafra) Biafran separatists (IPOB suspected)

Units involved
Nigeria Police	Eastern Security Network (suspected)

Strength
unknown	unknown

Casualties and losses
over a dozen	unknown

The Owerri prison break took place in the early hours of 5 April 2021, when a mass prison break occurred in Owerri, Imo State, Nigeria. A large armed group arrived in pickup trucks and on buses carrying rocket-propelled grenades, machine guns and rifles. The group entered the prison's yard by using explosives to break through the administrative block. The group released over 1,844 inmates from the jail.

The Nigerian Inspector General suspects the Eastern Security Network, the armed wing of the banned separatist group the Indigenous People of Biafra, are responsible for the attack.

President Muhammadu Buhari described the crime as an act of terrorism perpetrated by anarchists.

The attack is part of the insurgency in Southeastern Nigeria and follows an attack in March. Over a dozen police officers and military personnel were killed in an assault on four police stations and several military checkpoints. It is believed the two attacks were perpetrated by the same group.
