= Biafra Zionist Front =

Secessionist group in Nigeria

- Leader: Benjamin Onwuka
- Founder: Benjamin Onwuka
- Founded: 2010
- Split from: Movement for the Actualization of the Sovereign State of Biafra
- Ideology: Biafran nationalism Zionism

The Biafra Zionist Front (BZF), formerly known as the Biafra Zionist Movement and also known as the Biafra Zionists Federation, is a group agitating for the restoration of Biafra and its independence from Nigeria. It is led by Benjamin Onwuka. The movement's purpose is the actualization of the sovereign state of Biafra along precolonial lines.

The group claims to be supported by Israel and the United States and explicitly relates its cause to the Zionist movement.

== History ==
The group was formerly part of the Movement for the Actualization of the Sovereign State of Biafra but was split off in 2010 by British-Nigerian lawyer Benjamin Onwuka. The group "re-declared the independence of Biafra" on 5 November 2012, for which Onwuka and 100 others were arrested and charged with treason but granted bail; the charges against Onwuka were later dismissed for lack of evidence. The group was responsible for the 2014 Enugu Government House attack on March 7, 2014, and was behind an attack on a State Broadcasting Service office a few months later.

Onwuka was arrested in 2014 but was released three years later. He immediately returned to leading the BZF.

In June 2017 the group proclaimed the independence of Biafra with Onwuka as president.

On 20 March 2018, Benjamin Onwuka was again arrested along with 20 other BZF members after they publicly announced their intention to occupy the Enugu Government House, raise the Biafran flag, and declare the independence of Biafra.

Fifty-two members of the Biafra Zionist Front, including Onwuka, were arrested on 30 May 2023 in Enugu, allegedly while marching to raise the flag of Biafra inside the Enugu Government House. One member was shot and killed by police during the demonstration.

== See also ==
- Biafra
- Igbo people
