= Flag of Biafra =

Flag of the unrecognised Republic of Biafra

Biafra
- Use: National flag
- Proportion: 4:7
- Adopted: 30 May 1967; 59 years ago
- Relinquished: 15 January 1970; 56 years ago
- Design: Red-black-green horizontal tricolor with a 11 rayed half-sun

The flag of Biafra, used by the Republic of Biafra during the Nigerian Civil War (1967–1970), consists of a horizontal tricolour of red, black, and green, charged with a golden rising sun over a golden bar. The eleven rays of the sun represent the eleven former provinces of Biafra. The rays are typically long and slender with the lowest rays being nearly horizontal and the remaining rays spread evenly between.

== Origins ==
The flag was first raised on 30 May 1967 and featured prominently during Colonel Odumegwu-Ojukwu's declaration of the independence of the Biafran Government.

The coat of arms of Biafra and the former one used by the Eastern Region

The colours of the flag of Biafra are taken directly from the original coat of arms of the Eastern Region 1960–67, which also includes the golden sun with 11 rays to represent the provinces of the former region. The flag is in the same style as the former Northern and Western region of Nigeria, all of which include their own coat of arms in the centre of a Nigerian flag. The Eastern Region's coat of arms was based on the colours of the Pan-African flag designed by Marcus Garvey's Universal Negro Improvement Association and African Communities League. As such, the flag of Biafra is similar to other flags which also used Pan-African colours including East African countries such as Kenya and Malawi. It was also the inspiration for the flag of the short-lived Republic of Benin, consisting of the Biafran-occupied Mid-Western region.

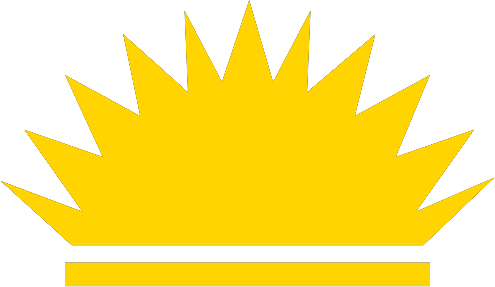
The half sun used on the Biafran flag.

Today these colours are commonly seen to represent: Red for the blood of Biafrans who died during the Nigerian Civil War, the famine during the war, as well as those who died prior to this in the Igbo pogroms in the Northern Region. Black is for the mourning of those who died, while both green and gold represent the prosperity and bright future for Biafrans. The half sun with the eleven rays has become a key part of the iconography of the Igbo people and is often used to represent ethnic or regional pride.

== Legality ==
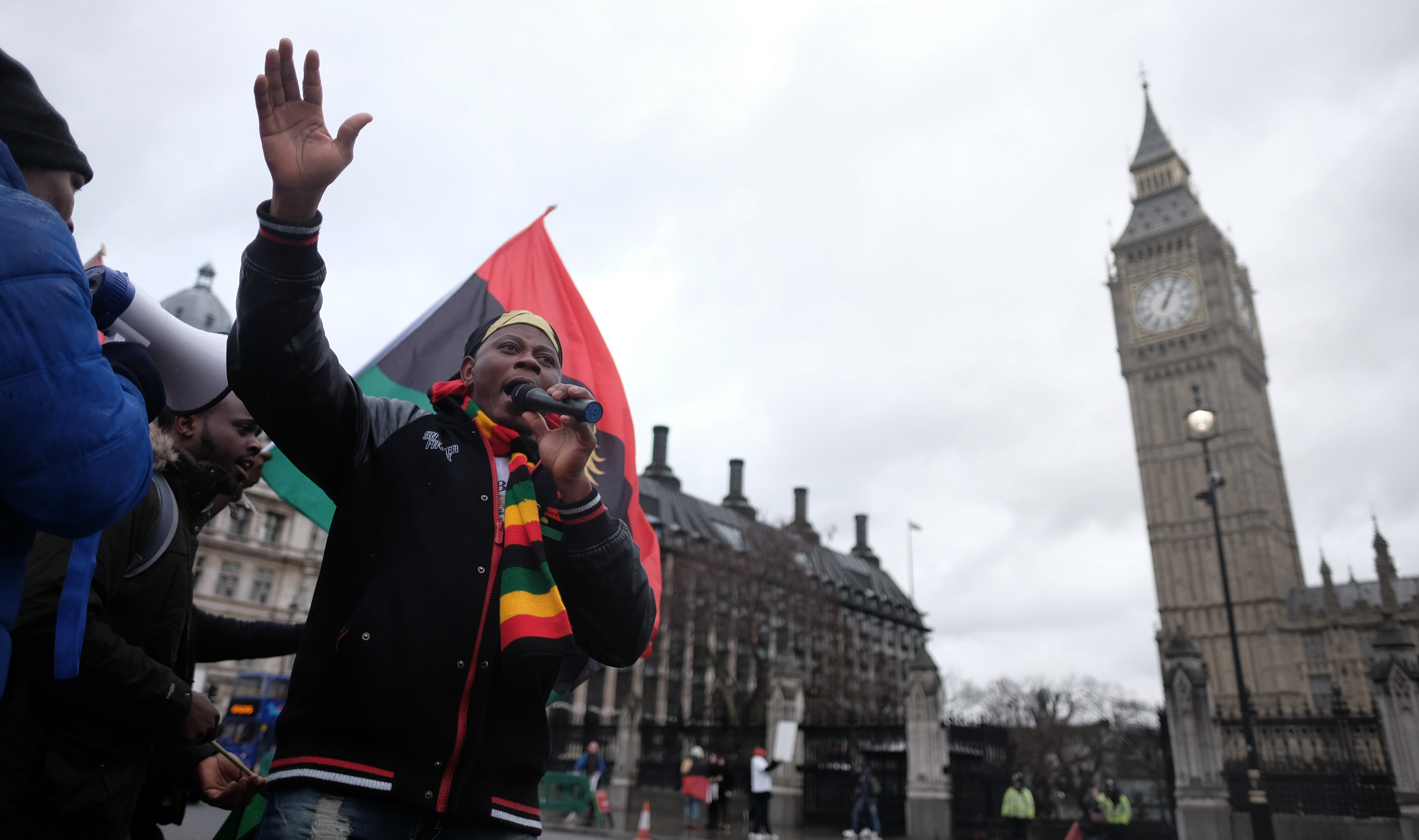
October 2015, Pro-Biafran protests in Westminster, London

Since Nigeria's return to democracy in 1999, after decades of military rule, it has coincided with the resurgence of demands for Igbo self-determination and Biafra secessionist movements. The Nigerian Government considers Biafran separatists as a security threat and routinely attempts to suppress protests and demands for self-determination, including the banning of the Biafran flag. This ban is hard to fully enforce due to the regional nature of Biafran identity, with the support base concentrated in the South-East of Nigeria. In majority Igbo cities such as Aba, Onitsha, Nnewi, Umuahia, Enugu, Asaba, Nsukka, Abakiliki, Owerri and Awka, the Biafran flag can be seen regularly flying on buildings, buses, and flagpoles. These flags are routinely taken down by police during raids, especially surrounding the days around Biafra Remembrance on 30 May. Flags are often replaced soon afterwards which suggests that the ban cannot be fully enforced, making the legality dependent on selective enforcement.

Chima J. Korieh argues that the flag is often a cause of violence between the government and supporters of Biafra stating, "one cannot openly fly the Biafran flag, for example, in Nigeria without fear of reprisal that could lead to arrest and even death". An example of this was the violent protests that occurred on 8 March 2014 outside the Enugu State Government House after an effort to hoist the Biafran flag, resulted in 100 arrests by Nigerian state police. A similar event occurred in Enugu on 5 November 2012, which also resulted in the arrests of 100 people, following a peaceful march through the city after the Biafran flag was raised.

== Modern usage ==
The Biafran flag is still commonly seen in Nigeria today. During a visit to towns and cities across Nigeria in 2010, Historian Ike Okonta expressed his surprise at the number of Biafran flags displayed in public places and the confidence with which the Movement for the Actualization of the Sovereign State of Biafra (MASSOB) officials and its members went about their activities, despite the violence and police brutality they experienced. As a symbol for the support of the recreation of the Biafran state, the flag is also used in most pro-Biafran protests/demonstrations today.

=== Protests ===
Pro-Biafran protests occur both inside and outside of Nigeria, this is largely a result of the notable Igbo diaspora found internationally. Such events usually involve the use of the Biafran flag and similar Biafran iconography. The flag is commonly used by Neo-Biafran groups to promote the recreation of the Biafran state, encouraging people to explore an alternative to the general Igbo identity. Heavy usage of the flag during protests also provides a better possibility for gaining future political independence as it is a clear symbol of the united support of Biafra. MASSOB is an example of a neo-Biafran movement which uses the flag repeatedly during their demonstrations. With the objective of achieving self-determination for the Igbo ethnic group, the Biafran flag has been an important asset to many of MASSOB's protests by invoking the memory of the shared experience many Biafrans had during and after the war.

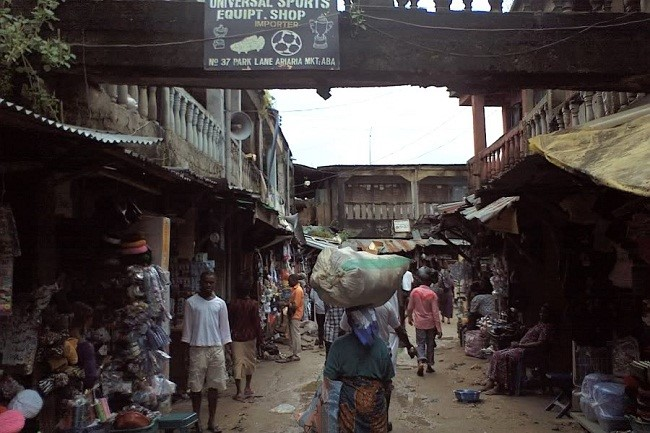
Ariaria Market, 2012

On 22 May 2000, the Biafran flag was hoisted by MASSOB at the Ariaria International Market in Aba. The raising of the flag acted as the symbolic starting point in the renewed efforts of resurrecting the state of Biafra. The envisaged stages toward independence included: Mass mobilisation; establishment of the primary structures of a sovereign state; and a referendum supervised by the UN in the eastern part of Nigeria to determine whether individuals would prefer to remain part of Nigeria or join those who wanted to resurrect Biafra.

The Biafra flag was also raised during a protest in March 2014 by the Biafra Zionist Federation (BZF). This group are a breakaway organisation from MASSOB. BZF took control of the Engugu State Government house for approximately four hours, erecting the flag of Biafra at the entrance. An ultimatum was given to Nigerians living in previous Biafran territory to vacate their land before March 31, 2014, or they would face the 'bloodbath' that was to come afterwards. Despite the groups plans to reclaim all Biafran land by this point, it did not happen and no 'bloodbath' occurred for those who refused to vacate their area.

On 30 May 2016, at least 40 people were killed and more than 50 were injured by the Nigerian Army ahead of the pro-Biafran commemoration events in Onitsha. Evidence from eyewitnesses, confirmed that the Nigerian military opened fire on members of the Indigenous People of Biafra (IPOB), its supporters and bystanders at three locations in the town.

== Popular culture ==
The influence and impact the flag of Biafra can be analysed through popular culture. Lecznar states: "the image of the half yellow sun was the central emblem of the Biafran flag and continues to be a powerful symbol of the hope garnered by the Igbo population after Biafra's secession from Nigeria, but also of the failure of the post-independence Nigerian nation". The 2006 book Half of a Yellow Sun directly references the Biafran flag in regard to the half sun in the flag. In the book, the Biafran flag is referenced throughout: "Odenigbo climbed up to the podium waving his Biafran flag: swaths of red, black, and green and, at the centre, a luminous half of a yellow sun". The book was made into the film Half of a Yellow Sun which was released in 2013. Further influence of the half yellow sun can be seen in the 2003 film by Antoine Fungua's Tears of the Sun. The film was shot in parts of West Africa due to it being set in a Nigerian jungle. The film features many Hollywood mainstream actors.

The branding for Nigeria's Hero Beer features a rising sun referencing the Biafran flag, a horizontal tricolour of red, black, and green with a rising sun in the middle. The phrase "Bring me a Hero" is commonly called in bars of Engugu, where the dreams of raising a glass to "independence" from Nigeria have not been given up.

== See also ==
- Pan-African Flag
- Nigerian Civil War
- Half of a Yellow Sun
- Igboland
- Igbo people
- Biafra

== Bibliography ==
- Adichie, Chimamanda Ngozi, Half of a Yellow Sun. London: HarperCollins Publishers.
- Amnesty International, "Nigeria: Killing of unarmed pro-Biafran supporters by military".
- Ayobola, Alalade, and Ayomola O. Oluranti, "Approaches of MASSOB and IPOB and the Response of Federal Government in the Biafra Secession Movement in Nigeria". Ibadan Journal of Peace and Development 9.2, pp. 150–166.
- BBC, "'Nigeria treats us like slaves' – but is Biafra the answer?". 6 July 2017.
- Julius-Adeoye, Rantimi Jays, "The Nigeria-Biafra war, popular culture and agitation for sovereignty of a Biafran nation", ASC Working Paper Series.
- Korich, Chima J., New Perspectives on the Nigeria-Biafra War: No Victor, No Vanquished. London: Lexington Books.
- Lecznar, Matthew, "(Re)Fashioning Biafra: Identity, Authorship, and the Politics of Dress in Half of a Yellow Sun and Other Narratives of the Nigeria-Biafra War", India University Press. 47.4 pp. 112–132.
- Okonta, Ike, "'Biafra of the mind': MASSOB and the mobilization of history", Journal of Genocide Research. 16.2–3, pp. 355–378.
- Okonkwo, Ivan Emeka, "POLITICAL ACTIVISM IN VISUAL EXPRESSION: IPOB AND THE BIAFRA QUESTION IN THE SOUTH EAST OF NIGERIA". Igwebuike: An African Journal of Arts and Humanities. 4.2. pp. 160–174.
- Onuoha, Godwin, "Cultural interfaces of self-determination and the rise of the neo-Biafran movement in Nigeria". Review of African Political Economy, 40.137, pp. 428–446.
- Onuoha, Godwin, "The presence of the past: youth, memory making and the politics of self-determination in southeastern Nigeria", Ethnic and Racial Studies. 36.12. pp. 2182–2199.
- Ross, William. "The Biafrans who still dream of leaving Nigeria". BBC. 21 December 2012, <>.
- Ugwueze, Michael, I. "Biafra War Documentaries: Explaining Continual Resurgence of Secessionist Agitations in the South-East", Nigeria, Civil Wars, 23.2, pp. 207–233.
- Unah, Linus, "In a Local Beer, a National Hero", EATER, 26 November 2019.
- Vanguard, "We seized Government house for 4 hours- Onwuka".
- WordPress, "Flags, Coats of Arms, Symbols and Monuments of Nigerian States". 6 August 2018.
- Znaimerowski, Alfred, The World Encyclopaedia of Flags. London: Anness Publishing Ltd.
