= Okechukwu Okoye =

Nigerian politician

Okechukwu Okoye was a Nigerian politician who was a member of Anambra State House of Assembly representing Aguata II constituency. He was kidnapped and killed during the May 2022 Anambra State killings. His head was found at Chisco park in Amichi community in Anambra, few days after he was kidnapped.
