= Radio Biafra =

Biafran radio station

- Broadcast area: Worldwide

Programming
- Languages: English, Igbo

Ownership
- Owner: Republic of Biafra

History
- Former frequencies: 97.6 MHz

Links
- Website: radiobiafra.co

Radio Biafra, also known as Voice of Biafra, is a radio station and a trademark that was founded by the defunct Republic of Biafra. It was operated by Mazi Nnamdi Kanu, the IPOB leader and Alphonsus Uche Okafor-Mefor who served as the deputy director. It is believed to have its first transmission before the Nigeria-Biafra war, the radio station was instrumental in the broadcast of speeches and propaganda by Chukwuemeka Odumegwu Ojukwu to the people of the Republic of Biafra.

== Transmission ==
Now based in the United Kingdom, Radio Biafra transmits via the internet and shortwave broadcast targeted to the Eastern Nigeria, with their contents broadcast in English and Igbo. Radio Biafra claims to be broadcasting the ideology of Biafra –"Freedom of the Biafran people".

== Controversy ==
Radio Biafra has been met with mixed reactions. While some critics have criticized the station for "inciting war" through its programmes and "preaching hate messages" against Nigeria which it refers to as a “zoo”, an editor for Sahara Reporters wrote in defence of the radio station after he compared Radio Biafra with the British Broadcasting Corporation Hausa service (BBC Hausa).

On 14 July 2015, it was reported in the media that the radio station had been jammed because it did not have a broadcast licence from the Nigerian Broadcasting Commission. However, the radio station in a swift reaction labelled such claims as "lies" and went on to release its new frequency details to the public.
