= Eastern Security Network =

Paramilitary organization in Nigeria

- Flag of the ESN
- Leaders: Nnamdi Kanu "Commander Ikonso" †
- Allegiance: Biafra (IPOB)
- Ideology: Biafran separatism Anti-Fulani sentiment Anti-Nigerian sentiment
- Size: More than 50,000 soldiers (Nigerian Army sources)

The Eastern Security Network (ESN) is the paramilitary organization of the Indigenous People of Biafra (IPOB), a pro-Biafra separatist movement.

== Background ==
The Biafran people lost the 1967-1970 Nigerian Civil War, during which they attempted to secede (to withdraw) from Nigeria and establish an independent government in Biafra. There remains residual support for the independence of Biafra among the Igbos. Many Igbos, who are mostly Christian, consider that they are disadvantaged under the current, Muslim-dominated Nigerian government.

The Indigenous People of Biafra (IPOB), founded by Nnamdi Kanu, is a currently active separatist movement. According to the Council on Foreign Relations, "[t]he federal government, recalling the civil war, is bitterly opposed to Igbo separatism, as is most of the Igbo establishment. The government has long sought to defang the IPOB and silence Kanu, sometimes through illegal or quasi-legal methods." Since 2017, the IPOB is designated by the Nigerian government as a terrorist organization.

Since August 2020, violence has been escalating between the IPOB and the Nigerian government. In August 2020, Nigerian police forces executed 21 IPOB members at a meeting, with two police officers dead and both siding accused each other of firing the first shot. Violence escalated during the following months, leading to a region-wide insurgency.

== History ==
=== Formation ===
IPOB launched the 'Eastern Security Network' in December early 2020, as a reaction to the Igbo's perception that they are targeted by Muslim Fulani herders, whom they accuse of grazing on farmlands and committing crimes like raping and killings against local residents. The movement then morphed into a paramilitary unit with broader functions because the paramilitary forces was incapacitated.

The Nigerian government saw the ESN as a threat to its authority and deployed the army to locate and destroy ESN bases. In January 2021, intense fighting broke out in the town of Orlu, in Imo State. The military confrontation lasted for seven days, until ESN declared a unilateral ceasefire and both sides withdrew from the city.

Shortly after the Orlu Crisis, IPOB gave all the governors of southeast Nigeria 14 days to ban open grazing, threatening to deploy the ESN to enforce a ban if the authorities did not do so. However, the ESN did not wait 14 days; a few days later, ESN operatives attacked a Fulani camp in Isuikwuato, Abia State, killing their livestock and burning down their houses. Following the raid, some governors responded by heeding the ESN's call and banning open grazing.

IPOB accused the Nigerian Army of working in collaboration with the governor of Imo state to continue the harassment and intimidation of civilians in Orlu and environs, especially the arrest of a Rabbi and his family members, whom it was reported were being tortured. Beginning from 15 February, there were reports of the Nigerian army sending reinforcements to Orlu. On the 18th of February 2021, Nigeria Military launched an airstrike in Orlu, Imo state. IPOB issued a swift statement through its State Directorate asserting that "they have finally brought the war upon the Biafran people."

=== 2021 ===
In response to the deaths of at least 20 security personnel in the region in early 2021 due to attacks by unknown gunmen, including the destruction of 3 police stations, Nigerian forces raided an ESN camp in Aba, Abia, on the night of March 23, 2021. The Nigerian force, numbering in the hundreds, captured the camp and claimed to have killed 16 ESN fighters. On 29 March, the Nigerian police reported arresting 16 ESN members suspected of attacking security personnel.

On April 5, 2021, at around 2 AM, a prison in Owerri, Imo State, was attacked by gunmen alleged to be ESN operatives using explosives to open the administrative buildings, setting 1844 prisoners free while prison officials fled. The Nigerian police blamed the attack on the Eastern Security Network while on the hand, IPOB denied any involvement. An attempt to enter the armoury at the nearby police headquarters was deterred. The following day, six of the escaped prisoners voluntarily returned to the prison.

== See also ==
- Operation Amotekun
