= 2014 Enugu Government House attack =

2014 militant attack in Enugu, Nigeria

2014 Enugu Government House Attack
- Location: Enugu State
- Goals: To reinstate the State of Biafra

Lead figures
Benjamin Onwuka	

On 8 March 2014, members of the militant group Biafra Zionist Federation took control of the state house for about four hours and erected the flag of Biafra at the entrance of the house. The leader of the group Barrister Benjamin Onwuka gave Nigerians living in Biafran territory an ultimatum to vacate their land before 31 March 2014 or face the bloodbath that will come afterward.

It was initially reported that the pro-Biafra militant group MASSOB was responsible for the attack, but this was later discarded after BZF claimed responsibility for the attack. Benjamin Onwuka was arrested by the Nigeria Police Force after attempting to carry out a similar attack on Enugu State Broadcasting Service.

== See also ==
- 2014 Enugu State Broadcasting Service attack
