= Anti-Nigerian sentiment =

Prejudice towards Nigeria or Nigerian people

Anti-Nigerian sentiment is the dislike of Nigeria or Nigerians.

== Biafra and the Nigerian Civil War ==
Anti-Nigerian sentiment arose among Igbo people during the Nigerian Civil War of 1967–1970, when the predominately Igbo region seceded from Nigeria and attempted to establish an independent Republic of Biafra. In the 1969 Ahiara Declaration, Biafran president Chukwuemeka Odumegwu Ojukwu stated, "The Federation of Nigeria is today as corrupt, as unprogressive and as oppressive and irreformable as the Ottoman Empire was in Eastern Europe over a century ago. And in contrast, the Nigerian Federation in the form it was constituted by the British cannot by any stretch of imagination be considered an African necessity. Yet we are being forced to sacrifice our very existence as a people to the integrity of that ramshackle creation that has no justification either in history or in the freely expressed wishes of the people." Although Biafra was defeated and reintegrated into Nigeria, various Biafran nationalist groups such as Indigenous People of Biafra and Movement for the Actualization of the Sovereign State of Biafra continue the goal of seceding from Nigeria.

== Kenya ==
Kenyan police arrested two Nigerian nationals following the discovered death of a Kenyan woman on 14 January 2024. The arrests led to a public campaign among Kenyan citizens to deport Nigerians from the country.

== South Africa ==
Since the end of apartheid in 1994, Nigerians and other foreign nationals began migrating to South Africa in large numbers. This has led to xenophobic sentiments among Black South Africans due to scarce economic opportunities. Nigerians are among the common targets of xenophobia in South Africa. The portrayal of Nigerians as illegal drug dealers has often been used to justify xenophobic violence towards Nigerians in South Africa. On 18 October 2007, South African musician Lucky Dube was shot dead because his assailants allegedly mistook him for a Nigerian.

The 2009 South African science fiction film District 9 faced controversy for its alleged negative portrayal of Nigerians. Nigeria's Information Minister Dora Akunyili asked movie cinemas around Nigeria to either ban the film or edit out specific references to the country because of the film's negative depiction of the Nigerian characters as criminals and cannibals. Letters of complaint were sent to the producer and distributor of the film demanding an apology. She also said the gang leader Obesandjo is almost identical in spelling and pronunciation to the surname of former Nigerian president Olusegun Obasanjo. The film was later banned in Nigeria; the Nigerian Film and Video Censors Board was asked to prevent cinemas from showing the film and also to confiscate it. Hakeem Kae-Kazim, a Nigerian-born British actor, also criticised the portrayal of Nigerians in the film.

During the 2019 Johannesburg riots, shops owned by Nigerians and other foreign nationals were attacked and looted, following the death of a taxi driver. By 3 September, police had made 189 arrests for looting. Around 50 businesses predominantly owned by Nigerians were reportedly destroyed or damaged during the incident. The riots coincided with a nationwide truck driver strike protesting against the employment of non-South African truckers. After riots resulted in 12 deaths in the first week of September, 640 of an estimated 100,000 Nigerians in South Africa signed up to take free flights offered by Nigeria to return to their home country.

== United States ==
During the Nigerian Civil War, Biafran officials collaborated with American politicians and public relations firms to spread anti-Nigerian sentiments among Americans. The American Committee to Keep Biafra Alive widely propagated negative images of Nigeria and made disputed assertions that Nigeria was committing a mass genocide in Biafra.
