= Indigenous People of Biafra =

Separatist group in Nigeria

- Abbreviation: IPOB
- Leader: Nnamdi Kanu
- Founders: Nnamdi Kanu
- Founded: 2012
- Ideology: Anti-Fulani sentiment; Anti-Yoruba sentiment; Anti-Muslim sentiment; Anti-Nigerian sentiment; Biafran separatism; Igbo nationalism; Nativism
- Colours: Red, black, green and yellow

Party flag

Website
- ipobinusa.org

The Indigenous People of Biafra (IPOB) is a separatist organisation in Nigeria that aims to restore the defunct Republic of Biafra, which seceded from Nigeria in 1967 before the Nigerian Civil War and was dissolved after its defeat in 1970. Since 2021, IPOB and other Biafran separatist groups have been fighting a low-level guerrilla conflict in southeastern Nigeria against the Nigerian government. The group was founded in 2012 by Nnamdi Kanu, who has been its leader, and Uche Mefor, who served as deputy leader.

Kanu is a British political activist known for his advocacy of the contemporary Biafran independence movement. IPOB was declared a terrorist organisation by the Nigerian government in 2017 under the Nigerian Terrorism Act. However, the declaration was nullified by a High Court sitting in Enugu in 2023. The Abuja Division of the Court of Appeal upheld the federal government's 2017 proscription of IPOB as a terrorist group. As of May 2022, the United Kingdom had denied asylum to members of IPOB alleged to have engaged in human rights abuses, though the UK government clarified that IPOB had not been designated as a terrorist organisation in the UK.

IPOB has accused the Nigerian federal government of poor investment, political alienation, inequitable resource distribution, ethnic marginalisation, a heavy military presence, and extrajudicial killings in southeastern, south-central, and parts of north-central Nigeria. IPOB rose to prominence in the mid-2010s and has been described as the largest Biafran independence organisation by membership. In recent years, it has received media attention as a frequent target of political crackdowns by the Nigerian government. It has numerous websites and communication channels.

== Background ==
Biafra was a partially recognised, multi-ethnic republic with a primarily Igbo population. It was established by Lieutenant Colonel Odumegwu Ojukwu in 1967 and dissolved in 1970. Biafra fought the Nigerian government in the Nigerian Civil War over its attempted secession. There were an estimated 1 million to 3.5 million deaths, with many Biafran civilian casualties caused by starvation. Biafran forces surrendered in 1970 following an armistice brokered by the defunct Organisation of African Unity.

The Movement for the Actualization of the Sovereign State of Biafra (MASSOB) was formed in 1999 by its national leader Ralph Uwazuruike, and began gaining attention in the early 2000s. However, the organisation was weakened by alleged state repression and internal disagreements over leadership. MASSOB accused Uwazuruike of associating himself with "mainstream Nigerian politics" instead of furthering the cause of Biafra. These conflicts contributed to the formation of another faction, the Biafra Zionist Movement (BZM), which gained attention. BZM leader Benjamin Igwe Onwuka and many members of the group were arrested for treason by the Nigerian government at a rally in Enugu on 5 November 2012. BZM's activities were scaled down because of the arrests and trials of many leading members of the organisation. Both pro-Biafran groups helped set the stage for the rise of IPOB, which continued to advocate similar causes.

== Leadership ==
The leader of the Indigenous People of Biafra is Nnamdi Kanu, a dual British and Nigerian citizen. He created IPOB after becoming known for his broadcasts on Radio Biafra, which was established in 2009. The London-based radio station broadcast messages calling for the "freedom of Biafrans" and criticised corruption in the Nigerian government. Radio Biafra helped raise Kanu's public profile, as he had previously been little known. Kanu was arrested by Nigerian security forces on 19 October 2015, on charges of "sedition, ethnic incitement and treasonable felony." Kanu left Nigeria in 2017 while on bail, but was rearrested in June 2021 and brought back to Nigeria.

Following Kanu's second arrest in June 2021, he appointed Simon Ekpa as the lead broadcaster of Radio Biafra and spokesperson for IPOB pending his release. Ekpa later disputed Kanu's continued leadership of the movement while Kanu was imprisoned. By late 2022, other IPOB leaders, including media and publicity secretary Emma Powerful, had publicly denounced Ekpa.

== Mission ==
According to Indigenous People of Biafra USA, IPOB's objective is "to restore our precolonial independence and the sovereign state we declared before the Biafran genocide." The group states that it seeks to define its own policies, laws, standards, and values, and that it "seek[s] no middle ground".

== Protests ==
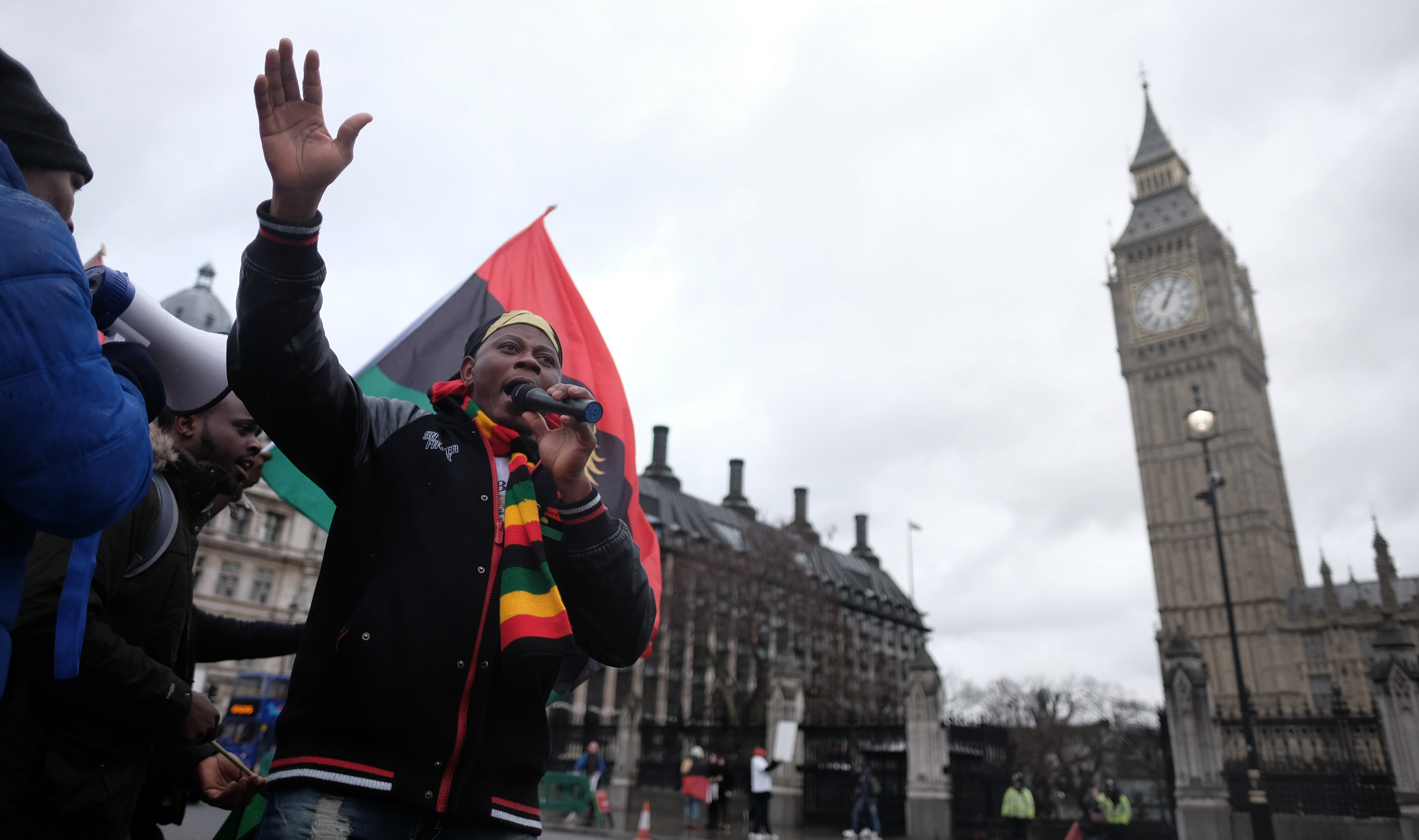
IPOB protest calling for the release of Nnamdi Kanu

Following Nnamdi Kanu's arrest by Nigeria's Department of State Services on 19 October 2015, pro-Biafran protesters held marches in eastern Nigeria calling for his release. His arrest was followed by increased mobilisation among IPOB supporters. On 2 December 2015, nine protesters and two police officers were killed after protesters and police clashed in Onitsha, Anambra State. Since then, protesters have reportedly been killed by policemen in Aba, Onitsha, Enugu, and Umuahia.

After Nnamdi Kanu was extradited from Kenya, IPOB called on Biafran supporters to observe a "sit-at-home" protest, as well as on days when Kanu appears in court. On 21 July 2023, Kanu cancelled the sit-at-home order through his lawyer and IPOB's media and publicity secretary, Emma Powerful.

Some IPOB supporters cited the 2016 election of President Donald Trump and the United Kingdom's vote to leave the European Union as indications of international support for self-determination. IPOB figures argued that support for Biafran secession could align with United States economic interests because of instability affecting oil production in the Niger Delta. However, Trump has made no public statement in support of Biafran self-determination.

Protesters called for the release of Nnamdi Kanu and other jailed Biafran activists. They also called on the government to set a date for an independence referendum. Nnabuike Nnadede, editor of the pro-Biafran media outlet Voice of Biafra, stated that the Igbo people had suffered from a lack of resources and investment from the Nigerian government. The protesters said they wanted the opportunity to vote for independence.

== State response and treatment ==
On 18 September 2017, the Federal High Court in Abuja declared IPOB a isation. IPOB challenged this proscription in 2018 and sought to reverse the court's decision. In 2023, a High Court sitting in Enugu State declared the proscription unconstitutional, nullified it, and awarded 8 billion Nigerian naira in damages.

The Nigerian state has been accused of using excessive force against pro-Biafran movements. Allegations of police violence have been made since 2014, first targeting MASSOB and then IPOB after its formation. In 2008, MASSOB claimed that 2,020 of its members had been extrajudicially killed by the state. Amnesty International released a report detailing that multiple IPOB protesters were killed on 29 and 30 May 2016 during a governmental operation to prevent IPOB members from marching from Nkpor motor park to a rally. The Nigerian army said that it acted in self-defense and that the death toll was five rather than fifty. These killings have not been investigated by the Nigerian government, despite urgings from Amnesty International to do so.

Human rights organisations monitoring extrajudicial killings in Biafra claimed that from August 2015 through February 2016, 170 unarmed civilians were killed, and 400 were arrested, charged or detained without trial.

== Kanu's trial and detention ==
IPOB leader Nnamdi Kanu failed to appear in court after 25 April 2017 to answer charges brought by the federal government. He had previously been detained without trial for over a year and was arraigned on 8 November 2016 on charges of criminal conspiracy, membership of an illegal organisation, and intimidation. In April 2017, leaders at the World Igbo Summit Group demanded Kanu's release, citing judicial concerns that Kanu needed medical attention unavailable in prison.^{<source?>} Kanu was subsequently granted bail, with conditions barring him from interviews, meeting with more than ten people, and organising and attending rallies or social functions.

Kanu's whereabouts were unknown after September 2017, following an alleged attack on his home in Umuahia by combined air force and army units. In a Radio Biafra broadcast, he claimed that his disappearance was because President Muhammadu Buhari had sent the military to execute him at his home. The military denied that the raid occurred, while reports cited video footage of the incident. There was speculation that Kanu had fled to Israel after a Facebook livestream appeared to show a person resembling him praying at the Western Wall in Jerusalem. The Israeli foreign ministry said it could not confirm that Kanu was in the country.

The court revoked Kanu's bail, and the trial judge Binta Nyako ordered his immediate arrest. On 29 June 2021, the Nigerian government announced that Nnamdi Kanu had been rearrested. He was subsequently charged and remanded in the custody of the Department of State Services.

== 2020–21 clashes ==
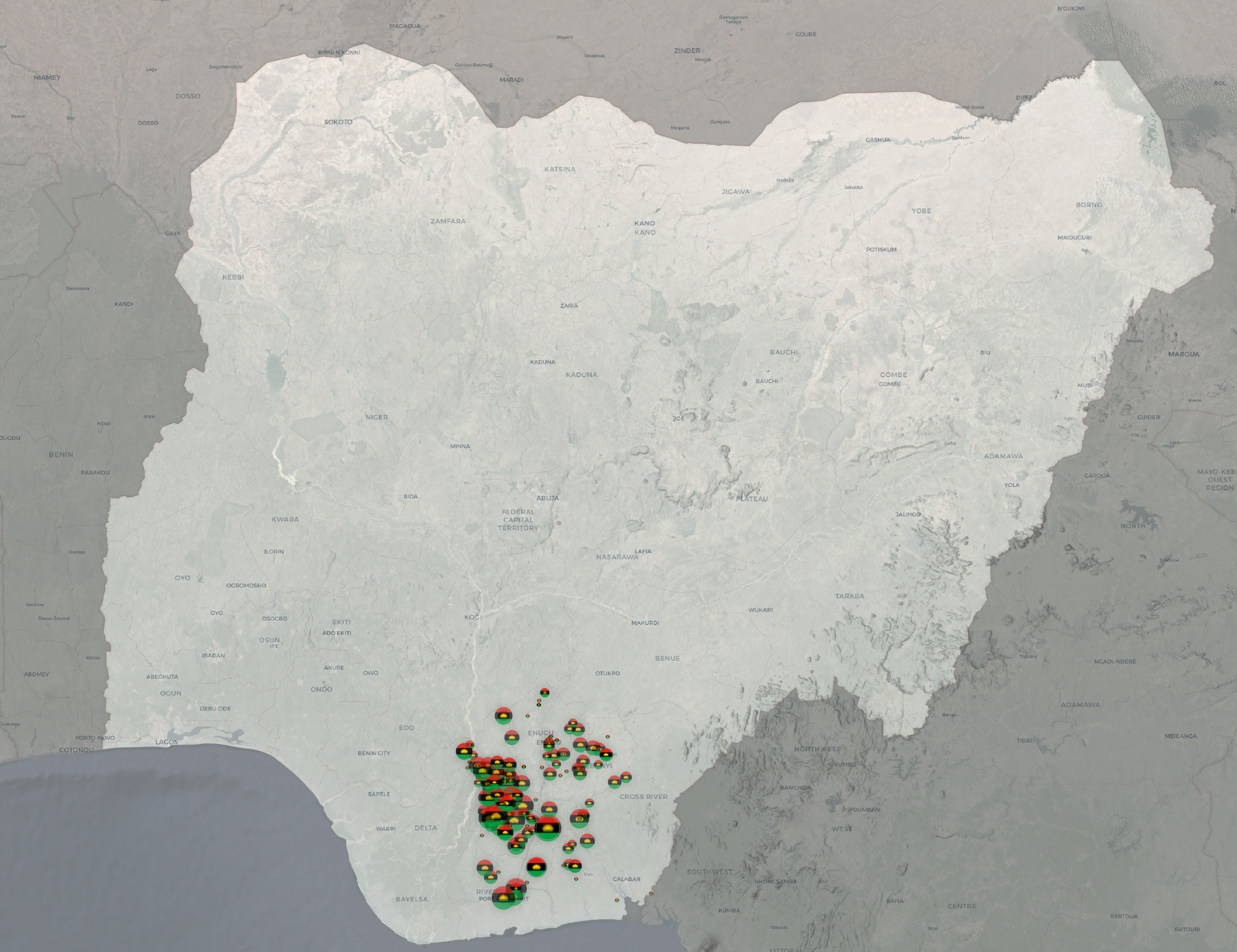
The location of political violence involving Indigenous Peoples of Biafra in Nigeria, 2015–2023, according to ACLED data

In August 2020, IPOB accused the Department of State Services (DSS) of killing 21 of its members and arresting 47 others at several locations. The DSS said that two of its officers were killed by IPOB members. Both sides accused the other of firing first and said they had been attacked without provocation. The casualty figures have not been independently verified. Following the incident, IPOB vowed to retaliate and called on its members to practice self-defense.

On 12 December 2020, Kanu announced the formation of the Eastern Security Network (ESN), a regional security force that he said was intended to remove bandits and illegal forest occupants who clashed with farmers in Biafran territory. The Nigerian Army deployed to locate ESN camps two weeks later. On 22 January 2021, Nigerian soldiers entered Orlu to search for ESN operatives. Eight buildings were burnt and one person was killed in the ensuing events. Security forces returned to the area three days later, clashing with the ESN and killing at least five people before being repulsed by the ESN. Four Nigerian soldiers were also killed in the fighting. The Nigerian Army withdrew, and in the following days, Nigerian Air Force planes and helicopters were deployed to search for ESN operatives in Orlu and the surrounding area. Before the Nigerian Army launched another attack, Kanu ordered the ESN to cease fire and withdraw from Orlu, which ended the attacks.

Shortly after the Orlu crisis, IPOB issued a 14-day ultimatum to the governors of southeast Nigeria to ban open grazing, threatening to deploy the ESN to enforce a ban if the authorities did not do so.

On 9 April 2021, IPOB announced an alliance with the Ambazonia Governing Council (AGovC) and the Ambazonia Defence Forces. The alliance was denounced by the Interim Government of Ambazonia and by other Biafran separatist groups.

According to a BBC News Pidgin report, the Nigerian Army raided IPOB headquarters and seized weapons in a joint operation with State Services and Intelligence Response Team operatives. Government officials described the operation as a success.

IPOB militants have been accused of killing civilians, including children, with one reported attack being the May 2022 Anambra State killings.

== Activities outside Nigeria ==
=== United States ===
IPOB has sought support from the pro-Trump political movement in the United States, and IPOB leader Nnamdi Kanu attended a Donald Trump rally in Iowa after receiving an invitation from the Republican Party of Iowa.

The Trump administration designated Nigeria as a Country of Particular Concern. Nigerian journalist Garba Shehu alleged that the designation resulted from IPOB funding right-wing American lobbyists to influence United States foreign policy towards Nigeria. Bruce Fein, a conservative American lawyer, has spoken out in support of IPOB and Nnamdi Kanu.

The Biden administration later reversed the designation of Nigeria as a country violating religious freedom. The decision was criticised by Christian and right-wing groups and lawmakers in the United States.

== See also ==
- Radio Biafra
- Republic of Biafra
- Nigerian Civil War
- The Flag of Biafra
- Igbo people
- Movement for the Emancipation of the Niger Delta
- Niger Delta People's Volunteer Force
- Movement for the Actualization of the Sovereign State of Biafra
- Biafra Liberation Army
