= Anti-Yoruba sentiment =

Prejudice against the Yoruba people

Anti-Yoruba sentiment describes bigotry, hatred, discrimination and prejudice against the Yoruba people. Anti-Yoruba sentiment has been rife on social media, including the sites Twitter and Nairaland. Some of the issues start from political discourse and anti ethnic supremacy, used as underhanded ways to push anti Yoruba sentiment. Claims that the Yorubas are "the most tribalistic" to rhetorics and propaganda of Yoruba supremacy are key elements of the attacks.

== History ==
Anti-Yoruba sentiment is recorded before the 21st century. In the book Power and Privilege at an African University, academic Pierre L. van den Berghe notes that during that period the Yorubas were marginalize and "the cleavage between the Ibos and the Yorubas". Yorubas were in political subordination, with Igbos 'with the "minorities" and most of the expartriates tending to side with the Ibo and to "gang up" against the Yorubas.
