= List of populated places in Nigeria =

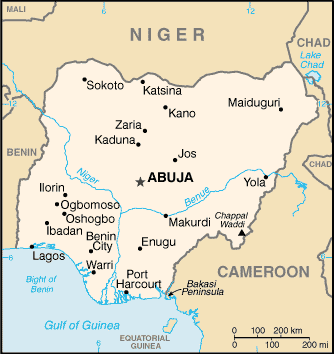
Map of Nigeria

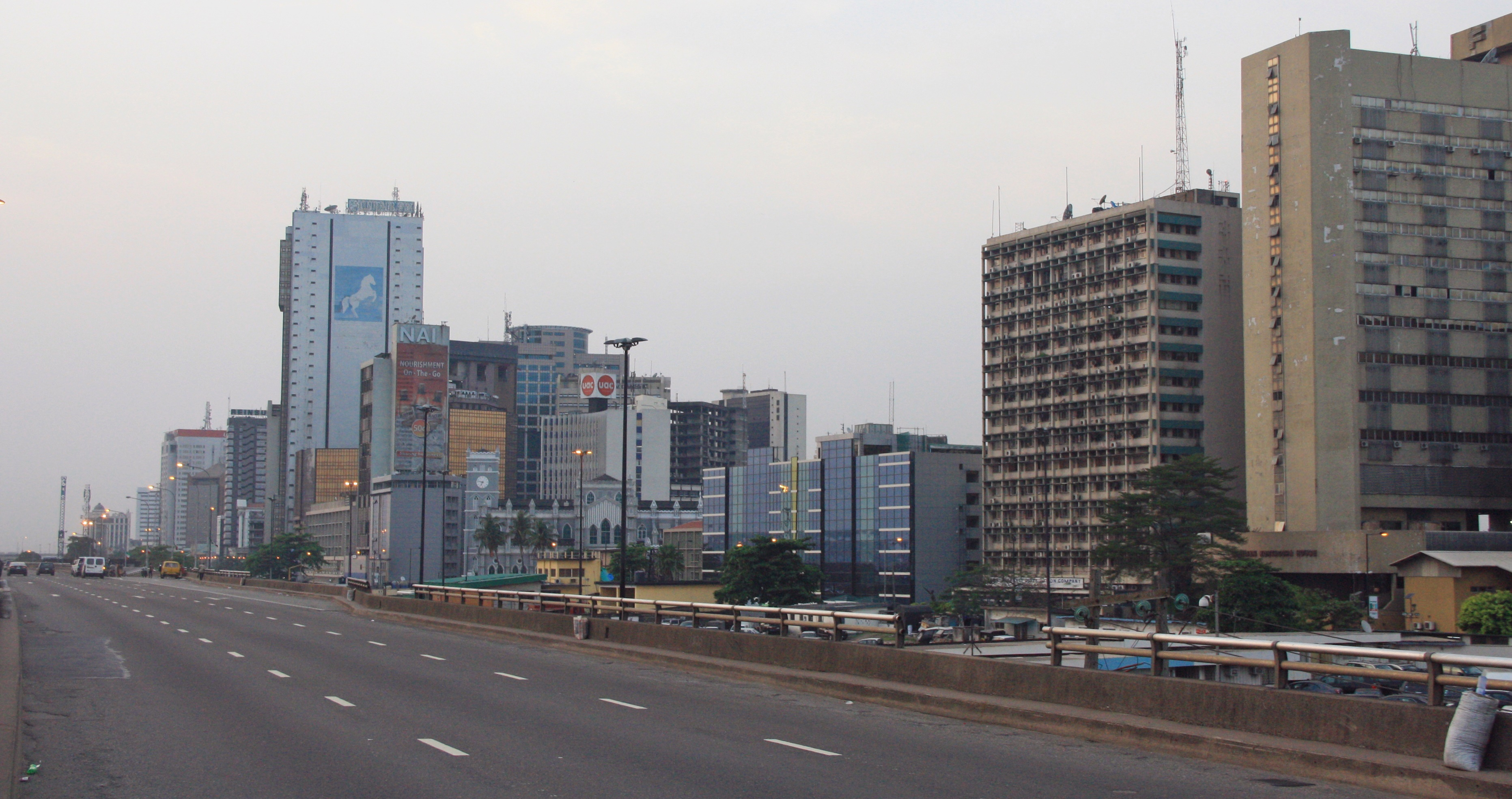
Lagos, Lagos

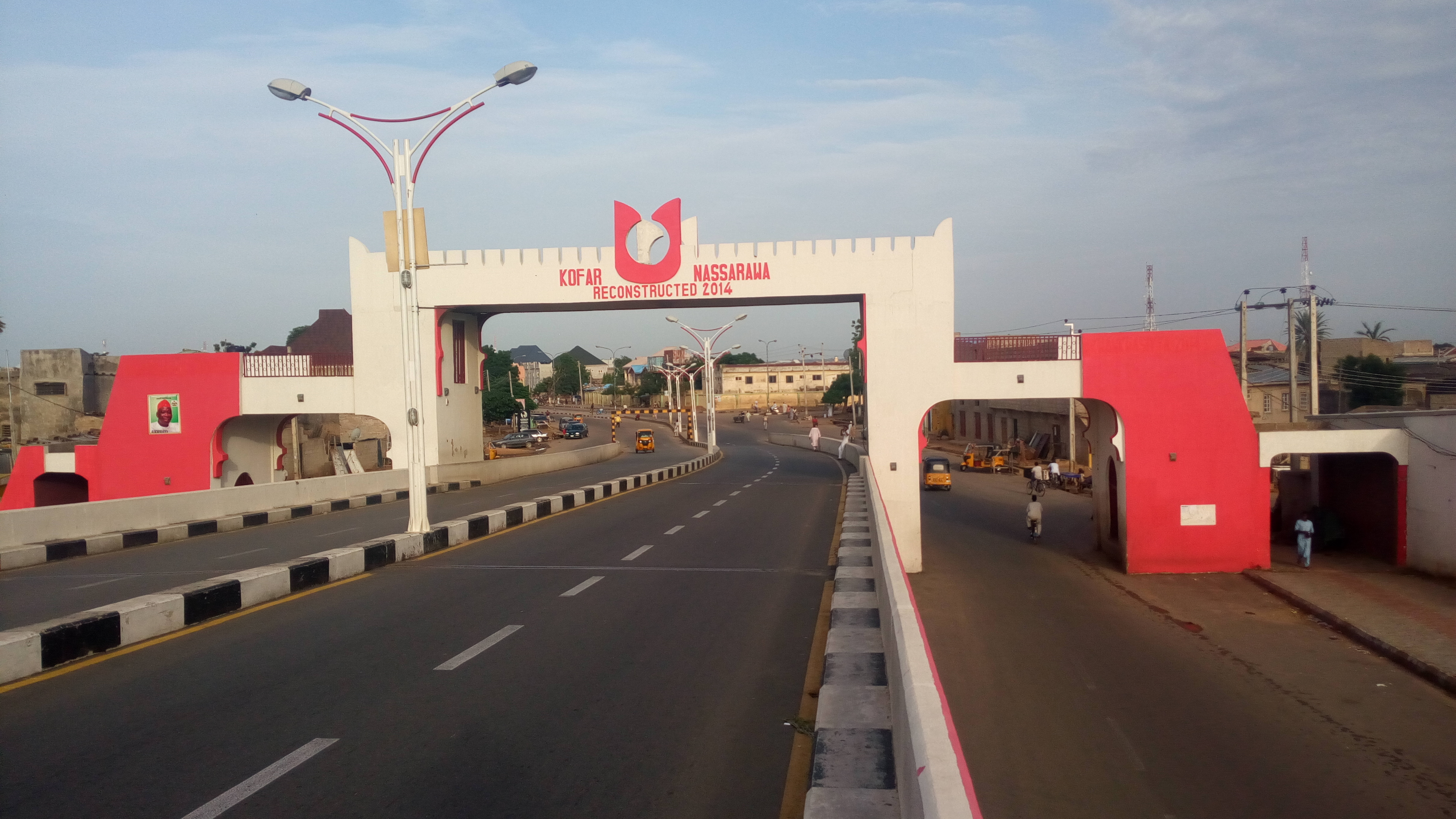
Kano, Kano State, second-most populous city by census 2006

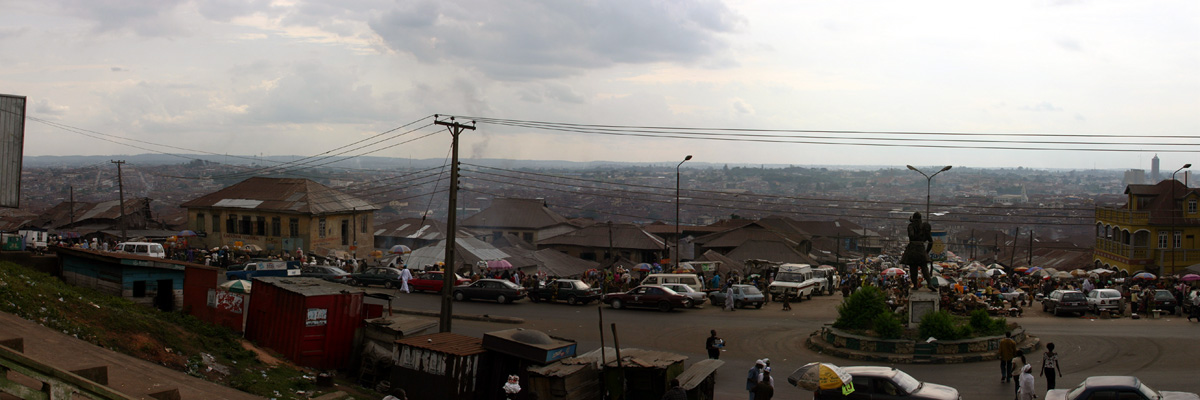
Ibadan, Oyo State, third-most populous

This is a list of populated places in Nigeria. Cities in bold are among the 18 most populous in the country (covered in more detail at List of Nigerian cities by population):

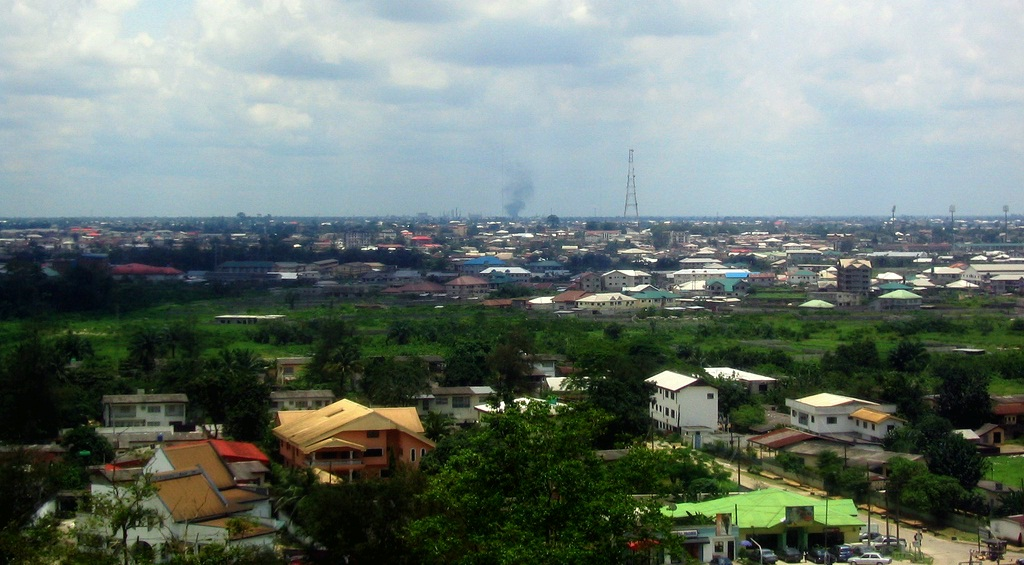
Port Harcourt City Center, Rivers State, fourth-most populous

== Cities ==
- **Aba**
- Abakaliki
- **Abeokuta**
- Abonnema
- **Abuja**
- Ado Ekiti
- Afikpo
- Agbor
- Akpawfu
- Akure
- Asaba
- Auchi
- Awgu
- Awka
- Bauchi
- Batagarawa
- **Benin City**
- Bida
- Birnin Kebbi
- Buguma
- **Calabar**
- Damaturu
- Dutse
- Ede
- Eket
- **Enugu**
- Gombe
- Gusau
- **Ibadan**
- **Ife**
- Ikeja
- Ikirun
- Ikot-Abasi
- Ikot Ekpene
- **Ilorin**
- Iwo
- Jalingo
- Jebba
- Jimeta
- **Jos**
- Kabba
- **Kaduna**
- **Kano**
- Katsina
- Karu
- Kontagora
- Kutigi
- Kumariya
- Lafia
- **Lagos**
- Lekki
- Lokoja
- **Maiduguri**
- Makurdi
- Minna
- Nnewi
- Nsukka
- Offa
- Ogbomoso
- **Onitsha**
- Okene
- Ogaminana
- Omu-Aran
- Ondo City
- Oron
- Oshogbo
- Owerri
- Owo
- Orlu
- Oyo
- **Port Harcourt**
- Potiskum
- Sapele
- Sokoto
- Suleja
- Ughelli
- Umuahia
- Uromi
- Uyo
- **Warri**
- Wukari
- Yenagoa
- Yola
- **Zaria**

== See also ==
- List of Nigerian cities by population
- Lists of villages in Nigeria
