= Nnamdi Kanu =

Nigerian political activist (born 1967)

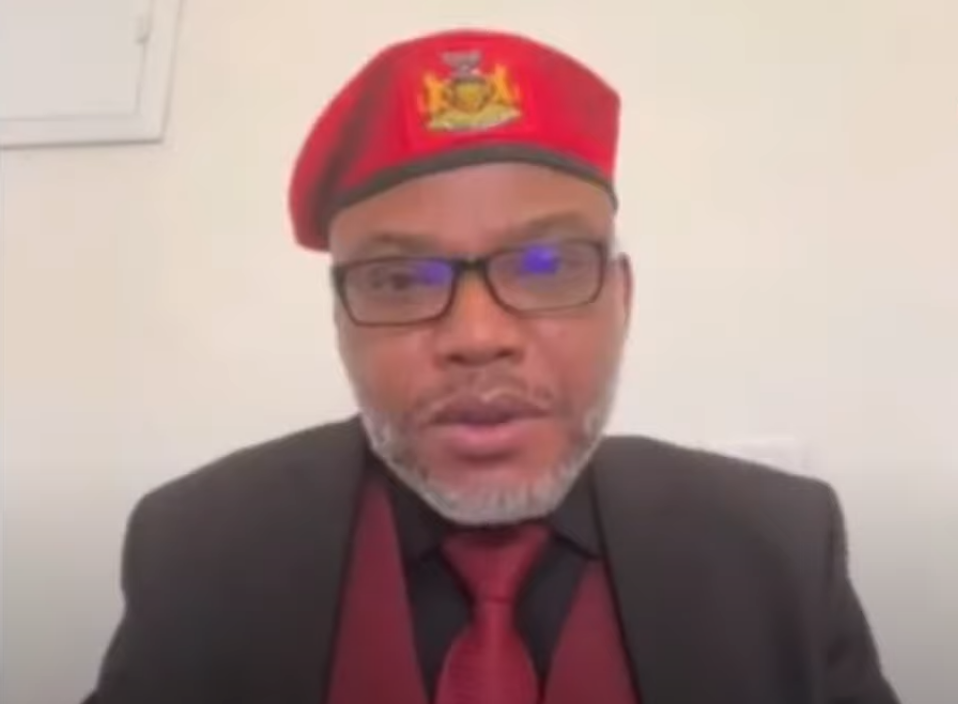
- Kanu in 2021
- Born: Nwannekaenyi Nnamdi Okwu Kanu; 25 September 1967 (age 59); Isiama Afara, Biafra
- Citizenship: British
- Education: University of Nigeria, Nsukka
- Occupation: Political activist
- Notable work: Radio Biafra
- Movement: Indigenous People of Biafra
- Spouse: Uchechi Okwu Kanu

Nnamdi Okwu Kanu (// born 25 September 1967) is a British political activist. He is known for advocating for the independence of Biafra from Nigeria. He is the leader and founder of the Indigenous People of Biafra (IPOB), which he founded in 2012, to restore the defunct State of Biafra which existed in Nigeria's Eastern Region during the Nigerian Civil War. He was convicted on terrorism charges.

Kanu was the director of Radio Biafra when he began propagating Biafran separatism. He was arrested on treason charges in Lagos on 14 October 2015 but remained detained even after court orders while wearing a Jewish prayer shawl and head covering. He is an Igbo Jew, and he has led his Biafran people to various Jewish prayers and religious observations on different occasions. On 28 April 2017, Kanu was released from prison on bail. Nigerian security forces attempted to quash IPOB's armed wing, the Eastern Security Network, which culminated in a low-level conflict in early 2021. Despite the fighting, Kanu maintained that IPOB was interested in a peaceful solution and achieving Biafran independence without violence or harm. In June 2021, he was widely reported to have been allegedly re-arrested by Interpol in Kenya and handed over to Nigeria but in April 2024, Interpol denied any involvement in the arrest and consequent rendition to Nigeria.

In 2025, he was sentenced to life imprisonment on terrorism charges.

== Early life ==
Kanu was born 25 September 1967 in Isiama Afara Ukwu, Umuahia — within the claimed territory of the Republic of Biafra — a few months after it had declared independence from Nigeria. His father, Eze Israel Okwu Kanu (JP), and his mother, Ugoeze Nnenne Kanu, were Nigerian traditional monarchs of the Igbo ethnic group. He attended Library Avenue Primary School and went to Government College Umuahia for his secondary education. He studied at University of Nigeria, Nsukka and moved to the UK before graduating, settling in London.

== Early activism ==
Kanu began his activism for the freedom of Biafra as a Radio Biafra director and anchor of Biafra awareness under Ralph Uwazuruike, leader of the Movement for the Actualisation of Sovereign State of Biafra (MASSOB), who said while in a meeting in Kaduna, Nigeria on 12 June 2014, that he handed over Radio Biafra to Nnamdi Kanu, leader of IPOB but Kanu disappointed him. Radio Biafra however, was established by the defunct Biafran government in 1967 with the aim of championing the Biafran cause. Kanu was a relatively obscure figure until 2009 when he started Radio Biafra, a station that called for an independent state for the Igbo people and broadcast to Nigeria from London. In 2014, he founded IPOB. On 5 September 2015, Nnamdi Kanu was a guest speaker at the World Igbo Congress which was held in Los Angeles, where he told his audience "we need guns and we need bullets".

== Imprisonment ==
=== Arrest ===
On 18 October 2015, it was reported that Kanu had been arrested in Lagos State by Nigeria's secret police, the Department of State Services (DSS). Kanu had told his solicitors that on 14 October 2015, he was arrested by the agents of the Federal Government of Nigeria, the State Security Service (SSS), in his hotel room at the Golden Tulip Essential Hotel Ikeja, Lagos State. The solicitors in a press briefing said, between 14 and 17 October 2015 their client's whereabouts were unknown until 18 October 2015, when the press media broke the news of his arrest and detention by the SSS in Abuja. The news of the arrest of Kanu generated protests across Delta State, Enugu State, Rivers State, Cross River State, Abia State, Imo State, Akwa Ibom State, Bayelsa State and Anambra State.

=== Detention ===
On 19 October 2015, it was reported that Nnamdi Kanu had been granted bail after a secret arraignment at Magistrate Court, Wuse 11. However, the bail seemed "controversial" and there were claims the DSS announced the bail only "to calm the angry people of Biafra".

=== Court jurisdiction ===
The Magistrate Court 1 sitting in Abuja on 18 November 2015 ordered the Department of State Services (DSS) to produce Kanu at the court on 23 November 2015. However, it was reported the Department of State Services (DSS) obtained a "secret court order to detain Nnamdi Kanu". Kanu's lawyer, Vincent Obetta, in an interview said whilst in court, the prosecutor gave him a document containing a court order permitting the Department of State Services (DSS) to detain Kanu for the next three months to "conclude what they said was an investigation of terrorism and terrorism financing".

=== Court trial ===
Kanu was finally arraigned on 23 November 2015 in an Abuja Magistrate Court for the first time for charges of "criminal conspiracy, intimidation and membership of an illegal organisation" by Nigeria's Department of State Services (DSS). The charges violate "Section 97, 97B and 397" of Nigeria's penal code. Chief Magistrate S. Usman had, at the last adjourned date, berated the Department of State Services (DSS) over its failure to produce Kanu in court on the two consecutive times the matter came up before the court. Meanwhile, Kanu's supporters stormed Nigeria's capital city of Abuja in luxury buses on a peaceful protest for their leader who was arraigned by the Federal Government before the Wuse Zone 2 Magistrate Court, Abuja on 23 November 2015. Pro-Biafra protesters with placards sang and danced outside the court premises whilst the hearing proceeded. Protesters wore T-shirts and caps with inscriptions like "Biafra Now or Never", "Buhari Release Kanu For Us", "On Biafra We Stand". More protests by IPOB members numbering over 15,000 grounded vehicular movements in the southeastern key economic city of Onitsha concurrently. It was the same with over 20,000 protesters in Aba, Abia State on the same day.

Kanu, through his counsel, filed an application asking the federal authorities to transfer him from the custody of the Department of State Services (DSS) to prison. His lawyer, Obetta, insisted that transferring his client to prison would enable him to have easy access to his legal team.

Whilst in court, the Department of State Services (DSS) requested the Wuse Zone 2 Senior Magistrates' Court, to discontinue the trial of Nnamdi Kanu under section 108(1) of administration of criminal justice act 2015. Idakwo further said the Department of State Services (DSS) had obtained an order from the Federal High Court, Abuja, dated 10 November, to detain the accused in its custody for 90 days. However, Kanu's lawyer Obetta objected to the continued detention of his client. Obetta prayed the court not to discontinue the case because the prosecution did not present any information from the Attorney-General of Nigeria Federation who had the authority to approve such. Obetta also told the court that "the DSS violated the order of the court which granted bail that was perfected but not granted, adding that the accused had been in Department of State Services (DSS) custody since he was arrested." The court's magistrate, Usman Shuaibu, after listening to both counsels, adjourned the matter until 1 December 2015 for ruling.

The IPOB leader's counsel, Kanu Agabi, had expressed concerns about his client's deteriorating health, citing medical reports that revealed liver and pancreatic complications, a lump under his armpit, and low potassium levels.

However, Nigeria Medical Association report on Nnamdi Kanu’s health status has revealed that he is fit to continue facing the trial.

== Prison release and disappearance ==
On 20 October 2015, Vanguard announced that Kanu had been released on bail. However, media sources supporting the objectives of IPOB called the bail "controversial" and claimed the DSS announced the bail only "to calm the angry people of Biafra". Kanu has finally been released on bail by Justice Binta Nyako for health reasons.

Kanu disappeared from public view after his home was raided by the Nigerian military, in September 2017, an event which led to the deaths of 28 IPOB members. Not being seen in public for over a year, there was wide-ranging speculation regarding his whereabouts, with members of the IPOB accusing the Buhari government of having abducted him. However, in October 2018, unattributed photographs and videos, apparently placing him in Israel, were widely circulated on social media, and this was later confirmed by mainstream media.

Despite him resurfacing, his exact location and living place continued to remain unclear over the next years.

== Continued activism ==
In an interview in June 2017, Kanu demanded bullets and guns from a group of US-based Nigerians for self-defense against the incessant attacks on Igbos by the Fulani herdsmen which were currently reoccurring in Biafra lands.

Kanu's pronounced strategy has been the application of civil disobedience in pressing home his demand for the freedom of his people. In various air broadcasts, Nnamdi Kanu stated how his adoption of Martin Luther King Jr. and Mahatma Gandhi's forms of civil disobedience will lead to the "restoration of Biafra". In an interview granted to Newsweek, Nnamdi Kanu opined his belief in the teachings of Martin Luther King Jr. and Mahatma Gandhi, "I hope that what we are looking for can be accomplished peacefully. I am an advocate of passive resistance. Gandhi and Martin Luther King tried it to very good effects, so why should it not work in our case?"

Prior to the 2019 presidential election, IPOB had threatened to boycott the election. According to the leader of IPOB, Nnamdi Kanu, "It [the boycott] is a multi-faceted approach. It is civil disobedience, passive resistance, it is an expression of our resentment of Nigeria and what it represents". His position on election boycotts was widely criticised by local Nigerian politicians who argued to the contrary. On the eve of the election, Nnamdi Kanu lifted the boycott position and urged Biafrans to participate in the election after which he described as his condition as "signed, sealed and delivered". His shift was received in different quarters as being open to the appeal and opinions of others.

== Insurgency and second arrest ==
In December 2020, Kanu announced that IPOB had organized the Eastern Security Network (ESN) which was supposed to defend southeastern Nigerians from bandits and armed Fulani herders. Kanu later gave all the governors of southeast Nigeria 14 days to ban open-grazing, threatening to deploy the ESN to enforce a ban if the authorities did not do so.

The Nigerian government regarded the formation of a non-state-sanctioned paramilitary organization as unacceptable and moved to suppress the group. The situation escalated in January 2021 when the Nigerian military was repelled in an attempt to expel the ESN from Orlu, Imo. Before another offensive was launched, Kanu ordered the ESN to withdraw to the bush, temporarily ending the confrontation. The Nigerian army and air force renewed hostilities on 18 February by launching a military offensive against the ESN; the next day, IPOB declared that as of 18 February, a state of war had existed between Nigeria and Biafra. IPOB and other Biafran separatist groups consequently began to mobilize and fight the security forces across several southern Nigerian states. Despite this, Kanu maintained that IPOB was interested in a non-violent solution of the conflict and that ESN was supposed to fight bandits, not the Nigerian security forces. Regardless, Nigerian authorities designated IPOB as terrorist organization and claimed that Kanu was inciting violence.

On 27 June 2021, Kanu was allegedly arrested in Kenya or possibly another location by Interpol and extradited to Nigeria where he is supposed to face trial. However, Interpol in 2023 denied any involvement in the arrest. Kanu's brother claimed that he had been arrested by the Kenyan police. Kenyan High Commissioner Wilfred Machage refuted this claim, stating that Kenyan authorities had not been involved in the arrest and challenged anyone to present evidence proving otherwise. When the BBC attempted to request information from Interpol's office in Abuja, the latter did not answer the calls.

Kanu's arrest has sparked anger among Biafran separatists and other Nigerians supportive to his cause. The World Igbo Congress (WIC) declared the arrest "illegal abduction and international gangsterism". Following his arrest, questions had been raised over what was termed "Kanu's disregard of the Nigerian constitution" to abscond bail in 2017. On the occasion of his arraignment in court on 29 June 2021, Kanu told the presiding judge that the Nigerian military forced him to flee the country in 2017. The trial began in October 2021, with Kanu being accused of "terrorism, treason, involvement with a banned separatist movement, inciting public violence through radio broadcasts, and defamation of Nigerian authorities through broadcasts". He pleaded non-guilty in all cases. The proceedings were accompanied by protests and general strikes organized by his supporters.

On 19 January 2022, Justice Benson Anya of the Abia State High Court ruled that the 2017 arrest of Kanu was unlawful and an infringement on his human rights, and that his abduction and forceful return to Nigeria was "illegal" under local and international laws. Anya also ruled that the Nigerian government should pay Kanu a sum of N1billion as a compensation for the violation of his fundamental human rights. Despite this ruling, Kanu remained under arrest and the trial continued, as the other charges were still discussed and prosecutors added further charges. Ikemesit Effiong, researcher at a political risk analysis firm, argued that an ultimate conviction of Kanu remained likely, as the "political will exists to make an example of a separatist leader who has caused the central government more than its fair share of headaches".

In December 2023, Nigeria's Supreme Court reinstated terrorism charges against Kanu. As of 2024, his lead counsel is barrister Aloy Ejimakor. In mid-2024, a number of Nigerian politicians argued for Kanu's release. On 20 November 2025, Kanu was sentenced to life imprisonment by Justice James Omotosho of the Federal High Court of Nigeria, who found him guilty of terrorism and other charges.

=== Court Sentencing and Imprisonment ===
Nnamdi Kanu, the leader of the Indigenous People of Biafra (IPOB), was sentenced to life imprisonment on 20 November 2025 by a Nigerian court on multiple terrorism-related charges, including leading a proscribed group and inciting violence. Prosecutors had sought the death penalty against Kanu, but the Nigerian Justice who presided over the case, Justice Omotosho said he chose to show mercy.

== Violent comments ==
Mazi Nnamdi Kanu
(@MaziNnamdiKanu)
tweeted:

"I have not seen this kind of country; how do we live like ANIMALS" - Emir of Daura. Call a spade a spade. It’s not a country; it’s a #Zoo. But there’s an alternative: #Biafra

25 January 2021

Kanu's statements include:

  - In September 2015, in a heated address to the World Igbo Congress in Los Angeles, Kanu said, "we need guns and we need bullets" in reference to armed conflict.
  - In 2015, after Deeper Christian Life Ministry Superintendent William Kumuyi said Nigeria would remain united, Kanu threatened his life, saying "Pastor Kumuyi should be stoned and dealt with thoroughly if he comes to Aba for his planned crusade."
  - In 2017, a video of Kanu was released wherein he issued an open death threat to former Nigerian president Olusegun Obasanjo. He had told a gathering of supporters at his home that if any harm comes to him, members of IPOB should eliminate Obasanjo and his lineage. This was in reference to Obasanjo's statement at a gathering in Abuja that all must be done to stop IPOB.
  - Kanu said, "Nigeria should prepare for war, we are coming to annihilate you, my secret service are already studying the zoo and strategising" when referencing armed attacks by IPOB.
  - "If you find anybody in your village asking after Radio Biafra, kill the baboon Hausa, Fulani, or Yoruba bastard. Let them keep searching as we keep tweeting for #Biafra."
- Hate speech against other ethnic groups and Igbos that do not support him along with racist anti-Nigerian rhetoric:
  - "Niger Deltans are cowards; we know what to do to them. Akwa Ibom, Bayelsa, Delta, Rivers, Edo, and Cross Rivers states are our territory, and anybody who tries to oppose us will be crushed."
  - "Yoruba Pentecostalism is the reason why Fulanis are invading us today."
  - "Any army they [the Federal Government] send to Biafraland will die there. None will return alive. even if it require sacrificing my people I will do it"

== Recognition ==
Georgia (US state): Honorary citizen, 2026

== See also ==
- Simon Ekpa
