= Okpoko =

Town in Anambra State, Nigeria

- Human settlement
- Okpoko
- Interactive map of Okpoko

Population
  - Estimate: 128,000 as at 2,008

Okpoko
- Location in Nigeria
- Coordinates: 6°10′40″N 6°47′30″E
- Country: Nigeria
- State: Anambra State

Okpoko (listern) is a town in Anambra State, Nigeria. Okpoko is in Ogbaru local government area under the Anambra North senatorial district. It sits on the east bank of the Niger River just south of the larger city of Onitsha. As of 2007 Okpoko had an estimated population of 177,608.

== Flooding in Okpoko ==
During the rainy seasons flooding is one of the major events that leave the residents abandoning their homes, school and even government institutions.

Okpoko is known to be prone to flooding.

== Environmental Changes/ Improvements ==
Okpoko which was formally known as the largest slum in Africa, attracted a visit by the governor Chukwuma Soludo and his deputy who showed soar displeasure of the state of the town.

Heavy work has been put in place starting from eradicating the decadence in the town to the construction of new roads giving the town a new and more attractive environment.
