= Movement for the Actualization of the Sovereign State of Biafra =

Nigerian political party

- Flag of Biafra
- Abbreviation: MASSOB
- Leader: Ralph Uwazuruike
- Founded: 1999
- Ideology: Igbo nationalism Nonviolent resistance Separatism

Website
- http://biafranet.com/

The Movement for the Actualization of the Sovereign State of Biafra (MASSOB) is a secessionist movement in Nigeria, associated with Igbo nationalism, which supports the recreation of an independent state of Biafra. It was founded in 1999 and is led by an Indian-trained lawyer Ralph Uwazuruike, with headquarters in Okwe, in the Okigwe district of Imo State.

MASSOB's leaders say it is a peaceful group and advertise a 25-stage plan to achieve its goal peacefully. There are two arms to the government, the Biafra Government in Exile and Biafra Shadow Government.

The Nigerian government accuses MASSOB of violence; MASSOB's leader, Ralph Uwazuruike, was arrested in 2005 and detained on treason charges; he was released in 2007. MASSOB also championed the release of oil militant Mujahid Dokubo-Asari, who faced similar charges at the time. In 2009, MASSOB launched "the Biafran International Passport" in response to persistent demand by Biafrans in the diaspora.

== Ideology ==
MASSOB agitates for a Republic of Biafra comprising the South-East and South-South regions of Nigeria; though Uwazuruike has stated in interviews that the Niger Deltans "can have their own republic." The group's philosophy is hinged on the principle of non-violence as propagated by Mahatma Gandhi.

== Activities ==
=== Hoisting of Biafran flags ===
At its inception, MASSOB concentrated on organizing rallies and peaceful protests which culminated in hoisting Biafran flags at different locations in the South East. In recent years, this practice has been reserved mainly for celebrating key dates and events or in commemoration of dead members.

=== Protests ===
MASSOB members stage demonstrations to protest arrests and killings of its members. In one of these protests, the house of the late Nigerian leader, Nnamdi Azikiwe, was torched. The then Secretary-General of Ohanaeze Ndigbo, Col. Joe Achuzie (rtd) exonerated MASSOB from blame and accused the security agents of "carelessness and irresponsibility."

=== Re-introduction of the Biafran currency ===
In 2005, MASSOB re-introduced the old Biafran currency into circulation. This sparked a lot of excitement at the time especially as one Biafran pound was said to exchange for two hundred and seventy naira at the border communities of Togo and the Republic of Benin. In his reaction, the then President of Nigeria, Olusegun Obasanjo, likened the Biafran pounds to a collector's item and attributed its high exchange value to its relative rarity.

=== Introduction of the Biafran passport ===
MASSOB launched the Biafran passport in 2009 as part of the program to celebrate its 10th anniversary. MASSOB leader, Ralph Uwazuruike, said the introduction of the Biafran passport was in response to persistent demands from Biafrans in diaspora.

== Nigerian government response ==
Since its inception, MASSOB has continually alleged mass arrests and killings of its members by government forces. The group's sanitation grassroot information spokesperson has alleged that the government forces carries out secret executions of MASSOB members in detention centres and prisons nationwide. In May 2008, the group released a list of 2,020 members alleged to have been killed by security agents since 1999. MASSOB leader, Ralph Uwazuruike, has been arrested on several occasions and charged with treason. In 2011, Uwazuruike and 280 MASSOB members were arrested in Enugu while attending a function in honour of Ojukwu. Few days later, President Goodluck Jonathan ordered Uwazuruike's release as well as all other MASSOB members in detention.

In June 2012, the Human Rights Writers' Association of Nigeria condemned the alleged killing of 16 members of MASSOB by security agencies in Anambra.

In February 2013, MASSOB claimed that several corpses found floating in the Ezu River on the boundary of Enugu and Anambra States were those of its members previously arrested by the police. The group claimed that the police routinely executed MASSOB members without proper trial.

On 13 September 2015, police in Anambra state arrested no fewer than 25 MASSOB members who were marking their 16th anniversary; one MASSOB member was shot. At St Charles Lwanga Catholic Church Okpoko, 18 members were arrested and one shot and at Iba Pope Catholic Church, while at Awada, 11 members of MASSOB were arrested. At Awka, two MASSOB were arrested by the police according to the MASSOB former Deputy Director of Information, Mazi Chris Mocha.

On 31 May 2013, President Goodluck Jonathan, a Niger Deltan Ijaw from Bayelsa State and from the South South geopolitical zone, branded MASSOB to be one of three extremist groups threatening the security of Nigeria. Jonathan declared that "the Nigerian state faces three fundamental security challenges posed by extremist groups like Boko Haram in the North; the Movement for the Actualisation of the Sovereign State of Biafra in the South-East; and the Oodua People's Congress in the South-West."

== See also ==
- Biafra
- Igbo people
- Movement for the Emancipation of the Niger Delta
- Niger Delta People's Volunteer Force
- Nigerian Civil War
- Oodua Republic Front
- Indigenous People of Biafra
- Biafra liberation army
