= 2024 in Nigeria =

- Decades: 2000s; 2010s; 2020s
- See also: Other events of 2024; Timeline of Nigerian history

Events in the year 2024 in Nigeria.

== Federal government ==
- President: Bola Tinubu (APC)
- Vice President: Kashim Shettima (APC)
- Senate President: Godswill Akpabio (APC)
- House Speaker: Tajudeen Abbas (APC)
- Chief Justice: Olukayode Ariwoola, Kudirat Kekere-Ekun from 22 August

== Events ==
=== January ===
- 7 January – Five people are killed more than 30 others are rescued after a boat capsizes along the Niger River in Anambra State.
- 8 January – A two-year BBC investigation accuses the Synagogue Church of All Nations founder T. B. Joshua of rape and torture.
- 9 January – At least 20 people are feared dead after an accident involving two passenger boats.
- 15 January:
  - Bandits attack soldiers at a military base in Nahuta, Katsina State.
  - Eight people are killed and 100 others are reported missing after a boat capsizes along the boundary of Niger and Kebbi States.
- 17 January – Two people are killed and 77 others injured during a blast caused by explosives stored for use in illegal mining operations at a dozen buildings in Ibadan.
- 24 January – At least 30 people are killed during an attack by armed men in the village of Kwahaslalek, Plateau State.

=== February ===
- February 11: Nigeria loses 2–1 against Ivory Coast in the 2023 Africa Cup of Nations final held in Abidjan.

=== March ===
- 7 March – Kuriga kidnapping: More than 200 pupils and a teacher are kidnapped in the town of Kuriga, Chikun Local Government Area, Kaduna State
- 22 March – 14 people are rescued from kidnappers by the Nigerian Army and local vigilante groups in Katsina State.
- 24 March – Kuriga kidnapping: The pupils kidnapped on March 7 from schools in Kuriga are freed.

=== April ===
- 18 April – A schoolgirl who was abducted during the Chibok kidnapping in 2014 is rescued by authorities along with her three children in Gwoza, Borno State.
- 19 April – Six soldiers are killed and two others are injured in an ambush during anti-bandit operations in Shiroro, Niger State.
- 24 April – A total of 118 inmates escape from a prison in Suleja after heavy rains destroy its perimeter fence.

=== May ===
- 10 May – Nine students are abducted by gunmen from the Confluence University of Science and Technology in Osara, Kogi State.
- 15 May – Eight people are killed in an attack on a mosque in Gadan, Kano State.
- 20 May – At least 40 people are killed in an attack on the village of Zurak in Wase, Plateau State.
- 21 May:
  - Authorities rescue 350 Boko Haram hostages in the Sambisa Forest in Borno State.
  - Seven students are killed after inhaling fumes from a generator overnight inside a music studio in Yenagoa, Bayelsa State.
- 24 May – Ten people are killed while 160 others are abducted in an attack by suspected Boko Haram militants on the village of Kuchi in Niger State.
- 29 May – Nigeria readopts Nigeria, We Hail Thee, which was the country's national anthem from 1960 to 1978, as its national anthem, replacing Arise, O Compatriots.
- 30 May – 2024 Aba killings: Eleven people, including five soldiers, are killed in an attack on a military checkpoint by unknown gunmen in Aba, Abia State.

=== June ===
- 3 June:
  - A strike by the Nigerian Labour Congress and the Trade Union Congress of Nigeria disrupts operations at Abuja and Lagos Airports and causes nationwide power outages.
  - Thirty miners are reported trapped after a gold mine collapses in Galadima Kogo, Niger State.
- 10 June: Nigerian bandit conflict: At least 50 people are killed and an unknown number are kidnapped, including women and children, after gunmen attack the village of Yargoje in Katsina State.
- 22 June: At least seven people are killed and 100 others are kidnapped after gunmen attack the village of Maidabino in Katsina State.
- 29 June – 2024 Borno State bombings: A series of bombings in Borno State kill 18 people and injure 30 others.

=== July ===
- 12 July – 2024 Saints Academy college collapse: At least 22 students are killed and 132 others injured after a school building collapses in Jos, Plateau State.
- 18 July – The Nigeria Labour Congress, the Trade Union Congress, and the Nigerian government agree on a new minimum wage of ₦70,000 (US$43) per month, ending prolonged negotiations amid high inflation and a weakening currency.
- 26 July–11 August – Nigeria at the 2024 Summer Olympics
- 28 July – A court in Niger State convicts 125 people on charges of membership and financing of Boko Haram following a two-day mass trial and sentences them to varying prison terms.
- 31 July – Sixteen people are killed and at least 24 others are injured in a bomb attack on a market in Kawori, Borno State.

=== August ===
- 1 August–ongoing – End Bad Governance protests: Eleven people are killed, and one journalist is arrested as nationwide protests occur amidst a cost-of-living crisis and rising costs, which Nigerians blame on President Bola Tinubu's new reforms. A curfew is declared in Kano, Jigawa, Yobe and Katsina States in response to the violence.
- 5 August – Seven Polish students and faculty of the University of Warsaw are arrested in Kano State on suspicion of displaying Russian flags during protests. They are released on 28 August.
- 6 August – Police detain tailors who made Russian flags that were used in anti-government protests in Kano State.
- 7 August – A boat sinks following an engine explosion in Bayelsa State, killing at least 20 people.
- 15 August – At least 20 students of the University of Maiduguri and the University of Jos are abducted by unidentified gunmen along the Otukpo road in Benue State. They are subsequently freed on 23 August.
- 21 August – At least 13 farmers are killed by unidentified gunmen in Niger State.
- 25 August – Two police officers are killed and three others are injured in an attack in Abuja. A police spokesperson says that the proscribed Islamic Movement of Nigeria was responsible for the attack.
- 26 August –
  - A one-week nationwide doctors' strike begins in protest over the abduction of one of their members, Ganiyat Popoola, who remains in captivity after being kidnapped in Kaduna in December 2023.
  - At least 49 people are killed and more than 40,000 people are displaced by flooding caused by heavy rains in Adamawa, Jigawa, and Taraba States.
- 27 August – The United States donates 10,000 doses of mpox vaccines to Nigeria, making it the first African country to receive them.
- 31 August – Chidimma Adetshina, who withdrew from the Miss Universe South Africa 2024 competition due to racist abuse, is crowned as Miss Universe Nigeria 2024, defeating 24 other contestants.

=== September ===
- 1 September – Tarmuwa massacre: At least 130 people are killed after a Boko Haram attack on Tarmuwa, Yobe State.
- 8 September – At least 52 people and 50 cattle are killed in an explosion caused by a collision between a fuel tanker and a truck in Agaie, Niger State.
- 9 September – The State Security department arrests Joe Ajaero, the leader of the Nigeria Labour Congress, at Abuja Airport, days after he criticised the Nigerian government for raising gas prices.
- 10 September – 2024 Alau Dam collapse: The Alau Dam collapses in Borno State following heavy rains, resulting in floods that inundate 15% of the state capital Maiduguri. and killing more than 80% of animals in the Sanda Kyarimi Park Zoo. At least 30 people are reported killed due to flooding in the area.
- 14 September –
  - Thirteen people abducted by an unidentified armed group are rescued by the Nigerian Army in Kaduna State.
  - A boat capsizes near Gummi, Zamfara State, killing at least 40 people.
- 15 September – Over 280 inmates are reported to have escaped from a prison in Maiduguri due to damage to prison walls caused by floods.
- 17 September – At least 25 children are killed when a bus carrying Muslims celebrating Mawlid collides with a truck in Lere, Kaduna State.
- 30 September – An overloaded boat carrying 300 passengers capsizes along the Niger River in Mokwa, Niger State, leaving at least 11 people dead and more than 100 others missing.

=== October ===
- 15 October – 2024 Majiya fuel tanker explosion: At least 170 people are killed and 100 others are injured after an overturned fuel truck explodes while residents were trying to collect its cargo in Majiya, Jigawa State.
- 16 October – The Senate begins a probe into allegations that personnel of the Department of State Services had taken over the National Assembly Complex in a move to impeach the President of the Senate, Godswill Akpabio.
- 23 October – President Tinubu implements a cabinet reshuffle that results in the dismissal of the ministers of education, tourism, women's affairs and youth development as well as the junior minister for housing.
- 24 October – A Sikorsky S-76 helicopter chartered by the Nigerian National Petroleum Corporation crashes into the Gulf of Guinea off the coast of Calabar, Cross River State. Five people are killed while the remaining three passengers are reported missing.
- 27 October – A partially-demolished building collapses in Sabon-Lugbe, Abuja, killing seven people.
- 30 October – "Scores" of civilians are killed in an airstrike by the Chadian military on a group of fishermen mistaken to be Boko Haram militants in Tilma island on the Nigerian side of Lake Chad.

=== November ===
- 17 November - Samuel N. died from complications of a prostate laser treatment. The doctor was careless but he is still in denial.
- 18 November – At least seven members of the Nigeria Security and Civil Defence Corps are reported missing following a Boko Haram attack on their convoy in Shiroro, Niger State that also leaves 50 attackers dead.
- 29 November – A boat capsizes in the Niger River along the boundary of Kogi and Niger States, killing at least 27 people and leaving 100 others missing.

=== December ===
- 5 December –
  - The Durbar festival in Kano is recognized by UNESCO as an Intangible cultural heritage.
  - Eighteen Nigerians win the prestigious Diana Award for their outstanding social work and contributions to their communities.
- 8 December – At least 43 people are abducted in an attack by unidentified gunmen on the village of Kafin Dawa, Zamfara State.
- 15 December – Two people are killed during clashes between rival factions of the United Methodist Church in Taraba State.
- 18 December – At least 35 people are killed in a stampede at a religious festival held at an Islamic high school in Ibadan.
- 21 December –
  - At least ten people are killed in a stampede at a charity distribution event held at a church in Maitama, Abuja.
  - Three people are killed in a stampede at a charity distribution event in Okija, Anambra State.
- 25 December – At least ten civilians are killed in an airstrike in Silame, Sokoto State. The military says it had accidentally hit the victims during an operation against Lakurawa militants.

== Art and entertainment ==
- List of Nigerian submissions for the Academy Award for Best International Feature Film

== Holidays ==
- 1 January - New Year's Day
- 29 March – Good Friday
- 1 April - Easter Monday
- 11 April – Eid al-Fitr
- 1 May - International Workers' Day
- 12 June - Democracy Day
- 17 June – Eid al-Adha
- 15 September – Milad un-Nabi
- 1 October – Independence Day
- 25 December – Christmas Day
- 26 December – Boxing Day

== Deaths ==
=== January ===
- 3 January – Sebastian Brodrick, 85, Olympic footballer (1960).
- 20 January – Anezi Okoro, 94, author (One Week One Trouble).

=== February ===
- 4 February – Bukar Ibrahim, 73, politician, senator (2007–2019) and governor of Yobe State (1992–1993, 1999–2007).
- 5 February – Jimi Solanke, 81, actor (Sango, Shadow Parties), poet, and playwright.
- 6 February – Joseph Chike Edozien, 98, traditional ruler, king of Asaba (since 1990).
- 7 February – Ethel Ekpe, 60, actress (Basi and Company).
- 9 February:
  - Abimbola Ogunbanjo, 61, businessman.
  - Herbert Wigwe, 57, banker.
- 10 February – Jones Arogbofa, 71, military officer, chief of staff to the president (2014–2015).
- 14 February – Folake Onayemi, 59, literary scholar.
- 28 February – Fabian Osuji, 82, politician, minister of education (2003–2005).

=== March ===
- 2 March – John Okafor, 62, actor (Issakaba) and comedian.
- 3 March – Eze V. B. C. Onyema III, 97, traditional ruler of Ogwu-Ikpele (since 1976).
- 10 March – Abubakar Sodangi, 70, politician, senator (1999–2011).
- 14 March – Lekan Balogun, 81, monarch.
- 24 March – Amaechi Muonagor, 61, actor (Karishika, Aki na Ukwa, Aki and Pawpaw).
- 26 March – Wole Oguntokun, 56, playwright.

=== April ===
- 2 April – Ali Chiroma, 91, trade unionist, president of the Nigeria Labour Congress (1984–1988).
- 7 April – Aderounmu Adejumoke, 40, actress (Dazzling Mirage, Industreet, Jenifa's Diary).
- 8 April – Bright Esieme, 31, footballer (Enyimba).
- 9 April – Saratu Gidado, 56, actress.
- 10 April – Junior Pope, 39, actor (Professor Johnbull).
- 11 April – Ogbonnaya Onu, 72, politician, minister of science (2015–2022) and governor of Abia State (1992–1993).
- 17 April – Rafiu Adebayo Ibrahim, 57, politician, senator (2015–2019) and member of the House of Representatives (2011–2015).
- 23 April – Zulu Adigwe, actor (Basi and Company, Issakaba, Living in Bondage: Breaking Free).
- 25 April – Ayogu Eze, 65, politician, senator (2007–2015).

=== May ===
- 5 May – Lizzy Evoeme, 81, actress (New Masquerade).
- 9 May – Ibrahim Babangida, 47, footballer (FC Volendam).
- 17 May:
  - Garba Duba, 82, army general and politician, governor of Sokoto State (1984–1985) and Bauchi State (1978–1979).
  - Tony Ekubia, 64, Nigerian-British boxer.
- 19 May – Bola Afonja, 81, politician, minister of labour (1993).
- 24 May – Ayo Banjo, 90, academic administrator, vice-chancellor of the University of Ibadan (1984–1991).
- 25 May – Ibrahim Lamorde, 61, police officer, chairman of the Economic and Financial Crimes Commission (2011–2015).

=== June ===
- 14 June – Tagwai Sambo, 87, traditional ruler, chief of Moroa (since 1966).
- 17 June – Jonah Ogunniyi Otunla, 69, financial accountant, Accountant-General of the Federation (2011–2015).
- 16 June – Ekene Abubakar Adams, 39, member of parliament.

=== July ===
- 30 July – Onyeka Onwenu, 72, singer-songwriter and actress (Half of a Yellow Sun, Lionheart).

=== November ===
- 5 November – Taoreed Lagbaja, 56, chief of army staff (since 2023).
