= 2026 in Nigeria =

- Decades: 2000s; 2010s; 2020s
- See also: Other events of 2026; Timeline of Nigerian history

Events in the year 2026 in Nigeria.

== Federal government ==
- President: Bola Tinubu (APC)
- Vice President: Kashim Shettima (APC)
- Senate President: Godswill Akpabio (APC)
- House Speaker: Tajudeen Abbas (APC)
- Chief Justice: Kudirat Kekere-Ekun

== Events ==
=== January ===
- 2 January –
  - A CASC Rainbow of the Nigerian Air Force crashes into a forest after a technical failure in Kontagora, Niger State.
  - Eleven Indian nationals of the merchant vessel MV Aruna Hulya are arrested by operatives of the National Drug Law Enforcement Agency (NDLEA), after 31.5 kilograms of cocaine is discovered concealed aboard the ship at Apapa Port, Lagos.
- 3 January –
  - A boat carrying 52 passengers capsizes along the Yobe River in Yobe State, killing 25 people and leaving 14 missing.
  - At least 50 people are killed in an attack by gunmen on the village of Kasuwan-Daji in Borgu, Niger State.
- 4 January – At least nine soldiers are killed and several others injured when their convoy hits a landmine and is ambushed near Bindundul, Borno State; the attack is attributed to Islamic State – West Africa Province (ISWAP) militants.
- 9 January – A bus crashes in Bauchi State, killing nine people and injuring 10 others.
- 12 January – Schools in northern Nigeria begin reopening after a months-long closure following the Papiri kidnapping in November 2025.
- 17 January – Nigeria finishes third at the 2025 Africa Cup of Nations in Morocco, defeating Egypt 4–2 on penalties at Stade Mohammed V in Casablanca.
- 18 January – Around 177 people are abducted by gunmen following attacks on three churches in Kurmin Wali in Kajuru, Kaduna State.
- 19 January –
  - Soldiers responding to an attack on a village in Zamfara State are ambushed by militants, resulting in the deaths of five soldiers and one police officer.
  - Boko Haram insurgents attack a military formation in Borno State’s Timbuktu Triangle, killing at least eight soldiers and wounding around 50.
- 20 January – A bus collides with a truck on the A232 in Edo State, killing 11 people and injuring seven.
- 21 January – Soldiers rescue 62 hostages and kill two militants during separate military operations in Zamfara and Kebbi States.
- 26 January – The army rescues 11 kidnapping victims who had been held for 92 days after being abducted from Gada Mallam Maman, Kaduna State in October 2025.
- 27 January – Boko Haram militants kill seven Nigerian soldiers and capture 13 others in a gun battle during a patrol in Damasak, Borno State.
- 29 January –
  - ISWAP carries out a drone attack the Nigerian army's Sabon Gari base in Borno State, killing at least 11 security personnel.
  - At least 25 construction workers are killed in a Boko Haram attack on Sabon Gari, Borno State.
- 31 January –
  - The Nigerian Army carries out a raid in Kodunga, Borno State, that kills 11 Boko Haram militants, including senior commander Abu Khalid.
  - Fela Kuti is posthumously granted a Lifetime Achievement Award at the Grammys for his contributions to Afrobeat, making him the first African to receive the award.

=== February ===
- 2 February – Federal prosecutors file 57 terrorism-related charges at the Federal High Court in Abuja against nine men accused of carrying out the June 2025 Yelwata massacre of 150 people.
- 3 February – At least 13 people are killed in an attack by gunmen on the village of Doma in Faskari, Katsina State.
- 4 February – At least 162 people are killed in an attack by gunmen on the villages of Nuku and Woro in Kwara State.
- 6–22 February – Nigeria at the 2026 Winter Olympics
- 6 February – A High Court in Enugu State orders the United Kingdom to pay £420 million compensation to the families of 21 coal miners killed by colonial police during a strike at the Iva Valley coal mine in 1949; the UK government says it had not been formally notified of the judgment, and was not represented in the proceedings.
- 7 February – Gunmen attack a Catholic priest's residence in Kauru, Kaduna State, killing three people and abducting a priest among several others.
- 8 February – A truck carrying passengers crashes in Kwanar Barde in Gezawa, Kano State, killing 30 people.
- 14 February – At least 46 people are killed in attacks by gunmen on the villages of Tunga-Makeri, Konkoso and Pissa in Borgu, Niger State.
- 16 February –
  - The United States sends 100 soldiers to provide training, technical and intelligence support to Nigerian forces combating Islamic militants and other armed groups.
  - Eight soldiers are killed in an attack by ISWAP militants on a military camp in Cross Kauwa, Borno State.
- 18 February – Thirty-eight people are killed in a gas explosion at the Kampanin Zurak lead mining site in Bashar, Plateau State.
- 19 February –
  - Lakurawa militants kill 34 people in multiple coordinated attacks on villages in Kebbi State.
  - At least 50 people are killed in an attack by gunmen on the village of Tungan Dutse in Bukkuyum, Zamfara State.
  - Islamic police in Kano State arrest nine Muslims for allegedly eating in public during the first day of Ramadan fasting.
- 23 February – A fire breaks out at Murtala Muhammed International Airport in Lagos, injuring six people and causing a temporary closure of airspace over the city.
- 25 February – At least 25 people are killed when gunmen attack the villages of Kirchinga and Garaha in Adamawa State.
- 28 February – At least 15 people are killed in an attack by gunmen on three villages in Borgu, Niger State.

=== March ===
- 4 March – ISWAP militants attack multiple Nigerian Army bases in Borno State, killing at least 14 soldiers and abducting at least one woman.
- 6 March –
  - Around 300 people are abducted by Islamist militants in Ngoshe, Borno State.
  - At least 45 militants are killed in clashes between the Nigerian Armed Forces and armed bandits in Dan Musa, Katsina State.
- 9 March – Boko Haram and ISWAP-linked militants conduct multiple overnight attacks on military positions and communities in Borno State and Yobe State, killing at least 12 soldiers and three civilians and temporarily seizing a military base.
- 13 March – Around 20 members of the security forces are killed in an ambush in Kanam, Plateau State.
- 16 March – 2026 Maiduguri bombings: At least 23 people are killed in bombings at three locations in Maiduguri.
- 17 March – At least 18 people are killed in attacks on two villages in Jibia, Katsina State.
- 18 March – Over 80 Boko Haram and Islamic State – West Africa Province insurgents are killed in an operation by the Nigerian Army in Abadam, Borno State.
- 19 March – A migration and security deal is agreed with the United Kingdom during a state visit by President Tinubu, including a £746 million project to refurbish major ports in Lagos.
- 20 March – 2026 Kwara State attacks: Government forces arrest three men suspected of participating in the February attacks and mass abductions in two villages in Kaiama, Kwara State.
- 21 March – Two people are killed in an explosion after a tipper truck and a tank truck collide outside a gas station on the Lekki–Epe Expressway in Ajah, Lagos State.
- 23 March – A tanker crashes on the Tafa-Gujeni road in Niger State, killing 10 passengers and injuring 20 others.
- 29 March – Thirty people are killed in an attack by gunmen on a community in Jos North, Plateau State.

=== April ===
- 5 April – The Nigerian Army rescues 31 civilians taken hostage during an attack on Easter church services in Kaduna State; at least five people are confirmed dead.
- 11 April –
  - The Attorney General convicts 386 Islamist militants in multiple mass trials held in Abuja, following proceedings at the Federal High Court involving over 500 cases linked to Boko Haram and ISWAP insurgency suspects.
  - More than 100 people are killed in an airstrike on a market in Yobe State blamed by authorities on a misfire.
- 13 April – Seven soldiers are killed as Islamist militants from Boko Haram and ISWAP attack a Nigerian Army base at the 242 Battalion barracks in Borno State; at least 12 militants are killed in the ensuing gunfight.
- 16 April – Gunmen abduct several passengers from a bus along the Otukpo-Makurdi highway in Benue State.
- 22 April –
  - Twenty people are killed in Boko Haram attacks on the villages of Pubagu, Borno State and Mayo-Ladde in Adamawa State.
  - A truck carrying passengers and goods crashes in Ewu, Edo State, killing 12 people and injuring 14.
- 26 April –
  - At least 29 people are killed in an attack by gunmen on the Guyaku community in Gombi, Adamawa State; the attack is later claimed by Islamic State.
- 27 April – Twenty-three pupils are abducted by gunmen from an illegal orphanage in Lokoja, Kogi State.
- 29 April – At least 18 Islamist militants are killed during multiple coordinated operations by military forces targeting insurgent enclaves in Borno State.
- 30 April – Forty-one Fulani herders are killed in attacks by a pro-government militia and Beninese vigilantes in Borgu, Niger State.

=== May ===
- 1 May – China lifts tariffs on imports from Nigeria until 2028.
- 6 May – Eighteen loggers are killed in an attack by Boko Haram militants in Bama, Borno State.
- 7 May – The army rescues nine people abducted from an orphanage in Kogi State in April.
- 8 May – Two soldiers are killed while several others are injured in an attack by ISWAP militants on a Nigerian army forward operating base in Magumeri, Borno State.
- 10 May –
  - At least 72 civilians are killed in an airstrike during operations against bandits in Tumfa, Zamfara State.
  - At least 13 civilians are killed in an airstrike during operations against bandits in Niger State.
  - At least 30 travelers are killed in an attack by armed gangs in Zamfara State.
- 13 May – Former power minister Saleh Mamman is sentenced to 75 years' imprisonment by the Federal High Court of Nigeria on 12 counts of laundering 33.8 billion naira ($24.6 million) from hydro-electricity projects. He is arrested in Kaduna State on 19 May.
- 15 May –
  - At least 42 children are reported missing after Islamist militants attack a primary and junior secondary school in Askira/Uba, Borno State, abducting pupils during classes and from nearby homes.
  - Oyo school kidnappings: Three people are arrested following a kidnapping incident on two primary schools in Oriire, Oyo State.
- 16 May –
  - US President Donald Trump and Nigerian President Bola Tinubu announce that American and Nigerian forces killed Abu-Bilal al-Minuki, the ISIS second in command globally and his several lieutenants in a strike on his compound in the Lake Chad Basin.
  - At least 17 police trainees are killed after Islamist militants attack the Nigerian Army Special Forces School in Buni Yadi, Yobe State.
- 21 May – Authorities carry out the country’s largest-ever methamphetamine seizure, confiscating 2.4 tons of methamphetamine and precursor chemicals worth an estimated US$363 million during raids on an industrial-scale clandestine laboratory in Ogun State. Ten of the suspects are charged by the anti-drug agency in July.
- 24 May – The army announces the rescue of 92 people abducted by jihadist groups in Biu, Borno State.

=== June ===
- 3 June –
  - A federal court sentences four suspected members of al-Shabaab to death on charges related to the Owo church attack in 2022.
  - Seven students are abducted by gunmen from an off-campus residence in Kaura Namoda, Zamfara State.
  - Three soldiers are killed in a jihadist attack on an army base in Gajiganna, Borno State.
- 5 June – Five soldiers are killed in a jihadist attack on an army base in Biu, Borno State.
- 7 June –
  - The army rescues 360 hostages from a hideout in the Mandara Mountains of Borno State, during an intelligence-led operation against the Boko Haram faction of Jama'atu Ahlis Sunna Lidda'awati wal-Jihad.
  - Thirty-nine people are abducted by bandits during community negotiations with the perpetrators in Maradun, Zamfara State.
- 8 June – A passenger train derails on the Itakpe-Warri route in Delta State, killing four people and injuring 24 others.
- 9 June – At least 74 people are reported to have died following an outbreak of cholera in Borno State that began in May.
- 12 June – At least 17 people are killed in an attack by gunmen on the town of Goron Namaye in Maradun, Zamfara State.
- 15 June – The Federal High Court officially orders the Independent National Electoral Commission (INEC) to deregister the African Democratic Congress (ADC) and four other political parties for failing to meet constitutional electoral performance requirements.
- 21 June – At least 20 people are killed in an attack by gunmen on the settlement of Kawel in Bokkos, Plateau State.
- 20 June – 2026 Ekiti State gubernatorial election
- 23 June – At least nine people are killed and 27 are injured after a multi-storey building collapses in Lagos.
- 30 June – At least 18 people are killed in communal clashes between the Fulani and Kamuku communities in Tegina, Niger State.

=== July ===
- 3 July – Following the recent operation against ISWAP militants in Nigeria, the United States withdraws most of its deployed forces while continuing to provide intelligence support to Nigeria at the request of its government.
- 5 July – A truck and a bus collide in Ogun State, killing 10 people and injuring six others.
- 8 July – The Nigerian Army and vigilantes begin a two-day operation against armed bandit groups in Gummi, Zamfara State, with more than 300 bandits killed during the fighting.
- 13 July – At least eight people are killed after gunmen attack the Otukpo-Nobi community in Otukpo, Benue State.
- 15 July –
  - The government launches a US$500 million agriculture investment fund for the Niger Delta to boost food production, attract private investment, and strengthen food security.
  - Adeniyi Matthew, the head of the fictitious Presidential Foreign Investment Promotion Council, is arrested in Osun State following a court-issued warrant over charges of forgery and impersonation in connection with the creation and operation of the fake government agency.
- 16 July – The Ministry of Foreign Affairs announces the completion of the voluntary evacuation of 1,490 citizens from South Africa following apparent xenophobic attacks.
- 22 July – At least 24 farmers are killed and several others wounded when armed bandits attack a farming community in Talata Mafara, Zamfara State.
- 24 July – The United States imposes a 12.5% tariff on Nigeria, citing the presence of alleged forced labour in the supply chain.
- 27 July – At least 30 people are killed and four others injured, after armed gunmen attack Naridon village in Kauru, Kaduna State.
- 28 July – At least 14 people are killed after gunmen attack Efeyi village in Otukpo, Benue State.

=== August ===
- 2 August – At least 12 people are killed after armed bandits attack Lajinge village in Sokoto State.
- 10 August – At least 29 people are killed in clashes between police and rebels in Sakaba, Kebbi State.
- 12 August – More than 50 Muslim and Christian leaders sign an interfaith peace accord in Abuja, in order to establish a new body promoting religious harmony and cooperation across the nation.
- 15 August – 2026 Osun State gubernatorial election
- 22 August – Several people are killed and abducted by Lakurawa militants in Dikera and Binzi villages in Niger State. Some are able to escape during the group's clashes with Mahmuda militants.

=== September ===
- 3 September –
  - Uber announces the immediate closure of its operations in Nigeria after 12 years of service in the country.
  - At least 37 people are killed by toxic fumes whilst stealing petrol from a pipeline in Okrika, Rivers State.
- 9 September – Major General Ibikunle Ajose is appointed as the new commander of Operation Hadin Kai, replacing Major General Abdulsalam Abubakar as the officer responsible for leading military operations against Boko Haram and ISWAP.
- 11 September – The National Assembly suspends official visits to South Africa and orders lawmakers to boycott South African-hosted legislative activities, citing alleged xenophobic attacks on Nigerians and other African migrants.
- 18 September –
  - An overnight curfew is imposed in Minna, Niger State, following protests over the deaths of 37 detainees in Nigeria Security and Civil Defence Corps custody.
  - At least 49 people die and 182 are hospitalised in Ondo State, following a suspected methanol poisoning outbreak from locally produced alcohol.

=== October ===
- 2 October – At least 20 people are killed in a multi-vehicle crash along the Hawan Kibo-Jos route in Plateau State.
- 5 October – An ATR-42 aircraft of the Nigerian Air Force crashes into a swamp near a naval base in Ondo State, killing all 25 people on board.
- 10 October –
  - More than 40 ISWAP fighters are killed by the military following an airstrike on an enclave in Borno State.
  - At least 20 people are killed as gunmen ambush a military-escorted convoy of traders travelling from Gwashi to Nasarawa market in Zamfara State.
- 17 October – At least 15 people are killed in an ambush by Boko Haram insurgents on a convoy in Borno State.
- 20 October – A case of Ebola is detected in a patient in Abuja who had travelled to Uganda.
- 23 October – At least 40 people are killed by gunmen in an attack on Binnari, Taraba State.
- 26 October – Cleric Yahaya Ibrahim Masussuka, known for his controversial views on Islam, is shot dead in motorcycled assailants in Dutsin-Ma, Katsina State.
- 30 October – Army troops kill 48 Boko Haram and ISWAP fighters, after repelling overnight attacks on military positions in Borno and Yobe states.

=== November ===
- 8 November – Eleven people are killed and thirteen abducted, after gunmen attack a village in Maradun district, Zamfara State.
- 11 November – Four students of the University of Nigeria die in disputed circumstances following an after-exam party in Nsukka.
- 20 November – At least four people are killed when an overcrowded boat traveling to a funeral suffers structural failure and capsizes in Bayelsa State.

== Holidays ==
- 1 January – New Year's Day
- 20–21 March – Eid al-Fitr
- 4 April – Good Friday
- 6 April – Easter Sunday
- 7 April – Easter Monday
- 1 May – International Workers' Day
- 27 – 28 May – Eid al-kabir
- 12 June – Democracy Day
- 14 August – Milad un-Nabi
- 1 October – Independence Day
- 25 December – Christmas Day
- 26 December – Boxing Day

== Art and entertainment ==
- List of Nigerian submissions for the Academy Award for Best International Feature Film

== Deaths ==
- 12 January – Oba C. D. Akran, 89, politician and traditional ruler.
- 19 February – Barry Mpigi, 64, member of the House of Representatives (2011–2019) and senator (since 2019).
- 10 April – Peter Nworie Chukwu, 60, Roman Catholic prelate, bishop of Abakaliki (since 2021).
- 12 May – Alexx Ekubo, 40, actor (Weekend Getaway, Lagos Cougars, The Bling Lagosians).
- 15 May – Abu-Bilal al-Minuki, second-in-command of the global Islamic State network.
- 25 May – Victor Udoh, 21, footballer (Royal Antwerp).
- 27 May – Chikadibia Isaac Obiakor, 75, army general and United Nations force commander.
- 8 June – Divine Adili, 21, born basketball player (Ateneo Blue Eagles)
- 13 June – Rabe Abubakar, 61, Army major general and military spokesman.
- 9 July – Augustine Obiora Akubeze, 69, Roman Catholic prelate and archbishop of Benin City (since 2011).
- 30 August – Taiwo Hassan, 66, actor (Aníkúlápó).
- 3 September – Ahmad Muhammad Sani II, 84, traditional ruler, emir of Gumel (since 1980).
- 5 September – Albert Alós, 86, academic
- 12 September – Bamanga Tukur, 90, governor of Gongola State (1983)
- 16 September – Olu Jacobs, 84, actor (Ashanti, Baby: Secret of the Lost Legend, Pirates)
- 20 September – Ibrahim Idris, 77, governor of Kogi State (2003–2012)
- 19 October – Emmanuel Uduaghan, 71, governor of Delta State (2007–2015).
- 26 October – Yahaya Ibrahim Masussuka, Islamic cleric.
- 4 November – Edward Anyamkyegh, 48, footballer (Sheriff Tiraspol, Karpaty Lviv, Atlantis).
