= 2025 in Nigeria =

- Decades: 2000s; 2010s; 2020s
- See also: Other events of 2025; Timeline of Nigerian history

Events in the year 2025 in Nigeria.

== Federal government ==
- President: Bola Tinubu (APC)
- Vice President: Kashim Shettima (APC)
- Senate President: Godswill Akpabio (APC)
- House Speaker: Tajudeen Abbas (APC)
- Chief Justice: Kudirat Kekere-Ekun

== Events ==
=== January ===
- 5 January – Six soldiers and 34 militants are killed during an ambush by Boko Haram in Damboa, Borno State.
- 7 January – Two people are killed in a bomb attack on a school in Bwari, Abuja.
- 11 January – At least 21 members of the Katsina Community Watch Corps are killed in an ambush by bandits in Baure, Katsina State.
- 13 January – At least 40 farmers are killed in an attack by suspected Boko Haram militants in Dumba, Borno State.
- 13 January – At least 16 civilians are killed in an airstrike in Zamfara State. The military says it had accidentally hit the victims during an operation against militants.
- 18 January –
  - Nigeria is admitted to BRICS as a "partner country".
  - 2025 Suleja fuel tanker explosion: At least 98 people are killed after a crashed fuel truck explodes near Suleja, Niger State.
- 22 January – At least 20 people are killed in a Boko Haram attack on the village of Gadan Gari, Borno State.
- 23 January – The government officially designates the militant group Lakurawa as a terrorist organisation.
- 24 January – A flight operated by United Airlines from Lagos to Washington DC returns to make an emergency landing at Murtala Muhammed International Airport following a “technical issue and an unexpected aircraft movement”, injuring 38 people on board.
- 25 January – A fuel tanker crashes into 17 vehicles along the Enugu-Onitsha expressway in Enugu State and explodes, killing at least 18 people.
- 26 January – Malam-Fatori suicide bombing: At least 27 soldiers are killed in a suicide bombing by Islamic State – West Africa Province militants on a garrison in Malam-Fatori, Borno State.

=== February ===
- 2 February – Two buses collide on the Benin–Ore–Sagamu Expressway in Odigbo, Ondo State before catching fire, killing 30 people and injuring two others.
- 5 February – At least 17 children are killed in a fire at an Islamic school in Kaura Namoda, Zamfara State.
- 13 February – A truck falls into an overpass in Kano, killing 23 and injuring 48.
- 16 February – At least ten civilians are reported killed in an airstrike in Safana, Katsina State. The military says it had accidentally hit the victims during an operation against rebels.
- 19 February – The Netherlands agrees to repatriate 119 artefacts from the National Museum of Ethnology in Leiden, including some of the Benin Bronzes, to Nigeria. They are officially turned over in a ceremony in Edo State on 19 June.
- 22 February – A bus crashes into a petrol tanker near Kusobogi, Niger State, killing 14 people and injuring six others.

=== March ===
- 7 March –
  - The Senate of Nigeria suspends Senator Natasha Akpoti for six months after she accuses Senate President Godswill Akpabio of sexually harassing her in 2023. The suspension is ordered lifted by a court in Abuja on 4 July.
  - Catholic priest Sylvester Okechukwu is abducted and killed in Kaduna.
- 9 March – Eleven people are killed in attacks by Lakurawa militants on the Birnin Dede area of Kebbi State.
- 10 March – The Nigerian government signs a $200 million deal with WeLight to deploy renewable mini-grids in rural areas.
- 11 March –
  - State authorities confirm an outbreak of meningitis in Kebbi State that has killed at least 26 people since January.
  - Nigeria reports 535 Lassa fever cases and 98 deaths across 14 states, with a fatality rate of 18.3%, prompting renewed health advisories and contact tracing efforts.
- 18 March – President Tinubu, invoking an emergency, imposes a six-month suspension on Rivers State governor Siminalayi Fubara and members of the Rivers State House of Assembly, citing inaction regarding attacks on oil pipelines. Former navy commander Ibokette Ibas is appointed as caretaker governor.
- 19 March – A truck crashes into 14 stationary vehicles near Abuja and catches fire, killing six people.
- 25 March – Twenty Cameroonian soldiers stationed on the Nigerian border town of Wulgo are killed in a raid by Boko Haram militants.
- 28 March –
  - Sixteen people accused of being kidnappers are killed by a mob in Uromi, Edo State.
  - Six people are killed during clashes between police and the Islamic Movement of Nigeria during one of the latter's demonstrations in Abuja.

=== April ===
- 2 April –
  - President Tinubu dismisses the entire board of the Nigerian National Petroleum Company.
  - At least 48 people are killed in attacks on villages in Plateau State blamed on intercommunal clashes.
- 11 April – Gwaska Dankarami, a militant commander linked to Islamic State, is reported killed along with 100 other militants during a military operation in the Munumu Forest of Katsina State.
- 12 April – Eight people are killed in a roadside bombing targeting a bus along the Damboa-Maiduguri highway in Borno State.
- 13 April – At least 40 people are killed in an attack by suspected herders on Zike, Plateau State.
- 18 April – At least 56 people are killed in an attack by suspected herders in Benue State.
- 24 April – At least 20 people are killed in an attack by gunmen on the village of Gobirawa Chali in Zamfara State.
- 28 April – At least 26 people are killed after a truck hits a roadside bomb in Borno State.
- 29 April – Peter Nwachukwu, the husband of gospel singer Osinachi Nwachukwu, is sentenced to death by hanging in connection with her death in 2022.
- 30 April – Nigeria completes payment of a $3.4 billion emergency loan from the International Monetary Fund to finance its response to the COVID-19 pandemic in 2020.

=== May ===
- 8 May – At least 30 people are killed in an attack by suspected Indigenous People of Biafra militants on motorists travelling along the Okigwe-Owerri road in Imo State.
- 15 May – At least 57 people are killed in an attack by Boko Haram militants on two villages in Baga, Borno State.
- 18 May – My Father's Shadow, directed by Akinola Davies Jr. and co-written by his brother Wale, becomes the first Nigerian film to be screened at the Cannes Film Festival.
- 25 May – Twenty people are killed in an attack by gunmen on the village of Aondona in Gwer West, Benue State.
- 26 May – A suicide bomber detonates himself in front of the Abacha Barracks in Abuja, injuring another person.
- 29 May – 2025 Mokwa flood: At least 200 people are reported killed in flooding caused by heavy rains in Mokwa, Niger State.
- 30 May – At least 25 people are reported killed following flooding and landslides in Okrika, Rivers State.
- 31 May –
  - A bus carrying athletes from the Nigerian National Sports Festival in Ogun State falls off the Chiromawa Bridge along the Kano-Zaria expressway in Kano State, killing at least 22 people.
  - At least 20 vigilantes are killed in an airstrike conducted during operations against bandits in Maru, Zamfara State.

=== June ===
- 1 June –
  - At least 45 people are killed in attacks by gunmen on two villages in Benue State.
  - A Catholic priest is abducted along with several other travelers by Boko Haram following an ambush at a military checkpoint near Gwoza, Borno State that leaves one person dead.
- 12 June – President Tinubu grants a posthumous pardon to activist Ken Saro-Wiwa and other members of the Ogoni Nine who were executed by the military regime in 1995.
- 13 June – Over 100 people people are killed in an attack by gunmen on the village of Yelewata in Guma, Benue State.
- 20 June –
  - A female suicide bomber detonates inside a restaurant in Konduga, Borno State, killing 12 people.
  - At least 12 people are killed in a mob attack on a bus in Mangu, Plateau State.
- 24 June – Seventeen soldiers are killed during clashes with gunmen in Mariga, Niger State.
- 26 June – President Tinubu signs into law fiscal measures including a reduction in corporate tax to 25% from 30% and the exemption of low-revenue small businesses from company tax.

=== July ===
- 2 July – The African Democratic Congress is formed by Atiku Abubakar and Peter Obi to oppose President Tinubu and the All Progressives Congress in the 2027 Nigerian general election.
- 6 July –
  - Nine people are reported killed in an attack by Boko Haram militants on Malam Fatori, Borno State.
  - A truck and a commercial vehicle carrying passengers collide along the Zaria-Kano expressway in Kano State, killing 21 people and injuring three others.
- 7 July – Nigerian bandit conflict: Over 70 vigilante group members are killed and others are reported missing in an ambush by bandits in Plateau State.
- 10 July – Nigerian bandit conflict: Around 30 gunmen are killed following clashes with security forces in Katsina State.
- 12 July – Special courts in Kanji, Niger State, sentence 44 people to up to 30 years' imprisonment for providing financial aid to Boko Haram.
- 15 July – Nigerian bandit conflict: Around 20 people are killed in an attack by gunmen on the village of Tahoss in Riyom, Plateau State.
- 18 July – Nigerian bandit conflict: Nine people are killed while at least 15 others are abducted in an attack by gunmen in Talata Mafara, Zamfara State.
- 22 July –
  - The Senate approves a request by President Tinubu to borrow $21 billion from external sources to support the 2025 fiscal budget.
  - Nigerian bandit conflict: Around 95 gunmen and one soldier are killed following clashes with security forces in Rijau, Niger State.
- 24 July – Gunmen ambush a vehicle returning from the weekly market in Bokkos, Plateau State, killing 14 people.
- 26 July –
  - Nigeria wins its 10th Women's Africa Cup of Nations title after defeating Morocco 3-2 at the 2024 Women's Africa Cup of Nations final in Rabat.
  - A boat carrying marketgoers capsizes in Shiroro, Niger State, killing 25 passengers.
  - Nigerian bandit conflict: Around 38 people abducted by bandits from the village of Banga in Zamfara State in March are reported killed despite having paid ransom money, while 18 other captives are released.
- 27 July – At least 25 people are killed while 11 others are reported missing following flash floods in Adamawa State.
- 29 July – A seven-day strike is launched by healthcare workers nationwide in protest over inadequate allowances, inadequate medical equipment and unsafe working conditions.
- 31 July – More than 1,600 parrots and canaries that were being smuggled to Kuwait are seized by the Nigeria Customs Service at Murtala Muhammed International Airport in Lagos.

=== August ===
- 4 August – Armed bandits raid five villages near Sabongarin Damri in Zamfara State, abducting at least 45 women and children and killing some villagers during an overnight assault.
- 8 August – Nigerian authorities arrest Dai Qisheng, a fugitive Chinese gang leader who fled China in 2024, and extradite him to China on 15 August under a joint Interpol operation.
- 12 August – The Nigerian military conducts raids in Zamfara State, killing an unknown number of armed bandits and several gang leaders following intelligence showing over 400 gang members preparing to attack a village.
- 16 August – Authorities announce the arrest of the leaders of the militant groups Ansaru and Mahmuda.
- 18 August – A boat carrying 50 passengers capsizes in Goronyo, Sokoto State, leaving 25 people missing.
- 19 August – At least 50 people are killed in an attack by gunmen on a mosque and villages in the Unguwan Mantau area of Katsina State.
- 23 August –
  - At least 76 people are rescued from gunmen following airstrikes in Kankara, Katsina State.
  - Two people are killed in an attack by gunmen in Gamdum Mallam, Zamfara State.
- 24 August – At least 35 militants are reported killed in airstrikes in Kumshe, Borno State, near the border with Cameroon.
- 26 August –
  - The government imposes a six-month ban on the export of raw shea nuts as part of efforts to promote domestic industry.
  - A passenger train derails in Abuja, killing one person and injuring six others.
- 29 August – At least 13 people die and 22 go missing when an overcrowded boat sinks in Birnin Magaji, Zamfara State while fleeing attacks by armed men.

=== September ===
- 1 September – A court in Finland sentences exiled Biafran separatist leader Simon Ekpa to six years' imprisonment for terrorism, tax fraud and ethical violations.
- 2 September – Nigeria submits an application for the 2030 Commonwealth Games to be held in Abuja.
- 3 September –
  - A boat sinks after hitting a submerged tree trunk along Kainji Lake in Borgu, Niger State, killing at least 60 passengers.
  - The United States approves $32.5 million in funding for food assistance and nutritional support for internally displaced persons in Nigeria.
  - The Nigerian Air Force conducts an airstrike in the Sambisa Forest, Borno State, killing over 15 Islamist militia fighters and destroying key insurgent facilities.
  - Soldiers repel an ambush on their convoy along the Gubio-Damasak road in Borno State, killing 13 Boko Haram fighters; one soldier is wounded and two trucks are burned.
- 5 September –
  - At least 60 people are killed in an attack by Boko Haram on the village of Darul Jamal in Bama, Borno State.
  - Gunmen attack a convoy in Edo State, killing eight Nigeria Security and Civil Defence Corps (NSCDC) operatives and kidnapping Chinese workers from BUA Cement; four workers are later rescued.
- 7 September – A tanker and a bus collide in Anambra State, killing 12 people and injuring eight others.
- 11 September – Mahmud Muhammad Usman, the leader of the Ansaru group, is sentenced to 15 years' imprisonment for engaging in illegal mining to obtain weapons for the group and carry out terrorist attacks.
- 12 September – Public hospital doctors begin a nationwide five-day strike over unpaid allowances and welfare issues.
- 13 September – A bus carrying wedding guests plunges into a river near Fass, Zamfara State, killing 19 people.
- 15 September – Guinness World Records recognizes chef Hilda Baci as having created the world's largest pot of jollof rice, measuring 8,780 kilograms, in Lagos on 12 September.
- 16 September – At least 10 people are killed in a fire at the seven-storey Afriland Towers in Lagos.
- 17 September – President Tinubu lifts the state of emergency imposed on Rivers State in March and withdraws the suspension of state governor Siminalayi Fubara.
- 25 September –
  - The Supreme Court allows Yahaya Sharif-Aminu, who was sentenced to death for blasphemy in 2020, to file a late appeal.
  - A gold mining pit collapses in Zamfara State, trapping over 100 miners; at least 13 bodies are recovered.
- 27 September – The Petroleum and Natural Gas Senior Staff Association of Nigeria carries out a nationwide strike in protest against the dismissal of 800 employees at the Dangote refinery.
- 28 September – At least 12 forest guards are killed and four injured in a bandit attack in Kwara State.
- 30 September – Twenty-six people are killed in a boat accident on the Niger River in Ibaji, Kogi State.

=== October ===
- 2 October – Boko Haram militants seize the border town of Kirawa in Borno State, burning a military barracks and the district head’s palace.
- 10 October –
  - President Tinubu grants clemency to 175 people and issues posthumous pardons to Herbert Macaulay, Mamman Jiya Vatsa, and members of the Ogoni Nine.
  - Four soldiers are killed and five wounded when troops repel a coordinated attack by Islamist insurgents in Ngamdu, Borno State.
- 16 October – Five police officers and three paramilitaries are killed in an ambush in Tsafe, Zamfara State.
- 20 October – Police in Abuja fire tear gas to disperse protesters led by activist Omoyele Sowore calling for the release of separatist leader Nnamdi Kanu, head of the banned Indigenous People of Biafra.
- 21 October – 2025 Essa fuel tanker explosion: A fuel tanker explosion near Essa Village, Niger State kills at least 35 people after the vehicle overturns and ignites spilled petrol.
- 23 October – At least 50 insurgents are killed as the Nigerian Army repel drone-backed attacks on military positions in Borno and Yobe States.
- 24 October – President Tinubu dismisses the chiefs of the defence, naval and air staff for unspecified reasons.
- 26 October – A bus crashes in Kano State, killing 13 people and injuring five others.
- 28 October – Edwin Achi, an Anglican priest, is abducted along with his wife and daughter in Kaduna State; he is later killed in captivity after a month.
- 29 October – The Al-Qaeda-linked group JNIM carries out its first known attack in Nigeria, killing a soldier and seizing ammunition and cash in Kwara State.

=== November ===
- 4 November –
  - Nineteen bandits, two soldiers, and a vigilante are killed during a firefight in Shanono between the Nigerian Army and bandits.
  - Nigerian and Nigerien soldiers forces repel a Boko Haram and ISWAP attack on an operating base in Borno State, killing at least six insurgents.
- 10 November – The Economic and Financial Crimes Commission issues an arrest warrant for former petroleum minister Timipre Sylva on conspiracy and fraud charges of US$14.85 million allocated for a refinery project.
- 11 November –
  - Authorities announce the seizure 1,000 kg (2,200 lb) of cocaine valued at over 338 billion naira ($235 million) from a container at the Tin Can Island Port in Lagos.
  - The federal government announces the cancellation of the three-year-old mother-tongue-medium education policy, reinstating English as the medium of instruction from pre-primary level onward.
- 15 November – Gunmen raid a girls’ boarding school in Kebbi State, killing the vice principal and abducting 25 students; one student manages to escape, while authorities report 10 days later that the remaining students were released.
- 16 November – The National Drug Law Enforcement Agency seizes 20 kilograms of cocaine that originated in Brazil from a Panamanian-flagged vessel in Lagos, resulting in the arrest of 20 Filipino crew.
- 17 November –
  - ISWAP claims to have captured and killed an army brigadier-general near Wajiroko, Borno State.
  - The Museum of Fine Arts, Boston returns two of its Benin Bronzes to Nigeria.
- 18 November – Two people are killed in a gun attack on a church in Eruku, Kwara State. Officials later confirm the kidnapping of 38 worshippers, with a ransom demand made.
- 20 November –
  - A federal court sentences separatist leader Nnamdi Kanu to life imprisonment on seven terrorism-related charges.
  - Authorities in Kwara State order the temporary closure of schools in five districts following the 18 November armed church attack.
- 21 November – Gunmen abduct 303 students and 12 teachers from St. Mary’s Catholic School in Niger State; 50 of the students escape two days later.
- 25 November – Gunmen abduct 10 people from the village of Isapa in Kwara State.
- 26 November – President Tinubu declares a nationwide security emergency, ordering 20,000 new police recruits.
- 29 November – Gunmen abduct 14 people from the village of Chacho in Sokoto State.

=== December ===
- 1 December – Mohammed Badaru Abubakar resigns as defence minister, citing health grounds amid criticism over the government's response to the kidnapping crisis.
- 4 December – A Catholic priest is abducted from his residence in Rumi, Kaduna State.
- 6 December – A Dassault/Dornier Alpha Jet of the Nigerian Air Force crashes during a routine test flight in Niger State. Both pilots safely eject.
- 7 December – President Tinubu authorizes the Nigerian Armed Forces to carry out a military intervention in neighbouring Benin to support the country's government following a coup attempt against President Patrice Talon.
- 8 December – Nine women protesting against the government's handling of communal clashes in Adamawa State are shot dead by soldiers in Lamurde.
- 14 December – Gunmen abduct at least 13 worshippers during an attack on a church in Kogi State; a subsequent gunfight with local hunters kills several attackers.
- 16 December –
  - An armed attack on a mining site in Plateau State kills at least 12 people.
  - US President Donald Trump issues a proclamation imposing partial travel restrictions on Nigerian nationals travelling to the United States.
- 21 December —
  - At least 28 people travelling to an Islamic event are abducted by gunmen from a bus in Plateau State.
  - Authorities secure the release of the remaining 130 students and teachers from St Mary's Catholic school in Papiri, Niger State who were abducted by militants.
- 24 December – A bombing at a mosque in Maiduguri kills at least seven people.
- 25 December – The United States launches airstrikes against Islamic State targets in Sokoto State, in a joint operation involving the Nigerian authorities.
- 27 December – Bandits detonate multiple suspected IEDs along the Magami–Yar’Tasha–Dansadau highway in Zamfara State, killing at least 10 people.
- 29 December – A car carrying boxer Anthony Joshua collides with another vehicle along the Lagos–Ibadan Expressway in Ogun State, killing two people and injuring Joshua.
- 30 December – Former attorney general and justice minister Abubakar Malami is charged with 16 counts of money laundering and conspiracy over transactions worth more than 8 billion naira.

== Holidays ==
- 1 January – New Year's Day
- 30–31 March – Eid al-Fitr
- 18 April – Good Friday
- 20 April – Easter Sunday
- 21 April – Easter Monday
- 1 May – International Workers' Day
- 6–7 June – Eid al-Adha
- 12 June – Democracy Day
- 4 September – Milad un-Nabi
- 1 October – Independence Day
- 25 December – Christmas Day
- 26 December – Boxing Day

== Art and entertainment ==
- List of Nigerian submissions for the Academy Award for Best International Feature Film

== Deaths ==
- 15 January – Adewunmi Onanuga, 59, politician, MP (since 2019).
- 12 April – Christian Chukwu, 74, football player (Enugu Rangers, national team) and manager (national team).
- 6 June –
  - Mike Ejeagha, 95, folk singer and guitarist.
  - Mohammed Uwais, 88, chief justice (1995–2006).
- 3 July – Peter Rufai, 61, football player (Farense, Stationery Stores, national team).
- 7 July – Owolabi Olakulehin, 90, Olubadan (since 2024).
- 13 July –
  - Muhammadu Buhari, 82, military head of state (1983–1985), president (2015–2023), and governor of Borno State (1975–1976).
  - Sikiru Kayode Adetona, 91, Awujale of the Ijẹbu Kingdom (since 1960).
- 19 August – Razak Omotoyossi, 39, footballer (Sheriff Tiraspol, Helsingborg, Benin national team).
- 24 September – Oskar Ibru, 67, chairman and CEO of the Ibru Organization (since 2016).
- 13 October – Joy Ogwu, 79, foreign minister (2006–2007) and permanent representative to the United Nations (2008–2017).
- 18 November – Okechukwu Ezea, 62, senator (since 2023).
- 16 December – Tanko Muhammad, 71, chief justice (2019–2022) and justice of the supreme court (2007–2022).
- 31 December – Godiya Akwashiki, 52, senator (since 2019).
