= 2025 Essa fuel tanker explosion =

Fuel tanker explosion in Nigeria

- Date: 21 October 2025
- Time: ~3:45 p.m. (UTC Offset +01:00)
- Location: Near Essa, Niger State, Nigeria
- Type: Tank truck explosion
- Cause: Poor road conditions
- Deaths: ≥42
- Injuries: ≥60
- Property damage: Millions of naira (estimated)

On the late morning of 21 October 2025, a tanker truck carrying petrol lost control and overturned on the Bida–Agaie stretch of the A124 highway near Essa Village, Niger State, Nigeria. The truck started to spill its contents, and locals began collecting fuel. In the early afternoon, the fuel ignited, causing an explosion that killed at least 42 people and injured a further 60. The explosion damaged nearby vehicles and structures, causing damages estimated to be in the millions of naira.

== Background ==
A lack of pipeline infrastructure in Nigeria means that fossil fuel products are primarily transported by road. One of the busiest highways in Niger State is the Bida–Diko stretch of the A124 highway. It is a major corridor linking Nigeria's North-Central region to the Federal Capital Territory. The highway serves as the only road through which petrol tankers from Lagos reach northern Nigeria. The Bida–Diko stretch of highway had become notorious for fatal accidents and poor traffic. Other sections of the highway have been rehabilitated, with a 50-kilometre (31 mi) stretch remaining in poor condition.

Since the removal of fuel subsidies under Nigerian president Bola Tinubu, scavenging for petrol became more common in Nigeria as fuel prices rose. In the year prior to the explosion, over 400 people were killed in tanker explosions across Nigeria. After over 98 people were killed in a tanker explosion at Dikko junction while collecting leaking fuel in January 2025, Tinubu ordered a nationwide awareness campaign on the risks of fuel scooping.

== Explosion ==
The tanker was transporting petroleum products from Lagos to northern Nigeria. While driving on the Bida–Agaie stretch of highway, it lost control on a deteriorated section of road, skidded, and overturned between 11:00 a.m. and 12:00 p.m. near Essa Village and about 4 kilometres (2.5 mi) from Badeggi Town. Local residents arrived to the site to collect the spilling fuel with jerry cans, buckets, and plastic bags. Local accounts describe other bystanders frantically warning people to avoid the leaking tanker.

Around 3:45 p.m., the fuel ignited, leading to an explosion. The explosion engulfed and destroyed several vehicles and shops and killed nearby livestock. The Punch and the Premium Times reported that damages to property were worth millions of naira.

== Victims ==
At least 42 people were killed in the explosion, and over 60 were injured with burns of varying degrees of severity. Victims came from nearby villages such as Essa, Amude, and Angulu. Many victims' bodies were burned beyond recognition.

== Response ==
The Federal Road Safety Corps (FRSC) mobilised rescue operations in response to the explosion; however, their response was slowed by the poor condition of the highway. Injured people were initially evacuated to Essa Primary Health Care and Idris Private Hospital; they were later brought to the Umaru Sanda General Hospital and Federal Medical Centre in Bida by FRSC personnel and locals. Local police and personnel from the National Emergency Management Agency, Niger State Emergency Management Authority, Nigeria Security and Civil Defence Corps, and the Department of State Services also assisted in transporting victims. Fourteen people who were critically injured were transferred to Gwagwalada Specialist Hospital for further treatment. The deceased were buried in a mass grave in Katcha, and a special prayer was conducted.

Police public relations officer Wasiu Abiodun stated that investigations were started to identify the tanker's driver and owner.

Governor of Niger State Mohammed Umar Bago, governor of Lagos State Babajide Sanwo-Olu, and the Nigerian Governors' Forum offered their condolences to the families of the victims. In a statement signed by the Minister of Information and National Orientation, Mohammed Idris Malagi, the Federal Government of Nigeria expressed its condolences for the victims. Officials from the Federal Ministry of Works visited Essan Village to deliver condolences and offerings of prayers.

A motion sponsored by representative Saidu Musa Abdullahi was adopted by the House of Representatives on 22 October. The motion called for the Federal Roads Maintenance Agency to commence rehabilitation and expansion of the road; required the FRSC to increase safety standards for fuel tankers; and called for the National Emergency Management Agency to distribute medical assistance and relief to the affected. On 23 October, Bago announced donations of ₦1 million (US$680) to each family of the deceased and ₦500,000 (US$340) to each of the injured. The Niger state government approved free medical treatment for the victims and provided ₦10 million (US$6,800) in medical supplies to the supporting hospitals.

Bago condemned the act of fuel scooping as dangerous and criminal, which was repeated by the Niger state government. Idris expressed sadness at the failure to heed warnings about fuel scooping. FRSC corps marshal Shehu Mohammed urged people to avoid collecting spilled fuel, stating that most high-fatality crashes in 2024 were linked to the activity. He encouraged reporting crashes involving tankers or hazardous materials to the FRSC. Lanre Issa-Onilu stated in an interview that the National Orientation Agency—where he is director-general—had met with the Nigeria Union of Petroleum and Natural Gas Workers to find solutions to curb scooping.
