= 2023 in Nigeria =

- Decades: 2000s; 2010s; 2020s
- See also: Other events of 2023; Timeline of Nigerian history

Events in the year 2023 in Nigeria.

== Incumbents ==
=== Federal government ===
- President: Muhammadu Buhari (APC) (ended 29 May); Bola Tinubu (APC) (Started 29 May)
- Vice President: Yemi Osinbajo (APC) (ended 29 May); Kashim Shettima (APC) (Started 29 May)
- Senate President: Ahmed Lawan (APC) (ended 11 June); Godswill Akpabio (APC) (Started 13 June)
- House Speaker: Femi Gbajabiamila (APC) (ended 11 June); Tajudeen Abbas (APC) (Started 13 June)
- Chief Justice: Olukayode Ariwoola

=== Governors ===
- Abia State: Okezie Ikpeazu (PDP) (Until 29 May); Alex Otti (LP) (Starting 29 May)
- Adamawa State: Ahmadu Umaru Fintiri (PDP)
- Akwa Ibom State: Udom Emmanuel (PDP) (Until 29 May); Umo Eno (PDP) (Starting 29 May)
- Anambra State: Charles Soludo (APGA)
- Bauchi State: Bala Mohammed (PDP)
- Bayelsa State: Douye Diri (PDP)
- Benue State: Samuel Ortom (PDP) (Until 29 May); Hyacinth Alia (APC) (Starting 29 May)
- Borno State: Babagana Zulum (APC)
- Cross River State: Benedict Ayade (APC) (Until 29 May); Bassey Otu (APC) (Starting 29 May)
- Delta State: Ifeanyi Okowa (PDP) (Until 29 May); Sheriff Oborevwori (PDP) (Starting 29 May)
- Ebonyi State: Dave Umahi (APC) (Until 29 May); Francis Nwifuru (APC) (Starting 29 May)
- Edo State: Godwin Obaseki (PDP)
- Ekiti State: Biodun Oyebanji (APC)
- Enugu State: Ifeanyi Ugwuanyi (PDP) (Until 29 May); Peter Mbah (PDP) (Starting 29 May)
- Gombe State: Muhammad Inuwa Yahaya (APC)
- Imo State: Hope Uzodinma (APC)
- Jigawa State: Badaru Abubakar (APC) (Until 29 May); Umar Namadi (APC) (Starting 29 May)
- Kaduna State: Nasir El-Rufai (APC) (Until 29 May); Uba Sani (APC) (Starting 29 May)
- Kano State: Abdullahi Umar Ganduje (APC) (Until 29 May); Abba Kabir Yusuf (NNPP) (Starting 29 May)
- Katsina State: Aminu Bello Masari (APC) (Until 29 May); Dikko Umaru Radda (APC) (Starting 29 May)
- Kebbi State: Abubakar Atiku Bagudu (APC) (Until 29 May); Nasir Idris (APC) (Starting 29 May)
- Kogi State: Yahaya Bello (APC)
- Kwara State: AbdulRahman AbdulRasaq (APC)
- Lagos State: Babajide Sanwo-Olu (APC)
- Nasarawa State: Abdullahi Sule (APC)
- Niger State: Abubakar Sani Bello (APC) (Until 29 May); Mohammed Umar Bago (APC) (Starting 29 May)
- Ogun State: Dapo Abiodun (APC)
- Ondo State: Rotimi Akeredolu (APC) (Until 27 December); Lucky Aiyedatiwa (APC) (Starting 27 December)
- Osun State: Ademola Adeleke (PDP)
- Oyo State: Seyi Makinde (PDP)
- Plateau State: Simon Lalong (APC) (Until 29 May); Caleb Mutfwang (PDP) (Starting 29 May)
- Rivers State: Nyesom Wike (PDP) (Until 29 May); Siminalayi Fubara (PDP) (Starting 29 May)
- Sokoto State: Aminu Waziri Tambuwal (PDP) (Until 29 May); Ahmad Aliyu (APC) (Starting 29 May)
- Taraba State: Darius Ishaku (PDP) (Until 29 May); Agbu Kefas (PDP) (Starting 29 May)
- Yobe State: Mai Mala Buni (APC)
- Zamfara State: Bello Matawalle (APC) (Until 29 May); Dauda Lawal (PDP) (Starting 29 May)

== Events ==
- 25 January – At least 27 herders are killed, and several others are injured, when a bomb explodes in Nasarawa State. Some herders say it was caused by an airstrike.
- 29 January – At least nine people are killed when a container falls from a truck onto a commercial bus in Lagos.
- 4 February-ongoing – 2023 Nigerian protests begin began due to the naira, and protests due to the election.
- 25 February – 2023 Nigerian general election - Nigerians elect a new president and members of their National Assembly.
- 3 March – Sixteen people are killed when a pipeline explodes in Emohua, Rivers State.
- 9 March – Six people are killed and at least 25 others injured when a train collides with a public bus in Lagos.
- 11 March – Herder–farmer conflicts in Nigeria: Sixteen people are killed by Fula gunmen at a police checkpoint in Zangon Kataf, Kaduna State.
- 18 March – 2023 Nigerian gubernatorial and state of assembly election are held.
- 15–16 March – At least 100 people are killed in Mangu LGA, Plateau State.
- 16 March – An ambush kills four members of a United States convoy in Anambra State.
- May 2023 – Hilda Baci breaks the world record for the longest cooking marathon by an individual, cooking for 93 hours and 11 minutes from May 11 to May 15, 2023. She surpassed the previous record of 87 hours and 45 minutes.
- 13 June – Kwara boat disaster: At least 100 people are killed when a wedding boat capsizes on the Niger River in Kwara State.
- 7 July – Health officers confirm an outbreak of diphtheria in the capital Abuja following the death of a four-year-old. According to NCDC, nearly 800 cases of the disease have been confirmed in the country as of 30 June.
- 4 September – The 13-kilometre-long (8.1-mile) Lagos Rail Mass Transit Blue Line rapid transit system begins service in Lagos, after being delayed since 1983.
- 2 October – At least 18 people are killed in an explosion at an illegal oil refinery in Emohua district, Rivers State.
- 20 October – Two children were killed and two others injured when a mechanical issue causes a boat engine to catch fire. The incident occurred Katcha, Niger State.
- 29 October – Seventeen bodies are found, and 73 other people were missing when a boat carrying traders returning from a fish market capsizes on the Benue River. The boat had over 100 passengers on board, 14 of whom are rescued.
- 30 October – 2023 Yobe State attacks: At least seventeen people are killed in Gurokayeya, Yobe State when Boko Haram-aligned gunmen storm the village, attacking residents with explosives and firearms when they reportedly refuse to a pay a tax to the terrorists.
- 31 October – At least 20 people are killed when a land mine placed by Boko Haram explodes while they return from the burials of victims from the previous day's shooting.
- 6 November – Two people are killed and two others injured when a tanker explodes outside the High Commission of Canada in Abuja.
- 16 November:
  - Clashes with police and members of the Islamic Movement during a pro-Palestine protest leave one dead and several injured in Kaduna.
  - A boat accident in Shioro LGA, Niger State, kills at least ten people. 24 others were rescued from the scene.
- 21 November – At least 25 people are killed and about 200 were injured in a vehicle crash on the Yawuri Expressway in Magama, Niger State.
- 3 December – Tudun Biri drone strike: A drone strike on a village in Kaduna State mistakenly kills 85 civilians.
- 13 December – Four soldiers and two civilian drivers are killed and two South Korean workers are kidnapped in an ambush against a convoy in Rivers State.
- 23–25 December - Nigerian bandit conflict: 2023 Plateau State massacres

== Deaths ==
- 9 January – Peace Anyiam-Osigwe, 53, filmmaker and entertainment executive.
- 14 January – Femi Ogunrombi, actor and ethnomusicologist.
- 19 January – Oladipo Ogunlesi, 99, professor of medicine.
- 1 February – Dan Suleiman, 80, politician, governor of Plateau State (1976–1978).
- 12 September – MohBad, 27, musician.
- 20 October – Alhaji Mansur Nuhu Bamalli, 42, Nigerian ambassador to Morocco.
- 8 November – Aderonke Kale, 84, Nigerian army physicist and first female major-general in the Nigerian Army.
- 27 December – Rotimi Akeredolu, governor of Ondo State (2017–2023).

== See also ==
- 2023 in West Africa
- List of Nigerian films of 2023
