= Ekene =

Ekene is a unisex given name. Notable people with the name include:

- Ekene Abubakar Adams (1985–2024), Nigerian politician
- Ekene Ibekwe (born 1985), American-Nigerian basketball player
- Ekene Ikenwa (born 1977), Nigerian footballer
- Ekene Obi (born 2003), Nigerian blogger and pharmacist
- Ekene Umenwa (born 1991), Nigerian actress
- Ekene Okoli (born 1980) Nigerian CEO
