= Ilorin Emirate Durbar =

Festival in Nigeria

Ilorin Emirate Durbar festival
- Location: Yoruba Region
- Country: Nigeria

Ilorin Emirate Durbar is an annual festival celebrated in Ilorin following the Muslim celebration of Eid al-Adha.

== History ==
The Ilorin Durbar has it root in 1830s. It was instituted as a way to commemorate Ilorin's military victory against the combined forces of the old Oyo Empire and the Baruba people. Emir Sulu Gambari revived the celebration in 2018.
