= 2027 in Nigeria =

- Decades: 2000s; 2010s; 2020s
- See also: Other events of 2027; Timeline of Nigerian history

Events in the year 2027 in Nigeria.

== Events ==
=== Scheduled ===
- 16 January – 2027 Nigerian general election
- 6 February – Solar eclipse of February 6, 2027 (total eclipse)

== Holidays ==
- 1 January – New Year's Day
- 9–10 March – Eid al-Fitr
- 26 March – Good Friday
- 29 March – Easter Monday
- 1 May – International Workers' Day
- 16–17 May – Eid al-kabir
- 12 June – Democracy Day
- 14 August – Milad un-Nabi
- 1 October – Independence Day
- 25 December – Christmas Day
- 26 December – Boxing Day
