= Oluwa Forest Reserve =

Tourist and Conservation site located in Nigeria

- Location within Nigeria
- Location: Ondo State, Nigeria
- Nearest city: Ore
- Coordinates: 6°49′23″N 4°40′26″E
- Area: 829 km^{2} (320 sq mi)

Oluwa Forest Reserve is located in Ondo State, Nigeria and covers over 829 km^{2} (320 sq mi). It is part of the Omo, Shasha and Oluwa forest reserves, although it has become separated from the Omo and Shasha reserves (which are still connected as of 2011). The three reserves contain some of the last remaining forest in the area. Although they are biologically unique, they are threatened by logging, hunting and agriculture. The natural vegetation of the area is tropical rainforest. However, the natural vegetation of the area except for the areas devoted to forest reserve has now been reduced to secondary regrowth forest and fallow regrowth at varying stages of development or replaced by perennial and annual crops.

== Climate ==
Oluwa Forest Reserve experiences a tropical climate characterized by significant rainfall throughout most of the year, with a relatively short dry season that has minimal impact. According to the Köppen-Geiger climate classification, Oluwa Forest Reserve falls under the Am category. The reserve's proximity to the equator makes it challenging to distinctly define seasons, with the summers presenting unique variations. The optimal time for travel to the forest reserve is identified as the months of January, April, May, July, August, September, October, November, and December.

The average annual temperature in Oluwa Forest Reserve is 25.9 °C (78.5 °F), with a notable amount of precipitation totalling approximately 2339 mm (92.1 inches) annually. The city experiences a distinctive pattern in rainfall, with the least amount occurring in January, measuring at 44 mm (1.7 inches), and the highest in June, reaching an average of 302 mm (11.9 inches). This variation contributes to an overall precipitation difference of 258 mm (10 inches) between the driest and wettest months. The temperatures in Oluwa Forest Reserve exhibit seasonal fluctuations, with February being the warmest month, averaging around 27.4 °C (81.2 °F), while August stands out as the coldest month with temperatures averaging 24.2 °C (75.6 °F).

In terms of humidity, Oluwa Forest Reserve experiences its highest relative humidity in June, reaching 89.93%, while January sees the lowest humidity levels at 70.50%. The wettest month in the forest reserve is July, with an average of 28.40 rainy days, whereas January is the driest, with 11.50 rainy days. This city's climate also reflects variations in the duration of sunshine, with January receiving the most sunlight at an average of 7.49 hours per day and an annual total of 232.26 hours. In contrast, January also witnesses the least daily sunshine hours, averaging 3.76, accumulating to a total of 116.58 hours during the month.

Climate data for Oluwa Forest Reserve (Oniparaga)
Month	Jan	Feb	Mar	Apr	May	Jun	Jul	Aug	Sep	Oct	Nov	Dec	Year
Mean daily maximum °C (°F)	32.6 (90.7)	32.4 (90.3)	31.5 (88.7)	31 (87)	29.7 (85.5)	28.2 (82.8)	27.3 (81.2)	27 (81)	27.9 (82.3)	29.1 (84.4)	30.2 (86.4)	32 (89)	29.9 (85.8)
Daily mean °C (°F)	26.8 (80.3)	27.3 (81.2)	27.3 (81.2)	26.8 (80.3)	26 (79)	24.9 (76.9)	24.3 (75.8)	24.2 (75.6)	24.6 (76.2)	25.2 (77.3)	26.1 (78.9)	26.6 (79.8)	25.8 (78.5)
Mean daily minimum °C (°F)	22.5 (72.5)	24 (75)	24.6 (76.3)	24.4 (75.9)	23.8 (74.8)	22.9 (73.3)	22.4 (72.3)	22.3 (72.1)	22.4 (72.4)	23 (73)	23.2 (73.8)	22.7 (72.9)	23.2 (73.7)
Average precipitation cm (inches)	2.5 (1)	5.1 (2)	13 (5)	20 (8)	25 (10)	28 (11)	28 (11)	23 (9)	28 (11)	25 (10)	10 (4)	2.5 (1)	210.1 (83)
Average rainy days	9	12	19	20	21	21	21	21	21	21	17	10	213
Average relative humidity (%)	71	77	83	86	89	90	89	88	89	89	87	78	85
Mean daily sunshine hours	7.5	6.8	6.4	6.1	5.5	4.3	4.2	3.8	3.9	4.6	5.4	7.2	5.5
Source: climate-data.org

== Oluwa Forest Degradation ==
Many of Nigeria's forest reserves, including Oluwa Forest Reserve, endure ongoing unsustainable activities such as timber logging, fuelwood collection, the harvesting of economically valuable plants, hunting for bushmeat, and the exploitation of other resources.

== Economic Importance ==
The forest holds significant economic importance for the region and the country as a whole. This importance can be attributed to various factors, which are outlined below:

1. Biodiversity and Ecotourism: Oluwa Forest Reserve is home to a rich diversity of flora and fauna, including rare and endangered species. This biodiversity attracts tourists and researchers, contributing to the local economy. Revenue generated from ecotourism activities, such as wildlife safaris and bird watching, provides jobs and income for local communities.
2. Timber and Non-Timber Forest Products: The reserve contains valuable timber species, including mahogany, iroko, and teak. These trees are harvested sustainably, providing a source of income for the forestry industry. Additionally, various non-timber forest products such as fruits, nuts, and medicinal plants are gathered from the forest and sold in local markets.
3. Carbon Sequestration and Climate Change Mitigation: Forests like Oluwa play a crucial role in mitigating climate change by absorbing and storing carbon dioxide. As the global community places more emphasis on carbon offsets and emissions reduction, the economic value of these forests in carbon sequestration becomes increasingly evident. This may lead to international funding for conservation efforts.
4. Watershed Protection: The Oluwa Forest Reserve serves as a vital water catchment area, protecting local watersheds. Healthy forests help maintain water quality and regulate water flow, which is crucial for agricultural activities and the provision of clean drinking water. Maintaining the reserve's integrity contributes to the economic well-being of the communities that rely on these water resources.
5. Agriculture and Livelihoods: The communities surrounding the Oluwa Forest Reserve depend on the forest for various aspects of their livelihoods. They engage in farming, hunting, and fishing, with the forest providing critical resources and acting as a safety net during periods of economic hardship.
6. Research and Education: The reserve offers unique opportunities for scientific research and environmental education. Educational institutions and researchers often visit the area, leading to collaborations and grants that support local economies and contribute to the national knowledge base.
7. Conservation and Sustainable Development: The conservation of Oluwa Forest Reserve aligns with broader international and national conservation goals. This preservation ensures the long-term availability of forest resources, contributing to the sustainable development of the region and the country.
8. Job Creation: The various economic activities related to the Oluwa Forest Reserve, such as ecotourism, sustainable logging, and forest management, create employment opportunities for local communities. These jobs provide individuals with income, enhancing their economic stability.
9. Cultural and Spiritual Value: The forest reserve holds cultural and spiritual significance for local communities. Preserving the forest's natural and cultural heritage supports traditional practices and rituals, promoting a sense of identity and community.

== Conservation Efforts ==
Preserving the rich biodiversity of this forest is become a priority and it includes supporting local communities, and ensuring the sustainable use of its resources. These efforts involve a combination of strategies and specific actions, which are outlined below:

1. Protected Area Management: The Oluwa Forest Reserve is designated as a protected area, which means it is legally safeguarded from activities that could harm the environment. This includes the enforcement of regulations against illegal logging, poaching, and encroachment. Rangers and enforcement teams are responsible for monitoring and maintaining the protected status of the area.
2. Biodiversity Monitoring: Regular surveys and research are conducted by researchers, ecologists, and conservationists to monitor the biodiversity within the reserve. This involves tracking the populations of various plant and animal species, especially endangered and endemic ones. Data from these studies are used to inform conservation strategies.
3. Habitat Restoration: Restoration efforts include reforestation and afforestation projects to rehabilitate degraded areas that have been affected by human activities, such as deforestation or agriculture and create new habitats for wildlife. Native tree species are often replanted to restore the reserve's ecological balance.
4. Anti-Poaching Initiatives: Anti-poaching teams and ranger patrols are established to combat illegal hunting and trapping of wildlife within the reserve. This helps protect species like the Nigeria-Cameroon chimpanzee and forest elephants.
5. Community Engagement: Local communities living near the Oluwa Forest Reserve are engaged in conservation efforts. They are educated about the importance of the forest, provided with alternative livelihood options, and encouraged to become stewards of the reserve.
6. Sustainable Logging Practices: Sustainable forestry management practices are implemented to regulate and reduce the impact of timber harvesting. This includes selective logging, reforestation after timber extraction, and the promotion of certified sustainable wood products.
7. Ecotourism Development: To generate income for the reserve and local communities, ecotourism initiatives are developed. This involves creating nature trails, observation points, and eco-lodges to attract tourists and researchers interested in the reserve's unique biodiversity.
8. Research and Education: The reserve is a hub for scientific research and environmental education. Research institutions and NGOs collaborate to study the forest's ecosystems and provide educational programs for local schools and communities.
9. Climate Change Mitigation: Oluwa Forest Reserve plays a vital role in carbon sequestration and climate change mitigation. Efforts to preserve and manage the forest help in reducing greenhouse gas emissions and attract funding through carbon offset projects.
10. International Collaboration: Conservation organizations often collaborate with international partners to secure funding and expertise. These partnerships facilitate the exchange of knowledge and resources to enhance the reserve's protection.
11. Fire Management: Controlled fire management is employed to prevent uncontrolled wildfires. This involves controlled burns and firebreaks to protect the forest and its biodiversity.
12. Legislation and Policy Advocacy: Conservationists advocate for policies that support the preservation of the Oluwa Forest Reserve and its ecosystem. They work to strengthen legal protections and promote sustainable land-use planning.
13. Cultural Preservation: Efforts are made to respect and preserve the cultural significance of the forest for local communities. Traditional practices and rituals are integrated into conservation strategies to maintain cultural identity.

== Activities and Attractions ==
The Oluwa Forest Reserve is a popular tourist destination for nature lovers and adventure seekers alike. Here are some of the activities and attractions that visitors can enjoy:

- Hiking: There are a variety of hiking trails to choose from, ranging from easy to challenging. Some of the most popular trails include the Omo River Trail, the Erin Camp Trail, and the Olokemeji Forest Trail. Hikers can enjoy the lush rainforest scenery, spot wildlife, and learn about the local flora and fauna from experienced guides.
- Camping: There are several designated camping areas within the forest reserve, where visitors can pitch their tents and spend the night under the stars. Camping is a great way to experience the forest's natural beauty and serenity.
- Birdwatching: The Oluwa Forest Reserve is home to over 300 species of birds, making it a paradise for birdwatchers. Some of the most notable bird species include the African grey parrot, the hornbill, and the kingfisher. Visitors can join guided birdwatching tours or explore the forest on their own to try to spot as many different species as possible.
- Wildlife viewing: The Oluwa Forest Reserve is also home to a variety of other wildlife, including chimpanzees, monkeys, snakes, and lizards. Visitors can join guided wildlife viewing tours or explore the forest on their own to try to spot as many different animals as possible.

== See also ==
- Shasha Forest Reserve
