= List of Nigerian films of 2023 =

This is a list of Nigerian films released in 2023.

== 2023 ==
=== January–March ===
Opening		Title	Director	Cast	Genre	Notes	Ref.
January	13	The Trade	Jadesola Osiberu	Rita Dominic Chiwetalu Agu Blossom Chukwujekwu Gideon Okeke Nengi Adoki	Crime drama	Based on true events	
January	23	Mami Wata	C. J. Obasi	Evelyne Ily Juhen Rita Edochie Uzoamaka Aniunoh Kelechi Udegbe	Fantasy	Based on West African folklore	
February	3	Dark October	Toka McBaror	Chuks Joseph Munachi Okpara Oriaku Kelechukwu James		Based on the Aluu Four lynching	
March							

=== April–June ===
Opening	Title	Director	Cast	Genre	Notes	Ref.
April						
May						
June						

=== July–September ===
Opening	Title	Director	Cast	Genre	Notes	Ref.
July						
August						
September						

=== October–December ===
Opening		Title	Director	Cast	Genre	Notes	Ref.
October							
November							
December	1	Áfàméfùnà: An Nwa Boi Story	Kayode Kasum	Stan Nze, Kanayo O. Kanayo, Alexx Ekubo, Atlanta Bridget Johnson, Segun Arinze	Drama	Language: Igbo	

== See also ==
- 2023 in Nigeria
- List of Nigerian films
