= 2024 Majiya fuel tanker explosion =

Fuel tanker explosion in Nigeria

- Date: 15 October 2024
- Time: ~11 p.m. (WAT - UTC +1)
- Location: Majiya, Jigawa State, Nigeria; 12.309°N 9.464°E
- Type: Tank truck explosion
- Cause: Fire
- Deaths: 209
- Injuries: 124
- Property damage: Millions of Naira
- Displaced: 334+

On 15 October 2024, a fuel tanker exploded in Majiya, Jigawa State, Nigeria, killing 209 people and injuring 124 others.

== Explosion ==
The involved tanker came from Kano and had driven around 110 kilometers on its way to Yobe State on 15 October. While traveling on an expressway near the town of Majiya in Jigawa State, the tanker overturned while attempting to avoid crashing into a truck, causing petrol to spill onto the road. Many villagers came to the scene and tried to scoop up the spilled petrol, some source claiming a generator was in use in order to collect the petrol. Within minutes, a fire started and an explosion followed. Video footage showed a massive fire stretching along a large area overnight with burned bodies visible. The fire went out in the morning of 16 October.

== Aftermath ==
167 families were affected by the explosion and the property damage cost millions of Naira.

Haruna Mairiga, the head of the Emergency Management Agency in Jigawa State, said that a mass burial took place for the dead. Police spokesman Lawan Shiisu Adam stated that at least 100 people, many critically, were injured by the explosion and were taken to hospitals in the towns of Ringim and Hadejia. The Nigerian Medical Association urged doctors to go to nearby emergency facilities.

On 17 October mass funerals were organized.

=== Reactions ===
The Senate of Nigeria held a moment of silence. Vice President Kashim Shettima requested a safety review and said that the federal government would send resources to support the affected people.

President Bola Tinubu later said the review will be "swift and comprehensive“. He stated it will be will carried out together with multiple state authorities and that offenders of the new regulations will be punished. Tinubu sent senior government officials including the ministers of defense and transportation to the disaster site, together with food aid and medical supplies.

== See also ==
- Ibadan petrol tanker explosion
- Otedola bridge fire accident
- 2025 Suleja fuel tanker explosion
