= Shasha Forest Reserve =

Nigerian Forest Reserve

- IUCN category V (protected landscape/seascape)

Shasha Forest Reserve is a forest reserve situated in SW Nigeria at an altitude of 146 metres (479 feet). (7° 4' 60 N 4° 30' 0 E).

This is a biologically unique area. It was in danger of deforestation and excessive hunting, so it has been in the protection program since 2007.

== See also ==
- Oluwa Forest Reserve
