= Lagos–Ibadan Expressway =

Expressway in Nigeria

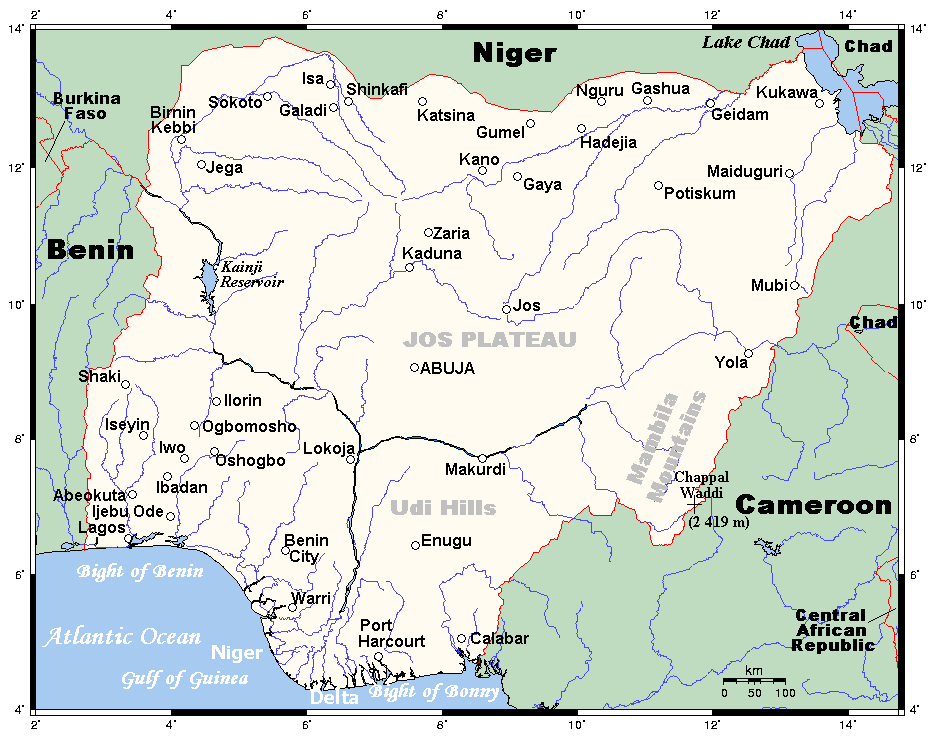

Route information
- History: Completed in August 1978

Major junctions
- North end: Ibadan
- South end: Lagos

Location
- Country: Nigeria
- States: Oyo, Lagos
- Major cities: Ibadan, Lagos

Highway system
- Transport in Nigeria

The Lagos–Ibadan Expressway is a 127.6-kilometre-long (79.3 mi) expressway connecting Ibadan, the capital of Oyo State and Lagos, Nigeria's largest city. It is also the major route to the northern, southern and eastern parts of Nigeria. The expressway is the oldest in Nigeria, commissioned in August 1978 during the Military era, under the administration of Lieutenant-General Olusegun Obasanjo.

The expressway is one of the busiest inter-state routes in Nigeria and handles more than 250,000 PCUs daily and constitutes one of the largest road networks in Africa. It is part of the Federal Roads Maintenance Agency (FERMA) projects, concerned with road improvement and connectivity between the States of Nigeria.

== Reconstruction ==
The reconstruction of the expressway was flagged off in July 2013 by President Goodluck Ebele Jonathan then president of the Federal Republic of Nigeria, to help reduce the travel time of hundreds of thousands of commuters and international air passengers. The contract was awarded to Julius Berger Nigeria and Reynolds Construction Company Limited at a sum of 167 billion Naira, equivalent to $838,986,290. Two sections of the expressway will be reconstructed and this includes Section I (Lagos to Sagamu Interchange) and section II (Sagamu Interchange to Ibadan).

== Gallery ==
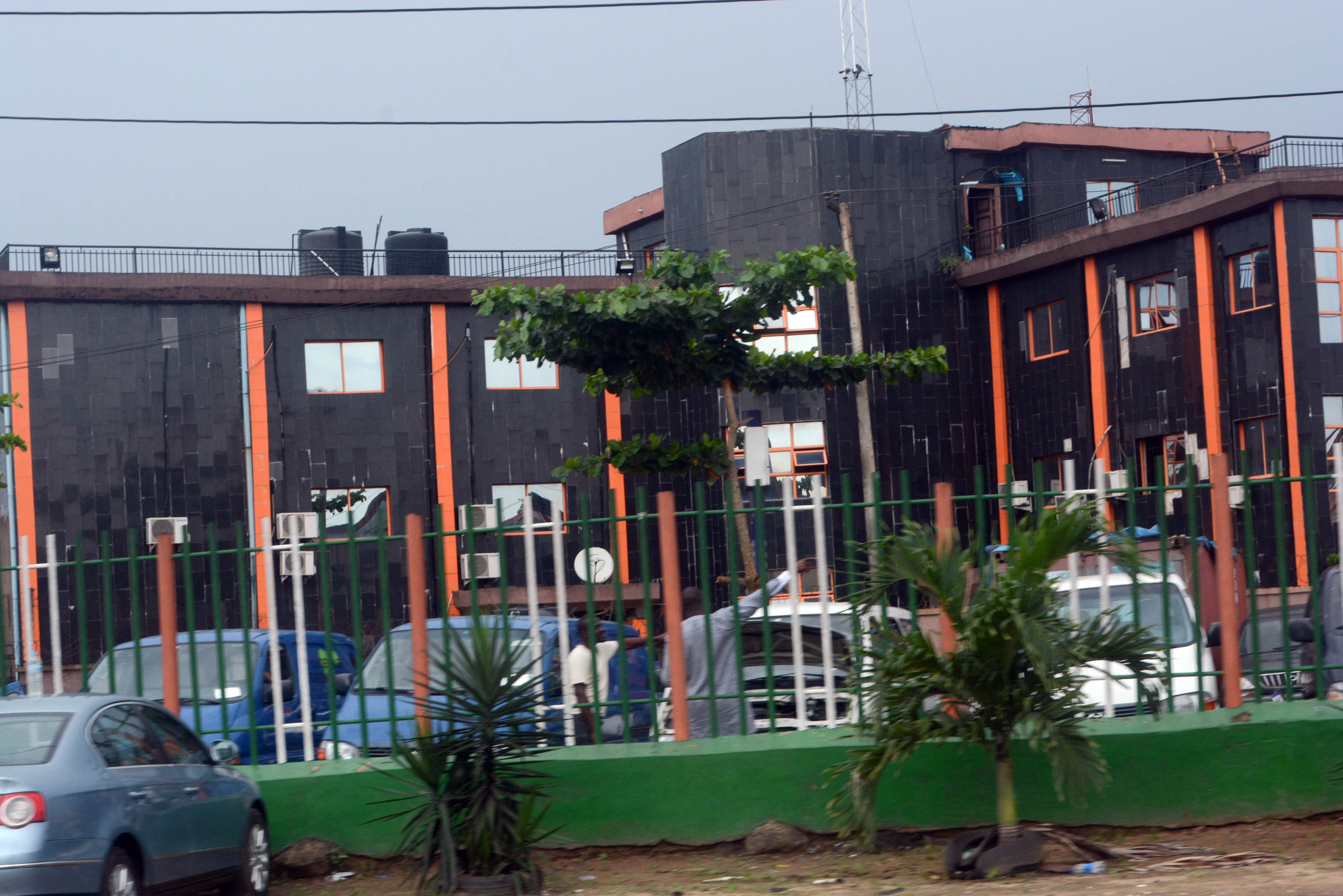
TELL building Berger

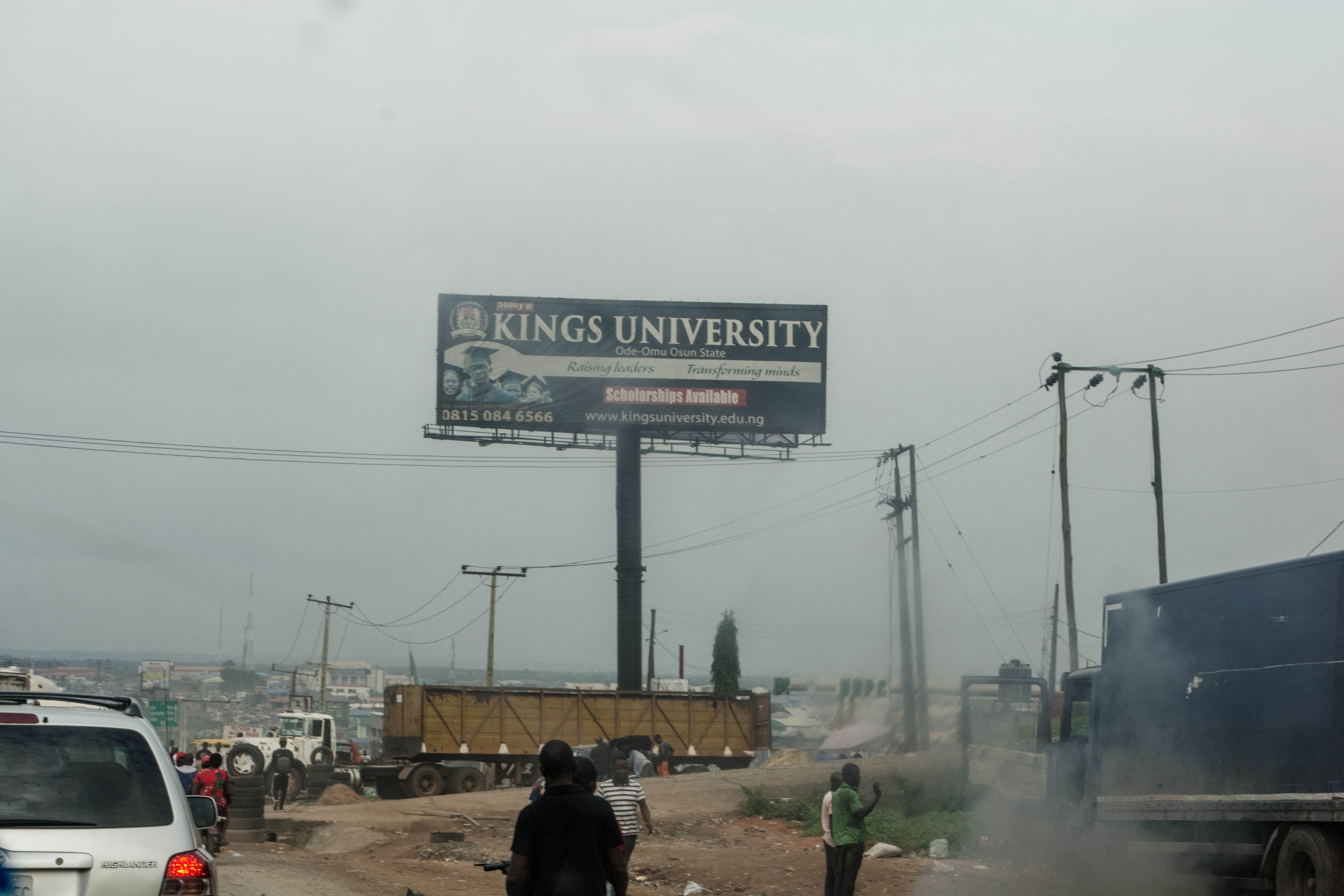
New garrage Berger

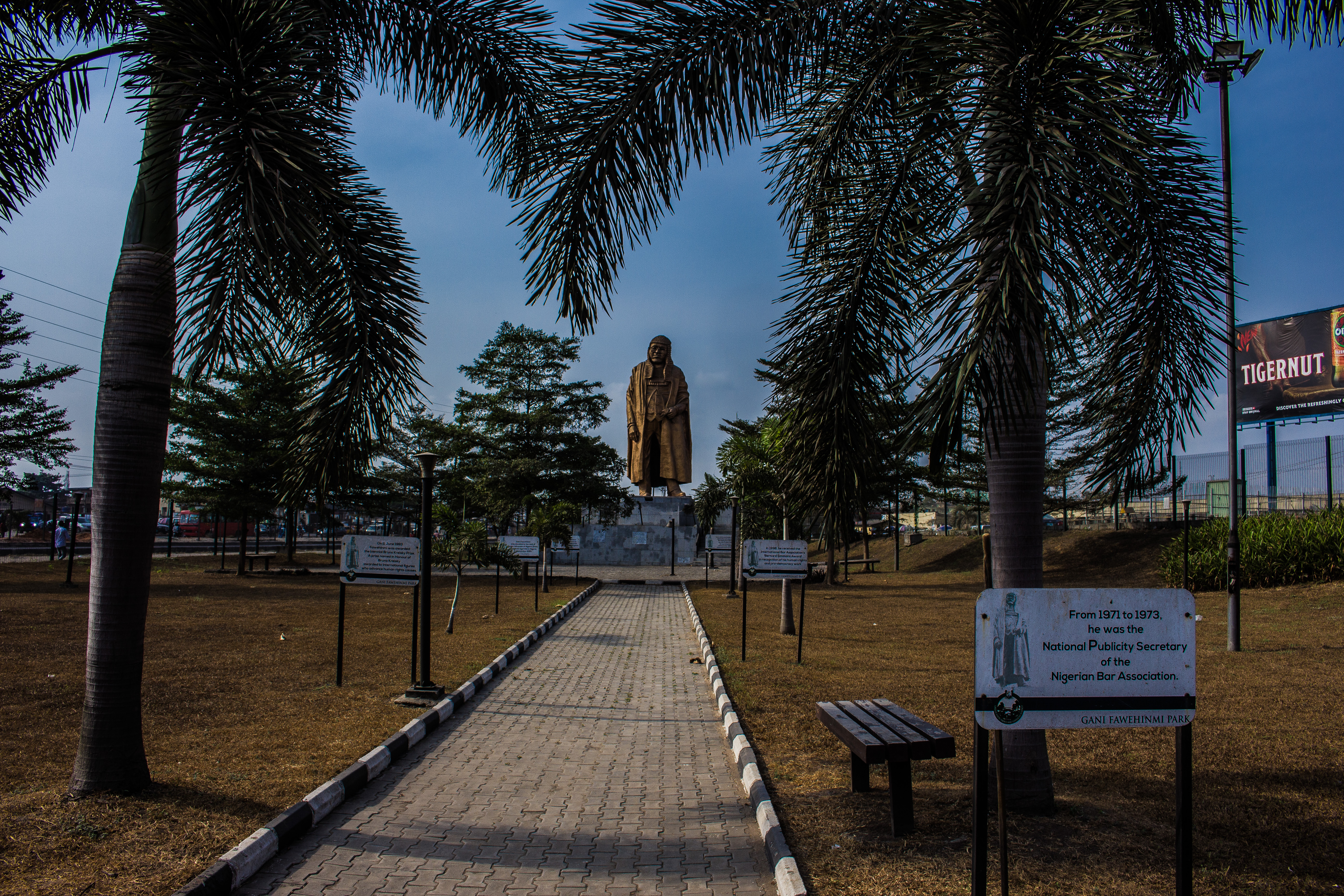
Gani Fawehinmi Park at the interchange with Ikorodu Road

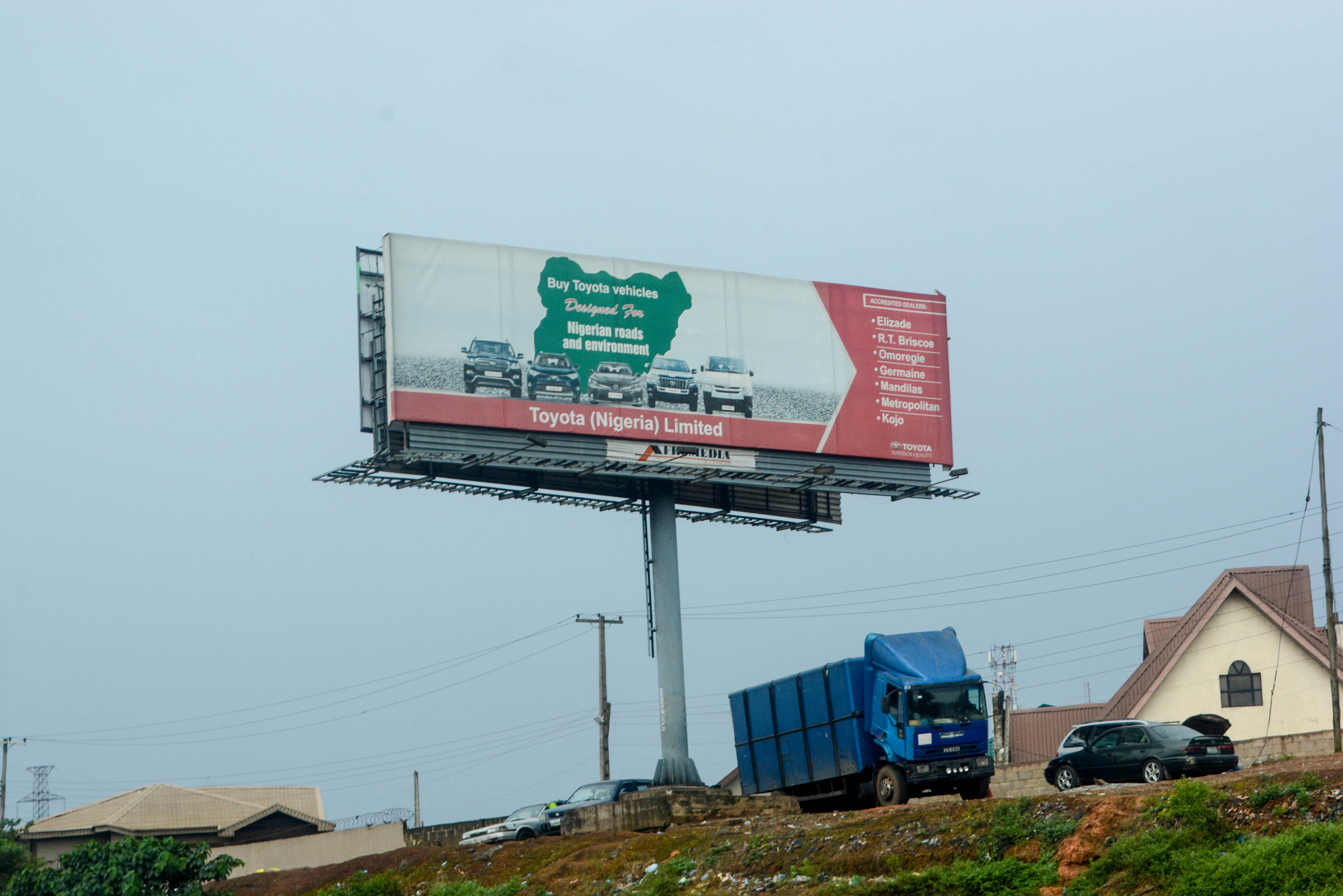
Bill board, New garage

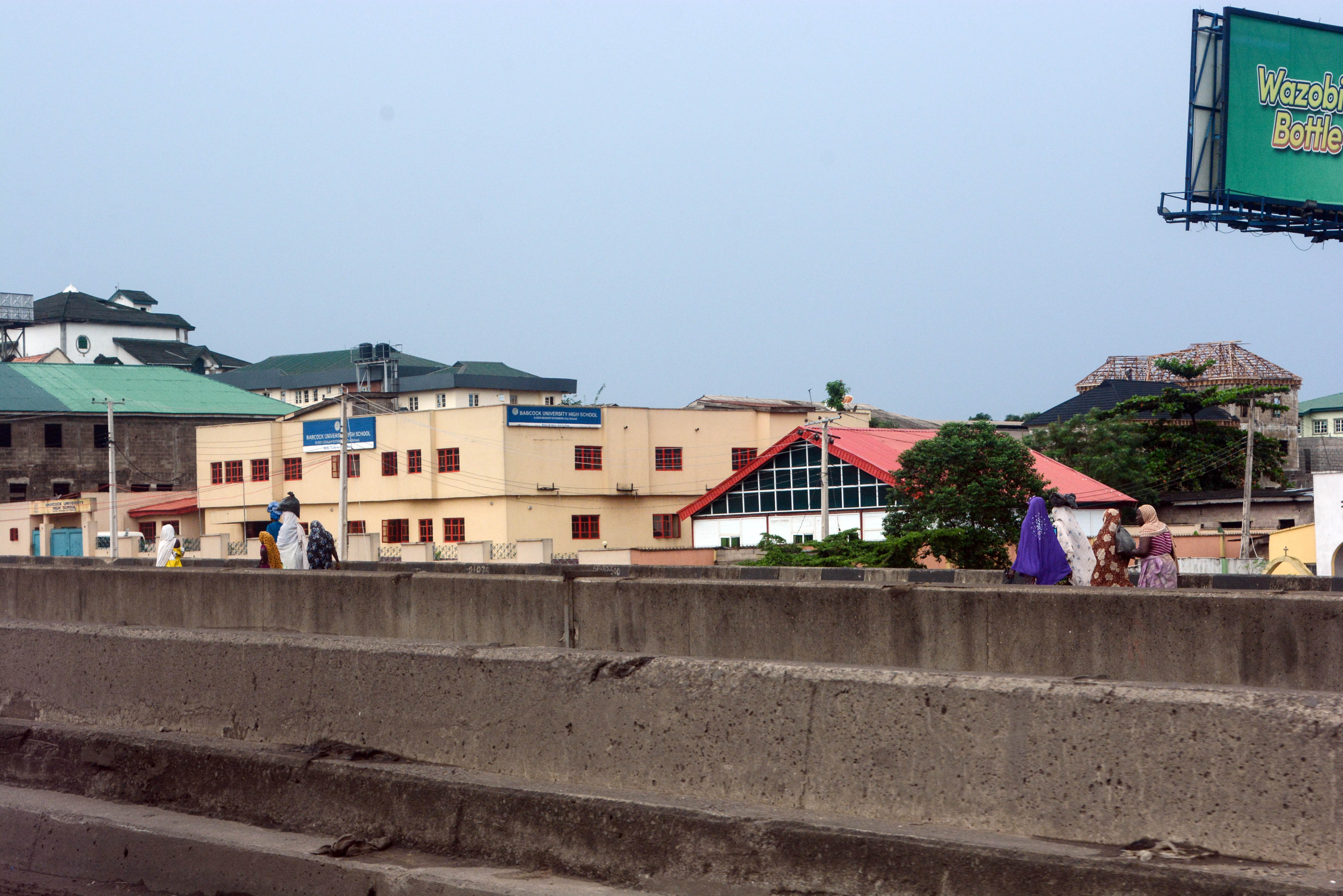
Rehabilitation of road

== See also ==
- Otedola bridge fire accident
