= One Week One Trouble =

1972 novel by Anezi Okoro

- Author: Anezi Okoro
- Illustrator: Charles Ohu
- Language: English
- Series: African Readers Library
- Release number: 21
- Genre: Fiction
- Publisher: African University Press
- Publication date: 1972
- Publication place: Nigeria
- Media type: Print (Paperback)
- Pages: 117
- ISBN: 9780410801527
- OCLC: 1845124

One Week One Trouble is a 1972 young adult/children novel by Nigerian writer Anezi Okoro. The title of the book has been used by a journalist to describe "trouble" befalling Nigerian politicians.

== Plot summary ==
The novel focuses on Wilson Tagbo, a boy who got admission into secondary school. Starting from his first day, Wilson jumped from one trouble to another. One of Tagbo's escapades in his secondary school includes how he was sniffing around the Chemistry laboratory in his school, and inhaled nitrous oxide, which is commonly known as laughing gas, and subsequently passed out. And just like the title suggests, no week passes by without Tagbo getting in trouble until he finally joined the school cultists in his class 5, where he was finally arrested.
