= Yelwata massacre =

2025 massacre in Nigeria

The Yelwata massacre was a massacre of Christian villagers which took place between June 13 and 14, 2025 in the Nigerian village of Yelwata, Benue State. It is estimated that around 100 to 200 people were killed and about 3,000 were displaced.

== Attack ==
The attack began during the night of 13 June 2025. According to Pope Leo XIV, "the majority of those killed were internally displaced people who were being housed at a local Catholic mission."

== Aftermath ==
After the attacks, Nigerian president Bola Tinubu promised to visit the Benue region. Pope Leo XIV denounced the attacks, saying "I pray in particular for the rural Christian communities in the state of Benue, who have unceasingly been victims of violence."

The Free Press criticized mainstream news outlets for either ignoring the massacre, or reporting it without mentioning the fact that the massacre was perpetrated by Muslims against Christians.

Speaking one year after the killings, local Catholic Bishop Wilfred Chikpa Anagbe spoke about the importance of obtaining justice, and the local parish priest Fr Jonathan Ukuma said that though the faithful did want that, they understood that reconciliation was also an important part of the healing process.
