= Federal Roads Maintenance Agency (Nigeria) =

Federal Roads Maintenance Agency (FERMA) is the Federal Government of Nigeria agency concerned with road construction, improvement and connectivity between the States of Nigeria.

The agency is a subsidiary of the Federal Ministry of Work.

== See also ==
- Lagos Ibadan Expressway
