= 2025 Suleja fuel tanker explosion =

Fuel tanker explosion in Nigeria

- Date: 18 January 2025
- Time: ~9:00 a.m. (UTC Offset +01:00)
- Location: Near Suleja, Niger State, Nigeria; 9°16′21″N 7°13′03″E
- Type: Tank truck explosion
- Cause: Petrol explosion and fire
- Deaths: ≥100
- Injuries: ≥69
- Property damage: Millions of naira (estimated)

On 18 January 2025, a fuel tanker carrying roughly 60,000 litres (3,700,000 in^{3}) of petrol overturned at the Dikko junction near Suleja, Niger State, northern Nigeria, where after crashing local residents gathered to collect spilled fuel. The fuel promptly caused an explosion which killed over 100 people and injured another 69, including at least 52 critically.

== Explosion ==
The explosion took place around 9:00 a.m. WAT at the Dikko junction along the major highway connecting Nigeria's federal capital of Abuja to Kaduna. According to the Federal Road Safety Corps (FRSC) in Niger State leader Kumar Tsukwam, the incident began when a tanker truck carrying gasoline overturned, spilling its contents. Local residents including children who had gathered to collect the spilled fuel were caught in the subsequent explosion, which caused another tanker to explode. The Niger State Emergency Management Agency (NSEMA) reported that the explosion occurred when spilled petrol contacted a generator being used to facilitate the fuel transfer process. The explosion burned and destroyed at least 20 nearby shops.

== Victims ==
The Federal Road Safety Corps confirmed that over 100 bodies of residents were recovered from the scene and buried, with most victims burned beyond recognition. About 69 injured people were rushed to various nearby hospitals to receive urgent medical attention. Many of the victims were reportedly attempting to collect spilled fuel from the tanker at the time of the explosion. Governor of Niger State Umaru Bago reported that an undisclosed number of additional victims suffered various degrees of burns. The explosion and subsequent fire caused extensive property damage, with losses estimated in the millions of naira.

== Reactions ==
Bago described the disaster as "worrisome, heartbreaking, and unfortunate". The Nigeria Governors' Forum gave its condolences to the victims' families, offered prayers for those killed in the disaster, and urged all Nigerians to behave "with extreme caution and absolute respect for life at all times" in similarly dangerous situations.

Nigeria's first lady Remi Tinubu donated ₦100 million (US$70,000) and other expenses including food to families of the victims.

The Niger State Emergency Management Agency, under Director General Abdullahi Baba-Arah, conducted initial investigations into the cause of the explosion.

== See also ==
- 2024 Majiya fuel tanker explosion
- Ibadan petrol tanker explosion
- Otedola bridge fire accident
