= Odigbo =

- LGA
- Interactive map of Odigbo
- Country: Nigeria
- State: Ondo State
- Headquarter: Ore

Area
  - Total: 1,818 km^{2} (702 sq mi)

Population (2020)
  - Total: 600,000
  - Density: 330/km^{2} (850/sq mi)
- Time zone: UTC+1 (WAT)
- Postal code: 350

Odigbo is a Local Government Area in Ondo State, Nigeria. Its headquarters are in the town of Ore.

It has an area of 1,818 km^{2} (702 sq mi) and a population of 230,351 at the 2006 census. The current census as of 2020 is over 600,000 as Ore Town continue to attract new inhabitants from every part of the country. The people of Odigbo local government are from the Ondo lineage and the Furupagha-Ijaws that constituted the Ebijaw ward. These people include The Odigbos, Ayesan, Araromi Obus and Ajue who largely observe similar customs and uphold the same traditional as other Ondos while the Ijaws are the Eluju-Iyaradina, Ebijaw, Ebijaw Zion, Taribor, Gbunuwei, Ukuregbene, Abadigbene. The people of odigbo local government speak a local dialect close to the ondos. These people cover the towns and the villages of Ore town, Agbabu, Lafe, Modebiayo, Isheba, Oke-Oluwa, Ayetedo, Ago Alaye, Ajebamidele, Ajebambo, Kajola, Ayesan, Oniparaga, Imorun, Laleipa, Okefara, Ayetoro, Sidigi, Oke-Ojakoparun, Lokuta, Araromi-Ayesan oil palm estate, Basola, Agirifon, Adewinle, Aiyetimbo, Koseru, Omowole, Onipetesi, Mile 49, Labon, Akinseye, Temidire, Sokoto, Bolorunduro, Fesojoye, Oduduwa village, Ajibodu. The odigbo local government people share boundary with the Ondos in the north, the Ikales in the east, the Ijebus of Ogun State in the south and Osun State in the west.

Several villages in Odigbo local government are inhabited by non-indigenes like people from Oyo and Osun States as well as the Ikale people of Irele and Okitipupa local government areas of Ondo state. The biggest town of Odigbo local Government is Ore Town, this town is a major nodal town on one of the busiest highways in the country, the Shagamu-Ore-Benin Expressway. The Local Government Office is situated in Ore. People from every part of the country live in Ore Town due to its nodal and commercial nature.

The postal code of the area is 350.

== History ==
Odigbo local government has two major kingdoms; Odigbo kingdom and Araromi-Obu kingdom. The paramount ruler of Odigbo kingdom is HRM the Orunja of Odigbo while the paramount ruler of Araromi-Obu kingdom is the HRM, the Ajobu of Araromi-Obu. The Major towns in Odigbo local government are Araromi-Obu, Odigbo, Ajue, Ore, etc. Many parts of Odigbo local government are inhabited by non-indigenes like people from Oyo and Osun States and some parts are occupied by the Ikale people of Okitipupa and Irele local government areas of Ondo State. Odigbo is the owner of the bitumen, stated in ondo state.

== Climate ==
Odigbo experiences a tropical wet-and-dry climate with heavy rainfall between April and October due to strong maritime influence. The dry season is typically warm, and temperatures show little variation throughout the year.
