= Anezi Okoro =

Nigerian academic and writer (1929–2024)

professor Anezi Okoro OON
- Born: Anezionwu Nwankwo Okoro; 17 May 1929; Arondizuogu, Colony and Protectorate of Nigeria
- Died: 20 January 2024 (aged 94); Enugu, Enugu State, Nigeria
- Citizenship: Nigerian
- Occupations: Academic; Writer; Dermatologist
- Notable work: One Week One Trouble

Anezionwu Nwankwo "Anezi" Okoro (17 May 1929 – 20 January 2024) was a Nigerian writer and medical practitioner. He was best known for his 1972 novel One Week One Trouble.

== Life and career ==
Anezi Okoro was born in Arondizuogu, Imo State, Nigeria on 17 May 1929.

Okoro had his secondary school education at Methodist College, Uzuakoli, Abia State, Nigeria.

From 1957 to 1959, Okoro worked as a house surgeon, University College Hospital, Ibadan. He began his career as an academic in 1975 as a professor of medicine University of Nigeria, Nsukka. He was the president of the African Association for Dermatology from 1986 to 1991. Director, Nigerian National Petroleum Corporation in Lagos from 1977 to 1981. He was a visiting professor, Medical College of Georgia, Augusta in 1987, and University of Minnesota, Minneapolis, 1988, King Faisal University, Dammam Saudi Arabia as professor of dermatology from 1989 to 1995.

Okoro died on 20 January 2024 after being sick for some time. He was 94.

== Bibliography ==
- The Village School (1966)
- The Village Headmaster (1967)
- Febechi down the Niger (1971)
- Febechi in Cave Adventure (1971)
- One Week one Trouble (1973)
- Dr. Amadi's Postings (1975)
- Pictorial Handbook of Common Skin Diseases (1981)
- Education Is Great (1986)
- Double Trouble (1990)
- Pariah Earth and Other Stories (1994)
- The Second Great Flood (1999)
- New Broom at Amanzu (1963)
