= V. B. C. Onyema III =

- Eze Onyema III of Ogwu-Ikpele
- Reign: 1976–2024
- Predecessor: Eze Onyema II
- Born: Valentine Benjamin Chukwuma Onyema; 13 February 1927; Ogwu-Ikpele, Colony and Protectorate of Nigeria
- Died: February/March 2024 (aged 97)
- Spouse: Rebecca Nwanyiesigo Nnubia, Odobo of Ogwu-Ikpele
- Issue: Roseline O. Ezuma, Margaret N. Orakwusi, Kenneth O. Onyema, Dominic Emeka Onyema, Catherine N. Emuchay, Emilia N. Onyema, Oscar N. Onyema, and Wilfred Chukwuma Onyema
- Father: Eze Onyema II, Traditional ruler of Ogwu-Ikpele

Eze V. B. C. Onyema III (13 February 1927 – February/March 2024) was a Nigerian traditional ruler of Ogwu-Ikpele in Ogbaru Local Government Area of Anambra State, South Eastern from 1976 until his death in 2024. He was the successor to his father, Eze Onyema II, and one of three Patrons of the Anambra State Council of Traditional Rulers.

== Background ==
Born in Ogwu-Ikpele, Eze Onyema III was an executive of G.B. Ollivant, a subsidiary of the United Africa Company (UAC) of Nigeria, rising from the rank of clerk in 1943 to become the first Nigerian General Manager of the company (Divisional CEO) in 1977. Prior to joining UAC, he was educated in Oguta and Onitsha, and even had a teaching stint in Onitsha. Young Eze Onyema III manned various managerial roles, moving between Port-Harcourt and countless other towns in Eastern Nigeria with his family prior to the civil war.

In 1948, he had met and married Rebecca Nwanyiesigo Nnubia Okwuosa Onumonu, following a relentless bout of wooing spearheaded by his father Eze Onyema II and other family members.

Following the outbreak of the Nigerian Civil War in 1967, Onyema returned to Ogwu-Ikpele, where he stayed with his family until the end of the war. In 1970, Onyema moved to Onitsha and subsequently to Lagos, where he held several senior positions before his appointment as general manager of G.B. Ollivant.

== Reign ==
In 1976, Onyema III was nominated and installed as the Eze of Ogwu-Ikpele. He accepted the call to ascend the throne of his fathers upon the condition that he complete his service with G.B. Ollivant as he was due for retirement by 1982. In this time, he appointed another member of the Eze Onyema family to represent him in relations with Olinzele chiefs of his cabinet (The King's cabinet of chiefs) and appeared only when his presence was absolutely needed.

Post retirement, he took full control and responsibilities for his traditional stool. In service to his people, Eze Onyema III was over the years a member and patron of various cultural institutions, associations, special committees, social clubs, and delegations.

In early March 2024, it was reported that Onyema III had died. He was 97.
