= Yahaya Ibrahim Masussuka =

Nigerian Islamic preacher and religious teacher (1979–2026)

- Born: Yahaya Ibrahim Masussuka; 1979; Biyawa, Batsari, Katsina State, Nigeria
- Died: 26 October 2026 (aged 47); Dutsin-Ma, Katsina State, Nigeria
- Burial place: Katsina
- Citizenship: Nigeria
- Education: Arabic Teachers College, Katsina; Islamic studies in Egypt and Oman
- Occupations: Islamic preacher; Religious teacher
- Known for: Qur'an-centred teachings and interfaith advocacy
- Movement: Qur'aniyya

Yahaya Ibrahim Masussuka (1979 – 26 October 2026) was a Nigerian Islamic preacher and religious teacher from Katsina State. He was known for his Qur'an centred teachings and his views on Islamic religious practices. He also advocated peaceful coexistence and dialogue between Muslims and Christians.

== Early life and education ==
Masussuka was born in 1979 in Biyawa village, in Batsari Local Government Area of Katsina State. He spent part of his childhood in Masussuka, Ningi Local Government Area of Bauchi State, where he began his Qur'anic education.

He later returned to Katsina to continue his Islamic studies. He attended the Arabic Teachers College in Katsina and studied under Islamic scholars, including Malam Zakariya in Sabuwar Unguwa. He also pursued further Islamic studies in Egypt and Oman.

== Religious activities ==
Masussuka began preaching at an early age and became known for his religious teachings based mainly on the Quran. He was associated with the Qur'aniyya movement, which emphasises the Qur'an as the primary source of religious guidance.

His views on the role and authority of hadith in Islam differed from those of many traditional Islamic scholars. He questioned the authenticity and interpretation of some hadith, which brought him into disagreement with other religious leaders. His sermons and lectures circulated widely on social media and attracted followers as well as critics.

In April 2024, he established Qur'an TV/Radio and Masussuka International School in Dutsin-Ma, Katsina State. The institution combined Islamic and conventional education.

== Interfaith activities ==
Masussuka was known for promoting peaceful relations between Muslims and Christians. He spoke about religious tolerance and encouraged people of different faiths to live together peacefully.

In June 2025, he received a Peace Ambassador Award from the Network for Good Governance and Transparency in recognition of his efforts to promote peace. He was also planning a peace gathering in Dutsin-Ma before his death to encourage understanding among religious communities.

== Death ==
On 26 October 2026, Masussuka was shot by gunmen outside his residence in Dutsin-Ma, Katsina State. His associate, Adamu Abubakar, was also killed in the attack. Both men were taken to a hospital, where they were confirmed dead.

His death was condemned by religious leaders, government officials, and members of the public. The killing attracted national attention, and calls were made for an investigation into the circumstances surrounding the attack.

Masussuka was buried in Katsina following funeral prayers attended by mourners from different parts of Nigeria and neighbouring countries.
