= 2026 Nigerian Air Force ATR 42 crash =

2026 military aviation accident in Nigeria

- NAF931, the aircraft involved in the accident, pictured in 2024

Accident
- Date: 5 October 2026
- Summary: Crashed en route, under investigation
- Site: Near Igbokoda, Ondo State, Nigeria

Aircraft
- Aircraft type: ATR 42–500 (512MP Surveyor)
- Operator: Nigerian Air Force
- Registration: NAF931
- Flight origin: Benin Airport, Edo State, Nigeria
- Destination: Murtala Muhammed International Airport, Lagos State, Nigeria
- Occupants: 25
- Passengers: 20
- Crew: 5
- Fatalities: 25
- Survivors: 0

On 5 October 2026, an ATR 42 operated by the 81st Air Maritime Group of the Nigerian Air Force crashed near Igbokoda, Ondo State, Nigeria, during a routine domestic flight from Benin Airport, Edo State, to Murtala Muhammed International Airport, Lagos State. All 25 people on board were killed. The crash is the deadliest in Nigeria since the 2012 crash of Dana Air Flight 0992.

== Background ==
=== Aircraft ===
The aircraft involved was an 18 year-old ATR 42–500 with twin turboprop engines. The aircraft was registered as NAF 931; one of two ATR-42 500 operated by the Nigerian Air Force 81st Air Maritime Group based in Benin City. It was procured in March 2010 from Alenia Aeronautica and was configured for intelligence, surveillance and reconnaissance (ISR) activities and maritime patrol. In 2022, it was sent to the Rheinland Air Service facility in Monchengladbach, Germany, for a major maintenance and upgrade. The aircraft has previously been deployed in counter-terrorism operations against Boko Haram in northeastern Nigeria.

=== Occupants ===
The aircraft was carrying 25 people, five crew members and 20 passengers. 19 of the occupants were military personnel.

== Accident ==
The aircraft crashed near a naval base in Igbokoda while en route to Lagos. The aircraft lost radar contact with air traffic controllers at 9:13 local time. Residents reported hearing a very loud explosion. Local residents reported seeing the aircraft enter a dive, before impacting trees and crashing into the water. The plane was completely destroyed on impact, and the wreckage later sunk.

== Search and rescue ==
As of 5 October, search and rescue operations are still ongoing, with the wreckage having been located. The operations are made more difficult by the swamp present in the area, with rescuers forced to reach the crash site by canoe. Ondo State Governor Lucky Aiyedatiwa said that no sign of survivors has been found yet. Initially 32 fatalities were being reported, but the death toll was later lowered to 25 as the Nigerian Air Force released more information. A day after the crash, on October 6, an amphibious excavator was deployed to the accident site to assist with recovery operations. Sonar equipment was also deployed to scan the riverbed at the crash site. On October 9 the Nigerian Air Force commenced operations to recover the aircraft flight recorders. The flight recorders were recovered on November 6, alongside with engine parts. They will be analysed by investigative authorities.

== Reactions ==
Nigerian president Bola Tinubu expressed his condolences to the families of the victims and stated that the Nigerian Air Force will start an investigation into the accident. He also declared three days of national mourning with flags at half-mast across the country.

In the week following the accident the Senate of Nigeria called for an audit over the country's air force and its equipment, to determine if undermaintanace and other problems are present.

== Investigation ==
The Nigerian Air Force later established a special board, made up of twelve members, to investigate the crash.
