= Tony Ekubia =

Nigerian/British boxer (1960–2024)

Personal information
- Nationality: Nigerian, British
- Born: 6 March 1960 Federation of Nigeria
- Died: 17 May 2024 (aged 64) Greater Manchester, England
- Height: 5 ft 8 in (1.73 m)
- Weight: Light, light welter, welterweight

Boxing career

Boxing record
- Total fights: 25
- Wins: 21 (KO 17)
- Losses: 4 (KO 2)

Tony Ekubia (6 March 1960 – 17 May 2024) was a Nigerian-British professional light, light welter and welterweight boxer of the 1980s and 1990s who won the British Boxing Board of Control (BBBofC) Central (England) Area lightweight title, BBBofC British light welterweight title, and Commonwealth light welterweight title, his professional fighting weight varied from 134 3/4 lb (61.1 kg; 9 st 8.8 lb), i.e. lightweight to 146 lb (66 kg; 10 st 6 lb), i.e. welterweight.

He died on 17 May 2024, at his home in Greater Manchester.
