= A124 highway (Nigeria) =

Road in Nigeria

Coordinates: 9.031493°N 6.412067°E

Trunk Road A124

Route information
- Length: 51.8 km (32.2 mi)

Location
- Country: Nigeria

Highway system
- Transport in Nigeria

The A124 highway is a highway in Nigeria. It is 51.8 kilometres (32.2 mi) in length. It is one of the east-west roads linking the main south-north roads. (It is named from the two highways it links).

It runs from the A1 highway north of Mokwa, Niger State to the A2 highway at Madalla near Abuja.
