= Gurokayeya massacres =

2023 Boko Haram attacks in Nigeria

- Part of the Boko Haram insurgency
- Location: Gurokayeya, Yobe State, Nigeria
- Date: 30–31 October 2023
- Deaths: 37–40+
- Injuries: 7
- Perpetrator: ISWAP

Between 30 and 31 October 2023, two attacks perpetrated by Boko Haram killed at least 40 people. In the first attack, which took place on 30 October, Boko Haram militants shot up villagers who did not pay their taxes, killing at seventeen. The following day, a convoy of mourners hit a Boko Haram-placed landmine on the way to the funeral for the prior day's victims.

== Background ==
Boko Haram emerged in 2009 as a jihadist social and political movement in a failed rebellion in northeast Nigeria. Throughout the following years, Abubakar Shekau unified militant Islamist groups in the region and continued to foment the rebellion against the Nigerian government, conducting terrorist attacks and bombings in cities and communities across the region. On 7 March 2015, the group publicly declared allegiance to the Islamic State and became known as the Islamic State – West Africa Province (ISWAP).

== Massacres ==
=== First attack ===
On 30 October, militants raided the village of Gurokayeya on motorbikes at around 10:30pm local time (19:30 GMT) and began rounding up men in the village. About 21 people, all men between the ages of 20 and 30, were rounded up by the gunmen and shot. Seventeen of the victims died immediately, while the remaining four were rushed to the hospital. The victims were selected for not paying taxes to ISWAP, and before the group left they reiterated another warning to the villagers to pay their taxes. The ISWAP fighters also accused the villagers of passing on information about ISWAP hideouts to the Nigerian Army.

=== Second attack ===
The very next day, residents of Gurokayeya held a funeral for the previous day's victims. A member of an anti-jihadist militia stated that, “There were fears the terrorists could return and disrupt the funeral, but the people insisted on burying the dead.” As a vehicle carrying 22 men from the neighboring village of Karabiri was returning from the funeral, it hit a landmine placed by ISWAP, killing at least 20 people. Two others were severely injured in the vehicle bombing, and were transported to Damaturu. A local official said at least 40 people were killed across both attacks.

== Aftermath ==
The massacres were some of the deadliest in Yobe State in years. No group claimed responsibility for the massacres, but the Islamic State - West Africa Province was suspected.
