= 2024 Gwoza bombings =

Series of suicide bombings in Nigeria

- Location: Gwoza, Borno State, Nigeria
- Date: 29 June 2024; 3:00 pm (GMT+1)
- Attack type: Suicide bombing
- Deaths: 32
- Injuries: 48
- Perpetrator: Unknown
- No. of participants: 3+

On 29 June 2024, at least three bomb blasts targeted several areas in Gwoza, Borno State, in northeastern Nigeria, killing 32 people and injuring 48. The first blast struck a wedding ceremony at 3:00 p.m. local time, followed by another at General Hospital Gwoza before a third bombing struck a funeral. State emergency management officials blamed suicide bombers. The perpetrators are unknown as of July 13, 2024, but the BBC has noted that Islamic State – West Africa Province has claimed responsibility for other recent bombings in Borno.

== Background ==
In 2014, Boko Haram militants seized the city of Gwoza before it was taken back by Nigerian forces in 2015, with Boko Haram continuing to launch attacks and carry out kidnappings near the town.

== Bombings ==
At around 3:40 p.m. GMT+1, a female detonated an improvised explosive device at a crowded motor park near a three-way intersection following a wedding ceremony in the town of Gwoza, resulting in six deaths and multiple injuries. A police spokesperson reported that the suicide bomber was carrying a baby, who was also killed in the blast.

A second suicide bomber targeted General Hospital Gwoza, while a third bomber targeted a funeral of the first attack's victims while pretending to be a mourner, killing at least one person and injuring sixteen more. The Nigerian military imposed a curfew following the attacks. Borno State Emergency Management Agency Director General Dr. Barkindo Muhammad Saidu visited the site of the blasts in Gwoza Town. He said the dead include men, children and pregnant women, and 19 seriously injured victims were taken to Borno State capital, Maiduguri. Two of the injured died in hospital.

A member of a militia assisting the Nigerian military in Gwoza claimed that a separate bombing at a security post killed two of his men and a Nigerian soldier.
