= Zurak =

Zurak زورك
- Village
- Location within Iran
- Coordinates: 29°19′38″N 57°10′13″E
- Country: Iran
- Province: Kerman
- County: Jiroft
- Bakhsh: Sarduiyeh
- Rural District: Dalfard

Population (2006)
  - Total: 48
- Time zone: UTC+3:30 (IRST)
  - Summer (DST): UTC+4:30 (IRDT)

Zurak (Persian: زورك, also Romanized as Zūrak and Zoorak; also known as Zang and Zonk) is a village in Dalfard Rural District, Sarduiyeh District, Jiroft County, Kerman Province, Iran. At the 2006 census, the village had a population of 48 people, comprising six families.
