= Oyo school kidnappings =

Kidnapping of school children in Oyo, Nigeria

- Date: 15 May 2026
- Location: Oriire Local Government Area, Oyo State, Nigeria
- Type: Kidnapping, hostage-taking, murder
- Motive: Ransom, release of imprisoned militants, demand for Sharia law
- Perpetrators: Unknown armed group (suspected bandits; demands linked to Ansaru commanders)
- Outcome: Rescue of all victims, arrest of eight perpetrators, and neutralization of others
- Deaths: 3 (including one teacher beheaded in captivity)
- Missing: 49
- Inquiries: Joint security operation by Nigerian Army, Police, and vigilantes

On 15 May 2026, armed men attacked three schools in Oriire Local Government Area of Oyo State, Nigeria, and abducted 49 pupils, teachers, and a toddler. The attack, which also resulted in the killing of a mathematics teacher in captivity, drew nationwide outrage, led to an indefinite teachers’ strike, and prompted both state and federal authorities to deploy extensive rescue operations.

== Background ==
Mass school abductions have been a recurring security crisis in Nigeria since the 2014 Chibok kidnapping by Boko Haram, which saw 276 schoolgirls taken from a secondary school in Borno State. While such incidents have historically been concentrated in the north of the country, the 2026 Oyo attack marked a rare expansion of high‑profile school raids into the South‑West, a region previously considered relatively secure. The incident occurred less than a year after several mass school kidnappings, including the abduction of around 100 children from a Catholic school in Niger State in late 2025 and the kidnapping of 25 girls from Government Girls Comprehensive Secondary School in Kebbi State. According to an editorial in Leadership, between 1,600 and 1,700 schoolchildren had been abducted directly from Nigerian schools since 2014, with over 180 killed and nearly 90 injured as of 2026.

== Attack ==
On the morning of 15 May 2026, a large group of heavily armed men riding motorcycles simultaneously raided three schools in the communities of Yawota and Ahoro‑Esinele taking children from Baptist Nursery and Primary School, Yawota, Community High School, Ahoro‑Esinele；and L.A. Primary School, Ahoro‑Esinele. The assailants arrived during school hours, firing shots before storming the classrooms. A teacher told the BBC that the children were already seated when the attack began, and the gunmen seized them without resistance. The kidnappers abducted children as young as two years old, along with teachers and a toddler who was with one of the abducted educators. During the operation, two people were killed: an adult shot after being mistaken for a pursuer, and a teacher killed on the spot.

== Victims ==
Official counts of the victims varied in the days after the attack. The senator representing Oyo North, Abdulfatai Buhari, stated that 49 persons comprising schoolchildren, teachers and a toddler were taken. Governor Seyi Makinde initially reported that seven students were abducted from Community Grammar School, while 18 children and seven teachers were taken from First Baptist Primary and Nursery School. Elisha Olukayode Ogundiya, chairman of the Christian Association of Nigeria in Oyo State, confirmed that 46 people, “mostly children aged between two and 16 years, were taken away”.

On 17 May 2026, the kidnappers released a video showing the beheading of a mathematics teacher, Michael Oyedokun, who had been abducted from one of the schools. The video, widely circulated on social media, triggered intense national outrage.

== Investigation and rescue efforts ==
Immediately after the attack, a joint rescue operation involving Nigerian army personnel, police officers, and local vigilantes was launched. However, security forces encountered improvised explosive devices (landmines) planted by the kidnappers, wounding several operatives and slowing the pursuit.

Within days, the Inspector‑General of Police deployed specialised tactical and intelligence teams to Ori ire Local Government Area. By early June, surveillance helicopters of the police and military had narrowed down the forest location where the victims were believed to be held, but authorities remained cautious about launching a direct assault due to the large number of young children among the hostages. Security sources later told The Punch that the abductors had demanded the release of high‑profile Ansaru commanders, Mahmud Muhammad Usman and his deputy Mahmud al‑Nigeri, as a condition for freeing the captives. Officials said the deadlock over this demand was the primary reason rescue efforts had stalled. A presidency source added that the Oyo attack had been coordinated with a simultaneous school abduction in Borno State to maximize bargaining pressure on the government.

== Protests and teachers’ strike ==
The Nigeria Union of Teachers (NUT) declared an indefinite strike effective 1 June 2026, demanding the immediate and safe release of the abducted pupils and teachers. Public primary and secondary schools across Oyo State were shut in compliance with the union directive. On 2 June, hundreds of teachers staged a solidarity rally in Ikeja, Lagos, carrying placards reading “End the religion of fear in our schools” and “Let teachers teach in peace”. Similar protests were held in Oyo and Ogun States, where civil society groups and residents also called for stronger security measures.

=== Rejection of palliatives and community reaction ===
During the federal delegation’s visit on 31 May, officials brought rice and cash donations for the affected families. In an emotional confrontation, the women of Yawota rejected the items, shouting “We don’t want money. It is our children we want”. The Baale of Yawota later explained that the parents had delivered a clear message: no amount of relief could replace the safe return of their loved ones. The incident drew widespread criticism on social media, with many Nigerians accusing the government of responding to national tragedies with palliatives instead of sustainable solutions.

== Demands of the kidnappers ==
On 5 June 2026, the Leadership and AllAfrica news platform reported that the kidnappers had escalated their demands, now requiring a ransom of ₦1 billion (approximately US$1.2 million) to be paid into a Republic of Benin bank account, two Hilux vehicles, and the release of suspected associates held in Oyo. More significantly, they were also demanding the implementation of Sharia law in Oyo State as a condition for freeing the captives. The Oyo State House of Assembly rejected any negotiations with the abductors, insisting instead on intensified rescue operations.

== Aftermath ==
As of early June 2026, the victims remained in captivity. The difficult forest terrain, the presence of young children among the hostages, and the abductors’ demand for the release of high‑profile Ansaru commanders continued to hamper security efforts. The United Nations Resident and Humanitarian Coordinator in Nigeria, Mohamed Malick Fall, called on 4 June 2026 for the immediate and safe release of the abducted persons, describing the incident as a grave threat to education and child protection in the country.

On 10 July, president Bola Tinubu's spokesman announced that all the kidnapped pupils and teachers have been rescued. Eight of abductors have been arrested.
