= Otedola bridge fire accident =

2018 vehicle explosion in Nigeria

The Otedola Bridge fire accident occurred on the Otedola Bridge at the Lagos end of the Lagos-Ibadan Expressway where a tanker lorry fully loaded with petroleum product fell, leaked and exploded on 28 June 2018.

The massive fire at the Lagos–Ibadan Expressway broke out after the explosion of a petroleum filled tanker lorry leading to the transfer of flames to other vehicles approaching the lorry on the busy road.

The Nigerian Federal Road Safety Corps tweeted that night, "A total of nine persons have been confirmed dead as a result of the incident." The Lagos State Government reported that the number had risen to 12 on July 2.

The Federal Road Safety Corps announced that at least 54 vehicles were burnt with the tanker. A number of eyewitnesses, nearby residents and public figures believe that the reports on the economic loss and casualties are distorted by government and media.
