= Benin–Ore–Sagamu Expressway =

Expressway in Nigeria

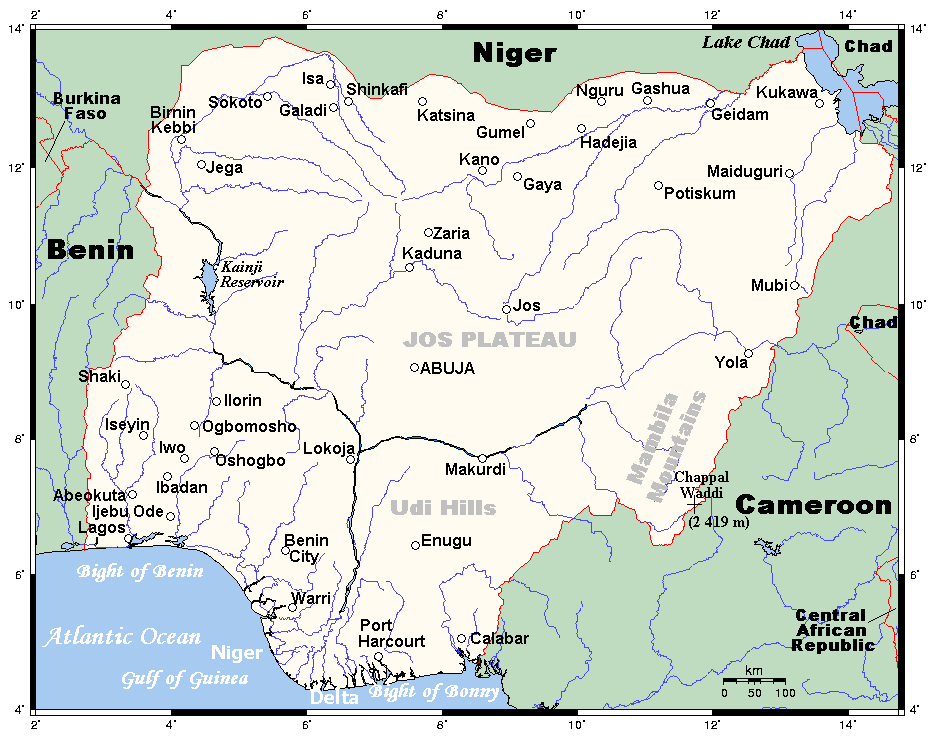

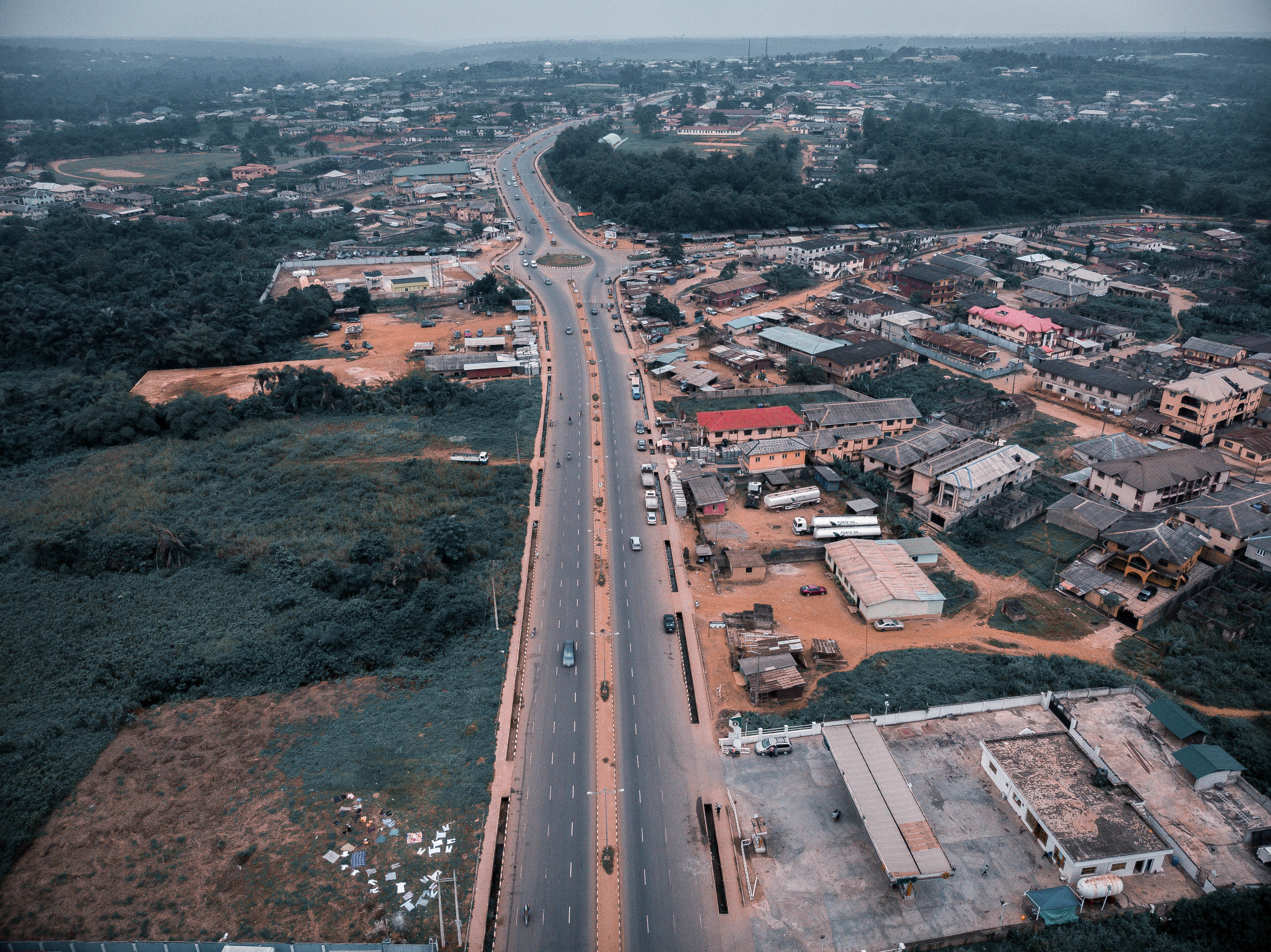
- Area View, Benin-Sagamu Expressway

Route information
- History: Completed in 1963

Major junctions
- South end: Benin City
- Ore, Sagamu
- West end: Lagos

Location
- Country: Nigeria
- States: Edo, Ondo, Ogun, Lagos
- Major cities: Benin City, Lagos

Highway system
- Transport in Nigeria

Benin–Ore–Sagamu Expressway is a 492 kilometres (306 mi) stretch dual-lane connecting Benin City to Ore town in Ondo State and Sagamu in Ogun State. It is a major route from the Southern part of the country to the Southwestern, and Northern parts of Nigeria through the Benin–Auchi axis.

== Construction ==
The Benin to Lagos highway was the first conceived and constructed Federal Trunk A road between 1962 and 1963 in Nigeria. It was later awarded to Dumez Construction Company at the cost of 229.5 million naira for reconstruction and dualization and was commissioned in 1981.

=== Technical Analysis ===
- 2 x dual lanes expressway – 2 x 262
- 20,000,000 m^{3} (710,000,000 cu ft) of earthworks,
- 4,000,000 m^{2} (43,000,000 sq ft) of crushed rock and soil cement
- base, hot rolled asphalt pavement,
- 10,000 m^{2} (110,000 sq ft) of bridge decking (dual 24′ wide carriageway) concrete median barrier

Sagamu-Benin Expressway is part of the Lagos-Mombasa, as well as Algiers-Lagos sections of the Trans-Africa Highway, and Nigeria's East–West Road, making it one of the most important road networks in Nigeria.
