= Ekene Abubakar Adams =

Nigerian politician (1985–2024)

Federal Representative
- Constituency: Chikun/Kajuru

Personal details
- Born: 16 April 1985
- Died: 16 July 2024 (aged 39)
- Party: Labour Party (Nigeria)
- Occupation: Politician

Ekene Abubakar Adams (16 April 1985 – 16 July 2024) was a Nigerian politician from the Labour Party. Adams was born on 16 April 1985. Until his death on 16 July 2024 he was a member of the House of Representatives for the Chikun/Kajuru Federal Constituency of Kaduna State.

== Early football career and administration ==
Before entering politics, Ekene Abubakar Adams was involved in football as a player and administrator. He served as the general manager of Kada City Football Club in Kaduna State and later held the same position at Remo Stars in Ogun State. His experience in football administration preceded his entry into the House of Representatives.

== Political career ==
Adams contested the 2023 Nigerian general election on the platform of the Labour Party and was elected to represent the Chikun/Kajuru Federal Constituency of Kaduna State in the House of Representatives. During the 10th National Assembly, he served as chairman of the House Committee on Sports. His previous experience in football administration was frequently referenced in reports about his appointment to the position.

As chairman of the House Committee on Sports, Adams participated in discussions concerning the administration and funding of sports in Nigeria. In May 2024, he was involved in a public disagreement with the Minister of Sports Development over the management and oversight of funds allocated to the sports sector.

== Death ==
Ekene Abubakar Adams died on 16 July 2024 at the age of 39. At the time of his death, he was serving as the representative of the Chikun/Kajuru Federal Constituency and chairman of the House Committee on Sports. His death was followed by tributes from political figures, sports organisations and individuals within the Nigerian football community.

Following his death, the House of Representatives announced a contribution to support Nigeria's contingent to the 2024 Olympic and Paralympic Games in his honour.

== See also ==
- List of members of the House of Representatives of Nigeria, 2023–2027
