= Eid al-Adha in Nigeria =

Muslim festival in Nigeria

Eid al-Adha (also called Eid al-kabir) is a festival celebrated by Muslims in Nigeria and all over the world on the 10th day of the Hijri month of Dhu al-Hijja. It is one of two official holidays celebrated in Islam (the other is Eid al-Fitr). It honors the willingness of Ibrahim (Abraham) to sacrifice his son Ismail (Ishmael) as an act of obedience to Allah's command.

== History ==
In the south and west of the country, it is called Ileya (literally "time to go home" in yoruba; likely a reference to getting home for big family feasts), while in the north it's called Babbar Sallar ("big prayers' in hausa, salah being Arabic for prayer).

Since the introduction of Islam in Nigeria, Muslims have celebrated Eid al-Adha, which falls on the tenth day of Dhu al-Hijjah every year. It is referred to as "Eid Al-kabir", or in Hausa Babbar Sallah. Muslims in Nigeria celebrate it with ritual worship that includes going to the praying ground in the morning, slaughtering sacrifices mostly in the form of male sheep (a core activity of the day), and sharing meals with family and friends. The aim is to share happiness with other Muslims and, in some cases, non-Muslim neighbors.

== Traditions ==
=== Greetings ===
"Barka da Sallah" is a Hausa greeting that translates to "blessed Eid prayers" or "blessed Eid celebration" and is commonly heard to said to Muslims and non Muslims alike.

=== Visiting the prayer ground ===
Prominent ruler in Northern Nigeria riding horse to Eid Ground in Bauchi State between 1970-1973

Males and females of all ages visit the prayer ground to perform the Eid prayer. Most of them wear new clothes to show joy and happiness, as this is one of the year's most important days. They perform this prayer by observing two rak’ahs after the imam and then staying on the prayer ground to listen to the sermon from the imam, also attended by kings and other dignitaries. A gun is fired into the sky from the royal entourage to mark the end of the prayer.

=== Sacrifice ===
After completing the prayer and the sermon, the imam slaughters his sacrifice, often a male sheep. This sheep is present at the prayer ground before the prayer begins. After the slaughter, the Muslims return to their homes to slaughter theirs in order to draw closer to God and celebrate. Most Muslims slaughter sheep, which are very expensive in this season. A few of the affluent slaughter cows and camels.

=== Horse riding (Durbar) ===
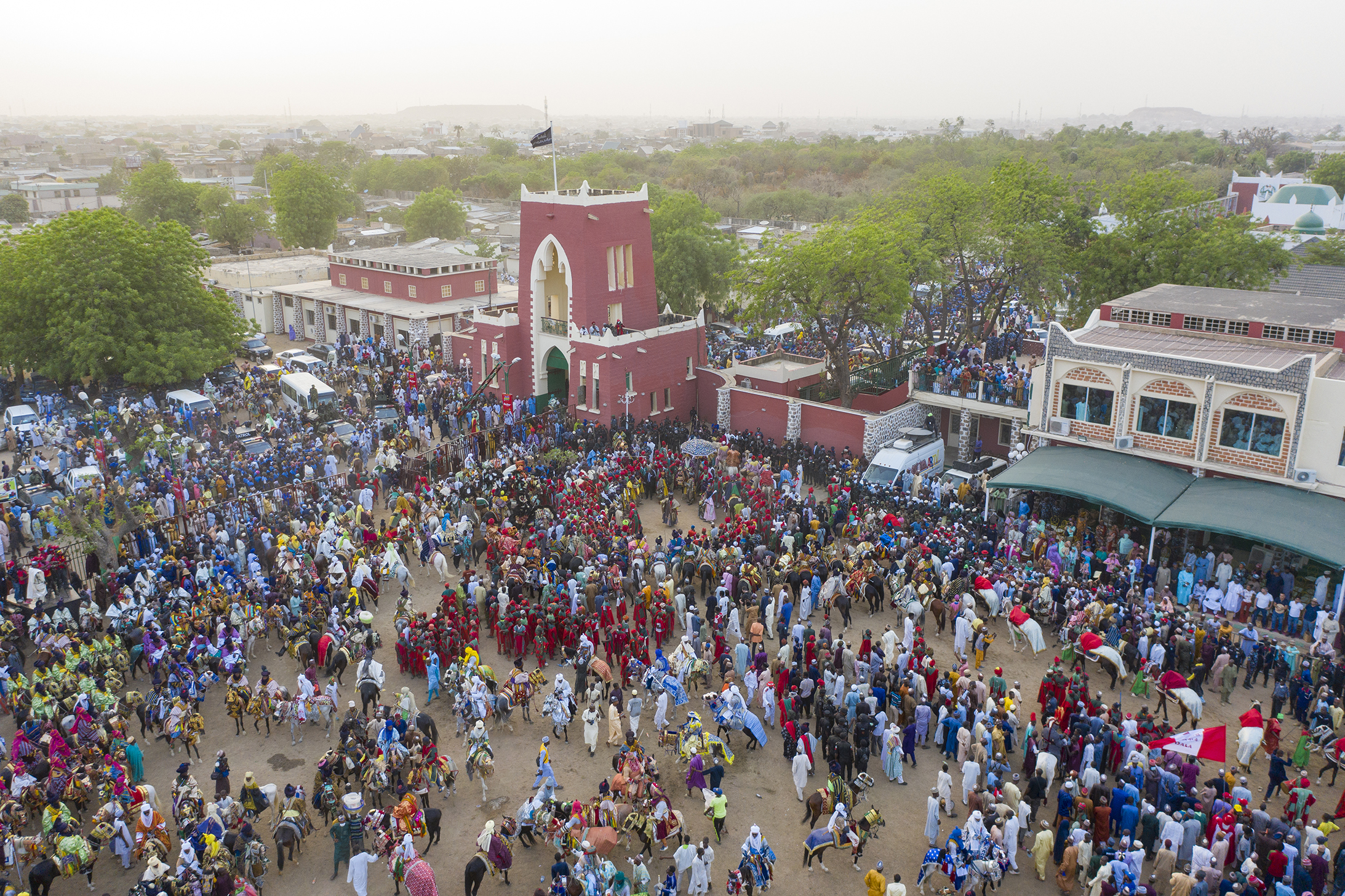
The Kano Durbar Festival 2024 is celebrated in front of the Emirs palace with the emir and his entourage riding on horses and a host of spectators watching the festivities.

After the Eid al-Adha prayer ends, the emirs and chiefs in northern Nigeria come out at the head of the crowd of worshippers and others watching the proceeding, riding adorned horses. It is also known as the Durbar festival. A horse race follows in front of the emir.

=== Sharing from the sacrifice ===
Muslims in Nigeria share the meat of their sacrifices with relatives and friends to share the joy of Eid.

=== Visitations ===
Visitation is part of the traditions. Muslims visit their friends and extended families, and gifts are presented to young ones. This act, the Muslims believe, fosters the love and harmony that Islam represents. Among the places visited during this festival are amusement parks, the beach, and other places of leisure.
