= Television in Nigeria =

Nigeria was the first country in Sub-Saharan Africa to introduce television. The first broadcast was held at the end of British colonial rule on 31 October 1959 out of Ibadan. Up until 1977, the states managed their television stations; from that year, they were absorbed into the Nigerian Television Authority. During the 1980s, new regional channels owned by the state governments appeared, and then in the 1990s, private television stations at local and national levels.

== History ==
The first television broadcast in Nigeria was held on 31 October 1959, with the launch of Western Nigeria Television (WNTV) in Ibadan, with a second transmitter at Abafon, where the station was headquartered. Eastern Nigeria Television out of Enugu followed in 1960, and in 1962, Nigerian Television Service out of Lagos and Radio Kaduna Television out of Kaduna.

Initially, the Nigerian television stations aired heavy amounts of imported content, mostly coming from the United Kingdom and the United States. Most US material consisted of crime and western series, owing to a low operating budget, creating a "crime and cowboy" image of the country. As new states were created, new stations were created, some of which being former stations that were upgraded into autonomous ones. In 1972, MidWest TV was created; whereas the first full colour television station in the country was Benue-Plateau Television (BPTV) in 1974, using the PAL format. In 1977, all television stations founded prior to this date were incorporated into the new Nigerian Television Authority. The new corporation started producing national content, Mirrors in the Sun being among the first productions; by 1979, NTA was receivable by 20% of the population.

The first station managed by a state government after the creation of NTA was Lagos Television, on VHF channel 8, in 1980, frequency awarded after a dispute with NTA2, which ended up on channel 5. Other states followed over time; the Ondo State Radiovision Corporation (OSRC) was created following the replacement of WNTV by NTA stations and the creation of autonomous state government broadcasters catering the new states; television broadcasts began in June 1982; OSRC also absorbed most former WNTV staff.

Private television began in the 1990s. Among the earliest stations was Minaj Broadcasting International (initially Minaj Systems Television) in 1994. Channels Television (now a news channel) followed in 1995 and Africa Independent Television in 1996. At the turn of the millennium, most privately-owned television stations and state government stations were TVAfrica affiliates; AIT on its behalf was an affiliate of the African Broadcast Network from 2001. Both syndication networks closed in 2003.

On 17 June 2026, the digital terrestrial television platform FreeTV made its official launch, employing the DVB-T2 standard. The service has over 100 channels and is available on both terrestrial and satellite supports. Analog switch-off is expected to end on 31 December 2028.
