= Uwazuruike =

- Gender: Male
- Language: Igbo

Origin
- Origin: Nigeria
- Region of origin: Southeast

Uwazuruike audio is a surname of Igbo origin in South eastern Nigeria. Notable people with the surname include:

- Allwell Uwazuruike, Nigerian academic
- Ralph Uwazuruike, Nigerian activist
