= Allwell =

Allwell is both a given name and a surname. Notable people with the name include:

- Allwell Uwazuruike, Nigerian academic and author
- Siene Allwell-Brown, Nigerian broadcaster
