= NTA Bauchi =

- Country: Nigeria
- Broadcast area: Bauchi State
- Headquarters: Bauchi, Nigeria

Programming
- Languages: English, Hausa

Ownership
- Owner: Nigerian Television Authority

History
- Launched: February 1977

Availability

Terrestrial
- VHF: Channel 9 (Bauchi)

NTA Bauchi is the local branch of the Nigerian Television Authority in Bauchi, capital of the state of Bauchi.

== History ==
Prior to the establishment of NTA Bauchi, the city received Benue-Plateau Television (BPTV). In February 1977, NTV Bauchi (later renamed NTA Bauchi) started broadcasting while still acting as a BPTV relay. It also led Zone E of the NTA, which also oversaw NTA Maiduguri and NTA Yola, in eastern Nigeria. Its opening coincided with the 1977 World and African Festival of the Arts and Culture, the relay initially worked with the signal coming in from Jos which relayed the output from Lagos, and from Jos, it sent the signals to Bauchi where the relayed programming aired locally. By the early 1980s, it had upgraded to its own full-time local service with a 1,000-watt transmitter.

Adamu Lawal Toro worked at the station between 1982 and 1983.
