= NTA Sokoto =

Nigerian regional television station

NTA Sokoto is a network center of the Nigerian Television Authority. As its name implies, the station covers Sokoto State, in the northwestern edge of the country.

== History ==
NTA Sokoto was established in October 1975, commencing transmission on 15 February 1976, at the initiative of the government of the Northwestern State (renamed Sokoto after the creation of new states in 1976). The station boasted the tallest television transmitter in Nigeria at the time of creation (300 meters); it broadcast on channel 5 in Sokoto, channel 3 in Jeredi and channel 9 in Gusau. In its early years, the station mostly aired imported content, but, by the early 1980s, 95% of its programming was made locally.

When the Nigerian Television Authority was established, it created six regional zones, with Sokoto leading Zone F, alongside NTA Minna and NTA Ilorin.

A fire razed its facilities on 3 December 2023.

The station held a reunion of former staff on 13 September 2025, coinciding with the fiftieth anniversary of its creation.
