= Aisha Bello =

Nigerian television journalist (1966–2023)

- Born: 1966
- Died: 10 December 2023 (aged 56–57)
- Education: Ahmadu Bello University
- Occupation: Television journalist
- Notable credit: Nigerian Television Authority

Aisha Bello Mustapha (1966 – died 10 December 2023) was a Nigerian media personality and television journalist. She worked as a correspondent for Nigeria Television Authority for over 35 years.

== Biography ==
Born in 1966 in Maiduguri, Borno State, Nigeria, Aisha Bello acquired a bachelor's degree in Mass Communication and Media Studies from Ahmadu Bello University.

Bello worked at the Nigerian Television Authority for 35 years as a journalist, television production, broadcaster, editor, the assistant director of news and later as the general manager of NTA Parliamentary, from where she retired in May 2022.

Bello died in December 2023. In a statement, President Tinubu said: "She brought news to life and will continue to be a beacon to inspire generations in the beautiful art of broadcasting."
