= Bukola Samuel-Wemimo =

Nigerian journalist

Bukola Coker (formerly Samuel-Wemimo)
- Born: Bukola Coker; May 11; Nigeria
- Citizenship: Nigerian
- Education: Bachelor of Arts in History and International Studies.
- Alma mater: Lagos State University
- Occupation: Journalist
- Employer: Channels Television

Bukola Coker (formerly Bukola Samuel-Wemimo) is a Nigerian journalist and media personality. She is a news anchor at Channels TV. Before joining Channels TV, she hosted the political TV show Fireworks at TVC News.

== Education ==
Coker attended St Mary's Private School, Lagos, for her primary education. She had her secondary education at Abeokuta Girls Grammar School, Ogun State and her tertiary education at Lagos State University, where she earned a Bachelor of Arts in History and International Studies.

== Career ==
Coker began her broadcasting career as an undergraduate at Lagos Television in 2001 and moved to TVC News in 2006. At TVC News, she doubled as a reporter and TV presenter, hosting Fireworks and Journalist Hangout. In 2021, Coker joined Channels TV as a news anchor. On December 30, 2020, she was detained by operatives of the Department of State Services.

== Award ==
In 2017, Coker won the City People Awards For Excellence as TV Presenter of the Year. In 2019, she was nominated for Television Programme Presenter of the Year at the 27th Nigeria Media Merit Award but lost to Seun Okinbaloye of Channels TV. She received a commendation award for her report "Depression and Suicide" at the 14th Wole Soyinka Award for Investigative Reporting. In 2020, she won the 15th Wole Soyinka Award for Investigative Reporting Television Category for her report "sexual abuse and how police cog the wheels of justice". In 2021, she was among 21 female journalists selected for training on identifying and reporting sexual and gender-based violence issues (SGBV) by the Wole Soyinka Centre for Investigative Journalism (WSCIJ).
