= Channel surfing =

Quickly changing through broadcast frequencies to find programming

Channel surfing (also known as channel hopping or zapping) is the practice of quickly scanning through different television channels or radio frequencies to find something interesting to watch or listen to. Modern viewers, who may have cable or satellite services beaming down dozens if not hundreds or thousands of channels, are frequently channel surfing. It is common for people to scan channels when commercial broadcasters switch from a show over to running commercials.

The term is most commonly associated with television, where the practice became common with the wide availability of the remote control. The first published use of the term is November 1986, in an article by The Wall Street Journal.

Viewers' propensity to channel surf was apparently a factor leading toward the current ATSC standard for terrestrial television, digital television in North America. An ATSC signal can be locked onto and start being decoded within about one second, while it can take several seconds to begin decoding a Digital Video Broadcasting (DVB) signal.

== Zappers ==
Zappers are, according to media scholar Henry Jenkins, people who have a casual relationship with their televisions. Zappers do not remain on one channel for long, but continually skip from show to show, stopping for only a few minutes at a time on a particular channel.

== History ==
Referred to in Henry Jenkins' book, Convergence Culture, published in 2006, describes individuals who "constantly flit across the dial—watching snippets of shows rather than sitting down for a prolonged engagement" (Jenkins 2006:75). More of a tendency than a defining characteristic, zappers can fluctuate from the habit, depending on what is on at any given time, personal feelings toward a show, amongst other variables. The concept was overstated in the 1990s when Phillip Swann "wrote in TV.com: How Television is Shaping Our Future: ‘Few viewers today can sit through an entire program without picking up the remote and checking out another channel . . . Today’s viewer needs constant gratification: If she’s not entertained or intrigued for any stretch of time, she will flip the dial'" (Jenkins 2006:75).

== Media implications ==
After Initiative Media published its magazine The Initiative declaring that loyal fans are more valuable than zappers, television networks attempted to combat the zapper by increasing the personal appeal of their television shows, converting a zapper into a loyal fan (Jenkins 2006:75). This has led to a movement to slow down the zapper. Reality television has been suggested to be this bridge from zapper to loyal fan, being "built up of 'attractions,' short, highly emotionally charged units that can be watched in or out of sequence" (Jenkins 2006:77). American Idol is one such show, as it is "designed to pull in every possible viewer and to give each a reason not to change the channel" (Jenkins 2006:77). This technique has been perfected in American Idol via the cliffhanger commercial breaks and ending, convincing viewers to "stay tuned following these messages" or watch the show the next time it airs (Jenkins 2006:77).

== Zapping TV shows ==
The format or genre was pioneered with the Italian tv show Blob, and was an instant great success. It was first broadcast on April 17, 1989, and shortly after adopted by CanalPlus in France with Le Zapping. Canal Plus will then spread the format to other EU countries.

=== France ===
- Le Zapping (from January 1989 to July 2016)
- Le Grand zapping de l'humour
- Toutes les télés du monde
- Le Zapping de Tele7
- Vu (Since January 2017)

=== Germany ===
- Premiere Zapping (from 1993 to 2006)

=== Italy ===
- Blob (Since April 1989)

=== Poland ===
- Łapu Capu

=== Spain ===
- Alguna Pregunta Més?
- Top Trending Tele

== See also ==
- Scanner (radio)
