= Bimbo Oloyede =

- Born: Nigeria
- Citizenship: Nigerian
- Education: Drama and theatre arts
- Alma mater: Yaba college / University of Lagos
- Occupations: Journalist, producer, newscaster
- Employer: NTA
- Known for: Women Optimum Development Foundation, WODEF
- Father: M.E.K. Roberts

Bimbo Oloyede is a veteran Nigerian TV journalist and producer. As a newscaster, she worked on NTA Network News from 1976 to 1980.

== Biography ==
Oloyede's father was M.E.K. Roberts, a former deputy inspector general of police. She spent much of her adolescent life in England where she studied drama and theatre arts. When she returned to Nigeria, she began working as production staff of the drama department at Lagos Television Station owned by the Nigerian Broadcasting Corporation (NBC). In 1975, Oloyede began her broadcasting career with NBC/TV. When NBC was reorganized into the Nigerian Television Authority, Oloyede was nominated as a newscaster for the Nigerian Television Authority's 9 pm Network News, her first broadcast was in April 1976. She became the first female TV network newscaster in Nigeria. In 1980, she left NTA and co-founded a media company with her husband.

Oloyede is the founder of the Women Optimum Development Foundation, an NGO that raises awareness about issues concerning young girls and women. She established partnerships with international organizations such as UNFPA, UN Women, UNIC, and USAID.
