= Stober =

Stober is a surname. Notable people with the surname include:

- Cyril Stober, Nigerian journalist and newscaster
- Gerald Stober (born 1969), South African footballer
- Heidi Stober (born 1978), American operatic soprano
- Klaus Stöber (born 1961), German politician

== See also ==
- Stoeber
