= TV Around the World =

French documentary series (2005–2011)

- Toutes les télés du monde
- Genre: Documentary
- Created by: Alain Wieder; Vladimir Donn
- Narrated by: Sandy Boizard
- Opening theme: "L'inconnu" by Olivier Girardot
- Country of origin: France
- Original language: French
- No. of seasons: 7
- No. of episodes: 149 (inc. 5 specials)

Production
- Executive producer: Vladimir Donn
- Running time: 26 minutes (Note: Apart from the "If I'm a Director of World TV" and "Europe" specials as they ran for 52 minutes.)
- Production company: Point du Jour

Original release
- Network: Arte
- Release: 2 April 2005 – 3 September 2011

TV Around the World (French: Toutes les télés du monde) is a French documentary-magazine series that aired in Arte from 2 April 2005 to 3 September 2011. It explores television from various countries, regions, or minorities and how their history and culture make their programming unique and how it reflects to their communities. The series features behind-the-scenes access to some of the shows featured with interviews from those who worked in them, and talks to television experts and ordinary families who watch the medium.

== Episodes ==
The seasons are based from the information on Point du Jour International's website.

Series	Episodes	Originally released	
Series	Episodes	First released	Last released
1	14	2 April 2005	2 July 2005
2	15 (+1)	10 September 2005	29 April 2006
3	20 (+1)	7 January 2006	3 June 2006
4	33 (+1)	12 November 2005	9 June 2007
5	21	1 September 2007	20 September 2008
6	20	4 October 2008	3 October 2009
7	21 (+2)	17 October 2009	3 September 2011

Key

A cross (†) denotes that the episode aired exclusively on Arte and not distributed outside the channel.

=== Season 1 (2005) ===
No. overall	No. in season	Title	Directed by	Original release date
1	1	"Greece" (French: La télévision des Grecs)	Kevin Morris	2 April 2005
2	2	"Romania" (French: La télévision des Roumains)	Mathieu Sarfati	9 April 2005
3	3	"Lebanon" (French: La télévision des Libanais)	Amal Moghaizel	16 April 2005
4	4	"Quebec" (French: La télévision des Québécois)	Sylvie Deleule	23 April 2005
5	5	"Russia" (French: La télévision des Russes)	Vladimir Tchernine, Maxime Mardoukhaev	30 April 2005
6	6	"Sweden" (French: La télévision des Suédois)	Philippe Lafaix	7 May 2005
7	7	"Turkey" (French: La télévision des Turcs)	Ilana Navaro	14 May 2005
8	8	"Italy" (French: La télévision des Italiens)	Christophe Lancellotti	21 May 2005
9	9	"Mexico†" (French: La télévision des Mexicains)	François-Xavier Noulens	28 May 2005
10	10	"Burkina Faso" (French: La télévision des Burkinabés)	Stéphane Correa	4 June 2005
11	11	"Brazil†" (French: La télévision des Brésiliens)	Jérôme Tournier	11 June 2005
12	12	"Texas" (French: La télévision des Texans)	Roxanne Frias	18 June 2005
13	13	"Japan†" (French: La télévision des Japonais)	Pierre Caule	25 June 2005
14	14	"Iran" (French: La télévision des Iraniens)	Sonia Kronlund	2 July 2005

=== Season 2 (2005) ===
No. overall	No. in season	Title	Directed by	Original release date
15	1	"Venezuela" (French: La télévision des Vénézuéliens)	Marion Aldighieri	10 September 2005
16	–	"If I'm a Director of World TV†" (French: Si j'étais directeur de la télé du monde)	Vladimir Donn, Olivier Montoro	17 September 2005
The hour-long special highlights the first season and organises extracts in themes such as family, freedom of information, and women's roles.
17	2	"Australia†" (French: La télévision des Australiens)	Baya Bellanger, Djebrine Belleili	24 September 2005
18	3	"Morocco" (French: La télévision des Marocains)	Sylvie Deleule	1 October 2005
19	4	"Argentina" (French: La télévision des Argentins)	Fernando Díaz	8 October 2005
20	5	"Portugal" (French: La télévision des Portugais)	Véronique Berthonneau	15 October 2005
Overview of Portuguese television, featuring João Kléber's Fiel ou Infiel? on TVI which used a sexual adaptation of Our Lord's Prayer in the program.
21	6	"Hong Kong†" (French: La télévision des Hongkongais)	Mathieu Sarfati	22 October 2005
22	7	"India†" (French: La télévision des Indiens)	Robert Copland	29 October 2005
23	8	"Egypt" (French: La télévision des Egyptiens)	Tewfik Hakem	5 November 2005
24	9	"Netherlands†" (French: La télévision des Pays-Bas)	Roger Strijland	12 November 2005
25	10	"Israel" (French: La télévision des Israéliens)	Ilana Navaro	19 November 2005
26	11	"Spain" (French: La télévision des Espagnols)	Sergio Mondelo	26 November 2005
27	12	"Poland" (French: La télévision des Polonais)	Malgosha Gago	3 December 2005
28	13	"Iceland" (French: La télévision des Islandais)	Olivier Montoro	10 December 2005
29	14	"Serbia" (French: La télévision des Serbes)	Laurence Jourdan	17 December 2005
30	15	"New York†" (French: La télévision des New-Yorkais)	Rebecca Levin	24 December 2005

=== Season 3 (2006) ===
No. overall	No. in season	Title	Directed by	Original release date
31	1	"Czech Republic" (French: La télévision des Tchèques)	Jarmila Buzkova	7 January 2006
32	2	"Senegal" (French: Le télévision des Sénégalais)	Karim Miské	14 January 2006
33	3	"Cyprus" (French: La télévision des Chypriotes)	Sylvie Deleule	21 January 2006
34	4	"Thailand†" (French: La télévision des Thaïs)	Pierre Caule	28 January 2006
35	5	"Chicanos" (French: La télévision des Chicanos)	Roxanne Frias	4 February 2006
36	6	"Albania" (French: La télévision des Albanais)	Ilana Navaro	11 February 2006
37	7	"Colombia" (French: La télévision des Colombiens)	Luis Delgado	18 February 2006
38	8	"Tatarstan" (French: La télévision des Tatars)	Vladimir Tchernine	25 February 2006
39	9	"Uganda" (French: La télévision des Ougandais)	Pierre-François Didek	4 March 2006
40	10	"Pakistan" (French: La télévision des Pakistanais)	Claire Chognot, Marc Aderghal	11 March 2006
41	11	"English Canada†" (French: La télévision des Canadiens anglophones)	Kevin Morris	25 March 2006
42	12	"Algeria" (French: La télévision des Algériens)	Tewfik Hakem	1 April 2006
43	13	"Shanghai" (French: La télévision des Shanghaiens)	Stéphane Correa	8 April 2006
44	14	"Jamaica" (French: La télévision des Jamaïcains)	Hélène Lee	15 April 2006
45	15	"Finland†" (French: La télévision des Finlandais)	Raine Tiessalo, Frédéric Balland	22 April 2006
46	16	"Nigeria (Note: The Point du Jour website lists this episode as part of Season 2.)" (French: La télévision des Nigérians)	Stéphane Correa	29 April 2006
47	17	"Angola" (French: La télévision des Angolais)	Ariel de Bigault	6 May 2006
48	18	"Philippines" (French: La télévision des Philippins)	Pierre Caule, Solenn Honorine	13 May 2006
49	19	"Croatia†" (French: La télévision des Croates)	Jarmila Buzkova	20 May 2006
50	20	"Chile" (French: La télévision des Chiliens)	Fernando Díaz	27 May 2006
51	–	"Football†" (French: La télévision des footballeurs)	Vladimir Donn, Olivier Montoro	3 June 2006

=== Season 4 (2006–2007) ===
No. overall	No. in season	Title	Directed by	Original release date
52	1	"Norway†" (French: La télévision des Norvégiens)	Malgosha Gago	9 September 2006
53	2	"Mongolia" (French: La télévision des Mongols)	Delphine Déloge	23 September 2006
54	3	"Northern Ireland†" (French: La télévision des Irlandais du Nord)	Roxanne Frias	7 October 2006
55	4	"Uruguay" (French: La télévision des Uruguayens)	Marion Aldighieri	14 October 2006
56	5	"Basques" (French: La télévision des Basques)	Mickaël Bernard	21 October 2006
57	6	"Hungary" (French: La télévision des Hongrois)	Claire Laborey	28 October 2006
58	7	"Malaysia†" (French: La télévision des Malaisiens)	Ilana Navaro	4 November 2006
59	8	"Mormons†" (French: La télévision des Mormons)	Rebecca Levin	11 November 2006
60	9	"Kerala" (French: La télévision des Kéralais)	Karim Miské	18 November 2006
61	10	"Taiwan" (French: La télévision des Taïwanais)	Tamara Sanchez, Pierre Caule	2 December 2006
62	11	"Georgia" (French: La télévision des Géorgiens)	Vladimir Tchernine, Olivier Montoro, Paata Kourdadze	9 December 2006
63	12	"Kurdistan" (French: La télévision des Kurdes d'Irak)	Fulvia Alberti	16 December 2006
64	13	"Singapore†" (French: La télévision des Singapouriens)	Kevin Morris	23 December 2006
65	14	"Mali" (French: La télévision des Maliens)	Hélène Lee	6 January 2007
66	15	"Peru" (French: La télévision des Péruviens)	Fernando Díaz	13 January 2007
67	16	"Ukraine" (French: La télévision des Ukrainiens)	Maxime Mardoukhaev	20 January 2007
68	17	"Palestine" (French: La télévision des Palestiniens)	Nicolas Wadimoff	27 January 2007
69	18	"Indonesia" (French: La télévision des Indonésiens)	Solenn Honorine, Pierre Caule	3 February 2007
70	19	"Korea†" (French: La télévision des Coréens)	Stéphane Correa	10 February 2007
71	20	"Flanders†" (French: La télévision des Flamands)	Sylvie Deleule	17 February 2007
72	21	"Dubai" (French: La télévision des Dubaïotes)	Anne Amzallag	24 February 2007
73	22	"Estonia" (French: La télévision des Estoniens)	Claire Chognot, Marc Aderghal	3 March 2007
74	23	"Ethiopia" (French: La télévision des Ethiopien)	Anaïs Prosaïc	10 March 2007
75	24	"Ireland†" (French: La télévision des Irlandais)	Roxanne Frias	17 March 2007
76	25	"Cambodia" (French: La télévision des Cambodgiens)	Atisso Mesessou	24 March 2007
77	–	"Europe†" (French: La télévision des Européens)	Stéphane Correa, Vladimir Donn, Olivier Montoro	25 March 2007
The hour-long special highlights European television from previous episodes. It is also told with a fictional element, as it focuses on President Kirboulbachi of the fictional country of Kirbulidjestan who wants to know more of the continent by watching their television as his dream is to have his nation join the European Union.
78	26	"New Zealand†" (French: La télévision des Néo-Zélandais)	Malgosha Gago	31 March 2007
79	27	"Bulgaria" (French: La télévision des Bulgares)	Anne Morin	7 April 2007
80	28	"African Americans†" (French: La télévision des Afro-Américains)	Rebecca Levin	14 April 2007
81	29	"Tanzania" (French: La télévision des Tanzaniens)	Pierre-François Didek	21 April 2007
82	30	"Sri Lanka" (French: La télévision des Sri Lankais)	Kevin Morris	28 April 2007
83	31	"Mozambique" (French: La télévision des Mozambicains)	Aldo Lee	12 May 2007
84	32	"Kosovo" (French: La télévision des Kosovars)	Fulvia Alberti	26 May 2007
85	33	"Romandy†" (French: La télévision des Suisses romands)	Nicolas Wadimoff	9 June 2007

=== Season 5 (2007–2008) ===
No. overall	No. in season	Title	Directed by	Original release date
86	1	"Azerbaijan" (French: La télévision des Azerbaïdjanais)	Maxime Mardoukhaev	1 September 2007
87	2	"Beijing" (French: La télévision des Pékinois)	Stéphane Correa, Brice Pedroletti	15 September 2007
88	3	"Panama" (French: La télévision des Panaméens)	François Badaire	29 September 2007
89	4	"Bangladesh" (French: La télévision des Bangladais)	Mathieu Sarfati	13 October 2007
90	5	"Armenia" (French: La télévision des Arméniens)	Frédéric Tonnoli	27 October 2007
91	6	"Bolivia" (French: La télévision des Boliviens)	Fernando Díaz	10 November 2007
92	7	"Benin" (French: La télévision des Béninois)	Atisso Medessou	24 November 2007
93	8	"Malta" (French: La télévision des Maltais)	Kevin Morris	8 December 2007
94	9	"Denmark†" (French: La télévision des Danois)	Malgosha Gago, Annie Rostad	22 December 2007
95	10	"Madagascar" (French: La télévision des Malgaches)	Régis Michel	22 March 2008
96	11	"Austria†" (French: La télévision des Autrichiens)	Claire Laborey	29 March 2008
97	12	"Florida†" (French: La télévision des Floridiens)	Rebecca Levin	5 April 2008
98	13	"Catalonia" (French: La télévision des Catalans)	Julien Cunillera	19 April 2008
99	14	"Tamil Nadu" (French: La télévision des Tamouls)	Karim Miské	26 April 2008
100	15	"Cameroon" (French: La télévision des Camerounais)	Sylvie Deleule	3 May 2008
101	16	"Bosnia" (French: La télévision des Bosniens)	Fulvia Alberti	17 May 2008
102	17	"Trinidad" (French: La télévision des Trinidadiens)	Ilana Navaro	24 May 2008
103	18	"Inuit" (French: La télévision des Inuit)	Delphine Deloget	31 May 2008
104	19	"Papua New Guinea" (French: La télévision des Papous)	Frédéric Balland, Philipp Mayrhofer	14 June 2008
105	20	"Kazakhstan" (French: La télévision des Kazakhs)	Pierre Caule	6 September 2008
106	21	"Nicaragua" (French: La télévision des Nicaraguayens)	Marion Aldighieri	20 September 2008

=== Season 6 (2008–2009) ===
No. overall	No. in season	Title	Directed by	Original release date
107	1	"Lithuania" (French: La télévision des Lituaniens)	Julien Cunillera	4 October 2008
108	2	"Ecuador" (French: La télévision des Equatoriens)	Fernando Díaz	18 October 2008
109	3	"Slovakia" (French: La télévision des Slovaques)	Jarmila Buzkova	15 November 2008
110	4	"Ivory Coast" (French: La télévision des Ivoiriens)	Stéphane Correa, Cécile de Comarmond	22 November 2008
111	5	"Puerto Rico" (French: La télévision des Portoricains)	Guillaume Gobin	13 December 2008
112	6	"Kyrgyzstan" (French: La télévision des Kirghizes)	Marc Aderghal, Claire Chognot	3 January 2009
113	7	"Chukchi" (French: La télévision des Tchouktches)	Frédéric Tonolli	17 January 2009
114	8	"Mauritius" (French: La télévision des Mauriciens)	Stéphane Correa, Sandy Murden	31 January 2009
115	9	"Ghana" (French: La télévision des Ghanéens)	Kevin Morris	14 February 2009
116	10	"Nepal" (French: La télévision des Népalais)	Delphine Deloget	28 February 2009
117	11	"Dominican Republic" (French: La télévision des Dominicains)	Sergio Mondelo	14 March 2009
118	12	"Suriname" (French: La télévision des Surinamiens)	Roger Strijland	28 March 2009
119	13	"Macedonia" (French: La télévision des Macédoniens)	Fulvia Alberti	11 April 2009
120	14	"Namibia" (French: La télévision des Namibiens)	Jérôme Tournier	25 April 2009
121	15	"Slovenia" (French: La télévision des Slovènes)	Claire Laborey	9 May 2009
122	16	"Paraguay" (French: La télévision des Paraguayens)	Fernando Díaz	23 May 2009
123	17	"Afghanistan" (French: La télévision des Afghans)	Barmak Akram	6 June 2009
124	18	"Burundi" (French: La télévision des Burundais)	Bernadette Balland, Frédéric Balland	20 June 2009
125	19	"Jordan†" (French: La télévision des Jordaniens)	Sylvie Deleule	19 September 2009
126	20	"Comoros" (French: La télévision des Comoriens)	Hervé Rebillon	3 October 2009

=== Season 7 (2009–2011) ===
No. overall	No. in season	Title	Directed by	Original release date
127	1	"Hainan" (French: La télévision des Chinois du Hainan)	Xiao Xing Cheng	17 October 2009
128–129	–	"TV Behind the Iron Curtain†" (French: La télévision derrière le rideau de fer)	Malgosha Gago	31 October 2009 (Part 1); 7 November 2009 (Part 2)
This two-part special explores programming from Eastern Europe during the Cold War.
130	2	"Alaska†" (French: La télévision des Alaskiens)	Rebecca Levin	21 November 2009
131	3	"Latvia" (French: La télévision des Lettons)	Karim Miské	28 November 2009
132	4	"Costa Rica" (French: La télévision des Costaricains)	Sergio Mondelo	5 December 2009
133	5	"Wales†" (French: La télévision des Gallois)	Roxanne Frias	12 December 2009
134	6	"Vietnam" (French: La télévision des Vietnamiens)	Pierre Caule	4 September 2010
135	7	"Hawaii†" (French: La télévision des Hawaiiens)	Pierre-François Didek	18 September 2010
136	8	"Siberia" (French: La télévision des Sibériens)	Vladimir Tchernine	9 October 2010
137	9	"Iraq" (French: La télévision des Irakiens)	Fulvia Alberti	16 October 2010
138	10	"Hunan" (French: La télévision des Hunanais)	Xiao Xing Cheng	30 October 2010
139	11	"Cuba" (French: La télévision des Cubains)	Sergio Mondelo	13 November 2010
140	12	"Bengal†" (French: La télévision des Bengalis)	Claire Chognot, Marc Aderghal	4 December 2010
141	13	"Gabon" (French: La télévision des Gabonais)	Alice Diop	11 December 2010
142	14	"El Salvador" (French: La télévision des Salvadoriens)	Marion Aldighieri	18 December 2010
143	15	"Romani" (French: La télévision des Roms)	Malgosha Gago	25 December 2010
144	16	"Tajikistan" (French: La télévision des Tadjiks)	Gulya Mirzoeva	8 January 2011
145	17	"Congo DRC" (French: La télévision des Congolais de RDC)	Stéphane Correa	29 January 2011
146	18	"Vancouver†" (French: La télévision des Canadiens de Vancouver)	Roxanne Frias	19 February 2011
147	19	"Maldives" (French: La télévision des Maldiviens)	Stéphane Correa	5 March 2011
148	20	"Belarus" (French: La télévision des Biélorusses)	Barbara Necek	12 March 2011
149	21	"Scotland†" (French: La télévision des Écossais)	Roxanne Frias	3 September 2011

== Broadcast ==
TV Around the World mainly airs on Saturdays, initially during 10:10am as Arte became a 24/7 channel. For Season 3, it aired on 2:40pm and from Season 4 onwards, it aired on 6:30pm.

=== International broadcasts ===
The German-language version, titled Zapping International, is simulcast in Arte's German counterpart during the program's run. Selected episodes of that version also aired in SRF 1 in Switzerland between 2006 and 2007.

In Quebec, the original French-language version airs in TV5 Quebec Canada from January 2011, starting with the episode focusing in Cuban television.

In Australia, SBS aired episodes from the English version's first and second seasons as a ten-part series, with the first episode focusing in Greek television on 3 February 2006 before airing the rest in June.

A Brazilian Portuguese dub of the series aired on TV Brasil from 2009 to 2015.

== Book ==
In September 2007, co-creator Vladimir Donn wrote a book based on the series which highlights the programming and their impact to viewers from the countries featured in the documentary. It was published by Arte Editions and Le Seuil. ISBN 978-2020931625
