= NTA Kano =

- Country: Nigeria
- Broadcast area: Kano State
- Headquarters: Kano, Nigeria

Programming
- Languages: English, Hausa

Ownership
- Owner: Nigerian Television Authority

History
- Launched: 17 October 1976

Availability

Terrestrial
- VHF: Channel 5 (Kano)

NTA Kano is a Network Centre of the Nigerian Television Authority in Kano State. It replaced a relay station of Radio Kaduna Television upon the creation of new states and the NTA.

== History ==
Kano was formerly a part of the Northern Region, and was served by a relay station of Radio Kaduna Television, being installed in February 1963. On 17 October 1976, NTV Kano started broadcasting (already in colour) on VHF channel 5 in Kano, channel 7 in Birnin Kudu and channel 8 in Arbus to cover the entire state, as well as parts of Borno and Bauchi. The signal was also receivable in parts of southern Niger via overspill.

With the establishment of the Nigerian Television Authority in 1977, Kano was placed inside Zone D, together with NTA Kaduna and NTA Jos (the former Benue-Plateau Television) with Kaduna being the regional Zonal Network Centre. As of 1979, NTA Kaduna still produced a weekly half-hour programme aiming at Kano, Focus on Kano State.

In the early 1980s, the station gained new studios and new trained equipment, in order to produce programmes for the Network Service, as well as content exchange with other NTA stations. Between 2 October 1977 and 6 June 2003, the station aired 1,176 Hindi films, the first of which being Ann Bonn.

The station installed a new transmitter in December 2000. Plans were enacted in September 2008 to urge the station to become a Network Centre.
