= Olusola Momoh =

Nigerian media executive

- Citizenship: Nigerian
- Education: University of Lagos, Harvard Business School
- Occupations: Media executive, Journalist
- Years active: 42 Years
- Organization: Channels Television
- Spouse: John Momoh
- Children: Three

Olusola Momoh is a Nigerian media executive. She is the co-founder and vice-chair of Channels Media Group, the parent company of Channels Television. Momoh graduated with a BSc degree in mass communication (print journalism) from the University of Lagos. She also holds a diploma in broadcast journalism from UniLag.

In 2014, She was a part of the Women Leadership Forum Programme of the Harvard Business School.

== Career ==
Prior to founding Channels Television and subsequently Channels Media Group, Momoh was a reporter, newscaster and producer with the Nigerian Television Authority, between 1979 and 1987. During this period, she produced several reports on the oil spillage.

Apart from her broadcast experience, Momoh has a seven-year experience in the banking sector. She was the Pioneer Head of Corporate Affairs Department at the International Merchant Bank (IMB). Subsequently, she worked in other departments in IMB including Treasury and Credit.

== Awards ==
In 2019, Momoh received an honorary doctorate degree in business administration at the Achievers University, Owo, Ondo State. In November 2021, she was recognised as one of the 20 powerful women at the Women in Management, Business and Public Service's 20th Annual Conference Legend Ball held in Lagos, Nigeria. She was also included in the 2021 list of "Most Powerful Women in Journalism" in Nigeria.
