= NTA Abuja =

Television station in Abuja, Nigeria

NTA Abuja is a television station in Abuja, FCT, owned by the Nigerian Television Authority. It operates the VHF station of the same name on channel 5 and a UHF outlet (NTA Plus, channel 21).

== History ==
With its transmitter located at Suleja, NTA Abuja conducted test transmissions on 12 October 1981 and started full-time transmissions on 27 January 1982. The role of NTA Abuja was to eventually become the station for the national capital, which was only achieved in 1987. By the early 90s, years after the relocation of the capital, there were plans to enlarge its editorial presence, especially since its size by the time the president moved in December 1991 was still minimal. For 1992, NTA Abuja intended to build a larger studio with an editing suite, cameras and other equipment. The station was already equipped with DOMSAT in order to send news items locally and later filed nationally using the system for sending the stories to Lagos and the NTA Network News. The station as of 1992 had a 10 kW transmitter and operated from 4pm to midnight.
