= NTA2 =

- Country: Nigeria
- Broadcast area: Lagos State
- Headquarters: Lagos, Nigeria

Programming
- Languages: English, Yoruba

Ownership
- Owner: Nigerian Television Authority
- Sister channels: NTA Lagos

History
- Launched: April 1980

Availability

Terrestrial
- VHF: Channel 5 (Lagos)
- StarTimes: Channel 104 (Lagos)

NTA2 is a television station available in Lagos, the largest city of Nigeria. It is one of the two secondary channels owned by the Nigerian Television Authority, with the only other such channel being NTA Plus in Abuja.

== History ==
NTA2 came to be in 1980 over a dispute between the Nigerian Television Authority and Lagos Television over possible VHF frequencies to be used. The NTA strongly opposed the plans of the state government to set up a television station on channel 5. Ultimately the NTA remained on channel 5 while Lagos Television was relocated to channel 8. The station, unlike channel 10 (NTA Lagos) catered a more urban elite, which also included widely travelled Nigerians, as well as its status as the main commercial centre that also housed most of the foreign missions in Nigeria.

While the other NTA stations operated on a 60% Nigerian content quota, NTA2 did the opposite. Its operation was the most widely-commercial out of the whole network. The influx of foreign programming was in order to cater local interests in Lagos alone. The station primarily carried entertainment content, such as sitcoms, music videos, melodramas and international feature films. Most of the content carried was American. It and NTA Ikeja were set to compete with Lagos Television in programming strategies.

In the 1990s, the station opened at 4pm. By this time the channel carried a wide variety of international cartoons, dramas and sitcoms, the latter of which were mainly black sitcoms from the USA. The emergence of private television stations in Nigeria caused NTA2 to gradually lose its prestige.

NTA2 was a full-time affiliate of TVAfrica, unlike other NTA stations that only used the network for sporting events. In 2008, the channel was part of the DStv-provided MTN Mobile TV package in Nigeria.

Between 2018 and 2020, the station carried Shuga, when it was produced in Nigeria.
