= John Momoh =

Nigerian businessman and journalist

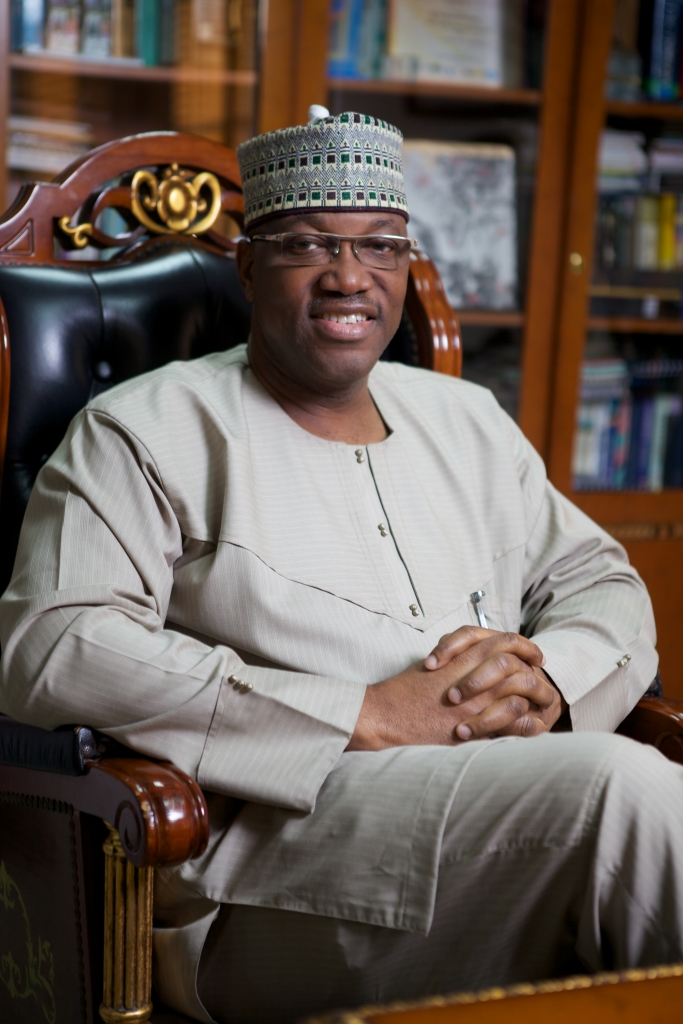
- Born: Lagos, Lagos State, Nigeria
- Other name: John Olatchy Momoh
- Education: Baptist Academy; University of Lagos; Harvard Business School
- Occupations: Entrepreneur; Broadcast journalist
- Employer: Channels TV
- Known for: Channels TV CEO
- Board member of: Channels TV (Chairman and CEO)
- Spouse: Olusola Momoh
- Awards: Officer of the Order of the Niger (2005); Lifetime Achievement Award (2006); Entrepreneur of the Year (2008); Leadership Award (2014)
- Website: channelstv.com

John Momoh is a Nigerian broadcast journalist and the Chairman and CEO of Channels TV, an independent and multiple award-winning 24-hour news and media television channel based in Lagos. He is widely recognized in Nigeria as a transformative industry pioneer with the 37-year-long career in news television broadcasting.

He delivered the maiden edition of Distinguished Lecture Series of the University of Lagos Mass Communication Alumni Association entitled "The Mass Media: Setting the Nigerian Agenda." He was appointed the acting chairman of UNILAG Governing Council by the administration of President Muhammadu Buhari on 21 August 2020.

== Early life and education ==
John Momoh is of Etsakọ origin. Momoh was brought up in Lagos State, southwestern Nigeria and his father was a cook. Over the past decades, he has built a commercial satellite television station with a reputable integrity in a country where the media sector is tainted by corruption. John Momoh graduated from Baptist Academy and the University of Lagos with a bachelor's degree in Mass Communication and a master's degree in International Law and Diplomacy. In June 2013, he received the Lagos Business School’s Distinguished Alumni Award. John Momoh has a professional Diploma from the UK’s Thomson Foundation, an alumnus of University of Lagos, Lagos Business School, and Harvard Business School, and is Fellow of the Nigerian Guild of Editors and the Nigerian Institute of Journalism.

== Career ==
Prior to starting Channels Television, which he founded in 1995, John worked variously as news anchor, senior reporter, and senior producer for Nigeria’s National Radio and Television Stations, Federal Radio Corporation of Nigeria and the Nigerian Television Authority.

== Awards and recognition ==
In December 2005, he was proclaimed "Officer of the Order of the Niger" by the Nigerian Government.

In 2006, he was honored with a Lifetime Achievement Award by the Nigerian Information Society, and, two years later, he was nominated as Nigeria’s Entrepreneur of the Year by the Fate Foundation.

In October 2014, he joined the Board of Directors of the Constituency for Africa (CFA), an African-focused organization located in Washington, District of Columbia. In November of the same year, John Momoh was honoured the Leadership Award at the 2014 Planet Africa Awards held at the Grand Victorian Convention Centre in Canada.

John Momoh is a Fellow of The International Visitor Programme (IVP), an initiative of the United States Information Agency, a Chevening Fellow and a Fellow of the "African Future Leaders", both initiatives of the British Government’s Foreign and Commonwealth Office. He is a member of the International Academy of Television Arts and Sciences based in New York, and has served as a juror for the International Emmy Awards. He is also serving as a juror for the AIB Awards presented by the Association for International Broadcasters. In November 2016, John Momoh was sworn in as the Chairman of Broadcasting Organizations of Nigeria (BON).

== See also ==
- Channels TV
