= NTA Yenagoa =

NTA Yenagoa is the regional centre of the Nigerian Television Authority based in the city of Yenagoa in Bayelsa State. The station shares its facilities with an FM radio station.

== History ==
The state government was finishing the construction of the station in March 2001.

As of 2021, much of the station's records were kept mainly in paper format.

Beginning in 2022, the station broadcasts from the Ernest Ikoli Media Complex. In 2024, Precious David-Odaga, speaking at a virtual Dataphyte conference, plans to produce programmes concerning the gender gap for the station.
