= Wale Fakile =

- Born: Lagos, Nigeria
- Occupations: Broadcast journalist, TV presenter,
- Years active: 2010-present

Wale Fakile is a Nigerian broadcast journalist, television presenter, and media consultant . He is best known as the host of Gist Nigeria, a current affairs television programme co-produced by the BBC and Channels Television. Fakile is widely recognized for his storytelling approach, blending traditional journalism with digital formats to connect with younger audiences across Nigeria and West Africa.

== Career ==
Fakile began his broadcasting career in 2010 with Artleone Communications, where he produced and presented key programmes, including the network’s flagship breakfast show, Morning Brew.

In 2011, he joined GoodLife Promotions, one of Nigeria’s early online television and media communications firms, where he supervised the production of its first magazine publication and served as lead editor and writer.

He moved to TVC Communications in 2012, starting as a website content producer before transitioning to on-air roles. By 2014, he gained nationwide recognition as the host of Question of the Day, a segment of the network’s 10 p.m. news bulletin that incorporated social media feedback into live television which was a newly introduced format in Nigerian broadcasting at the time. Fakile also anchored Trends, a youth-oriented current affairs programme that explored social, cultural, and political issues shaping Africa’s digital generation.

During the 2015 Nigerian general elections, Fakile coordinated social media coverage for TVC News, helping expand the network’s digital reach and audience engagement.

In 2018, he joined the BBC as a Broadcast Journalist and became the Lead Presenter of Gist Nigeria, the BBC’s first and only television co-production in West Africa. The show has reportedly reached more than a million weekly viewers across Nigeria, Sierra Leone, and Liberia.

=== Qualifications ===
Fakile is a certified journalist and safety professional, holding multiple journalism and production certifications from the BBC Academy.

== Personal life ==
Beyond journalism, Fakile is the founder of Rach. Gabriels, a bespoke men’s footwear and clothing brand. Through the brand, he launched Project Centum, a five-year social impact initiative designed to train and equip 100 indigent youths annually in shoemaking and entrepreneurship across Nigeria.
