= Maupe Ogun =

Nigerian journalist

Maupe Ogun-Yusuf
- Other name: Esther
- Citizenship: Nigerian
- Education: University of Lagos; University of East Anglia
- Occupations: media personnel, journalist
- Employer: Channels Television
- Spouse: Bamidele Mohammed Yusuf
- Children: Two

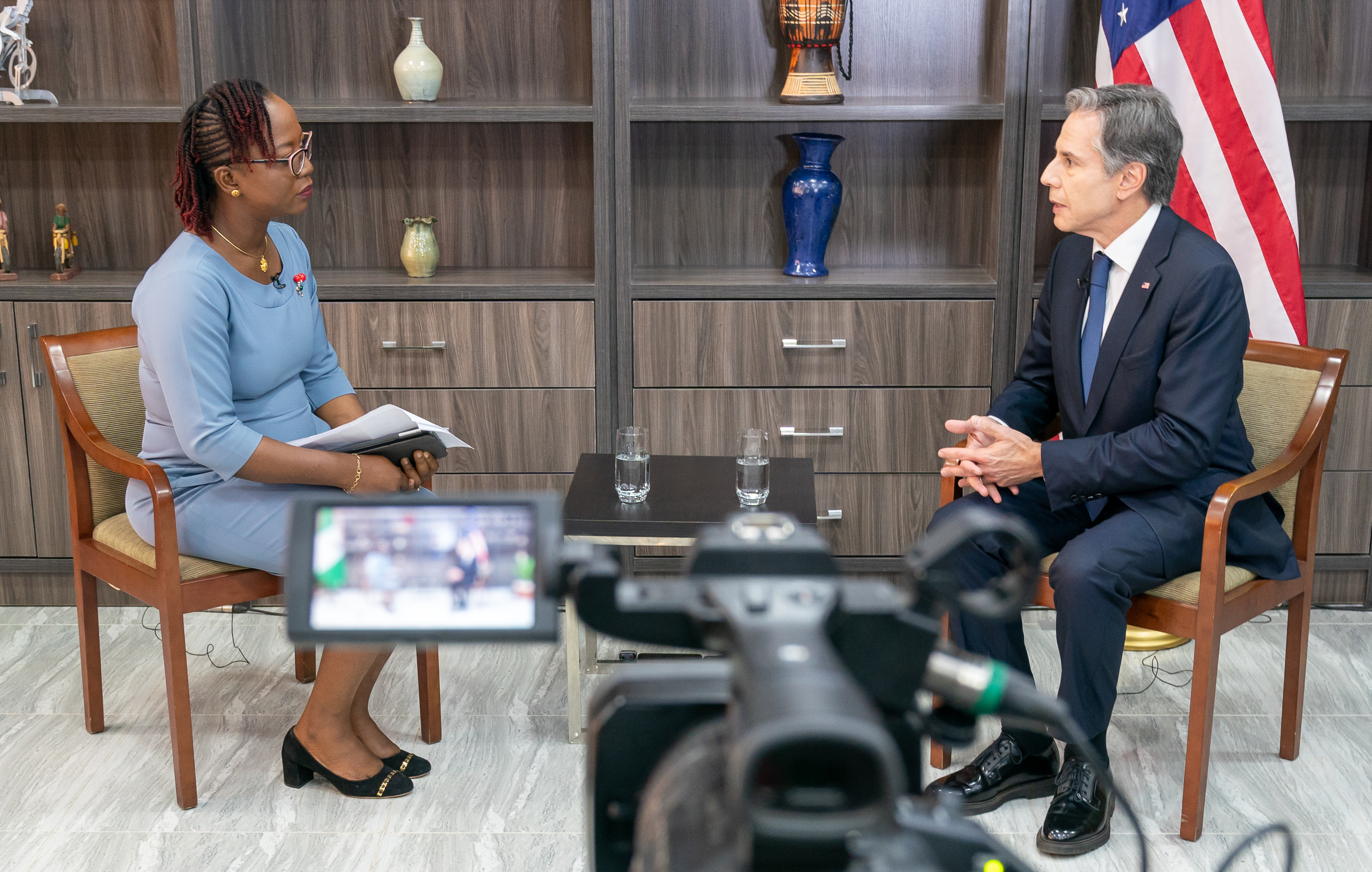
Ogun-Yusuf interviews US Secretary of State Antony Blinken in 2021.

Maupe Ogun-Yusuf is a media personality and Nigerian journalist. She is a co-host of Sunrise Daily at Channels TV.

== Education ==
Ogun-Yusuf is a graduate from University of Lagos where she had her B.A in English. She later proceeded to her master's in international relations and development studies at the University of East Anglia in Norwich. She is also an alumnus of Delta Steel Technical High School with the Likes of Mitchell Elegbe, and Qriss-Henry Ogwu.

== Career ==
Ogun-Yusuf is the co-host of a morning show, Sunrise Daily at Channels TV. She joined Channels TV in 2009. She was summoned to court alongside the manager of Channels TV in 2018 for allegedly giving a platform for some prejudicial comments about the issue between Olisa Metuh and the Federal Government. She also hosted a live controversy that happened between Jimoh Moshood, Chief Superintendent of Police, and Terver Akase, Chief Press Secretary to Benue State governor. The show had to be taken off air due to the heated argument between the duo.

== Award ==
She got profession achievements award from British Council UK Education Alumni Award in 2016. She also got Outstanding Television Broadcaster award from Nigerian Institute of Public Relations in 2019. She was also named among the best 100 by Sun Newspapers Women Leadership Award.

== Personal life ==
She married Bamidele Mohammed Yussuf on 28 December 2017. She gave birth to her first child in Texas, United States in 2018. Ogun-Yusuf had her second baby in Nigeria in the midst of Covid-19 in September 2020
