= Kayode Okikiolu =

Nigerian journalist

Kayode Okikiolu is a Nigerian broadcast journalist, television anchor, and producer at Channels Television. He has anchored news and current affairs programmes and covered nationally broadcast events.

== Early life and education ==
Okikiolu was born on 22 October 1990. He attended the University of Ibadan, where he earned a bachelor's degree in psychology. He is an associate of the Chartered Institute of Personnel Management (CIPM) and as of 2025, was enrolled in the Executive MBA programme at Lagos Business School.

== Career ==
Okikiolu began his broadcasting career at Salt 98.1 FM, operated by the Ebonyi Broadcasting Corporation and The Beat 97.9 FM in Ibadan. Okikiolu later transitioned to television broadcasting and joined Channels Television. At the network, he has served as a senior anchor and producer. He has anchored several programmes, including News at 10, Politics Today, and the breakfast programme Sunrise Daily.

== 2021 DSS invitation incident ==
In August 2021, Okikiolu was involved in a widely reported press freedom–related incident following the broadcast of two interviews on Sunrise Daily. One interview featured Benue State Governor Samuel Ortom, who criticised the federal government's handling of insecurity, while the second featured retired Naval Commodore Kunle Olawunmi, who made allegations concerning the sponsorship of insurgency by high-ranking officials.

Following the broadcasts, the National Broadcasting Commission (NBC) queried Channels Television, describing the content as inciting and divisive. Okikiolu and his co-anchor, Chamberlain Usoh, were subsequently invited by the Department of State Services (DSS) for questioning in Abuja.

Initial reports suggested that the journalists had been arrested, but subsequent statements clarified that they were invited for questioning and were later released. The incident received national media coverage and was criticised by civil society groups and press freedom advocates.

== Awards and recognition ==
In December 2025, Okikiolu was named Newscaster of the Year at the Nigeria Media Merit Awards (NMMA). He was also announced as one of the recipients of the Hostwriter Creator's Prize. In the same period, he was recognised as Pressman of the Year by the Most Influential People of African Descent organisation.
