= NTA Ikeja =

Former Nigerian Television Station

NTA Ikeja was a television station in Ikeja, Lagos State, owned by the Nigerian Television Authority. It operated on VHF channel 7 throughout its existence.

== History ==
NTA Ikeja was commissioned by Vice President Alex Ekwueme on 27 September 1981. The station's transmitter was located at Tejuosho, aiming at the local communities within the state of Lagos. The station was the 21st NTA station at the time of launch. NTA Ikeja was inserted in Zone A, in south-western Nigeria, led by NTA Ibadan and also oversaw NTA Abeokuta.

NTA Ikeja was created to fill in the gap caused by NTA Lagos where the existing station targeted largely an audience within the city. Furthermore, Ikeja was selected on purpose to act as a station for the state's rural areas, as Lagos, at the time, not only was the capital of the eponymous state, but was also the federal capital until the creation of Abuja.

The station produced a successful debate programme, Counterpoint, from 1982 to 1985.

In the early 1990s, NTA Ikeja produced the following programmes: Feyikogbon (Sundays, 4-5pm), the ombudsman programme Gboro Mi Ro (Sundays, 5pm), family and childcare programme Omolere (Wednesdays, 7pm), quiz show Tan' Moo (Saturdays, 2:30pm), a daily news service in English, Yoruba and Egun (English taking 15 minutes of the slot, the remaining 15 in Yoruba) at 7:30pm, Our Guest (Wednesdays, 8pm), Issues of the Day (Sundays, 10pm), Yoruba comedy-drama Erin Keke (Wednesdays, 7pm) and discussion programme E Kowe Si Wa (Fridays, 7pm). NTA Ikeja was also proposing the creation of further programmes: E Yin Oluwa (Christian), Al-Deen (Muslim) and Itage Ewe (youth, school plays)

In June 1997, NTA Ikeja had sent a record number of items for the 9pm NTA Network News.

NTA Ikeja shut down in 2000; the decision was faced by some pressure. The Peoples Democratic Party accused NTA Director-General Ben Murray-Bruce of "ethnic cleansing" of Yorubas, that comprised much of the station's workforce.
