= Stoeber =

Stoeber is a surname. Notable people with the surname include:

- Adolphe Stoeber (1810–1892), French ecclesiastic and writer
- Jack Stoeber (1898–1971), American college football player and coach
- Orville Stoeber (born 1947), American singer/songwriter, actor, and artist

== See also ==
- Stober
