= Chuka Momah =

Nigerian sport reporter

Chuka Momah // is a Nigerian sport reporter and administrator. He is a former president of the Nigerian Tennis Federation and the Confederation of African Tennis. In 2013, he published Sports Spectacular, a book about sport stories and analysis of sport in Nigeria.

== Education and Career ==
Momah attended Government College, Ibadan and he is a microbiology graduate of University of Nigeria. He was a member of the university's cricket team that won the cricket event at the 1974 NUGA games.

After graduation, Momah worked at a few private firms, retiring in 1985 with Hoechst. He has worked as both a print and broadcast commentator on sports. He was a columnist for the National Concord between the years 1982 and 1985 and a contributing editor at Newswatch. He was the anchorman on NTA's Sport Spectacular broadcast on network service and presented Big Fights of the Decades also on NTA.
