= Feyikogbon =

Nigerian television program

Feyikogbon was a Nigerian television program that first aired on NTA Channel 7, Lagos. It is considered one of the country's longest running Yoruba language television series. The show aired on Sundays on a few NTA channels in Southwestern Nigeria in the 1980s.

A revamped Feyikogbon produced by Yinka Ogundaisi began airing on one of DStv's Africa Magic channels in 2014.

== Plot ==
Feyikogbon was a Yoruba series that used a Storytelling format similar to another popular Nigerian TV show, Tales by Moonlight and ends with an ethical advice to the audience. Each episode of Feyikogbon consist of a realistic story and play that draws the attention of the TV audience who will like to know the outcome and moral of the play. The beginning of the show usually starts at the home of Ayo Mogaji, the head of Feyikongbon village. The mogaji is seated in his compound and begins to tell the villagers stories imbibed with Yoruba proverbs which are intended to teach a lesson on how to ethically navigate through life. At the end of the show, there is usually a moral message for the audience then followed by the character of Ayo Mogaji entertaining the audience by dancing to traditional Yoruba beats.

== Characters ==
- Sunday Akanbi Akinola as Ayodele 'Baba Ibeji' Oko Awero. Baba Ibeji styles himself as the Mogaji of feyikogbonland.
- Ajobiewe
- Bimbo
- Wunmi
- Awero
- Busari
- Saamu
- Dehinde
