= Becky Umeh =

Nigerian artistic director, choreographer, singer, actress, and dancer

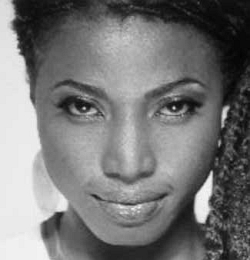
- Umeh in 2010
- Born: Becky UzoAmaka Umeh; Anambra State, Nigeria
- Occupations: Choreographer, dancer, actress
- Years active: 1985–present
- Website: zomema.com

Becky UzoAmaka Umeh is a Nigerian artistic director, choreographer, singer, actress, and dancer.

== Biography ==
=== Early life ===
Umeh was born in Anambra State, Nigeria, but grew up in Lagos from the age of five. In 1992, she gained national visibility as an actress in the Nigerian Television Authority children's drama Tales by Moonlight. She was also cast in the independent films Jezebel, Twist of Fate, Living Ghost, Amazon, among others.

From 1994 to 1998, Umeh studied traditional and contemporary African dance, on full scholarship, at Ivory Dance Academy, founded by National Troupe of Nigeria member Steve James. While studying, she toured with the school's group Ivory Ambassadors, and conducted field research on traditional dance in Nigerian villages.

=== Nigeria, 1998 to 2002 ===
Upon graduation, Umeh served as the Dance Director of Ivory Dance Troupe for five years, directing and producing shows for Guinness, Mobile, Chevron, Seven-Up Bottling Company, etc. After a brief tour to Ghana, she travelled to Paris during the 1998 FIFA World Cup with the soccer team of Nigeria. Becky Umeh launched her singing career and founded her band, and together they produced the album "Aiye".

From 1998 to 2001, Umeh co-hosted the TV show Dance Jam Competition. In 2002, following her production of the cultural fiesta Afrifest, where she brought the dance troupes of Africa together, Umeh served as assistant choreographer for the Miss Nigeria beauty pageant and the winner became Miss World 2002. Places where Becky Umeh performed include: the French Cultural Center, the Goethe-Institut, the Nigeria Music Awards, and the federal capital Abuja. She was active in pressing the Nigerian Government to provide artists with forms of support which were not harnessed to the Government's own propaganda goals.

=== United States, 2002 to present ===
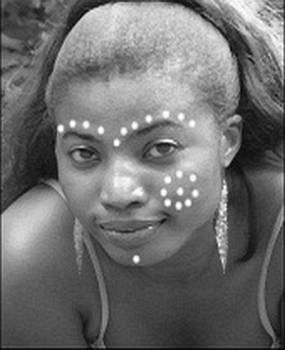
Umeh in 2010

Since moving to Washington, D.C. in 2002, Umeh has worked with producers such as Hugh Medrano, Nancy Havlik (stage director) and George Faison (New York choreographer). She has performed for non-profit organisations such as the Red Cross, the Nigerian Embassy, and many cultural centres, universities, and churches. In 2005, Umeh went on tour with Toby Foyeh and Orchestra Africa to North and South Carolina, Massachusetts, and New York's Syracuse Festival.

From 2004 till present, Umeh has continued to work and performed with the Malcolm X Drum Ensemble led by Doc Powel, and volunteered as Community Outreach Coordinator for UAA Foundation, a non-profit organisation with mission to raise awareness about violence against women www.UAAfoundation.org.

In 2006, Umeh choreographed the Lion King production sponsored by Metropolitan Fine Arts in Virginia. In 2009 Umeh formed the Zomema Dance Ensemble, which performs traditional and contemporary African dance works under her direction.

In 2011, she wrote and published her first stage play "Legend of Abiku Zombeh".

Umeh was tapped as language facilitator and choreographer by Richmond University in their seasonal Stage production Things Fall Apart written by Nigerian novelist and poet Chinua Achebe.

== Choreography ==
- 2002: Gladiator Cheerleaders, for MTN South African Television
- 2004: Dancer, for Hispanic Gala Theater in production "Candonbe"
- 2006: Lion King for Metropolitan Fine Arts in Virginia
- 2008: You think you can dance! (Dance Drama)
- 2008: Contemporary Bata
- 2009: Benin
- 2010: Akoto
- 2010: "Sisi" (Soukous; song by Becky Umeh)
- 2011: (Actress, choreographer)"Things fall Apart at University of Richmond, Department of Theatre Arts
- 2011: Caribbean festival, Adams Morgan day festival and Hispanic Fiesta.
- 2011: "Toron" (High Life; song by Becky Umeh)
- 2011: "Korofo" (Afrobeat Modern; song by Becky Umeh)
- 2012: "Bata Columbia" (Nigerian Bata and Masquerade to Rumba Columbia Music)
- 2012: "Butterfly" (High Life; song by Becky Umeh)
- 2012: "Ekwe" (Soukous; song by Becky Umeh)
- 2012: "Jokale" (Contemporary Nigerian: song by Becky Umeh)
- 2013: "Obodo Coupe ( Fast past, category- world music)
- 2013: "Angels and Demons (Rock style)

== Stage ==
- 1995: Aruku Shanka by Felix Okolo (Nigeria)
- 1999: Trial of Oba Ovoramwen by Bayo Oduneye (Nigeria)
- 2000: Obaseki by Pedro Obaseki (Nigeria)
- 2004: Candombe! Tango Negro USA
- 2011: Things Fall Apart USA
- 2012: United Aid for Africa Foundation Concert. NY USA
- 2012: United Aid for Africa Concert, Gabon Embassy and Ivory Coast Embassy, Washington DC USA

== Film appearances ==
- 2009: twisted fate

== Television ==
- 1992: Tales of Moonlight, Nigerian Television Authority
- 1998: Dance Jam Competition (co-host) Nigerian Television Authority

== Music (as alejo) ==
Year	Title	Producer	Publisher
1998	Aiye	Nelson Brown	
2000	Sisi		
2009	My Creation	Jamix (Abuja Nigeria)	CDBaby
2010	Zomema	Jamix (Abuja Nigeria)	
2010	Mama	Nelson Brown	
2010	Ayaya	Nkeng	OneMicStudio
2010	Stand up	Alejo, Nkeng	OneMicStudio
2010	Toron	A.J. Alemanji, Nkeng	OneMicStudio
2010	Geleleno	Jamix (Abuja Nigeria)	

== Bibliography ==
- Lena Armstrong; Becky Umeh (1990). Becky Umeh Artistically Known as Alejo. Washington DC: El Rumbero Europeo.
