= Bauchi State Television =

Bauchi State Television (BATV)
- Country: Nigeria
- Broadcast area: Nationwide
- Headquarters: Bauchi

Ownership
- Owner: Bauchi State Government

History
- Launched: 1998; 28 years ago

Links
- Website: www.bauchistate.gov.ng

Bauchi State Television is a television broadcasting station owned by Bauchi State Government. It was established in 1998 with its corporate Head office located at Wuntin Dada, along Jos Road, Bauchi, Bauchi State, Nigeria. Babayo Rufai Muhammad is the current Director Programs at the Bauchi State Television (BATV).

== See also ==
- Nigerian Television Authority
