= Boniface Offokaja =

Nigerian journalist

Bonniface Offokaja
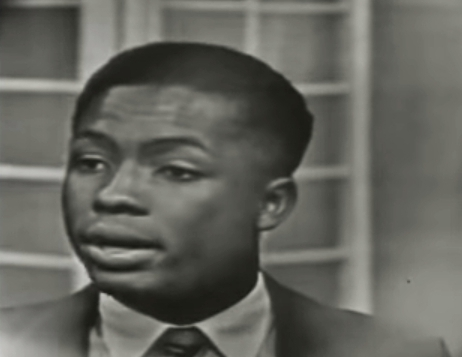
- Offokaja at 1957 high school debate
- Born: Boniface Okechukwu Offokaja; May 21, 1940; Northern Region, British Nigeria (now Kano State, Nigeria)
- Died: 10 November 2018 (aged 78)
- Occupation(s): Broadcaster, entrepreneur

Boniface Okechukwu Offokaja (21 May 1940 – 10 November 2018) was a Nigerian broadcaster. He was one of the secondary school students who represented Nigeria in a 1957 High School debate. He became the first Nigerian to become the head of the news department, Nigerian Television Service (NTV) in 1963.

== Life and education ==
Boniface Offokaja was born in the Northern Nigeria region (present-day Kano State) on 21 May 1941. His parents were Thomas Igala Offokaja and Susanna Offokaja.

He attended St. Gregory College, Lagos, Nigeria. He subsequently enrolled into the University of London, where he studied history and economics. He then went over to the Sorbonne University in Paris where he studied History of Ideas. He afterwards became a practicing broadcaster.

== Career ==
Offokaja worked as a broadcaster. He was the first Nigerian to head the news department of the Nigerian Television service (NTV) beginning from June 1963.

During the Nigerian Civil War (1967–1970), he worked with AFP in the East-Central State. He afterwards became director of news and current affairs.

He retired from active service in 1984, as director general of Anambra Broadcasting Service (ABS). The Anambra State government owed him part of his retirement gratuity, which got paid during the administration of governor Willie Obiano, in 2017, alongside a veteran Nollywood actor, Pete Edochie, who worked at the same place and retired in 1998.
