= Eugenia Abu =

Nigerian writer and broadcast journalist

- Born: Eugenia Jummai Amodu; 19 October 1962 (age 63); Zaria, Nigeria
- Education: City, University of London Ahmadu Bello University
- Occupations: Journalist; television host
- Years active: 1979–present
- Children: 6

Eugenia Abu (born Eugenia Jummai Amodu on 19 October 1962) is a Nigerian broadcast journalist, writer, poet and media consultant, best known as a former News Anchor and Correspondent for the Nigerian Television Authority NTA. Eugenia Abu is considered one of Nigeria's finest broadcasters and commères. She anchored the 9:00 pm news on NTA for seventeen years.

== Early life and education ==
Abu was born in Kaduna in 1962. She started writing at the age of 7. She describes her parents as one of the greatest influences in her life. She attended ABU Staff School, Zaria and Queen Amina College, Kaduna for her primary and secondary schools respectively. Eugenia Abu studied English at the Ahmadu Bello University Zaria, where she graduated in 1981. Eugenia obtained a Master's Degree in Communication Policy Studies from the City, University of London in 1992, graduating with a distinction. She also possesses a Graduate Certificate in Education from A.B.U Zaria (1981). While a student in ABU, she was the acting editor of the English literary magazine, Kuka, in 1982, and she also ran for the post of the Vice President of the Students' Union Government (SUG).

She is an alumna of the Chevening Scholarship and a USIS fellow.

Eugenia Abu established the Eugenia Abu Media Center, a reading and mentorship hub for young Nigeria Creatives, in 2018. The center hosts an annual creative and literary boot camps for children between the ages of 7–15 years.

== Writing and poetry ==
Abu is a Writer and Poet. Her book In the Blink of an Eye won the ANA/NDDC Flora Nwapa Prize for best female writing in 2008. She is also the Author of Don’t look at me like that, a poetry collection.
