= NTA Benin =

NTA Benin is a Zonal Network Centre of the Nigerian Television Authority. The station broadcasts from Benin City, Edo State.

== History ==
NTA Benin started broadcasts in April 1973 as the Bendel State Television Service. As of the early 1980s, the station was engaged in the creation of educational programmes for schools, while 70% of its output in 1981 was local.

With the creation of the current Nigerian Television Authority, NTA Benin was the head station of zone B, which also comprised other stations in south-central Nigeria, in Akure, Owerri and Port Harcourt.

By the mid-1980s, NTA Benin only had two cameras.
