= NTA Port Harcourt =

NTA Port Harcourt is the Nigerian Television Authority regional centre for the state of Rivers in south-central Nigeria, headquartered in its capital Port Harcourt. It is also the zonal network centre for the area. The station broadcasts on VHF channel 10.

== History ==
NTA Port Harcourt's origins date back to the signal expansion of Eastern Nigeria Television (ENTV) in the 1960s; the station was limited up until then to Enugu. New states were created in 1967, causing the creation of Rivers State. The independent station for Rivers state began broadcasting on 31 December 1974. With the creation of the Nigerian Television Authority, the local station was inserted in zone B together with Benin, Aba-Owerri and Akure; it still received spillover from NTA Calabar in the early 80s.

By 1983, NTA Port Harcourt was one of the most developed stations in the network, and produced 80% of the programmes it aired.

In the early 1980s, the station reported on oil spillings in Rivers State; however, the reporter was arrested.

In the 1980s, it produced the horror series Willi-Willi for the Network Service.
