= Television in the Democratic Republic of the Congo =

Television was introduced into the Democratic Republic of the Congo on 24 November 1966. RTNC is the state broadcaster. There is also a large number of private television stations, operating at national and regional levels, as well as religious stations. Programming is conducted in French, Lingala and other regional languages.

== History ==
The first television broadcast of the RTNC took place on 24 November 1966, three hours a day (7pm to 10pm), on VHF channel 5, following the culmination of an agreement between the broadcaster and OCORA, the French media cooperation agency of the time, and US company RCA. In April 1967, a second television station in Lubumbashi was set up by the College of Saint Frances of Salles. In 1969, estimates showed that Kinshasa alone had some 10,000 to 11,000 television sets, while Lubumbashi had 2,000. Telecasts from Télé Congo (of the adjacent capital city of Brazzaville, of the Republic of the Congo) were also easily receivable. The first viewing center for RTNC broadcasts was installed in the village of Menkao in September 1969; similar plans were underway for other such centers within the catchment areas of the television stations in Kinshasa and Lubumbashi.

In 1971, the country was renamed Zaire; the corporation was subsequently renamed Office Zaïrois de Radiodiffusion et de Télévision (OZRT), and the channel Télé-Zaïre. In preparation for the start of color broadcasts in 1974, Télé-Zaïre received US$1.6 million investments from RCA, which not only saw the implementation of color television, but also increased the facilities in Kinshasa. Upon implementing color television that year, it was one of the two countries in Africa to do so, the other being Tanzania (through Television Zanzibar). On 24 November 1978, the first satellite broadcast was held connecting Kinshasa and Lubumbashi through DOMSAT (later renamed REZATELSAT - Résesau de Télécommunication par satellite) costing US$85 million. The project envisioned the distribution of Télé-Zaïre using the Intelsat IV satellite and the installation of seventeen television transmitters, as well as microwave links from Bukavu to Goma and Uvira, as well as from Lubumbashi to Kolwezi and Kikasi.

The first private television station to go on air in Zaire was Antenne A, on 13 June 1997. In 1997, the country's name reverted back to the Democratic Republic of the Congo and the name RTNC was restored. In March 1999, RTNC opened a second channel, RTNC 2, covering Kinshasa.

In 2006, there were 54 channels, 38 of which in Kinshasa. Some channels were directly linked to political parties or were close to them.

On 14 June 2026, the Ministry of Communications and Media issued warnings to 58 commercial television stations, available on digital terrestrial television in Kinshasa, to review their financial situations within 48 hours, or else they would be switched off from RENATELSAT's network.

== Channels ==
As of 2023, 107 channels had a license to operate on the digital terrestrial television network in Kinshasa, out of 262 stations.
