= Channels TV =

24-hour overseas news channel from Nigeria

Channels Television
- Channels Television logo
- Country: Nigeria
- Broadcast area: UK; Africa
- Headquarters: Lagos, Lagos State, Nigeria

Programming
- Language: English

Ownership
- Owner: John Momoh (Executive Chairman); Olusola Momoh (Executive Vice-Chairman)

History
- Launched: 1992

Links
- Website: channelstv.com

Availability

Terrestrial
- UHF: Channel 26 (Benin)
- UHF: Channel 31 (Abuja)
- UHF: Channel 39 (Lagos)
- UHF: Channel 45 (Kano)

Streaming media
- channelstv.com/live: Watch live (Available worldwide)

Channels Television is a Nigerian independent 24-hour news and media television channel based in Lagos, Nigeria. The parent company, Channels Incorporated, was founded in 1992, a year before the Nigerian government deregulated the broadcast media. It began broadcasting in 1995. Its primary focus is producing news and current affairs programs on Nigerian domestic issues. The channel's mission is to act as a watchdog on governmental policies and activities.

== History ==
Channels Television was founded in 1995 as a private television station with only 15 employees by Nigerian broadcaster and entrepreneur John Momoh and Sola Momoh, also a broadcaster. The company commenced operations in Lagos, south western Nigeria and has since grown to include three other stations in Abuja, Edo and Kano states. It also has bureaus in almost every state in Nigeria, including stringers and affiliates in other parts in Africa, as well as strong relationships with international media organizations which allows access to information around the world.

The channel was licensed in June 1993 and allocated a frequency on UHF (Channel 39). It began transmission two years later under the name, "Channels Television", and the first terrestrial broadcast was on 1 July 1995, with John Momoh reading the first news bulletin. Channels TV broadcasts to an audience of over 20 million people.

The channel was an affiliate of TVAfrica. In 2000, it wanted to broadcast UEFA Euro 2000, but it and other interested broadcasters in Nigeria faced legal issues from the Nigerian Broadcasting Commission over the legality of the network, which, according to the regulator, was not registered in Nigeria.

=== 2008 closure ===
In September 2008, Channels Television was shut down by President Yar'Adua, who sent Nigeria's State Security Service (SSS) to shut down the station and to arrest its senior staff due to channel's report of Yar'Adua's bad health. The report by Channels Television was attributed to information received from News Agency of Nigeria (NAN). Following the investigation, NAN announced that the channel did not issue any statement regarding the president stepping down, but instead, its computer was hacked into. In protest, Channels TV discontinued its use of the NAN wire service up to this date. It was proven that the e-mail received by Channels TV was a hoax sent from a computer in the Ivory Coast. Nigeria's Minister of Information, John Odey, told the BBC that the government was angered by the report.

== Production ==
Channels Television's team has produced feature programs, which have received commendation throughout the country. Video footage of events and happenings in Nigeria, shot by the Channels Television news crews have been used widely by broadcast organizations such as BBC, CNN and ITN. Its program News at Ten is one of the network's main news.

Since 2009, Channels Television organizes and hosts "Channels National Kids Cup", a sport event for school children from sixteen Nigerian states held in Teslim Balogun Stadium in Lagos. General Manager of Channels Television, Steve Judo, stated that Channels Television is socially responsible media and as such chose to engage in the development of football from the roots.

=== 2012 Nigerian bombing ===
In January 2012, journalist Enenche Akogwu, who worked as a correspondent in Kano for Channels Television, was shot and killed while reporting on coordinated attacks there claimed by the radical Islamist sect known as Boko Haram. According to his colleagues, Akogwu had shown up after a bombing and began filming a crowd gathered there without knowing they were armed sect members.

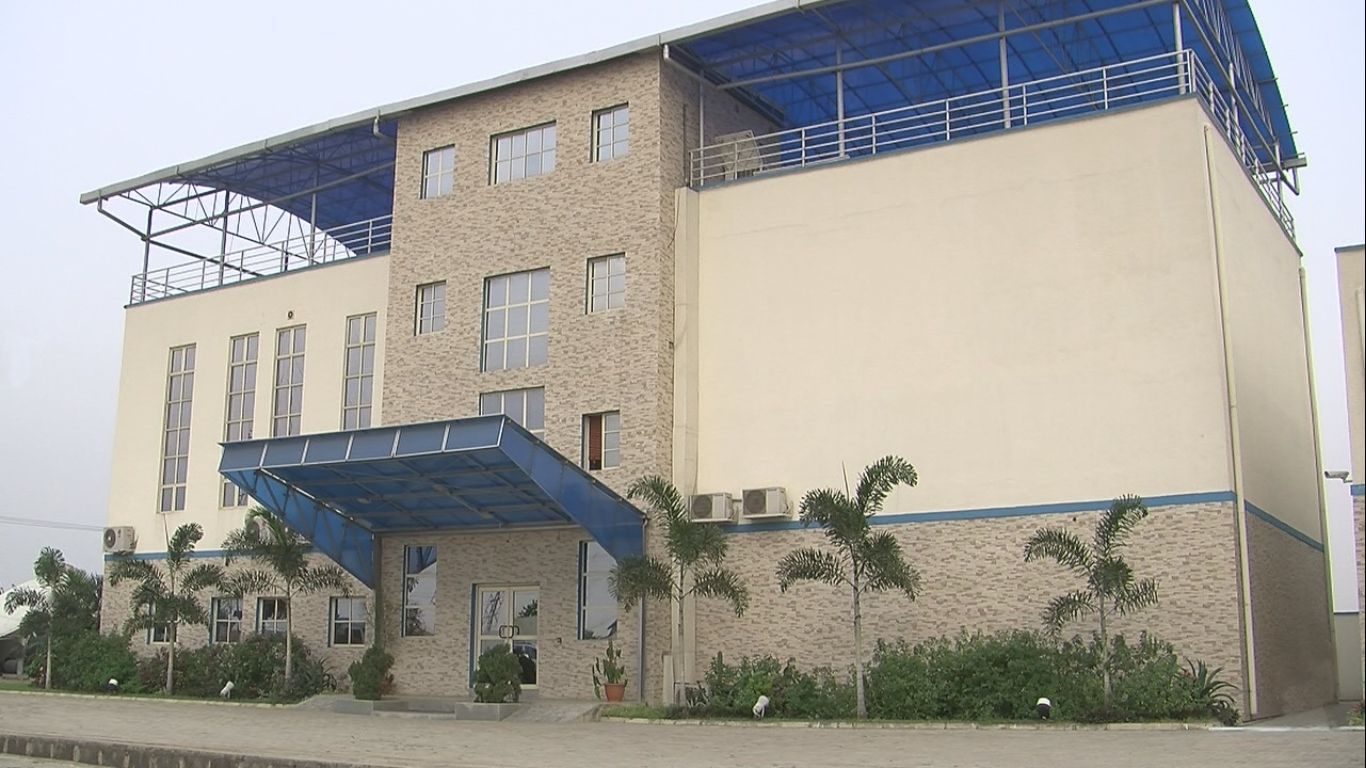
Channels TV headquarters

== Awards and recognition ==
- Named "Best Station of the Year" twelve times (2000, 2001, 2003, 2004, 2008, 2010, 2011, 2012, 2013, 2014, 2015 and 2016) by The Federal Republic of Nigeria's Media Merit Award Trust
- 2013: Awarded "Best TV Station in Africa" by African Achievers Awards, Achievers Media
- 2013: Named "Most Compliant Television Station In Media Category" by Advertising Practitioners Council of Nigeria
- 2013: Awarded Lagos State Ministry of Education's "Jam Feast" award for its contribution towards youth invention and educational development
- 2013: "Best Report On Maternal Health" by the Society of Gynaecology And Obstetrics Of Nigeria (SOGON)
- 2013: Customer Service Excellence Award in Media

== Partnership ==
in 2019, Channels TV launched Gist Nigeria, its first co-production with BBC with Wale Fakile and Ajoke Lijadu-Ulohotse as hosts.

On 22 March 2014, Tezuka Productions partnership with Channels TV to broadcast 8 episode spin-off series of Astro Boy, Little Astro Boy, which was aimed for preschoolers on Channels TV's children's block.

On Friday, 14 August 2015, Deutsche Welle said it had signed a partnership agreement with Channels TV to demonstrates the long tradition of airing a positive view of Africa. Peter Limbourg, the director-general of Deutsche Welle describe Channels TV as a great television station and a perfect partner for Deutsche Welle. Limbourg said "We at Deutsche Welle think that we have to report the great things that happen in Africa, especially in Nigeria.

John Momoh, the chief executive officer of Channels TV described the partnership as "Made from heaven". He said, "This is part of our strategy to tell the African story, especially that of Nigeria, from the African perspective so that we do not leave this key element of definition of who we are, what we do and why, to other people to tell on our behalf".

In August 2015, Channels TV signed a memorandum of understanding with the United Nations on news coverage. The United Nations was represented by Ban Ki-moon, the secretary-general of the United Nations.

== Programs ==
Program	Air days	Time	Presenters
Sunrise Daily	Weekdays	7 a.m.	Chamberlain Usoh; Maupe Ogun; Bukola Samuel-Wemimo; Kayode Okikiolu; Ayo Makinde
Sunrise Saturday	Saturdays	9 a.m.	Ayo Makinde; Alero Edu
Business Morning	Weekdays	10 a.m.	Ini John-Mekwa/Ladi Williams
Politics Today	Sundays	8 p.m.	Seun Okinbaloye
Sport This Morning	Weekdays	9 a.m.	Cecilia Omorogbe; Austin Okon-Akpan; Yemi Adebayo
Earthfile	Fridays	4.30 p.m.	Ayoola Kassim
Community Report	Fridays	12:30 p.m.	Dare Idowu
Channels Book Club	Tuesdays	3:30 p.m.	Olakunle Kasunmu
Diplomatic Channels	Mondays	8:30 p.m.	Amarachi Ubani
Network Africa	Mon-Fri	4.30 pm	Layo Olarinde
Law Weekly	Saturdays	3.30 p.m.	Shola Soyele
Diaspora Network	Saturdays	6.30 p.m.	Teniola Oyetayo
Tech Trends	Saturdays	5.30 p.m.	Olayemi Odunuga

== See also ==
- List of television stations in Nigeria
- List of news channels
- List of television networks by country
