= Siene Allwell-Brown =

Nigerian broadcaster and lawyer

Siene Allwell-Brown is a veteran Nigerian broadcaster and lawyer who was prominent in the 1970s and 1980s for her work on the Nigerian Television Authority (NTA).

== Early life and education ==
Allwell-Brown hails from Rivers State but was raised in Aba, Abia State, attended Aba township school Aba, Abia State and A.C.M Girls' school Elelenwa, Rivers State for her primary and secondary education respectively. She attained a degree in Law from Middlesex University, London in 1984. She then proceeded to the Nigerian Law School in 1985.

== Career ==
Allwell-Brown started out as a radio presenter at the Nigerian Broadcasting Corporation (NBC) on May 1, 1973 before moving on to present for the Nigerian Television Authority. She has also served as a general manager of external communications for the Nigeria Liquefied Natural Gas Limited and also a general manager of Rivers State Television.

== Personal life ==
Allwell-Brown was married to Razaq Lawal and later married Nim Tariah.
