= NTA Minna =

Television station in Niger State, Nigeria

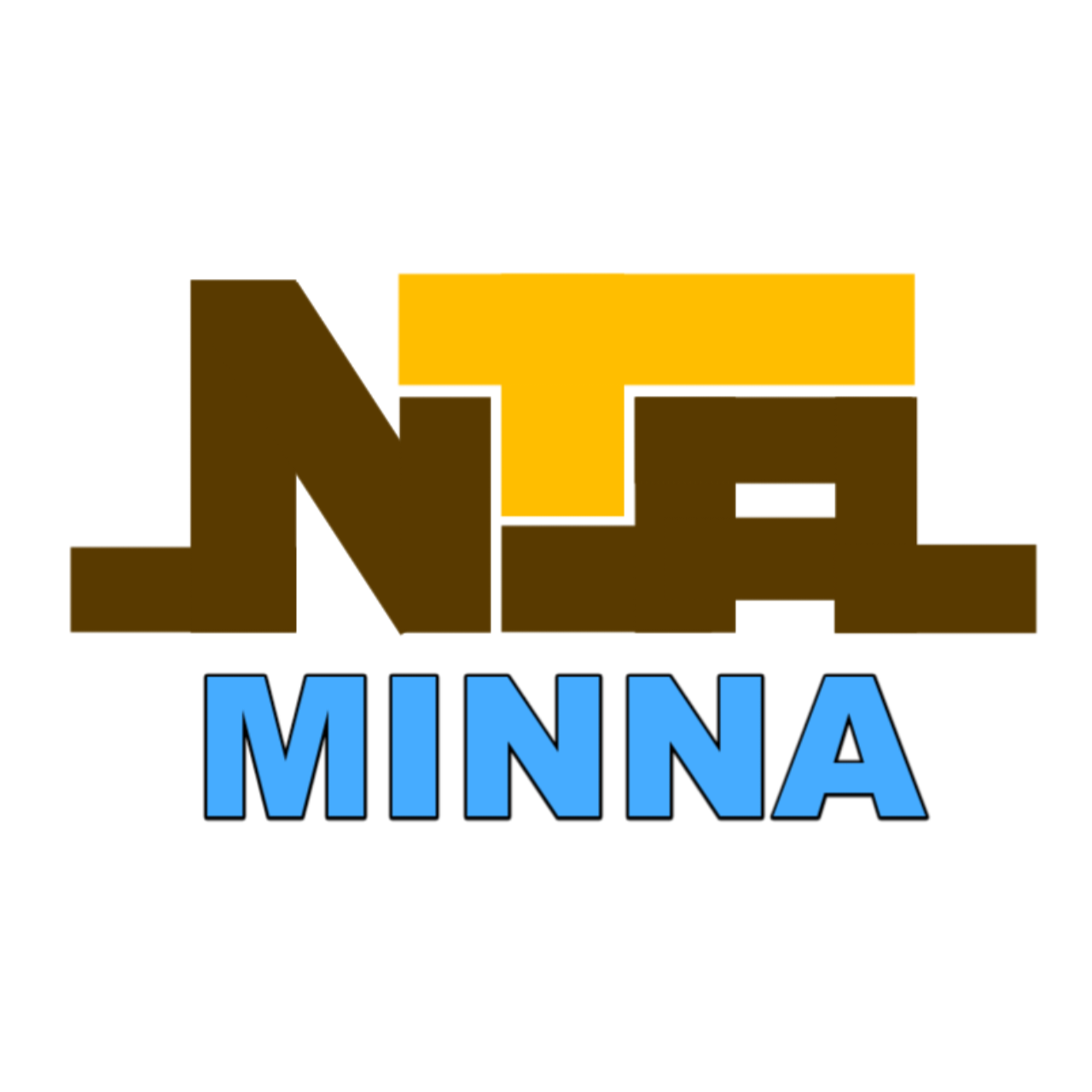
- Country: Nigeria
- Broadcast area: Niger State
- Headquarters: Minna, Nigeria

Ownership
- Owner: Nigerian Television Authority

History
- Launched: 1978

Availability

Terrestrial
- VHF: Channel 10 (Minna)

NTA Minna is the local unit of the Nigerian Television Authority in Minna, capital of the Niger State.

== History ==
Niger was formerly in the Northern Region. Since 1967, the state was divided further, accelerated by the creation of five new states by the Military Government in 1976. At the same time, the former television companies (WNTV, ENTV, Midwest TV, RKTV, BPTV) were merged, forming the Nigerian Television Authority.

NTA Minna was established in 1978. The idea was first initiated in 1977 by the NTA corporate headquarters which later came into fruition on 12 October 1978 from a temporary studio at exactly 5:00pm using a 1KW Siemens transmitter with manpower capacity of 74 with the name Nigerian Television Minna. Manpower was pooled from various existing stations to enable the station commence full blast transmission. NTA Minna was inserted in Zone F, led by Sokoto, which also included the station in Ilorin.

From the beginning, the station was able to link to the network by satellite.

The main station is on channel 10, with nearby relayers on channels 7 and 12.
