= NTA Kaduna =

NTA Kaduna is a regional branch of the Nigerian Television Authority headquartered in Kaduna, capital of the Kaduna State eponymous state. Its origins date back to the former BCNN, which eventually became Radio Kaduna Television.

== History ==
The government of the Northern Region, owner of the Broadcasting Corporation of Northern Nigeria (BCNN), negotiated in 1961 with two British companies (the Granada group and EMI). Together, they would "provide television to the three main centres: Kano, the Commercial Centre of the North; Kaduna, the Capital of Northern Nigeria; and Zaria, the academic Centre of the North".

Radio Kaduna Television (RKTV) began broadcasting on 15 March 1962 on VHF channel 4 using a temporary studio at the Independence Hall of Government College, Kaduna, in an attempt from the regional government to start ahead of deadline. In August 1962, it started broadcasting to Zaria (channel 4) and in February 1963, to Kano (channel 10). In the same month, RKTV moved to new, permanent facilities at No. 7 Hospital Road, from where it broadcast three hours a day, six days a week. One third of RKTV's programmes were produced locally, in both English and Hausa languages. At the time, RKTV had the most advanced television infrastructure in Nigeria, coupled with a high number of potential viewers, as the region alone had a population of 30 million. Out of all the television stations that existed in Nigeria at the time, it was the only one that had favorable relations to the government, without breaking contracts.

RKTV was the first station in Nigeria to air the British sci-fi series Doctor Who on 3 August 1965, also the first television station in Africa overall. During this period, the station broadcast on average four hours a day, starting at 6:30pm with a reading of the Quran and ending at approximately 10:30pm after the late news. By the early 1970s, it was broadcasting from 5pm to 12:15am daily.

With the creation of the new Nigerian Television Authority, following the increase in states, Kaduna was put under zone D, in central-northern Nigeria, also supervising NTA Kano and NTA Jos. NTA Kano was formerly under the jurisdiction of RKTV and subsequently became its own station. NTA Kaduna's coverage area has since been reduced to the state of Kaduna alone.
