= Cyril Stober =

Nigerian journalist

- Born: 19 March 1959 (age 67); Niger state, Nigeria
- Occupations: NTA network, Newscaster, journalist

Cyril Stober (born 19 March 1959) is a Nigerian journalist and newscaster. He was born in Niger State. He attended Fatima Secondary Secondary (now known as, Father O'Connell Science College, Minna).

== Career ==
Stober spent over three decades of professional career as a newscaster and journalist. His major role was anchoring the news at 9 pm on NTA network and NTA prime time news. His signature dressing was a native attire, cap and his glasses. In 2015, there was a rumor that he had retired, he surprised viewers as he was seen anchoring the news again. On 21 April 2019, Stober retired from Nigerian Broadcasting Authority after 35 years of service. Cyril Stober still anchors regular NTA network programming after his retirement as he is more of a Nigerian icon.

== Personal life ==
Stober was married to Efun Merriman-Johnson, an ex-broadcaster who also worked in the Nigerian Television Authority until their divorce. On 13 January 2019, Stober married Elizabeth Banu in her hometown Garkida, Adamawa state, Nigeria. He has three children (two daughters and a son) from his marriage to Efun Merriman-Johnson. His new wife is also a newscaster with the NTA, another broadcaster with Nigeria Television Authority, Abuja. He was ordained a knight of the Methodist Church, Nigeria.
