= NTA Lagos =

- Country: Nigeria
- Broadcast area: Lagos State
- Headquarters: Lagos, Nigeria

Programming
- Languages: English, Yoruba

Ownership
- Owner: Nigerian Television Authority
- Sister channels: NTA2

History
- Launched: 1 April 1962
- Former names: Nigerian Television Service (1962-1967); NBC-TV (1967-1977)

Availability

Terrestrial
- VHF: Channel 10 (Lagos)

NTA Lagos is a Zonal Network Centre of the Nigerian Television Authority in Lagos, Nigeria's largest city. It was established in 1962 as the first station under the federal government - all other television stations in Nigeria were set up under the individual state governments. NTA Lagos is one out of two centres that have two television stations, the NTA centre in Abuja, the federal capital, is the only other centre with such a structure.

== History ==
The Nigerian government set up the Nigerian Television Service (NTS) on 1 April 1962, the date of its first broadcast, becoming the fourth station in Nigeria overall, and the first to broadcast at a sub-regional level. Lagos did not become its own state until 1967. Similar to the other stations of the initial four, the federal government gave a five-year subcontracting agreement with NBC's international arm. An advertisement was published selecting staff members shortlisted from over ten thousand applications, including "one from a young man who hoped they would teach him how to be a tripod".

In 1963, federal government mandated the Nigerian Broadcasting Corporation (forerunner of the FRCN) to take control of the operations of the station once the contract with NBC International expired in 1967. The station was subsequently renamed NBC Television.

From its beginning, NTS was faced with a number of difficulties. It had one small studio (18 by 36 feet) and lacked adequate broadcasting equipment (launching with a daily one-hour schedule). The line-up consisted of local live shows, foreign films, newsreels and educational programming catered to be seen in schools.

Coverage was limited to Lagos, the smallest out of the initial stations, in opposition to WNTV's wider coverage, but its commercial activities were "rewarding". Subsequently, NTS/NBC had its signal seen in the entire Western Region.

With the establishment of the Nigerian Television Authority in 1977, Lagos became the headquarters of the network. The existing station was renamed NTA Lagos as a result. The measure was provisional as a move to Abuja was under the cards, as the city was still under construction at the time.

In the early 1980s, NTA Lagos installed a new transmitter in Tejuoso to improve its reception. This became NTA Ikeja, which eventually shut down in 2000. 78% of the output was local. Signal overspill led to NTA Lagos being received in the states of Oyo, Kwara, Ondo, Bendel and Ogan, as well as the countries of Togo, Benin and Cameroon. At the time of being NTA's headquarters, it had the reputation for having the best staff, equipment and most powerful transmitters.
