= Ralph Uwazuruike =

Nigerian activist

- Born: Imo State, Nigeria
- Occupation: Lawyer
- Known for: Activism
- Spouse: Ngozi Omekadiya Uwazuruike
- Children: Confidence Uwazuruike; Allwell Uwazuruike

Ralph Uwazuruike is a Nigerian activist. He is the leader of the Movement for the Actualization of the Sovereign State of Biafra (MASSOB); a group canvassing for the secession and sovereignty of Eastern Nigeria. He holds degrees in Political Science from Punjab University, India, and Law from Bombay University, India. Uwazuruike adopts the principle of nonviolence as propagated by Mahatma Gandhi and Martin Luther King Jr., as the philosophy of the struggle. He has been detained several times and charged with treason in Nigerian courts. On 28 April 2010, he was visited in prison by Chukwuemeka Odimegwu Ojukwu and his wife, Bianca.

Following Ojukwu's death in 2011, Uwazuruike was named his successor and crowned 'Ezeigbo'. He has since embarked on several regional projects including the erection of a library in honour of Ojukwu and building residential houses for displaced Biafran War veterans.

Uwazuruike condemns the killing of Igbos in northern states of the country by the Boko Haram group and continually calls on Igbos to return home in order to avoid the massacre. He was arrested by the Nigerian police force, on February 8, 2001 and was charged with disturbance and the unauthorized use of firearms alongside nine other people.

== Early life and education ==
Ralph Uwazuruike was born in Okwe, Imo State. Having experienced the horror of the Biafran war as a kid, Uwazuruike nursed hopes of resuscitating the defunct republic albeit through peaceful means. He was particularly enthralled, in his school days, by books on Mahatma Gandhi which influenced his decision to study in India. Uwazuruike studied Political Science at Panjab University, and then Law at Bombay University, India, after which he enrolled at the Nigerian Law School. He was called to the Nigerian Bar in 1991.

== MASSOB ==
Uwazuruike founded MASSOB in 1999, in the aftermath of the Nigerian elections that produced President Olusegun Obasanjo. The group kicked off at Uwazuruike's Temple of Peace residence in Lagos and recorded a high rise in membership in its first few weeks.

== Legal issues ==
Irked by MASSOB's growing popularity, the Nigerian government began clampdowns on the group. Uwazuruike was arrested on several occasions on charges of unlawful gathering and disturbance of public peace. He was often eventually released within a few weeks. On one occasion, he was arrested in Lome, Togo, for storming the 36th Organisation of African Unity (OAU) Summit which had in attendance several African Heads-of-State.

Uwazuruike's longest spell in detention was to come in 2005 when he was arrested in his Okwe hometown by men of the Nigerian Police. He alleges to have been flown to Abuja aboard a private jet and remanded in an underground SSS facility. He remained in prison detention for two years after a protracted bail hearing at the Federal High Court, Abuja. Justice Binta Nyako eventually granted him three-month bail to enable him bury his mother who had died during his incarceration.

In 2011, Uwazuruike and 280 MASSOB members were arrested in Enugu at an event in honour of Ojukwu. He was released on orders of Nigerian President, Goodluck Jonathan.

In 2005 Uwazuruike was charged with treason at the Federal High Court, Abuja, before Justice Binta Nyako. The then Attorney-General of the Federation, Bayo Ojo, SAN, appeared in person for the government while Mike Ahamba, SAN, represented the defendant before being replaced by Festus Keyamo. The case however did not proceed to the trial stage as the first two years were spent hearing Uwazuruike's bail application. He was finally granted bail in November 2007. In April 2013, the Supreme Court held that the trial could commence after rejecting contrary submissions by Festus Keyamo.
