= Allwell Uwazuruike =

Nigerian academic and author

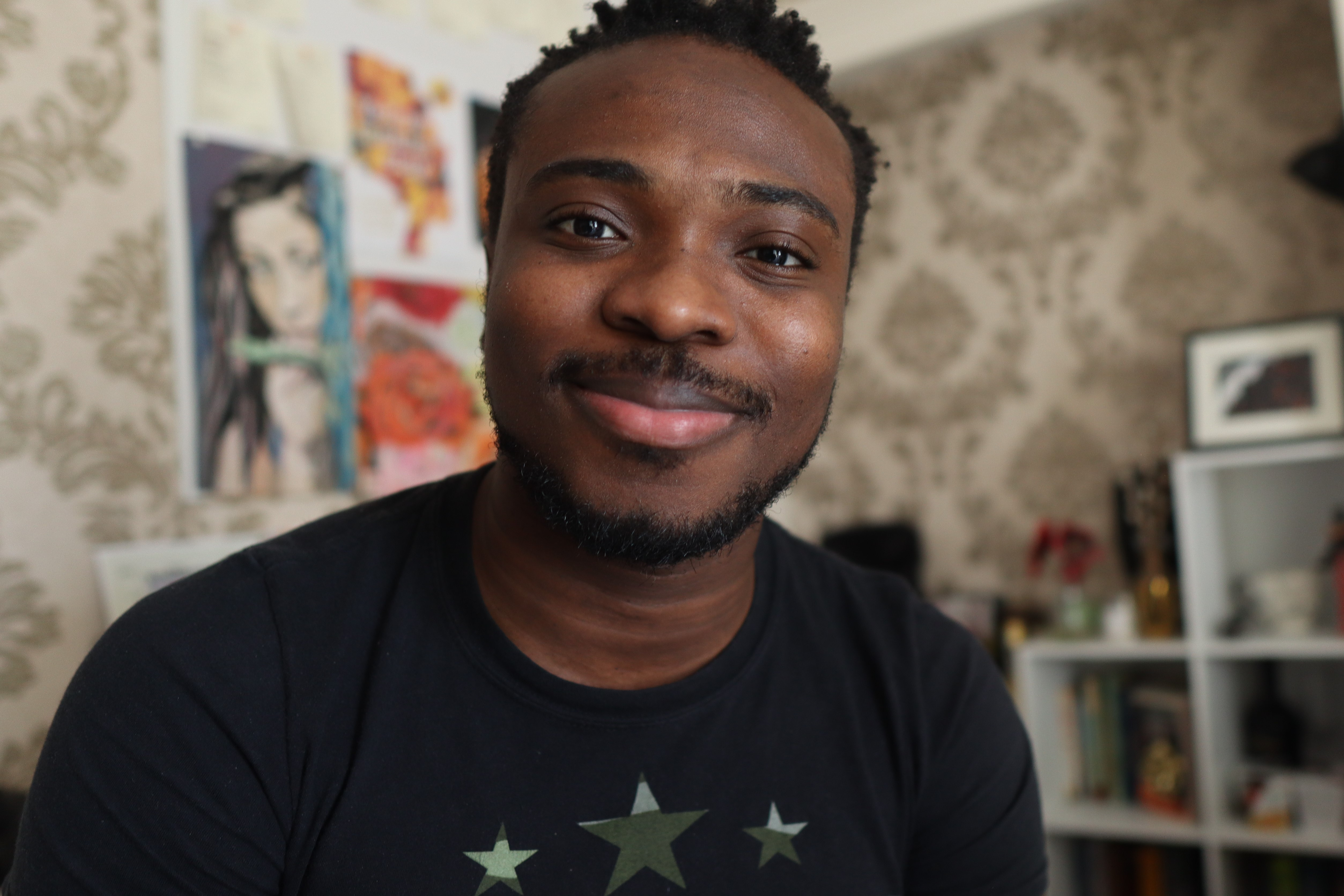
- Education: University of Central Lancashire
- Occupation: Author
- Notable work: Human Rights under the African Charter, Yellow Means Stay: An Anthology of Love Stories from Africa

Allwell Uwazuruike is an academic and author. In 2018, he co-founded Afritondo.

== Early life and education ==
Allwell Uwazuruike is one of four children of Ralph Uwazuruike, the founder of the Movement for the Actualisation of the Sovereign State of Biafra. He studied law at Imo State University, Owerri, Nigeria, and was called to the Nigerian Bar in 2010.

== Writings ==
Uwazuruike has published books and journal articles on human rights in Africa.

== Books ==
Human Rights under the African Charter Published in 2020 by Palgrave Macmillan.

Yellow Means Stay: An Anthology of Love Stories from Africa Uwazuruike was one of three editors of the collection published in 2020 by Afritondo.

The Dogs and the Baboons Published in 2022 by Afritondo.
