= NTA Yola =

- Country: Nigeria
- Broadcast area: Adamawa State
- Headquarters: Yola, Nigeria

Programming
- Languages: English, Hausa

Ownership
- Owner: Nigerian Television Authority

History
- Launched: 1978

Availability

Terrestrial
- VHF: Channel 8 (Yola)

NTA Yola is the local branch of the Nigerian Television Authority in Yola, capital of the state of Ademawa.

== History ==
The Nigerian Television Authority was created following the 1976 territorial reforms. Due to the vastness of the country, the NTA established six zones, which supervised three or four local stations. Yola was in zone E, which encompassed north-eastern Nigeria.

NTA Yola (initially NTV-Yola) began broadcasting test transmissions on VHF channel 8 in June 1978 (NTA Yola still broadcasts on this frequency), five hours a day on weekdays and seven on weekends. At the time, Yola was part of the former state of Gongola, of which Yola was its capital. Coverage was limited to the areas of Yola and nearby Jimeta. The station relied primarily on programming from sister stations in Bauchi, Jos and Makurdi.

In January 1979, A. A. Tafida was appointed its first director of programmes. By mid-1979, NTA Yola had started its regular broadcasts. Some sources believe that the station went regular in October 1979.

By 1983, NTA Yola had new studios, new transmitters and the ability to produce its own programs both locally and nationally. From then to 1991, Timawus Mathias was its general manager, after that, he left NTA to start his own media business.

In the mid-1990s, NTA Yola also covered news in Taraba State.

Aside from the main station on channel 8, NTA Yola also has relay stations on channels 5 and 11.
