= NTA Jos =

- Country: Nigeria
- Broadcast area: Plateau State
- Headquarters: Jos, Nigeria

Programming
- Languages: English, Hausa

Ownership
- Owner: Nigerian Television Authority

History
- Launched: 15 July 1974
- Replaced: Radio Kaduna Television relay station
- Former names: Benue Plateau Television (1974-1977)

Availability

Terrestrial
- VHF: Channel 7 (Jos)

NTA Jos is a unit of the Nigerian Television Authority seated in Jos, capital of the Plateau State. It was established as Benue-Plateau Television (BPTV) in 1974, shortly before being integrated into the new NTA network in 1977. NTA Jos also operates the NTA Television College.

== History ==
Jos was formerly in the Northern Region inherited from colonial rule, and received signals from Radio Kaduna Television in Kaduna, which was the regional capital.

Following the creation of new states, work started for a television station in Jos in 1973, which was for the then-upcoming Benue Plateau Television. The construction of the facilities started in the second half of the year. The station started broadcasting on 15 July 1974 on channel 7, replacing the RKTV relay. The Benue Plateau Broadcasting Corporation was created the following year to supervise BPTV and the radio service, BPTV was subsequently officially inaugurated on 25 February 1975. On 1 October 1975, on the fifteenth anniversary of Nigeria's independence, BPTV started colour broadcasting. It was the first such regular service in Africa, employing the PAL format.

The takeover of Nigeria by a new Federal Military Government in 1977 reorganized all of the existing television stations and incorporated them to the current Nigerian Television Authority. Jos was integrated into Zone D, encompassing central-northern Nigeria, which also included Kano and Kaduna. NTA Jos also sent its programming to nearby stations, NTA Yola and NTA Makurdi. NTA Makurdi was created out of a former BPTV relayer.

In 1980, NTA set up a television college in Jos.

By the early 1980s, NTA Jos had its own functional "color processing, developing, and printing plant" in its studios, and its local programmes were "well produced".

In February 2008, it was announced that NTA Jos was set to become a Zonal Network Centre, with the ability of producing programmes nationwide.

On 4 February 2015, parts of the NTA Jos building were hit by a fire at 3pm. The fire was contained within thirty minutes.
