= Lagos Television =

State-owned television station in Nigeria

- The building of Lagos Television Media House, Ikeja, Lagos State
- 1 (Plot 1) Lateef Jakande Road, Agidingbi, Ikeja, Lagos State.; Nigeria
- City: Lagos
- Channels: Digital: 35 (UHF)
- Branding: LTV Channel 35 UHF

Ownership
- Owner: Lagos State

History
- Founded: 1980
- First air date: November 9, 1980.

Technical information
- ERP: 30 kW
- Transmitter coordinates: 4°49′46″N 7°4′31″E

Links
- Website: www.lagostelevision.com

Lagos television news casting

Lagos Television (abbreviated LTV), or Lagos Weekend Television (abbreviated LWT, UHF channel 35, also known as LTV 8) It is a state owned television station in Ikeja, Lagos, Nigeria. Lagos State Television was established In October, 1980 under the administration of Alhaji Lateef Jakande to disseminate information and entertain the populace. It started operations on November 9, 1980, thereby providing quality television broadcasting and promoting cultural values. it became the second television station to be founded by a state government only preceded by Broadcasting Corporation of Oyo State (BCOS). It began broadcasting on November 9 of that year and was the first Television station in Nigeria to operate on two frequencies / bands VHF and UHF. Now on UHF channel 35, it was the first state owned Television station on cable satellite DSTV channel 256, GoTV channel 120 and Startimes channel 113.

The objective of Lagos Television was to allow the state administration to disseminate information and entertain the general public and the link between the government and the populace.

STRUCTURE OF LAGOS TELEVISION

- GENERAL MANAGER
- DIRECTORATES
  - Admin & Human Resources
  - Finance & Accounts
  - Engineering
  - News
  - Current Affairs
  - Programes.
  - Content control and operations
  - Corporate Affairs
  - Production Services
  - Facility other unit

EXTRA BROADCAST REVENUE ACTIVITIES

- Rental facilities
  - Combo hall
  - BOS Hall
  - The Blue Roof

== History ==
Lagos Televsion, upon its start in 1980, faced a dispute with the Nigerian Television Authority over the use of a potential frequency. Ultimately LTV gained channel 8, while NTA2 gained channel 5.

Under military rule, Lagos television was moved to UHF channel 35.

In September 1985, a mysterious fire destroyed the entire station; its studio, library as well as official records was damaged.
