= NTA Enugu =

Public television broadcaster in Enugu, Nigeria

NTA Enugu is a television station under the Nigerian Television Authority network, located in Enugu, the capital of Enugu State. It was established post-Nigerian Civil War as the successor to the Eastern Nigeria Television (ENTV). As a pioneer in Nigerian broadcasting, ENTV's slogan was "Second to None," reflecting its status following the first station, Western Nigeria Television (WNTV).

== History ==
NTA Enugu began its journey as ENTV, a pioneering television service initiated by the government of the Eastern Region. ENTV began broadcasting on the day Nigeria declared independence, marking a notable moment in the country's media history. The regional government's partnership with foreign companies facilitated the creation of a service that quickly became the most prosperous station in Nigeria due to its strategic location and commercial influence.

The station's initial broadcasts were limited to Enugu but soon extended to Aba and Port Harcourt, significantly increasing its viewership. By 1964, ENTV had expanded its reach across the Eastern Region and beyond, with overspill into neighboring countries, thanks to the installation of powerful transmitters, the highest in West Africa at the time.

However, the outbreak of the Nigerian Civil War in 1966 brought challenges, with ENTV suffering damage and disruptions. Enugu's role as the capital of Biafra further complicated the station's operations. Despite these difficulties, ENTV resumed broadcasting after the war's end in 1970, under the new name NTA Enugu, as part of the Nigerian Television Authority network. The subsequent administrative changes and the creation of new states led to the establishment of separate stations, reducing NTA Enugu's coverage area.
