= Nigerian Television Authority =

Nigerian government-owned partly commercial broadcaster

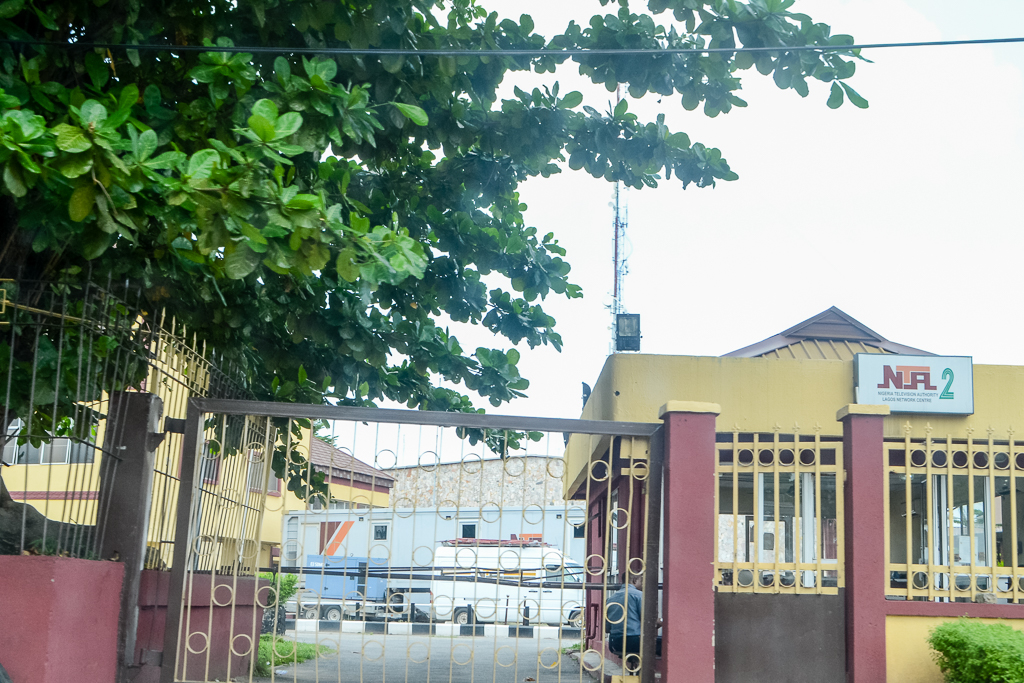
- Type: Broadcast network
- Country: Nigeria
- Availability: Nationwide
- Motto: "You can't beat the reach", "First in Africa"
- Headquarters: Abuja
- Broadcast area: Nationwide
- Nation: Nigeria
- Owner: Government of Nigeria
- Established: 1959; WNTV; 1977; NTA

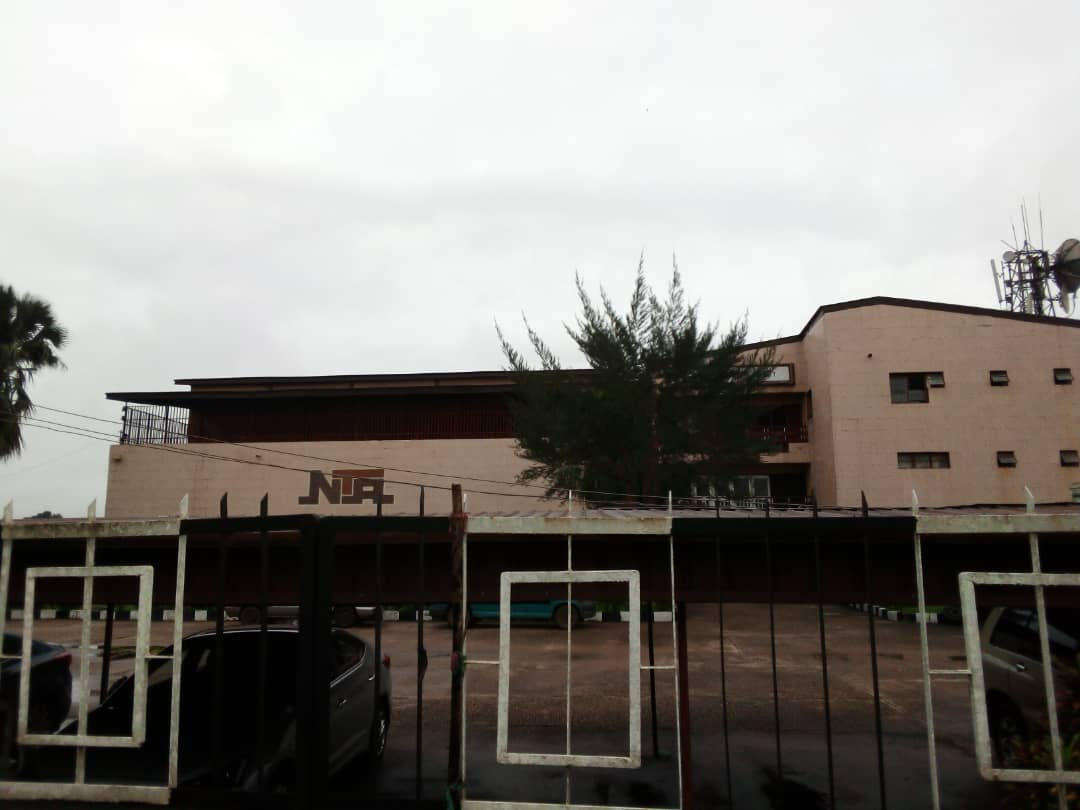
Nigerian Television Authority, Benin Office

The Nigerian Television Authority or NTA is a Nigerian government-owned and partly commercial broadcast station. Originally known as Nigerian Television (NTV), it was inaugurated in 1977 with a monopoly on national television broadcasting, after a takeover of regional television stations by military governmental authorities in 1976. After a declining interest from the public in government-influenced programming, it lost its monopoly over television broadcasting in Nigeria in the 1990s.

The NTA runs the largest television network in Nigeria with stations in several parts of the country. It is widely viewed as the "authentic voice" of the Nigerian government.

== History ==
=== Early broadcast stations in Nigeria ===
The first television station in Nigeria, the Western Nigerian Government Broadcasting Corporation (WNTV) began broadcasting on 31 October 1959. Its first chairman was Olapade Obisesan, a lawyer trained in the United Kingdom and the son of Akinpelu Obisesan, an Ibadan socialite and first president of the Cooperative Bank of Nigeria. Vincent Maduka, a former engineer, was the General Manager. The station was based in Ibadan, making it the first broadcast station in tropical Africa.

In March 1962, Radio-Television Kaduna/Radio Kaduna Television (RKTV) was established. It was based in Kaduna and was operated by the Broadcasting Company of Northern Nigeria. RKTV also provided coverage for the central northern states; it opened new stations on Zaria in July 1962 and on Kano in February 1963. Later in 1977, it was re-branded NTV-Kaduna.

In April 1962, the Nigerian Broadcasting Corporation (NBC) was established as a federal government-owned service based in the city of Lagos, broadcasting to the southwestern states.

MidWest TV was established in 1972 as a TV broadcaster of Port Harcourt. It was run by the state government in Benin.

Benue-Plateau Television Corporation (BPTV) was established in 1974 with headquarters in Jos. It was the first television station to launch regular/permanent colour broadcasts in Africa. The colour test transmissions began on 1 October 1975. BPTV was later re-branded as NTV-Jos.

NTA was founded in 1977. By May 1977 all the state television broadcasters listed above were merged and re-branded as Nigerian Television (NTV) and owned by the Nigerian Television Authority. Obisesan and Makuda continued in the roles of chairman and General Manager of NTA. As of 1979, NTA had a national reach of 20% of the Nigerian population.

=== Early programming ===
==== 1977–1990: Networking locally produced content ====
Dramatic programming such as serials and anthology series were rare in regional television stations before NTA was founded in 1977. TV shows such as Moses Olaiya's Alawada on WNTV (later NTA Ibadan), Village Headmaster and Hotel de Jordan on NTA Benin became available more widely after the merger. Apart from these few notable shows, there was little original content in dramatic series production during the 1970s. By 1980, when the new NTA network took over state-owned broadcasting stations in the country, there was a concerted effort to increase the quality of locally produced content. NTA began offering support to the production of notable country-wide network programs such as Tales by Moonlight, Cockcrow at Dawn, and Mirror in the Sun as early as 1977. In 1982, a drama produced by NTA Sokoto, Moment of Truth won a prize at the fifth URTNA festival held in Algiers.

To cultivate interest in original broadcast content from Nigerian producers, the network set a ceiling of 20% broadcasting time to be allocated to foreign programming, during a period when the cost of acquiring those programs was much less than the locally produced ones. With just a portion of the broadcast week for schedulers to work with, foreign imports were routinely some of the most popular shows from the UK and the U.S., such as Yes Minister, Charlie's Angels, Dallas, Dynasty, and Falcon Crest. Cockcrow at Dawn, an agriculture promotional drama partially sponsored by UBA and produced by Peter Igho, who directed the award-winning Moment of Truth, emerged as one of the first nationally televised drama series in Nigeria. However, it was short-lived due to "government structure syndrome". Acada Campus, a show produced by Bode Sowande, was also short-lived. These series were widely available thanks to NTA's monopoly on broadcasting.

In the 1980s, a series of critically acclaimed soap operas were promoted on the network. The first was Laolu Ogunniyi's Wind Against My Soul, followed by For Better or Worse and Lola Fani Kayode's Mirror in the Sun. The last of these, produced in 1983, was well received by critics, but its broadcast was interrupted after two years due to a lack of financial support. In the mid-1980s, another group of soap operas dominated the airwaves, including the short-lived Behind the Clouds and Turning Wheels.

In 1984, NTA began to broadcast Tales by Moonlight, a children's programme narrating traditional African folklore stories. The network also broadcast Adelia Onyedibia's adaptation of Chinua Achebe's Things Fall Apart in 1986.

The network also promoted notable comedy series during this period such as New Masquerade and Ken Saro Wiwa's Basi and Company. One of the earliest network comedies was House no. 13 (1984), a sitcom satirizing the social and urban lifestyle of Nigerians, starring Wale Ogunyemi. Basi and Company, a critically acclaimed comedy series starring Albert Egbe was broadcast in 1985. Village Headmaster, Koko Close and Samanja, three series spoken in Nigerian Pidgin, were aired nationwide.

==== 1990s: Partial commercialization ====
Under the structural adjustment program initiated by the government of Ibrahim Babangida, NTA was required to commercialize some of its time slots in an attempt to move away from public broadcasting towards a partially commercial broadcasting network. This led to the addition of sponsored and brokered religious programs and the live transmission of weddings and funeral services on the network.

NTA also continued to show acclaimed soap operas such as Mind Bending by Lola Fani-Kayode, Ripples by Zeb Ejiro and Checkmate by Amaka Igwe. Ripples, which began in 1988, became the network's longest-running soap opera, ending in 1993. Checkmate by Amaka Igwe, starring Richard Mofe Damijo, Bob-Manuel Udokwu, Ego Boyo, Kunle Bamtefa and Mildred Iweka, launched the career of many Nigerian celebrities. Following the end of Ripples and Checkmate, NTA promoted the shows Blossom and Fortunes, but these series suffered from declining viewership. At this time NTA, which previously had a broadcast monopoly, faced competition from new entrants such as Africa Independent Television. To compete, the network introduced prime time Latin American telenovelas such as The Rich Also Cry, Secrets of the Sand and Wild Rose.

Programming for children or for education usually occurred between 06:30 pm and 07:00 pm. Shows included Fun time, Readers club, Work it Out, and Take a Step.

In 1999, the network introduced breakfast television with A.M. Express.

=== News ===
News programming was central to NTA's and the government's efforts to forge national unity. The network ensured that news presenters did not simply read prepared scripts but acted as part of the news gathering team. As many of their early news writers came from print journalism, NTA made sure that writers understood the importance of writing for visual presentation. NTA introduced a new line of newscasters and reporters such as Ronke Ayuba, John Momoh, Cyril Stober, Bimbo Oloyede, Ruth Opia, Sienne Allwell-Brown and Sola Omole. Specialized news programmes like Frank Olise's Newsline were also introduced. The major news programmes were the Network News at Nine, a 5-minute News in Brief at 5:00 pm, and a 15-minute Newscap at 11:00 pm.

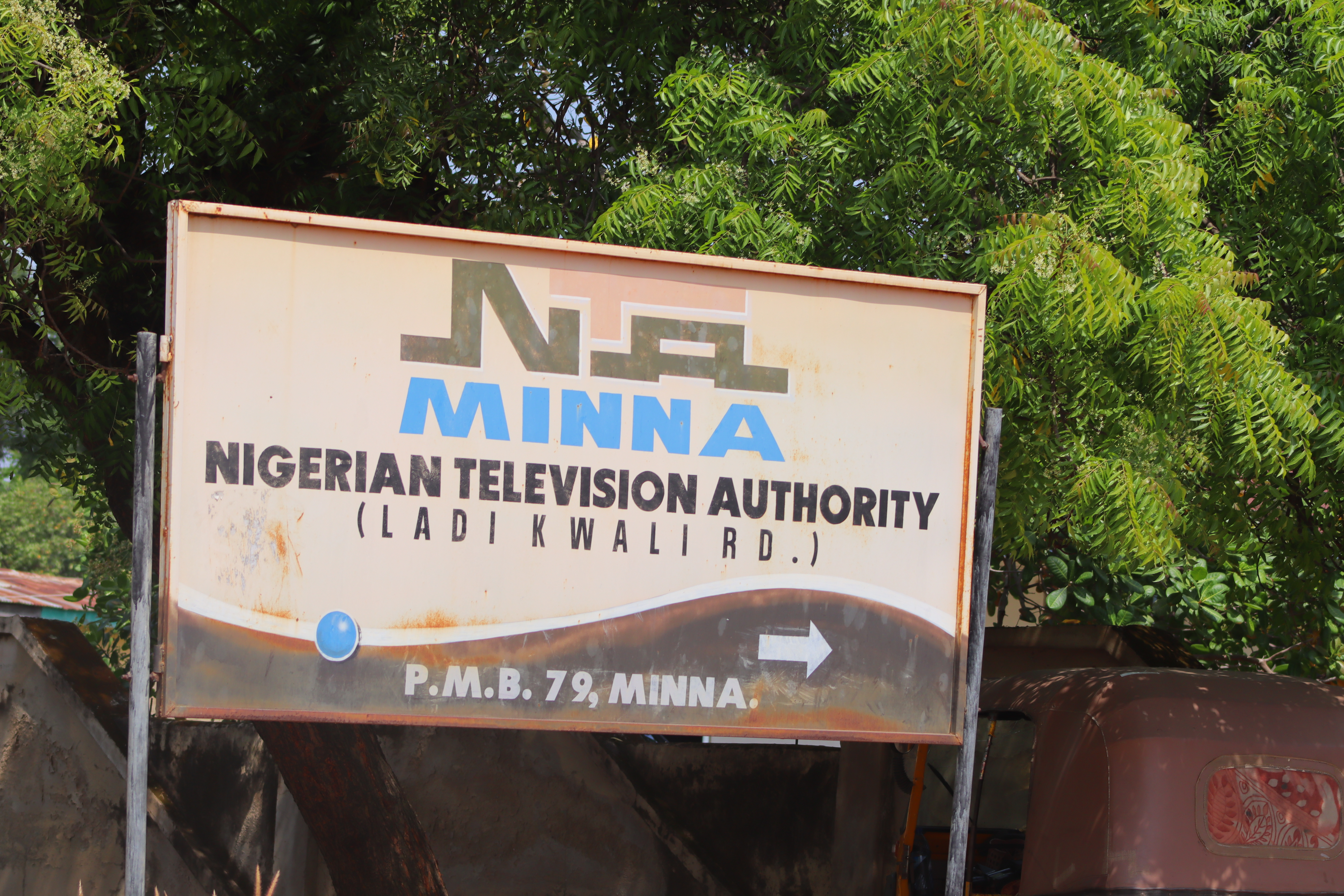
NTA Minna

In the 1990s, NTA joined other state-owned stations in commercialising some aspects of news reporting by including festivals, social events, cultural and business activities in the news or as part of a news programme in return for the payment of a fee.

== 21st Century programming ==
As of 2013, mandatory network programming dominated the airtime of most local NTA stations. The local stations were offered a choice of a local broadcasting time from a specific time range.

During the daytime, magazine shows like A.M. Express, later renamed Good Morning Nigeria, aired for 2½ hours from 6:30 am to 9:00 am and from Monday to Friday, but other programs air once or twice every week. Network dramas like Super Story and Stand Up Nigeria were usually broadcast in the Tuesday and Thursday 8:00 pm slot. Notable sports programs include On the Pitch on Mondays.

NTA, which previously had some original children's programming, formed a partnership with Viacom to broadcast Nickelodeon's programmes during its 5-7 pm time slot for children and instructional television in 2013, the agreement also included content provided by MTV Base.

NTA also receives support from China, including the possibility of co-productions with Chinese state TV. Less frequently, its channels air content donated by Japan's JICA.

=== Network News ===
NTA's news mostly reports on government activities. The major news production is Network News, an hour-long news programme that airs from 9:00 pm Monday-Friday except on Wednesdays, when it is replaced with News Extra. Network News usually starts with news from the presidency, then news from the National Assembly, followed by ministries and state governments. Other news productions include News at 7 and Nationwide News at 4 pm. Investigative reporting and human stories are usually subordinate to covering government activities, with the exception of Newsline which airs on Sunday evenings. The 9 pm news programme has one of the network's highest advertising rates for 30-second ads. Paid news segments such as 'News of Special Interest' are inserted into network broadcast news such as Newsline or the 9 pm network news.

Other notable news productions include Panorama, One O' Clock Live, Inside the Senate, and You and Your Rep.

=== Imported Programmes ===
==== Former ====
Animated

- The Adventures of Teddy Ruxpin
- The Adventures of the Little Prince
- Atom Ant
- Battle of the Planets
- The Bear, The Tiger and the Others
- Bertha
- Biker Mice from Mars
- Birdman and the Galaxy Trio
- Bright Sparks
- Captain Planet and the Planeteers
- Casper the Friendly Ghost
- Danger Mouse
- Dennis the Menace
- Dino-Riders
- DoDo, The Kid from Outer Space
- Dungeons & Dragons
- Fables of the Green Forest
- Groovie Goolies
- G-Force: Guardians of Space
- Harlem Globetrotters
- He-Man and the Masters of the Universe
- The Incredible Hulk
- Inspector Gadget
- Jimbo and the Jet-Set
- The Incredible Hulk
- Johnny Bravo
- King Rollo
- Little Wizards
- The Magic School Bus
- Muppet Babies
- The New Shmoo
- Ovide and the Gang
- Pigeon Street
- Pingu
- Pinky and the Brain
- Samurai Jack
- Samurai X
- Secret Squirrel
- SilverHawks
- Speed Racer
- Sport Billy
- SuperTed
- Teenage Mutant Ninja Turtles
- ThunderCats
- Thundersub
- Tom and Jerry
- Towser
- Victor & Hugo: Bunglers in Crime
- Voltron: Defender of the Universe

Children's Programmes

- 3-2-1 Contact
- Animal Kwackers
- The ChuckleHounds
- Fraggle Rock
- Power Rangers
- Rentaghost
- Sesame Street
- Terrahawks
- The Waterville Gang

Drama

- Charlie's Angels
- Doctor Who
- Tour of Duty

Comedy

- Mind Your Language
- The Muppet Show
- Sledge Hammer!
- Some Mothers Do 'Ave 'Em

Sports

- Telematch

== NTA branches and network centres ==
As of 2014, NTA had 101 stations in state capitals and towns of Nigeria, nine of which are network centres. These Network Centres can be found all over the various states of Nigeria.

Region	Channel	Established	Channel	Notes
Aba, Abia	NTA Aba	1964	6	Network Centre
Abakaliki	NTA Abakaliki	2000	43	Network Centre
Abeokuta	NTA Abeokuta	1979	12	Network Centre
Abuja	NTA Abuja	1982	5	Network Centre
Abuja	NTA Plus		21	Network Centre
Ado-Ekiti	NTA Ado-Ekiti	2003	5	Network Centre
Akure	NTA Akure	1979	11	Network Centre
Akwanga	NTA Akwanga			Network Centre
Amukpe, Sapele	NTA Amukpe-Sapele		32	Network Centre
Ankpa	NTA Ankpa			Community Station
Anyigba	NTA Anyigba			Community Station
Argungu	NTA Argungu		32	Community Station
Asaba	NTA Asaba	2003	11	Network Centre
Auchi	NTA Auchi			Network Centre
Awka	NTA Awka		5	Network Centre
Azare	NTA Azare		6	Community Station
Bauchi	NTA Bauchi	1977	9	Network Centre
Benin	NTA Benin	1973	7	Zonal Network Centre
Bida	NTA Bida			Community Station
Birnin-Gwari	NTA Birnin-Gwari			Community Station
Birnin-Kebbi	NTA Birnin Kebbi		39	Network Centre
Biu	NTA Biu		29	Community Station
Brass	NTA Brass			Community Station
Calabar	NTA Calabar	1978	6 and 9	Network Centre
Damaturu	NTA Damaturu		5	Network Centre
Dambatta	NTA Dambatta		37	Community Station
Darazo	NTA Darazo			Community Station
Daura	NTA Daura		34	Community Station
Dutse	NTA Dutse	1997	10	Network Centre
Eket	NTA Eket		35	Network Centre
Enugu	NTA Enugu	1960	8	Zonal Network Centre
Funtua	NTA Funtua			Community Station
Ganye	NTA Ganye			Community Station
Gashua	NTA Gashua	2021		Community Station
Gboko	NTA Gboko			Community Station
Gembu	NTA Gembu		21	Community Station
Gombe	NTA Gombe	1982	5	Network Centre
Gumel	NTA Gumel			Community Station
Gusau	NTA Gusau	2000	9 and 3	Network Centre
Hadejia	NTA Hadejia			Community Station
Ibadan	NTA Ibadan	1959	7	Zonal Network Centre
Idah	NTA Idah			Community Station
Ife	NTA Ife-Ife	2003	39	Network Centre
Ijebu Ode	NTA Ijebu-Ode	2003	63	Network Centre
Ikare	NTA Ikare		43	Network Centre
Ilela	NTA Ilela			Community Station
Ikom	NTA Ikom			Community Station
Ilorin	NTA Ilorin	1977	9	Network Centre
Imeko Afon	NTA Imeko		22	Community Station
Iruekpen	NTA Iruekpen	2001	45	Community Station
Jalingo	NTA Jalingo	1982	6	Network Centre
Jatu	NTA Jatu			Network Centre
Jos	NTA Jos	1974	7	Zonal Network Centre
Kabba	NTA Kabba			Okene
Kadejia	NTA Kadejia			Network Centre
Kaduna	NTA Kaduna	1962	4	Zonal Network Centre
Kafanchan	NTA Kafanchan			Network Centre
Kaiama	NTA Kaiama			Community Station
Kaltungo	NTA Kaltungo			Community Station
Kano	NTA Kano	1976	5	Network Centre
Karim Lamido	NTA Karim Lamido			Network Centre
Katsina	NTA Katsina		8	Network Centre
Keffi	NTA Keffi			Network Centre
Kontagora	NTA Kontagora			Community Station
Kumo	NTA Kumo			Community Station
Lafia	NTA Lafia	2003	9	Network Centre
Lagos	NTA Lagos	1962	10	Zonal Network Centre
Lagos	NTA2	1980	5	Zonal Network Centre
Langtang North	NTA Langtang			Community Station
Lokoja	NTA Lokoja	1992	7, 8 and 37	Network Centre
Maiduguri	NTA Maiduguri	1977	10	Zonal Network Centre
Makurdi	NTA Makurdi	1978	10	Zonal Network Centre
Minna	NTA Minna	1978	10	Network Centre
Mubi	NTA Mubi			Community Station
Namoda	NTA Kaura Namoda			Network Centre
New Bussa	NTA New Bussa		21	Community Station
Numan, Nigeria	NTA Numan			Community Station
Ogbomosho	NTA Ogbomoso		5	Network Centre
Ogoja	NTA Ogoja			Network Centre
Okene	NTA Okene			Community Station
Okigwe	NTA Okigwe			Community Station
Okitipupa	NTA Okitipupa			Network Centre
Ondo	NTA Ondo	2002		Community Station
Onitsha	NTA Onitsha		35	Network Centre
Osogbo	NTA Osogbo	2003	49	Network Centre
Otukpo	NTA Otukpo			Community Station
Owerri	NTA Owerri	2003	12	Network Centre
Oyo	NTA Oyo	2003	37	Community Station
Pankshin	NTA Pankshin			Community Station
Pategi	NTA Patigi		41	Community Station
Port Harcourt	NTA Port Harcourt	1974	10	Zonal Network Centre
Potiskum	NTA Potiskum			Community Station
Sapele	NTA Sapele			Network Centre
Shaki	NTA Saki	2003	12	Community Station
Shendam	NTA Shendam			Community Station
Sokoto	NTA Sokoto	1975	5	Zonal Network Centre
Takum	NTA Takum			Community Station
Umuahia	NTA Umuahia	2003	21	Network Centre
Uyo	NTA Uyo		12	Network Centre
Uzairue	NTA Uzairue		41	Network Centre
Warri	NTA Warri			Community Station
Wukari	NTA Wukari			Community Station
Yenagoa	NTA Yenagoa	2001	28	Network Centre
Yola	NTA Yola	1978	8	Network Centre
Zaria	NTA Zaria			Network Centre
Zuru	NTA Zuru			Community Station
Worldwide	NTA International			International channel (also styled NTAi)
Nationwide	NTA Knowledge			Educational channel
Nationwide	NTA Entertainment		StarTimes 105	Entertainment channel (also styled NTAe)
Nationwide	NTA Sports 24			Sports channel
Nationwide	NTA News 24			News channel
Nationwide	NTA Yoruba			Language channel
Nationwide	NTA Igbo			Language channel
Nationwide	NTA Hausa			Language channel

In the past, there was a network centre in Ikeja, NTA Ikeja (channel 7), that existed from 1981 to 2000. There is also an NTA station based in Eket called NTA Eket, broadcast on channel 35, which was abandoned in approximately 2006 as of December 2023. The Nigerian House of Representatives later pushed to reinstate the station to full operations.

== Criticism ==
NTA is partially funded through a state subvention. NTA has faced criticism that the content it covers is influenced by government and politicians. This interference is said to diminish the professionalism of newscasters on NTA.

The NTA has been criticized by performing artists such as Becky Umeh for allegedly pressuring her and other artists to align their expression with government propaganda goals. In an editorial on 18 October 2009, the Lagos newspaper The Guardian stated that "the federal government-owned television network, the Nigerian Television Authority, (NTA) is arguably the largest of its type in Africa, but it is yet to have the operational freedom required to maximize its potential."

It has been suggested that the proliferation of NTA stations in every state capital is not useful for broadcasting but is driven by political reasons. The network has also been criticized for using antiquated technology.

== Related services ==
NTA's digital Pay TV service, Startimes, was established in 2010 as a partnership with Star Communications Technology of China. Additional NTA channels include NTA Yoruba, NTA Ibo, NTA Hausa, NTA Sports 24 and NTA Parliamentary Channel. In January 2013, it began deploying a subscription DVB-T2 system.

== International broadcast ==
A number of NTA programmes can be viewed online via Africast as well as TelAfric Television in the US and Canada. NTA News bulletins are frequently aired on Africa Independent Television and BEN Television in the United Kingdom, where the station was also launched on Sky on channel 213 in 2008. It moved to channel 202 on 1 September 2008 to give space to new channels. In early March 2010, NTA refused to broadcast as a pay-per-view channel on Sky, and was removed from Sky EPG on the following day. The channel returned on Sky in the UK on 20 June 2018 on channel 781.

NTA is also available on the IPTV platform SuncasTV, and via free-to-air satellite on Amos 17, SES 3, SES 5, Badr 7, Express AMU1, NigComSat 1R, Eutelsat 3B and Belintersat-1.

== Notable staff ==
- Eugenia Abu - Newsreader and correspondent (Network News, Newsline), NTA Network
- Muhammad Kudu Abubakar - Newsreader (Network News), NTA Network
- Art Alade - Presenter (The Bar Beach Show), NTA Lagos
- Chris Anyanwu - Newsreader and reporter, NTA Aba
- Ben Murray-Bruce - NTA director-general (1999–2003)
- Julie Coker - Newsreader and presenter (Julie's World), NTA Lagos
- Sadiq Daba - Producer and editor, NTA Sokoto and NTA Jos
- Funmi Iyanda - Sports reporter and presenter (New Dawn On Ten), NTA Lagos
- Chuka Momah - Presenter (NTA Sports, Big Fight of the Decade, Sports Spectacular), NTA Network
- John Momoh - Newsreader (Network News and Tonight At Nine), NTA Network
- Tade Ogidan - Producer/Director, NTA 2 Channel 5
- Boniface Offokaja - first Nigerian head of news department, NTV (1963- ?)
- Onyeka Onwenu - Newsreader and reporter, NTA Lagos; presenter (Contact and Who's On?), NTA Network
- Nkem Owoh - Producer and newsreader, NTA Enugu
- Bimbo Roberts - Newsreader (Network News), NTA Network
- Cyril Stober - Newsreader (Network News), NTA Network
- Alex Usifo - Operations assistant/producer, NTA Benin
- Ruth Benamaisia-Opia - Newscaster (Network News, Newsline)

== See also ==
- Bauchi State Television
