= Insurgency in Southeastern Nigeria =

Conflict in Nigeria (2021–present)

- Part of the herder–farmer conflicts in Nigeria and the conflict in the Niger Delta
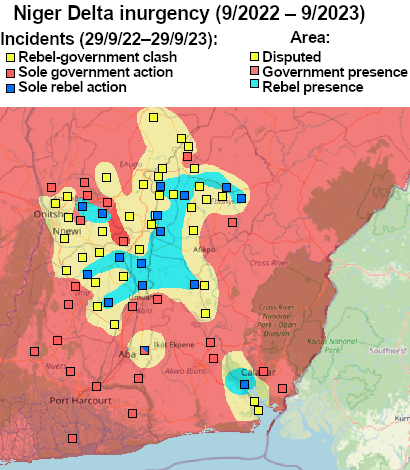
- Separatist presence Government presence Contested
Date	16 January 2021 – present (5 years, 10 months and 3 days)
Location	Former Eastern Region of Nigeria, plus Delta State and Benue State (spillover into Bakassi, Cameroon)
Status	Ongoing; IPOB declared on 19 February 2021 that a state of war existed; Ban of Twitter in Nigeria from 5 June 2021; Nnamdi Kanu arrested by Interpol on 27 June 2021
Territorial changes	Biafran separatists control about 700 hectares in southeastern Nigeria by mid-2024

Belligerents
Nigeria Spillover into Bakassi: Cameroon	(Republic of Biafra) Biafran separatists Oduduwa separatists (only against Fulani herders)

Commanders and leaders
Bola Tinubu; Ibrahim Attahiru; Ibrahim Tukura; Hope Uzodinma; Abdulkarim Usman	Nnamdi Kanu (POW); Emma Powerful Simon Ekpa (arrested) (until 17 November 2026); Princewill Chimezie Richard; Innocent Orji; Asari Dokubo (Head of BCG)

Units involved
Nigerian Armed Forces; Nigerian Army; 82 Division; 34 Brigade; 6 Division; 302 Artillery Regiment; Nigerian Air Force; 211 Quick Response Group; Nigerian Navy; Nigeria Police Force; Imo State Police Command; State Security Service; Ebube Agu; Armed Fulani raiders	Indigenous People of Biafra (IPOB); Eastern Security Network; "Autopilots" faction, became BRGIE; Biafra Nations League (BNL); Black Marine; Biafra Republic Government in Exile (BRGIE); Biafra Liberation Army (BLA); "Angry Vipers"; Niger Delta militants; Oduduwa Volunteer Force for the Liberation of Southern Nigeria; Biafran National Guard (BNG)/Biafran Supreme Military Council of Administration

Casualties and losses
127 killed (government claim as of Aug. 2021)	Unknown
- 115 civilians and militants killed (acc. Amnesty International as of Aug. 2021)

The insurgency in Southeastern Nigeria is a military conflict that broke out in the city of Orlu, Imo State, Nigeria on 16 January 2021, when the Nigerian Army moved to crush the paramilitary wing of the Indigenous People of Biafra (IPOB), the Eastern Security Network (ESN). The conflict escalated after the ESN managed to repulse the initial push by the Nigerian Army, but IPOB ended the initial crisis by unilaterally withdrawing the ESN from Orlu. After a few weeks of quiet, Nigeria launched a military offensive in the area to destroy the ESN. On 19 February 2021, IPOB declared that as of the day before, a state of war existed between Nigeria and Biafra. Three weeks later, another separatist group declared the formation of a Biafran interim government which was subsequently endorsed by IPOB. Since then, the Biafran separatists have begun to form alliances with other separatist groups in Nigeria and Cameroon. Despite these developments, the separatists claimed that their militant operations were mainly aimed at defending local communities from armed herders and bandits instead of fighting the Nigerian government. In late June, IPOB leader Nnamdi Kanu was arrested by Interpol and handed over to Nigerian authorities.

== Background ==
Biafra (light brown) attempted to separate from the rest of Nigeria (dark brown) during the Nigerian Civil War.

In 1967, separatists in Nigeria's southeast declared the formation of the independent state of Biafra. The subsequent Nigerian Civil War lasted two and a half years, led to over a million dead, and ended with the defeat of Biafra. Over the following decades, Nigeria continued to suffer from regional instability and revolts, but Biafra separatism was mostly dormant until the 2000s. Some Niger Delta communities such as the Ijaw people even integrated anti-Biafran sentiment into their own popular narratives, as they had mostly sided with the central government during the Nigerian Civil War.

From the 1990s, a growing number of people in southeastern Nigeria such as Igbo and Niger Delta natives felt marginalized by the Nigerian central government. This resulted in the violent conflict in the Niger Delta, and previously anti-Biafran communities such as Ijaw began to reevaluate their commitment to Nigeria. Coupled with disaffection among the youth due to high unemployment, this contributed to a resurgence of Biafran nationalism in the entire southeast. While most of the local political leadership distanced themselves from separatism, radical Biafran nationalists organized in the secessionist group IPOB. Other hardline Biafran groups included the Movement for the Actualization of the Sovereign State of Biafra (MASSOB), the Biafra Nations League (BNL; initially known as Biafra Nations Youth League / BNYL), and the Biafran National Guard (BNG). The latter already declared war on the Nigerian Army in 2017.

At the same time, Nigerians became disaffected as the central government failed to suppress the destructive Boko Haram insurgency as well as banditry in the north, while the Nigerian security forces faced accusations of corruption, ineffectiveness, and abuse. Journalists Cai Nebe and Muhammad Bello argued that "swathes of Nigeria remain near-ungovernable" as of Muhammadu Buhari's second presidency. Tensions in the southeast continued to rise after the local economy, heavily dependent on exporting oil, suffered under worldwide low oil prices. By 2020, IPOB had managed to rally substantial following to its cause, although polls showcased that Biafran separatism was not widely supported in the southeast. Non-IPOB groups also began to support separatism such as the Niger Delta People's Salvation Force led by "warlord" Asari-Dokubo. However, there were tensions within the Biafran separatist movement, with Kanu having been accused of intolerance toward non-Jews. The IPOB leader self-identifies as Jew and claims that Judaism is the Igbo's traditional religion.

In August 2020, Nigerian police forces went to an IPOB meeting in Enugu and executed 21 unarmed IPOB members with two police officers dead. Both sides accused the other of firing the first shot. Following the incident, IPOB pledged to retaliate and called on its members to start practicing self-defense. In late-September, at least two Nigerian soldiers were killed during clashes with unidentified gunmen in Enugu; however, IPOB denied any involvement, announcing that "we are not armed and have no plans to pick up arms."

On 12 December 2020, Kanu announced the formation of the ESN to protect Igbos against Fulani raiders. Unwilling to countenance the formation of a non-state-sanctioned paramilitary organization on its territory, the Nigerian government deployed the army to locate ESN camps two weeks later.

== The Orlu Crisis (16–28 January 2021) ==
On 16 January, Nigerian police attacked the ESN in their camp. However, the attack was repulsed by the militia. On 22 January 2021, Nigerian soldiers invaded Orlu to search for ESN operatives. Eight buildings were burnt and one person was killed in the ensuing events. Security forces re-invaded the area three days later, clashing with the ESN and killing at least five people before being repulsed by the ESN. Four Nigerian soldiers were killed in the fighting. The Nigerian Army withdrew, and in the following days, Nigerian Air Force planes and helicopters were deployed to search for ESN operatives in and around Orlu.

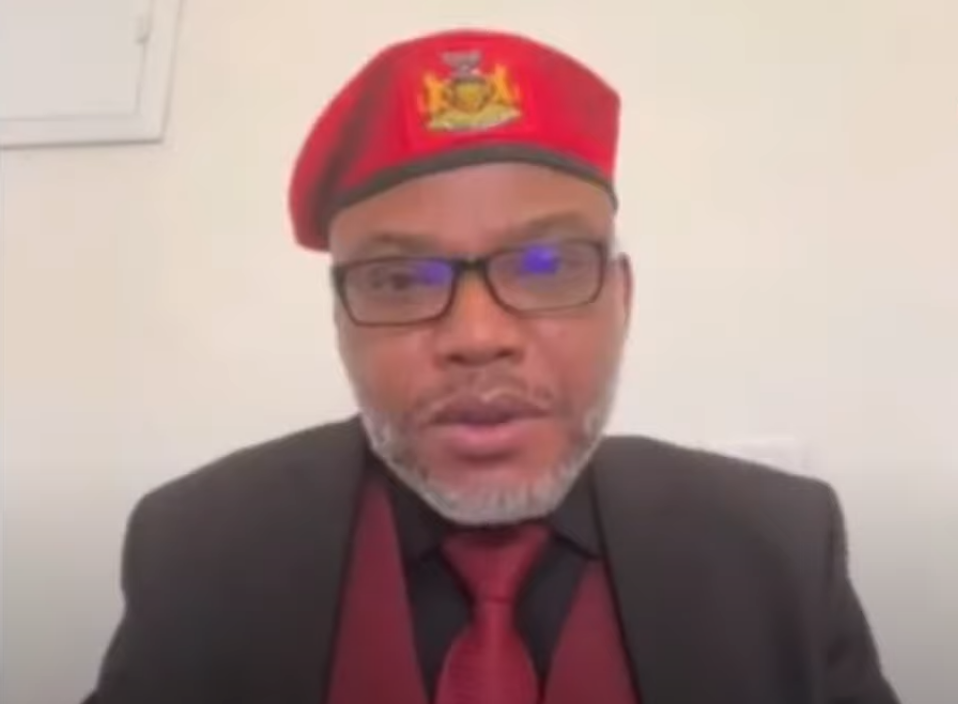
Nnamdi Kanu (pictured 2021) declared the Eastern Security Network's withdrawal from Orlu on 28 January 2021.

On 28 January, more than 400 Nigerian soldiers were deployed to oust the ESN and the authorities declared a curfew which was brutally enforced. The curfew and the anticipation of imminent heavy fighting caused civilians to flee the city en masse. Later on the same day, Nnamdi Kanu declared a unilateral ceasefire and ordered the ESN withdraw from Orlu to focus on Fulani raiders instead. Kanu claimed that this decision was based on intelligence information that revealed that the army and the police had agreed to withdraw from Orlu also.

== Interlude ==
During the fighting, police officers of the Imo State Police were caught on video flogging civilians, possibly as punishment for curfew violations. After the ceasefire, at least ten police officers were arrested, and Commissioner of Police Nasiru Mohammed condemned their behavior.

Days after the Orlu Crisis, IPOB gave all the governors of southeast Nigeria 14 days to ban open grazing, threatening to deploy the ESN to enforce a ban if the authorities did not do so. However, the ESN did not wait 14 days; a few days later, ESN operatives attacked a Fulani camp in Isuikwuato, Abia State, killing their livestock and burning down their houses. Following the raid, some governors responded by heeding the ESN's call and banning open grazing.

== Renewed fighting and declaration of war (18 February 2021–present) ==
At some point in mid-February, the Nigerian Army 34 Artillery Brigade launched an operation to find ESN camps around Orlu and Orsu. The Nigerian Army also reinforced Orlu, deploying military helicopters to the city. Hostilities were renewed on 18 February, when the Nigerian Army and the ESN fought a gun battle in the forest outside Orlu while the Nigerian Air Force conducted air strikes in the area. A day into the fighting, the confrontation had spread to Ihiala, Anambra State. Nigerian forces captured an ESN base in the village of Udah outside Orsu on 21 February. The Nigerian Army 82 division also arrested 20 suspected IPOB members and confiscated their weapons.

The same day as hostilities were renewed, IPOB said that the military deployment constituted a "declaration of war against the Igbos" and accused the Nigerian government of planning a "final solution to the Biafran question". The group declared that Nigeria had "crossed the line of no return" and that Igbos now had no choice but defend themselves. The next day, IPOB declared that the "second Nigeria/Biafra war" had begun on 18 February, and that unlike in the 1967–1970 Nigerian Civil War, Biafra would win.

=== Spillover and escalation ===
Within a few days, the danger of spillover into other parts of the former East Region became evident. In response to the Nigerian military operation in and around Orlu, the Biafra Nations League threatened to attack all oil installations in Bakassi. In Aguata, Anambra State, suspected Biafran separatists killed four policemen at a checkpoint and took off with their weapons on 24 February. Another four policemen were killed in Calabar the next day. On 26 February, a police station was attacked in Aboh Mbaise, Imo State. On 3 March, gunmen killed two policemen in Cross River State.

The attacks were condemned by the Movement for the Actualization of the Sovereign State of Biafra. MASSOB also condemned Imo State Governor Hope Uzodinma for inviting the Nigerian Army.

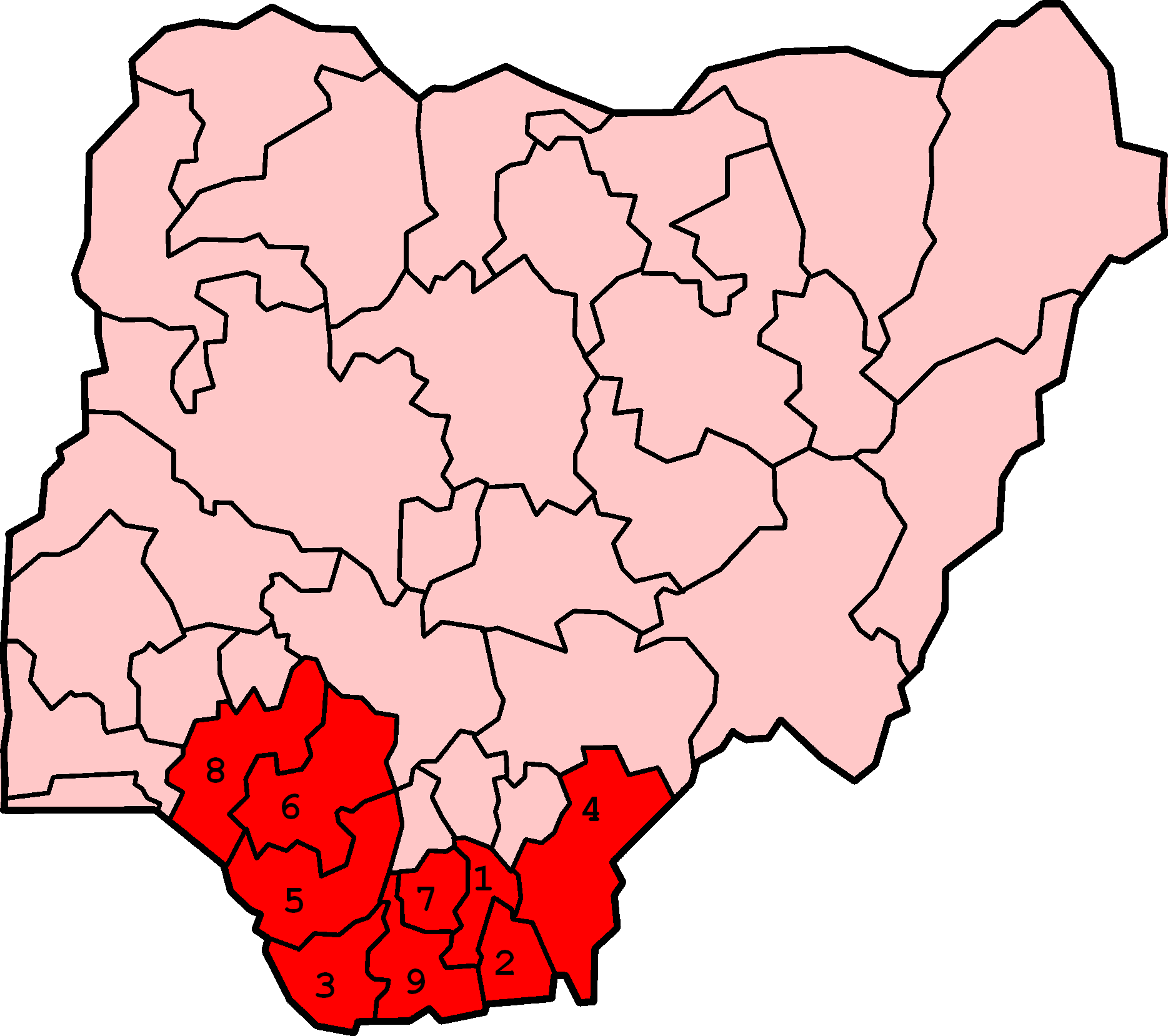
By March 2021, Biafran separatists were active in several Nigerian states located in the Niger Delta.

Local authorities blamed the ESN and IPOB for many attacks on police stations, some of which preceded the Orlu Crisis. The Police Commissioner of Delta State alleged that IPOB elements had crossed the Niger River to infiltrate the state. To prevent such infiltrations, the Nigerian Navy started patrolling the river. In early March, IPOB threatened to deploy the ESN to Benue State to protect Igbos against Fulani raiders; this came after the killings of IPOB activists by armed Fulani. Days later, Nnamdi Kanu declared that the ESN had captured a prominent Fulani bandit leader named Mohammed Isa in Benue State.

In mid-March, the leader of the Niger Delta People's Salvation Force, Asari-Dokubo, declared the formation of the Biafra Customary Government (BCG). The BCG was intended as the first step of establishing a de facto government for an independent State of Biafra. Dokubo stated that Biafra would not go to war, but that it would go through with secession from Nigeria. IPOB soon threw its support behind the BCG, declaring that it would support any Biafran independence movement. A few days later, the MASSOB led by Ralph Uwazuruike, endorsed the BCG. However, Asari-Dokubo and Nnamdi Kanu had previously quarrelled with each other, and the rivalry continued after the BCG's formation, especially after some IPOB leaders had officially switched allegiance to the BCG. Internationally, IPOB gained the support of the Ambazonia Governing Council (AGovC), an Ambazonian separatist movement led by Ayaba Cho Lucas and with its own armed wing, the Ambazonia Defence Forces (ADF). In April, IPOB and AGovC moved towards a formal alliance. This move was not unprecedented, as the BNL/BNYL had already openly aligned itself with Ambazonian separatists in 2017.

While separatist movements formed a unified front, militants escalated the war. Soon after the formation of the BCG, the BNL declared that it had taken control over "creeks and bushes" in the Bakassi Peninsula, and threatened to hijack any oil vessels coming from there. On 19 March, gunmen attacked a prison and a police station in Ekwulobia, releasing several prisoners and killing two policemen and two prison officials, but failing to burn down the police station. IPOB denied any involvement.

On 15 March, the ESN invaded Eleme to expel Fulani herders. A week into the ESN offensive, Fulani raiders invaded Agbonchia and committed atrocities against the civilian population. On 5 April, armed men stormed a prison in Owerri, enabling some 1,800 inmates to escape. The Nigerian government blamed IPOB, which in turn denied any involvement. In mid-April, state governors announced the formation of Ebube Agu, a pro-government security network. IPOB declared that the ESN was sufficient, and alleged that the true purpose of Ebube Agu was to fight the ESN.

On 14 April, armed men launched several attacks in Njikoka and hoisted a Biafran flag. Before the attack, Nnamdi Kanu had accused the Nigerian government of plotting false-flag attacks to destroy the image of ESN. On 24 April, the top ESN commander known as Ikonso was killed when the Nigerian Army allegedly raided an ESN camp in Imo State. IPOB blamed governor Hope Uzodinma, as their intelligence stated he was killed in his house. After less than 24 hours, IPOB announced that a new top commander had been instated. In May, the Biafran National Guard (BNG), now headed by the so-called "Biafran Supreme Military Council of Administration" (BSMCA) which posed as high command of the restored Biafran Armed Forces, declared its intent to conquer southeastern Nigeria, starting with Anambra State.

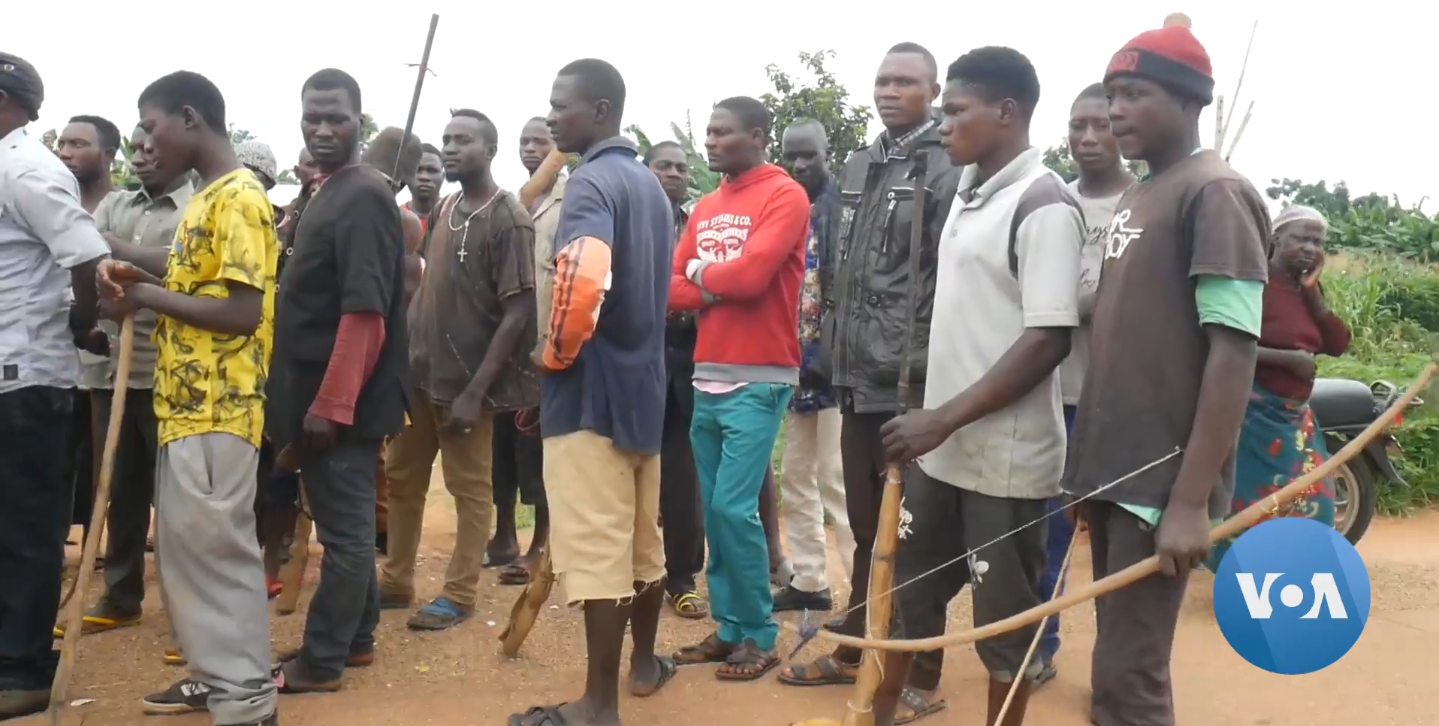
A group of armed youth separatists of unknown affiliation in southern Nigeria.

In early June, President Buhari tweeted a warning to southeastern Nigerians in response to the IPOB insurgency. Regarding the tweet as incitement to violence, Twitter deleted it, prompting the Nigerian government to ban Twitter entirely from 5 June. On 8 June, the Nigerian Police raided and destroyed another ESN camp in Imo State, reportedly freeing a kidnapped policewoman. Despite this, a police official claimed around the same time that security forces had not yet encountered any ESN camps or even ESN members. In mid-June, IPOB allied with the "Oduduwa Volunteer Force for the Liberation of Southern Nigeria". The latter was a force of Yoruba separatists who advocate the establishment of the "Oduduwa Republic". The two separatist groups announced the formation of the "Biafra and Oduduwa Volunteer Force" to coordinate their efforts to fight armed Fulani herders. Meanwhile, Imo State authorities claimed that IPOB militants had killed 128 security personnel since the insurgency's start. IPOB strongly denied these claims, arguing that it remained committed to non-violent solutions and had no interest in openly fighting against Nigerian security forces. Soon after, the Nigerian Army raided Abia and clashed with the ESN, resulting in death of six soldiers. This counter-insurgency operation reportedly resulted in many civilians fleeing Elu, Amangwu and Amekpu out of fear of government reprisals. Furthermore, the verbal struggle between the separatist leaders Asari-Dokubo and Kanu worsened due to both accusing each other of embezzling funds of the separatist movement.

In late June, Islamic cleric Ahmad Gumi accused IPOB of murdering northerners, "while bandits only abducted students for money". In response, IPOB leader Kanu reiterated that the ESN was primarily concerned with combating banditry by "Fulani jihadists" and accused Gumi of becoming a "mouthpiece for bandits and terrorists". In addition, five governors of southeastern Nigerian states denounced pro-Biafran groups, resulting in IPOB and the BNL condemning the governors in turn. In addition, the BNL publicly threatened to expand the insurgency, arguing that the Biafran separatists also should continue fighting against Cameroon in the Bakassi conflict. The group threatened to launch pirate raids against Nigerian and Cameroonian vessels in the Gulf of Guinea.

=== Arrest of Nnamdi Kanu and strikes in the southeast ===
On 27 June, Nnamdi Kanu was arrested by Interpol in Kenya or another location, extradited to Nigeria, and handed over to Nigerian authorities. The latter stated that the IPOB leader is supposed to face trial. Meanwhile, President Buhari referenced the separatist unrest in a TV interview, declaring that the Igbo people were a "dot in a circle" and could be easily crushed. Kanu's arrest precluded a confrontation with his separatist rival Asari-Dokubo who had threatened a "clampdown" on the IPOB leader shortly before. Following the IPOB leader's detention, his "self-acclaimed disciple" Simon Ekpa rose to prominence, promising that Biafran activists would prevent the Anambra State gubernatorial election of November 2021. The Nigerian government also managed to arrest Sunday Adeyemo (alias "Sunday Igboho"), a Yoruba separatist leader, in Benin.

In early July, security forces arrested ESN commander Emeoyiri Uzorma Benjamin (alias "Onye Army"), accusing him and his followers of killings, destruction of property, and atrocities in Imo State. In the same month, ESN fighters attacked a military checkpoint at Adani, Uzo Uwani, killing two soldiers. Following several raids by the security forces against ESN camps, militants allegedly murdered Paschal Okeke, a juju priest. The ESN militants were reportedly upset that his protective charms had failed to shield them from the government. In late July, a military officer was injured by suspected ESN militants in Ohafia, Abia, reportedly prompting security forces to take revenge by storming the town and destroying several houses.

In early August, Amnesty International declared that Nigerian security forces had killed 115 civilians and militants since the unrest's start, while the government stated that 127 members of the security forces had been killed. Amnesty International argued that the security forces had made numerous arbitrary arrests of often uninvolved civilians, and accused them of human rights abuses. On 9 August, IPOB supporters began a stay-at-home protest for the release of Kanu. Despite orders by the government to ignore IPOB's calls for the action, a majority in several settlements across southeastern Nigeria complied with the lockdown. Militant separatists burned at least three buses whose drivers had not taken part in the protest and continued to work. Kanu's trial began in Abuja in October 2021, with him pleading non-guilty. The trial was accompanied by protests of the separatist leader's supporters, and Voice of America journalist Timothy Obiezu argued that IPOB appeared to be gaining strength instead of losing it. A new "sit-at-home" strike affected southeastern Nigeria, shutting down most services and businesses there.

=== "Exercise Golden Dawn", increasing intra-Biafran tensions, and clashes at Bakassi ===
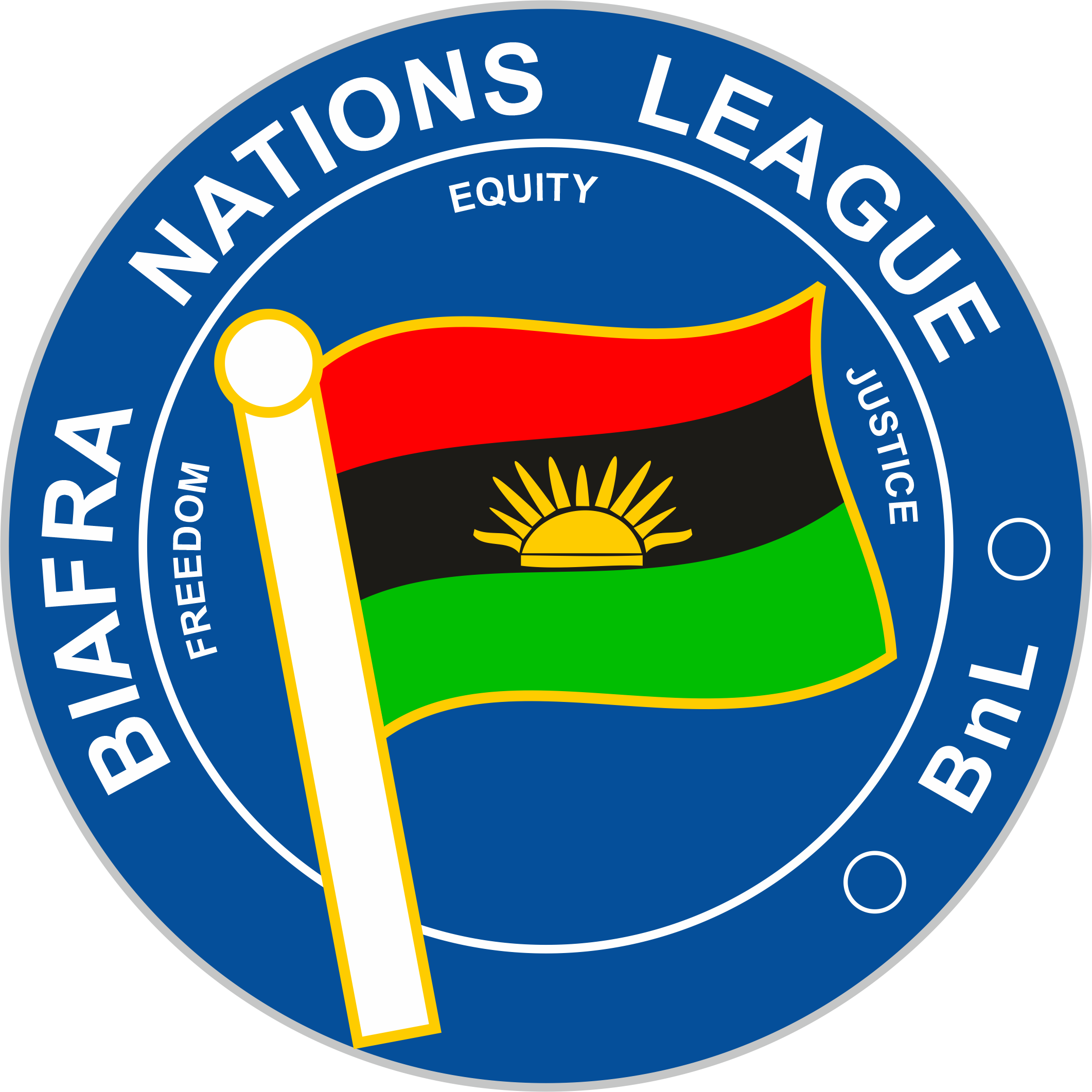
Biafra Nations League militants (seal pictured) temporarily took control of a border crossing in November 2021.

From early October 2021, the 302 Artillery Regiment led by Col. Abdulkarim Usman launched "Exercise Golden Dawn", an operation aimed at combating MASSOB, IPOB, ESN, and other anti-government groups in Anambra State. On 8 November, the BNL took control of a border crossing between Akpabuyo and Bakassi, blocking the road leading to the Peninsula and raising the Biafran flag. The militants retreated before a Nigerian Armed Forces contingent arrived. The BNL consequently claimed that it had taken control of parts of Bakassi, setting up its headquarters there and declaring that it was mobilizing its "marine members" for a "show of force." Reactions to the BNL activities were mixed at the border communities, with some protesting against and others for the group. In this month, the BNG also looted a number of shops, resulting in IPOB dismissing it as "a criminal group". In response, BNG claimed that they had acquired military rockets in preparation for the "secessionist war". Meanwhile, a separatist militia called "Angry Vipers" demanded the release of Kanu and threatened various figures including businessman Obi Cubana who they believed supported Fulani herders.

From December 2021, the governors in the five southeastern states of Nigeria were tasked by the government to finally organize the Ebube Agu security network. IPOB once again denounced these efforts, arguing that such outfits had previously failed to counter bandits, and that the new force was still aimed at countering the ESN. On Christmas Eve 2021, the ESN raided Akpawfu. In response, Nigerian Army troops involved in "Exercise Golden Dawn" attacked a nearby location suspected of harboring ESN militants. The military claimed that it arrested an important ESN commander named Godwin Nnamdi after a short firefight. In contrast, the "International Society for Civil Liberties and Rule of Law" claimed that the army had actually detained Godwin Nnaji, a civilian with IPOB sympathies, and falsely portrayed him as an ESN leader.

In January 2022, tensions further rose regionally and locally. IPOB began boycotting northern products such as cow meat in the southeast, whereupon northerners called for boycotts of southeastern goods. At the same time, Dokubo Asari called for the execution of all IPOB members, signifying the growing tensions among the Biafran separatists. BNL condemned Asari's call for violence, arguing that IPOB had indeed sidelined and offended other Biafran groups, but that this should not cause violent infighting among the anti-government forces. In this month suspected IPOB members also abducted an ex-Assembly speaker and four others in Imo State, while the Nigerian Armed Forces claimed the destruction of an IPOB/ESN stronghold in Lilu forest at Ihiala. Fighting also became more intense at Bakassi, as BNL clashed with the Nigerian and Cameroonian militaries and attempted to prevent ships from approaching the peninsula.

On 1 February, claims began to circulate on social media according to which "Black Marine", a group suspected of being part of the BNL, had killed a Nigerian Navy officer at Oron Beach. The Nigerian Navy stated that these claims were false. A few days later, the Nigerian Army claimed to have killed four ESN militants at Ihiala. On 15 February, gunmen suspected to be separatists killed eight traders and 51 cows at a market in Aba; IPOB denied responsibility. On the same day, Ekpa declared that IPOB would no longer take orders from Kanu, as he could not lead the group from prison. However, a large section of IPOB disapproved of Ekpa's position. The strikes in the southeast also continued, and even many schools remained closed. In late February, gunmen suspected to be IPOB/ESN members attacked Ekwulobia and Oko, killing 12 and kidnapping several others.

On 13 April, a BNL commander was killed by the Cameroonian military in Idabato, Bakassi. On 26 April, reports began circulating that two military gunboats has been bombed by Black Marine, a suspected arm wing of BnL who also claimed responsibility for the attack Few days later, 23 persons were arrested in Ikom, a border town in Cross River State by the Police, at first it was reported that they were members of MASSOB, later, BnL confirmed 17 of them are their members arrested in their houses outside the main town, the remaining 6 who are Igbo traders were arrested inside a shop in the main town. On Friday 13 May 2022, suspected militants of BnL attacked the Ikang jetty, in Bakassi Area of Cross River State killing a Police officer and injuring many others, this is barely a week after the Police arrested 23 members of BnL in Ikom.

In the second half of May, suspected IPOB militants carried out a series of killings: Okechukwu Okoye, a member of the Anambra State House of Assembly, and his aide were abducted and murdered on 15 May; seven days later, separatist militants murdered 11 northerners in Anambra State: a pregnant woman and her four children in Orumba North; five commercial motorcycle riders in Onocha, and a salesman at Nnanka. On 23 July, five Cameroonian soldiers were killed when they invaded a BNL camp in Bakassi; the BNL lost one fighter during the clash. In August 2022, Ekpa declared the formation of the "Biafra Republic Government in Exile" (BRGIE), a move denounced by IPOB. The separatist group's Media and Publicity Secretary Emma Powerful outright called Ekpa's faction a "scam" organized by dissidents.

=== Leadup to and aftermath of the 2023 Nigerian elections ===
Meanwhile, IPOB suspected militants attempted to disrupt the preparations for the 2023 Nigerian elections, attacking offices of the Independent National Electoral Commission (INEC) across the southeast. INEC responded by increasing its efforts at registration drives, though remained hampered by logistical issues. In September, gunmen attacked the convoy of Senator Ifeanyi Ubah of the Young Progressives Party at Enugwu-Ukwu; five people were killed, though the senator remained unharmed. IPOB continued to accuse local security forces of cooperating with militant herdsmen and Islamists, describing the new head of the 82 Division, Major General Ahmed Chinade, as "another Fulani stooge and Igbo hater" who previously had killed and abused "Biafrans" in the Port Harcourt area. On their part, the security forces attempted to contain the militant activities which were disrupting the election preparations, launching security sweeps and capturing or killing some suspected ESN militants. The police also reportedly seized a weapons stockpile assembled by Oduduwan nationalists.

As sporadic attacks on southeastern INEC offices continued into the new year, a commission official warned that the election could be forced into postponement if the attacks were not stopped. Although the comment was quickly retracted and the commission promised to hold the election as scheduled, concerns continued considering the deadly attacks—like previous southeastern attacks on INEC, experts stated that the attacks were most likely conducted by violent secessionist groups attempting to "delegitimise the electoral process and boost their separatist agenda." The attacks continued until the election, as did concerns that the election would be postponed at the last moment. Separatists like Simon Ekpa called for lockdowns in the period leading up the election. Just before the election, suspected separatists killed seven policemen in a series of attacks in Anambra State. At the same time, fighting also continued in Bakassi, with several clashes resulting in losses on both sides. Cameroonian security forces captured a BNL camp in Bakassi in August 2022. BNL militants killed two Cameroonian soldiers and raised the Biafran flag at Abana on the peninsula in January 2023. Soon after, Cameroon claimed that its Rapid Intervention Battalion had captured BNL commander Henry Edet at Atabong East in Bakassi. Suspected BNL followers also attacked ships around Bakassi. On 14 February, the Federal High Court in Abakaliki ordered the disbandment of the Ebube Agu network in Ebonyi State, declaring the group an illegal armed force.

In April 2023, Simon Ekpa declared himself "Prime Minister" of the Biafran Republic Government in Exile (BRGIE), calling for the United Nations to acknowledge Biafra and release Nnamdi Kanu. Despite this, Kanu ordered one of his followers to release a message condemning the BRGIE as "treasonous to his quest for Biafran statehood". Meanwhile, suspected separatist rebels ambushed a convoy of U.S. Embassy staffers at Ogbaru in Anambra State, killing two policemen and two local workers, while abducting three others. In July, suspected IPOB/ESN militants reportedly attacked a location in Asaba, Delta State, whereupon the 63 Brigade of the Nigerian Army, police, and State Security Service organized a raid which resulted in the death of two rebels and capture of five. In the same month, Ekpa's BRGIE organized a sit-at-home order across southeastern Nigeria. Even though IPOB disavowed the order, it was widely carried out with the support of separatist militants. Around this time, repeated rebel raids heavily affected the town of Izombe, burning houses, killing the local traditional ruler Victor Ijioma, and causing many residents to flee. Izombe had previously been one of the "main oil-bearing areas and [the] food basket of" Imo State.

=== Emergence of the BLA, "Operation Udoka", and arrest of Ekpa ===
On 4 September 2023, Simon Ekpa released a video displaying weapons purportedly belonging to a group he dubbed "Biafran Liberation Army" (BLA), followed shortly by an ambush that resulted in the deaths of five to eight security personnel in Imo State. The Biafra Liberation Army was identified as the armed wing of Ekpa's BRGIE, having emerged from IPOB's "Autopilot" faction. Over the next months, Ekpa repeatedly made claims about successful BLA attacks on security forces, though journalist Kunle Adebajo identified many of these claims as false and misleading. On 11 November, the Biafran Liberation Army temporarily captured Eke Market in Imo State. On 17 November, unidentified gunmen killed two policemen in Ebonyi, followed by the killing of two more policemen in Ahiara on 27 November.

In December 2023, the Nigerian security forces launched "Operation Udoka" under Major General Hassan Taiwo Dada to reduce the presence and influence of separatist forces across the southeast. In March 2024, the Nigerian Army eliminated a number of separatist camps, including a longstanding rebel base near Orsumoghu and the B44 camp in Oru, Imo State. By April, the contingents involved in "Operation Udoka" claimed to have destroyed 16 IPOB camps, killed 35 rebels, and arrested 137. However, suspected IPOB/ESN militants ambushed a Nigerian military convoy engaged in "Operation Udoka" in May, killing five soldiers and six civilians at Aba in Abia State. By mid-2024, a "vast stretch" of woodlands (about 700 hectares) between Anambra and Imo States had reportedly become a "no man's land" controlled by pro-Biafran militants, many loyal to IPOB.

In November 2024, Ekpa was arrested by local police in Finland, with Nigerian military authorities praising this move.

In August 2025 IPOB rejected the claim that IPOB camps had been destroyed by the Nigerian Army.

Around November 2025 Nnamdi Kanu was sentenced to life in prison over terrorist charges. In November 2025 Nigeria claimed that around 30 thousand Igbos were killed however IPOB rejected this statement, demanding for the Abia Governor to provide evidence for this.

== Nature of Conflict ==
In October 2026, as part of the court proceedings of Simon Ekpa, an Finnish court had to ponder the state of the conflict in Nigeria. The court compared the conflict to other conflicts, like the Bosnian War for references, including court proceedings from the International Criminal Court on the subject. The court concluded that the equipment and weaponry used by the Nigerian state merits the designation of an 'internal conflict'. However the court also concluded that the conflict does not reach the ceiling for an 'civil war', because the intensity of fighting was considered too low and there hadn't been large number of refugees generated by said conflict.

== See also ==
- Nigerian Civil War
- Oyo State coup attempt
