= 2024 Aba killings =

Armed conflict that occurred in Aba, Abia State of Nigeria

- Part of Insurgency in Southeastern Nigeria
- Date: 30 May 2024
- Time: 8:00 a.m (UTC+01:00)
- Venue: Military checkpoint at Obikabia junction
- Location: Aba
- Type: Armed conflict
- Cause: Biafran Heroes Day
- Perpetrator: Unknown Gunmen
- Participants: 15 Gunmen
- Outcome: Reprisals by the Nigerian Army
- Deaths: 11
- Injuries: 1 injured due to stray bullet
- Arrests: More than 100
- Suspects: Members of the Eastern Security Network (ESN)
- Accused: IPOB and BRGIE

The 2024 Aba killings were an armed conflict that occurred in Aba, Nigeria, on 30 May 2024 in which at least 11 people were killed following the conflicting sit-at-home orders issued by the Indigenous People of Biafra (IPOB) and the Biafra Republic Government in Exile (BRGIE) to commemorate deceased Biafran Heroes/Heroines. Among those killed in the incident were 5 soldiers and 6 civilians with 1 injured. The attack was widely reported to have been carried out by unknown gunmen against the Nigerian Army stationed at Obikabia junction, checkpoint.

The Nigerian Defence Headquarters threatened fierce retaliation against the perpetrators.

== Background ==
Prior to the incident, gunmen had on 17 May 2024 attacked personnel of the Nigerian Army at an outpost in the Milverton area of Aba. The attack left two soldiers and one civilian dead. Governor Alex Otti condemned the attack and met with the Army.

== Attack ==
On 30 May 2024, unknown gunmen numbering about 15 attacked soldiers of the Nigerian Army stationed at a military checkpoint at Obikabia Junction, Aba in Abia State, killing 5 soldiers and 6 civilians on the spot. Earlier reports indicated that 1 soldier sustained serious injuries, but later reports confirmed the soldier's death, bringing the number of dead soldiers to 5. The total death toll after the incident was reportedly 11 as widely circulated. 1 civilian was also injured by a stray bullet. An eyewitness said the gunmen used cars with tinted windows, which caught the soldiers off guard. Patrol vehicles were burnt, and the weapons of the slain soldiers were carted away.

== Reactions ==
Governor Alex Otti placed 25 million naira reward on the perpetrators. On 7 June, the reward was increased to 30 million Naira. The Nigerian Defence Headquarters, through its Director of Defence Media Operations major general Edward Buba threatened fierce reprisals and overwhelming pressure on the perpetrators. President Bola Tinubu described the incident as a treasonable offense and threatened military action against the perpetrators.

Prime Minister of the BRGIE Simon Ekpa said Tinubu had no legitimacy over Biafra and threatened in return that his government would deal with the Nigerian security agencies decisively.

== Aftermath ==
On 3 June, Aba residents started to flee their homes while others remained indoors for fear of reprisal by the Nigerian Army. Vanguard observed that soldiers had deserted checkpoints at Emelogu junction, Bata junction and Asa road in Abia State.

In retaliation, the Nigerian Army raided communities, arrested and assaulted many Abia residents.

On 5 June 2024, the Army denied committing retaliatory mass killings following allegations raised by Simon Ekpa. Later, the Nigerian Defence Headquarters disclosed that more than 100s of people had been arrested in search of the perpetrators.

== Investigations ==
On 6 June 2024, the House of Representatives ordered the Nigerian Armed Forces to conduct a thorough investigation into the killings to identify the gunmen. Governor of Abia State, Alex Otti, urged the Army not to punish innocent people during their investigations.

On June 7, the Government of Abia State said credible information was already coming in, revealing the perpetrators of the incident.
