= Eddy Nawgu =

Nigerian occultist and serial ritual killer (1957–2000)

- Nawgu In the Anioma healing centre
- Born: Edward Onyebuchi Okeke; 1957; Anambra state, Nigeria
- Died: 9 November 2000 (aged 43); Onitsha, Anambra
- Other names: Eddy na Nawgu, Edwin Okeke.
- Occupation: Nigerian occultist
- Spouse: Joyce Okeke

Eddy Nawgu// (born Edward Onyebuchi Okeke//) was a Nigerian alleged sorcerer, occultist and, as described by the Nigerian media; a false prophet who initially proclaimed himself to be a prophet of the biblical Abrahamic God. He bore several sobriquets throughout his life time but was predominantly known in the mid-1990s as Eddy Nawgu, alternatively spelt as Eddie Nawgu among Igbo people. An alternative form of this name, Eddy na Nawgu, which translates to Eddy in Nawgu, came about because he was from the Nawgu community, a town situated in the Dunukofia LGA of Anambra State, Nigeria.

== Early life ==
Eddy Nawgu was born in Anambra State in Eastern Nigeria, a region predominantly populated by the Igbo people.

== Ministry ==
At the age of 29, Nawgu formed an organization named the 'Anioma Healing Centre' The organization was headquartered at his compound in Nawgu, Anambra State. Throughout the mid-1990s, Eddy Nawgu became a notable religious leader in Onitsha, Anambra State.

== Controversy ==
In the years 1999 and 2000, Nawgu became a person of interest in numerous crimes committed not only in the community, but across Anambra state as a whole. This begun to attract the attention of the Bakassi Boys, a vigilante security group which was set up and spearheaded by Chinwoke Mbadinuju, former governor of Anambra state.

The Bakassi Boys were alleged to harness metaphysical powers referred to as Juju in Nigeria.

Eddie Nawgu had been accused of kidnapping, aiding & abetting infamous criminals, partaking in rituals involving use of human body parts, illegal possession of firearms, and human sacrifice.

== Sorcery ==
The Bakassi Boys failed 13 times to capture Nawgu, and this was explained by the myth that he could defy the rules of conventional physics and had the ability to teleport. According to the Nigerian media, it took the effort of the leader of the vigilante group named Ngwuro to allegedly strip Nawgu of his ability to teleport, leading to his capture.

Nawgu's alias was "Alusi N'eje Uka", translating to "The Deity Who Goes To Church".

== Death ==
Nawgu, when apprehended by the Bakassi Boys, was taken to their base of operation for further questioning and interrogation. He was released to the Nigerian police, to the opposition of the Bakassi boys, who argued that the police were corrupt and could easily be influenced.

High-profile government workers and officials allegedly interceded for the release of Eddy Nawgu as reported by the head of the vigilante group, Mr. Ngwuro; however, the names of the political figures and government officials interceding for his release were never published. He was eventually beheaded and cut to pieces by the Bakassi Boys, after which all the parts were gathered together & set ablaze at the Ochanja Market in Anambra state, Nigeria.

== Legacy ==
In the year he died, many calendars printed in the South-Eastern part of Nigeria bore graphical depictions of his crimes up until his arrest and execution.

== In media ==
- The Nigerian movie titled Onye Amuma was dedicated to Eddy Nawgu, it was a depiction of the rise and fall of Eddy Nawgu. which featured Nkem Owoh playing the role of a false prophet.
- A Nigerian movie produced immediately after the death of Eddy Nawgu by Lancelot Oduwa Imasuen in the year 2000 titled Issakaba, was a movie dedicated to Eddy Nawgu. It had four parts in which the very first part of the movie showed the formation of the vigilante group & also the tremendous effort put into the capturing of Eddy Nawgu, in which the Nigerian actor; Zulu Adigwe played the role of a false prophet.
- In a Nigerian movie titled The Last Prophet which featured the Nigerian actor Zulu Adigwe playing the role of a false prophet was a movie dedicated to Eddy Nawgu.
