= Orabueze =

Orabueze is an African surname. People with the surname include:

- Florence Orabueze (born 1966), Nigerian poet and writer
- Ngozi Orabueze, deputy leader of the declaration restoration of Biafra
