= Basi and Company =

Nigerian TV show

- Genre: Sitcom
- Created by: Ken Saro-Wiwa
- Written by: Ken Saro-Wiwa, Tekena Harry-McDonald, Bob Ejike
- Directed by: Uzorma Onungwa
- Starring: Albert Egbe (1985-1987); Zulu Adigwe (1988-1990); Aso Douglas; Lasa Amoro
- Theme music composer: Eji Oyewole (1985-1988); Zulu Adigwe (1988-1990)
- Country of origin: Nigeria
- Original language: English
- No. of episodes: 150

Production
- Running time: 30 mins

Original release
- Network: NTA
- Release: 1986 – 1990

Basi and Company (also known as Mr. B) is a Nigerian sitcom which ran from 1986 to 1990 on NTA, and was later syndicated across Africa. Written and produced by Ken Saro-Wiwa and filmed in Enugu, the show derived inspiration from African folklore and lampooned widespread corruption in oil-rich Nigeria while highlighting its consequences. To date, it remains one of Africa's most watched comedy programmes, with an estimated thirty million viewers during its peak.

== Plot ==
Set in a pre-419 era, the main character Basi - popularly known as Mr. B - dreams of acquiring wealth through his hare-brained schemes, and his motto is "To be a millionaire, think like a millionaire!". Arriving in Lagos where he believes "the streets are paved with gold", he promptly moves into a dingy room owned by an equally greedy landlady simply known as Madam, a woman who believes all problems can be solved with money, hence her catchphrase "It's a matter of cash!". Despite living on her property, Basi refuses to pay his rent, infuriating Madam who unsuccessfully tries to evict him in nearly every episode. Basi infuriates her further when his dimwitted sidekick Alali moves in without her permission. The duo consistently approach Madam with their deceitful plans to extract money out of her when they are not in their room in order to dodge the rent they can hardly afford.

Dandy, a cunning man who runs a badly-maintained bar on the street, and his friend Boy Josco imitate Basi's get-rich-quick scams, but with little or no success. Segi, a beautiful but devious young lady who lives nearby, is another rival. Their fraudulent and sometimes ridiculous plans include peddling real estate on the moon, rigging the lottery, adding their names to government payrolls despite their unemployed status, persuading radio station to buy fake radio licenses, and forging WAEC results for unsuccessful candidates.

== Cast ==
Actor	Character	Role	Catchphrases
Albert Egbe (Basi #1), Zulu Adigwe (Basi #2)	Basi	Popularly known as "Mr. B", his main ambition in life is enormous wealth without hard graft. In nearly all episodes he is seen wearing a bright red t-shirt with the inscription Mr. B Says To Be A Millionaire... on the front, and ...Think Like A Millionaire on the back. Despite living in his landlady's house for the whole series, he has never paid rent.	To be a millionaire, think like a millionaire! Holy Moses!
Aso Ikpo-Douglas (as Aso Douglas)	Madam	Frequently hailed as "Madam the Madam" (Her real name is never revealed), she proudly flaunts both her wealth and her membership of the women-only American Dollar Club. Equally as greedy as her tenant, she is often the victim of Basi's pranks. She is fond of colossal geles, wearing them in nearly every episode	Come in if you're handsome and rich It's a matter of cash!
Tekena Harry-McDonald	Alali	Also known as Al, he is a malnourished young man who Basi had met at a motor park before inviting him to stay in his room. He takes orders from Mr. B, but is seldom allowed to express his own opinion.	I'm hungry, Mr. B!
Lasa Amoro	Dandy	Nicknamed "Dandy Dandy", he is the owner of a rundown bar with few customers as he never maintains his business. Like Basi, he believes in easy money. In almost every episode he is seen wearing a bowler and bow-tie.	Hell, I should have known that! Can I have a piece of the action?
John Nwobi (Boy Josco #1), Emmanuel Okutuate (Boy Josco #3)	Josco	A homeless man living in a shack under Eko Bridge, often seen with a cigarette in his mouth and hanging out with best friend Dandy. Both attempt to foil Basi's plans to become richer than them, but with no success.	Cool
Affiong Usani (Segi #1), Ethel Ekpe (Segi #2), Mildred Iweka (Segi #3), Timi Zuofa (Segi #4)	Segi	Often described as "The Lady with the Beautiful Eyeballs", Segi - short for Segilola - is friends with Dandy, and the love interest of almost all the male characters. Although sensible, she is somewhat vain and devious.	Ciao!

Following a dispute with creator Saro-Wiwa, Albert Egbe left the series and was replaced by stage actor Zulu Adigwe, despite not bearing a close resemblance to the original actor. The new Mr. B was re-invented as a guitar-strumming layabout who often composed songs about his get-rich-quick schemes. Four different actresses have played the part of Segi, including The 700 Club Nigeria presenter Ethel Ekpe.

Among the show's more successful alumni was Mildred Iweka who had a starring role as Ada Okeke in Nigerian soap Checkmate. Zulu Adigwe was Professor Edem in the pilot episode before he was replaced by Nobert Young. In 1990, Aso Douglas appeared in a commercial for the defunct Abacus Merchant Bank, reprising her famous catchphrase ("It's a matter of cash in your interest!")

== Reactions ==
Former Minister of Information and Culture Tony Momoh praised the use of standard English on the show, as opposed to Nigerian Pidgin which remains dominant on television and has been blamed for the poor command of standard English in the country leading to low scores in WAEC and JAMB English examinations, despite Nigeria's status as an English-speaking nation. Similarly, Roy Jibromah, a marketing manager for Saro-Wiwa's production company, claimed that "children sit glued to the television, with bad English poured down them for four hours a day, [and] they end up with substandard English". Saro-Wiwa stated in an interview in 1987: "We should go for proper English so we can relate to the rest of the world...one reason Basi is so popular is that young people are using it to learn English".

The series was also popular among women who tried to keep up with fashion trends set by the two female characters - Madam and Segi - who often wore traditional African outfits. Aso Douglas, who played Madam and acted as the show's costumer, was famed for her larger-than-life head-ties. However, Douglas told an interview that while she was grateful for the response she received from Nigerian women, she worried that they may be missing the moral lessons of the show

== Merchandise and spin-offs ==
Following the success of Basi and Company, the original cast went on tour across Nigeria. Saro-Wiwa also published a series of books based on the series, including Basi and Company: A Modern African Folktale (1987), Mr. B Again (1989), Segi Finds the Radio (1991), and Mr. B's Mattress (1992), as well as a dramatised version of the book Mr. B: Four Television Plays. Zulu Adigwe released an album under Polygram Nigeria as Mr. B titled Mr. B Hits the Millions, and the main single became the new theme tune of the series before it was cancelled in 1990.
