= Biafra Nations League =

Secessionist group active in Nigeria and Cameroon

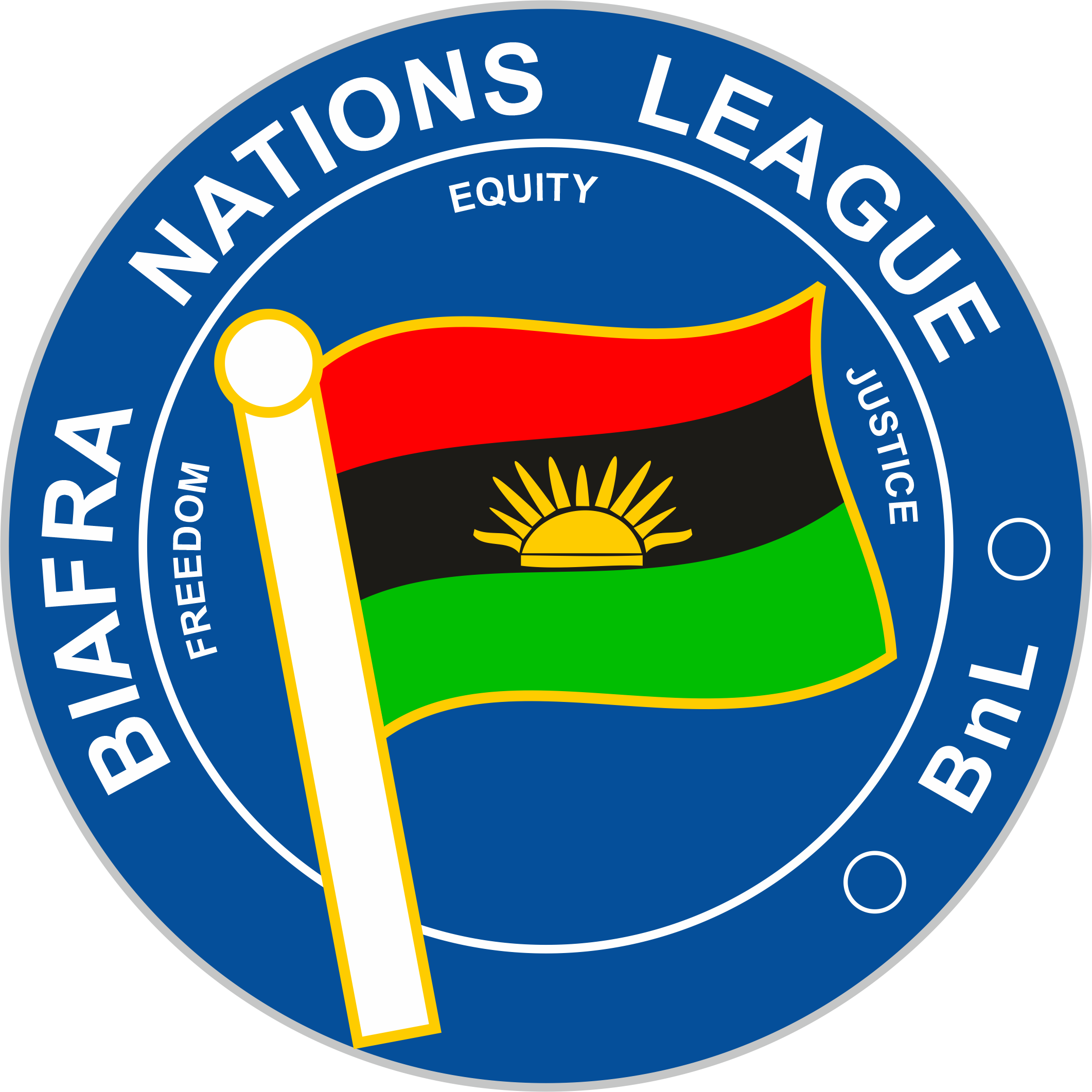
- Abbreviation: BNL
- Leader: Princewill Chimezie Richards; Ebuta Akor Takon; Linus Asuquo Essien; Godstime Ntukidem
- Founded: 2013
- Headquarters: Bakassi Peninsula
- Ideology: Biafran separatism; Biafran nationalism
- Colours: Red, black, green and yellow

Party flag

The Biafra Nations League, initially known as the Biafra Nations Youth League, is a secessionist group in Nigeria's eastern region with operational headquarters in the Bakassi Peninsula. The group was established in Port Harcourt, Rivers State on 3 August 2013.

== Clashes ==
The group is fighting to restore the Republic of Biafra, which includes the Bakassi Peninsula, a region that was ceded to Cameroon by the Nigerian federal government following an International Court of Justice ruling. BNL operates mainly at Cameroon border towns, they have been linked to attacks on Cameroonian Forces in Bakassi by armed groups operating in the water. On 8 November 2021, the BNL took control of the WELCOME TO BAKASSI entrance, a border crossing between Akpabuyo and Bakassi, blocking the road leading to the Peninsula and raising the Biafran flag. The militants retreated before a Nigerian Armed Forces contingent arrived.

BNL banned foreign vessels from entering Nigeria and Cameroon through the Peninsula beginning on 30 May 2021, after its militia loyalists reportedly engaged in a fierce gun battle with Cameroonian Forces. In 2020, the BNL hoisted the Biafran flag in the Cross River border town of Ikom. These activities were carried out by the Ejagham members. On Friday 13 May 2022, suspected militants of BnL attacked the Ikang jetty, in Bakassi Area of Cross River State killing a Police officer and injuring many others, this is barely a week after the Police arrested 23 members of BnL in Ikom.

On Sunday morning, 19 June 2022, in Archibong town (Isangele subdivision), militants suspected to be armed units of BnL shot repeatedly at a foreign speed boat carrying oil equipments to the Nigerian maritime borders in Bakassi Peninsula, a sailor was reportedly killed by flying bullets while security operatives attached to the boat were said to have abandoned the boat and fled. The leader of BnL, Princewill C Richards told Cameroon News Agency that he hasn't spoken to his members to confirm if they were responsible for the attack, adding that his group was still investigating the report

== See also ==
- Indigenous People of Biafra
- Nnamdi Kanu
- Movement for the Actualization of the Sovereign State of Biafra
- Biafra Liberation Army
