= Bakassi Boys =

Vigilante group in south-eastern Nigeria

Bakassi Boys/Anambra State Vigilante Services
- Years active: 1998–2006
- Territory: south-eastern and south-southern Nigeria
- Activities: protective tax, extrajudical executions, intimidating political opponents, vigilantism, militant activism, political corruption, contract killing
- Allies: All Progressives Congress

The Bakassi Boys were a group of Nigerian youth vigilantes who operated majorly in the south-eastern and south-southern regions of Nigeria, between 1998 and 2006. Activities of the vigilante group included targeting perpetrators of armed robberies, ritual killings, kidnapping, such as in the case of Eddy Nawgu, an alleged prophet and occultist whom they killed and beheaded.

The Bakassi Boys were usually armed with machetes and guns, and wear an array of black magic artifacts and Juju around their body. They operate in the Igbo areas of Nigeria and have been accused of extrajudicial killings of suspected petty thieves, armed robbers, ritual killers, murderers, corrupt persons, and generally anyone they considered evil. The manner in which they determined if one was evil or not was allegedly by the use of dark magic, in which they placed a silver-colored machete on the chest of any suspicious person, and if the machete's color changed from silver to blood red it meant the person had committed a heinous crime at some point in their life, and such a person would be killed immediately.

In the south-eastern part of Nigeria, especially Anambra State, they still enjoy popular support in the areas where they operate because certain problems in the region have greatly decreased since the inception of the vigilante group in 1998. According to publications by various Nigerian media houses, they had an alleged magical immunity to gunshots. This metaphysical power was referred to as Odeshi amongst the Igbo people of Nigeria. Odeshi is an Igbo word that loosely translates to "it does not leak" or "it would not leak", which was used to mean that they were impervious to gunshot.

The Bakassi Boys have now rebranded and are now known as Anambra Vigilante Services and have reduced their activities significantly.

== History ==
These groups took their name from the Bakassi peninsula, an oil-rich peninsula in the Annang-Efik-Ibibio region of the coastal south-eastern Nigeria. The Bakassi Boys emerged as a vigilante group simultaneously with sharp increases in the crime rate of Abia State.

They originally enjoyed the support of the governor, Orji Uzor Kalu who appreciated the effectiveness of the group in combating the crimes in Aba and environs. However, as the crime rate was decreasing in Aba, other eastern Igbo cities' crime rates remained the same or were on the increase in some cases. The group then was then reportedly invited to those other cities, including Onitsha and Owerri, to help in the combatting of violent crimes.

In time, law enforcement agencies became regarded as ineffective in the region, and the Bakassi endeared themselves to many Igbo traders and merchants. However, political opponents of some governors accused the group of extrajudicial killings and accused governors of using the Bakassi Boys as weapons of intimidation. As a result of heightened opposition, the group has attempted to rebrand itself as Anambra State Vigilante Services.

== In media ==
A film titled Issakaba, an anagram for Bakassi, was produced in the year 2000 by Lancelot Oduwa Imasuen, and it depicted the origin of the vigilante group and their encounter with Eddy Nawgu.

== See also ==
- Oodua Peoples Congress
- Amotekun
- Derico Nwamama, alleged serial killer assassinated by the group
