= Biafra Referendum =

2024 poll by the Biafra Republic Government in Exile

Biafra self-referendum
- 1 February – 28 November 2024
- Do you approve this proposed declaration of the restoration of the independent state of Biafra, to reestablish the lost sovereign nation of Biafra from Nigeria, which will be called the United States of Biafra (USB)?
- Voting system: Physically and electronically
- Outcome: Declaration of the restoration of Biafra (Note: Government-in-exile may have been made up in order to boost legitimacy.)

Results
Choice	Votes	%
Yes	50,048,916	99.95%
No	23,325	0.05%
Valid votes	50,072,241	100.00%
Invalid or blank votes	0	0.00%
Total votes	50,072,241	100.00%
- Map of the United States of Biafra

The Biafra Referendum, otherwise known as the Biafra self-referendum, was a self-determination poll organized and conducted by the Biafra Republic Government in Exile to determine the declaration of the restoration of Biafra, a partially recognised state in West Africa that declared independence from Nigeria and existed from 1967 until 1970. Following the conclusion of the referendum on 28 November 2024, the restoration of Biafra was declared on 29 November 2024.

== Background ==
Biafra was a nation that declared independence from Nigeria in 1967 under the leadership of the then Eastern Region's military governor, Chukwuemeka Odumegwu Ojukwu. Shortly after the declaration of independence, the Nigerian Civil War ensued as the Nigerian government sought to reclaim the territory of Biafra, culminating in victory for Nigerian forces in 1970.

In May 2023, separatist Simon Ekpa wrote to Finland's former presidents Sauli Niinistö and Tarja Halonen, urging them to support a referendum for Biafra's independence from Nigeria. He submitted over 200 documents highlighting Nigeria's political issues and reminded them of an ongoing ECOWAS Court case initiated by various ethnic groups, including the Coalition of Northern Groups, advocating for a peaceful Biafra exit through a referendum.

In late October 2023, Biafrans hosted by Ekpa and his organization, the Biafra Republic Government in Exile (BRGIE) convened in Helsinki, Finland to discuss the potential for a possible Biafra referendum to reclaim the lost sovereign nation. On 1 February 2024, a self-determination referendum tagged the "Biafra self-referendum" was initiated.

Upon the conclusion of the referendum exercise, the BRGIE was expected to issue a declaration for the restoration of the independent state of Biafra on 2 December 2024, during a convention scheduled from 29 November to 3 December 2024 in Lahti, Finland. The referendum is being conducted both physically and electronically. As of late August, Ekpa says that over 50 million votes have been cast.

According to Ekpa, the referendum is a response to enduring challenges such as marginalization, underdevelopment and insecurity in South East and South South geopolitical zones.

== Reactions ==
On 9 June 2024, the separatist group Indigenous People of Biafra (IPOB) stated that only their leader Nnamdi Kanu could declare a referendum on Biafra. It said that such referendums would be conducted transparently and publicly, adhering to United Nations and African Charter laws, and that no such was ongoing at the time.

In June 2024, the Organization of Emerging African States (OEAS), a group which advises African separatists, stated that the results of the referendum would be binding under international law. It expressed satisfaction with the "referendum's integrity" and acknowledged its alignment with international standards for self-determination. A representative of the Centre for Democracy and Development stated that the OEAS has no authority on the matter and that a referendum would need recognition from the United Nations or major sovereign states.

A writer for the American National Security Journal Michael Rubin said "Thirty million voted, a greater number than those who cast ballots in Nigeria’s most recent presidential elections."

In response to the planned "declaration of the restoration of the independent state of Biafra" on 2 December 2024, the Nigerian government, through the Defence Headquarters (DHQ), stated that it is engaging with the European Union to extradite Simon Ekpa from Finland. Meanwhile, the BRGIE said it is inviting the Nigerian government to the Biafra convention scheduled for the declaration of independence.

== Restoration declaration ==
On 29 November 2024, Biafrans, under the leadership of Simon Ekpa and deputized by Ngozi Orabueze, declared the restoration of Biafra during a convention attended by hundreds of Biafrans. This came after Ekpa was taken into custody just days before the declaration event, on 21 November 2024, for alleged intent to commit terrorism by the Finnish local police in Lahti, Finland.

== Timeline ==
=== 1 February ===
The BRGIE announced the commencement of the referendum and revealed the structure of the proposed 40 "United States of Biafra."

=== 10 February ===
Ekpa said that over two million votes were recorded in the self-referendum within the last ten days.

=== 31 May ===
The BRGIE said that "over 30 million Biafrans have participated in the self-referendum, indicating strong support for secession from Nigeria." Simon Ekpa, the Prime Minister of the BRGIE, stated that this turnout surpassed that of Nigeria's 2023 presidential election.

=== 20 August ===
The BRGIE unveiled the map of the proposed 40 "United States of Biafra" and set 2 December 2024 as the date for its official presentation and declaration.

=== 28 August ===
The Nigerian government, through the Defence Headquarters, said it was working with the European Union to extradite Ekpa for his comments on the presentation of the Biafra map and the official declaration of the restoration of Biafra.

=== 29 November ===
Biafrans convened in Lahti, Finland, and declared the restoration of Biafra's independence, officially known as the United States of Biafra. The declaration, originally scheduled for December 2, 2024, was made earlier due to Ekpa's detention by Finnish police.

== See also ==
- 2014 Venetian independence referendum
- 2014 Scottish independence referendum
- 2020 Puerto Rican status referendum
- Insurgency in Southeastern Nigeria
