= Issakaba =

- Directed by: Lancelot Oduwa Imasuen
- Starring: Sam Dede; Chiwetalu Agu; Pete Eneh; Amaechi Muonagor; Susan Obi
- Release date: 2001
- Country: Nigeria
- Language: English

Issakaba is a 2001 Nigerian film directed by Lancelot Oduwa Imasuen. Loosely based on real events, it depicts a group of vigilantes called the Bakassi Boys fighting crime as well as the alleged sorcerer Eddy Nawgu, who terrorized the Nwagu community in Anambra State.

== Plot ==
The Issakaba boys led by Ebube had to fight against armed robbers who terrorized their society. The armed robbers possess certain mystical powers that they use in their robbery activities. Because of this, Ebube and his team of Issakaba boys also acquired powers that enabled them to fight against robbery.

== Cast ==
- Sam Dede - Ebube
- Chiwetalu Agu - Odiwe
- Pete Eneh - Mbanefo
- Amaechi Muonagor - Igwe
- Susan Obi - Lolo
- Mike Ogundu - Nwoke
- John Okafor
- Andy Chukwu - Danga
- Zulu Adigwe - Ikuku
- Diewait Ikpechukwu - Odogwu
- Remmy Ohajianya
- Emeka Nwafor
- Tom Njemanze - Idoko
- Uche Odoputa - Osita
- Emeka Ani
- Columbus Irosanga

== See also ==
- Derico Nwamama, a bandit whose fictionalised story appears in the film
