= 2023 Anambra ambush =

Ambush on a US consulate convoy in the Ogbaru council area of Anambra state

- Part of the insurgency in Southeastern Nigeria
Date	May 16, 2023
Location	Atani, Anambra, Nigeria
Result	Suspected Biafra separatists victory Ambush Successful

Belligerents
United States; Nigeria	(Republic of Biafra) Biafran separatists (suspected)

Units involved
United States consulate personnel (Nigeria) Anambra State police	(Republic of Biafra) IPOB (alleged by the Anambra State police)

Strength
1 United States consular convoy	Unknown

Casualties and losses
United States consulate personnel: 2–3 killed 1–2 kidnapped Anambra State police: 2–4 killed 2 kidnapped	Unknown

The 2023 Anambra ambush was a violent attack on a United States consular convoy in the town of Atani, in Southeastern Nigeria. Several unidentified assailants opened fire on the convoy as it was traveling along a road, then setting the corpses of the dead and their vehicles on fire. Though the attack caused multiple casualties, none were of American citizens as confirmed by both Nigerian and American authorities. It remains unclear whether or not the attack was specifically targeting the consulate or was intended to target Nigerian security forces in general, though the local police alleged that it was an attack perpetrated by IPOB or its armed branch.

== See also ==
- Attacks on the United States
