= Columbus Irosanga =

Nigerian actor (died 2025)

- Citizenship: Nigeria
- Occupations: Lecturer, Actor

Columbus Irosanga (died 6 February 2025) was a Nigerian actor and television personality who was popularly known for his role as a native doctor in Nollywood films. He was a native of Okrika, Rivers State. He was also a senior lecturer at the Department of Theatre Arts, University of Port Harcourt.

Irosanga died on 6 February 2025, and was survived by wife and his children. Hilda Dokubo announced his death on her Instagram profile.

== Filmography ==
- Issakaba (2001)
- 7 Kilometre
- Otondo
- Amanyanbo: the Eagle King
- Dons in Abuja
