= Ethel Ekpe =

Nigerian actress (1963-2024)

Ethel Aderemi
- Born: Ethel Ekpe; 30 November 1963; Lagos, Nigeria
- Died: 5 February 2024 (aged 60); Sacramento, California, U.S.
- Education: University of Calabar
- Occupation: Actress
- Known for: Portrayal of Segi in Basi and Company
- Relatives: Damilola Adegbite (niece)

Ethel Aderemi (née Ekpe; 30 November 1963 – 5 February 2024) was a Nigerian actress.

== Career ==
Aderemi was born the youngest of 5 children on 30 November 1963 in Lagos to civil servant parents. She graduated from the University of Calabar. She was the second actress cast as Segi in Basi and Company, and appeared alongside Patrick Doyle in the video for Lorrine Okotie's Love Medicine. She also had roles in Forever by Amaka Igwe and Sons of the Caliphate, along with Heartbeats by Aguila Njamah, Speak the Word by Tchidi Chikere and Traumatised by Lancelot Oduwa Imasuen.

== Personal life and death ==
She was of Yoruba ethnicity and a Christian. She was married. Ethel Aderemi was Damilola Adegbite's aunt. Diagnosed with cancer in late 2023, Aderemi died of this illness in Sacramento, California, where she resided, on 5 February 2024, at the age of 60.

== Selected filmography ==
- Basi And Company as Segi
- Forever
- Sons of The Caliphate as Dr. Philomena Lot
- Heartbeats as Mrs. Momoh
- Speak the Word as Alice
- Traumatised as Mrs. Bassey
- Speak the Word 2
- Forever 2
