= Derico Nwamama =

Nigerian bandit

- Born: Okwudili Ndiwe; 1979; Anambra State
- Died: 9 July 2001 (aged 21–22); Ochanja market, Anambra State
- Cause of death: Execution (Decapitation)
- Other name: Derico
- Citizenship: Nigerian
- Occupation: Serial killer
- Years active: 2000 — 2001
- Conviction: Guilt
- Criminal charges: Genocide; Armed robbery, Serial killer
- Accomplice: Chiejina

Details
- Victims: 25 Policemen; 100 civilians
- Span of crimes: 2000 – 2001
- Country: Nigeria
- State: Anambra State
- Locations: Onitsha; Nnewi; Nkpor; Umuleri; Ihiala
- Date apprehended: 3 July 2001

Okwudili Ndiwe predominantly known as Derico Nwamama was a Nigerian serial killer and armed robber. He terrorised Anambra state from 2000 until he was apprehended by the Bakassi Boys in 2001.

== Early life ==
Nwamama started off as a pickpocket and street urchin. He transformed into an armed robber during the tenure of governor Chinwoke Mbadinuju at the age of 22. He started off by robbing market women and banks. He was reported to have killed 25 policemen and at least 100 civilians during his crime span.

== Death ==
After all trials by the Nigerian police force to nab Nwamama proved abortive, governor Mbadinuju invited the Bakassi Boys to take over. On 3 July 2001, the Bakassi Boys got an intel that Nwamama was coming to Onitsha, they laid an ambush, intercepting him at Nkpor. 6 days later, on 9 July 2001, the Bakassi Boys paraded Nwamama at the Ochanja market before beheading him with a machete.

== In popular culture ==
A film titled Issakaba, an anagram for the Bakassi Boys, was produced in 2001 by Lancelot Oduwa Imasuen, and it depicted the origin of the vigilante group and their encounter with Nwamama.
