= Zulu Adigwe =

Nigerian actor (died 2024)

- Born: 27 June 1945; Enugu, Eastern Region, Nigeria
- Died: 23 April 2024 (aged 78)
- Education: University of Ibadan
- Occupation: Actor
- Years active: 1988–2024
- Known for: Blood Diamonds (2004); Unforgetable (2003); Issakaba (1999)
- Television: Checkmate; Basi & Company

Joseph Zulu Adigwe (27 June 1945 – 23 April 2024) was a Nigerian actor and singer, best known for paternal roles in Nollywood films. He first achieved fame as Mr. B in the sitcom Basi and Company, and later appeared in the 2019 film Living in Bondage: Breaking Free.

== Early life ==
Adigwe was born in Enugu where he spent most of his childhood but moved to Austria where he attended primary and secondary school. Prior to acting he studied French and German, worked as a teacher, and briefly studied medicine before returning to Nigeria after his father's death. He enrolled with the University of Ibadan where he studied theatre arts, graduating with first-class honours.

== Career ==
Adigwe's interest in acting started when he was seven. His earliest appearance on Nigerian television was in Basi and Company where he played the lead character Mr. B, replacing former actor Albert Egbe who left the series after a dispute with the show's creator Ken Saro-Wiwa. Adigwe's introduction to the cast saw Mr. B re-invented as a guitar-strumming layabout composing and singing get-rich-quick ditties. He also performed a new theme song for Basi and Company, and an album coinciding with the series, Mr. B Makes His Millions, was released by Polygram Nigeria in 1990.

In 1991, Adigwe was among the original cast of Checkmate, playing lecherous university lecturer Monday Edem in the pilot episode, but the role was recast after production moved from Enugu to Lagos. His first film was Blood of the Orphan, which earned him acclamation and recognition. In 2004, he starred in Living Abroad, directed by Elvis Chuks and also featuring Ernest Asuzu, Emeka Enyiocha, and Anne Njemanze. In 2019, Adigwe appeared as Pascal Nworie in Living in Bondage: Breaking Free.

== Death ==
Adigwe died on 23 April 2024.

== Filmography ==
=== Film ===
| Year | Title | Role | Director | Notes |
|---|---|---|---|---|
| 2019 | Living in Bondage: Breaking Free | Pascal Nworie | Ramsey Nouah | |
| 2019 | 45 Minutes | Actor | Alvin Mic Master | |
| 2018 | Feast of Love | | Kensteve Anuka | |
| 2015 | The Powerful Baby | Udemme | Nonso Emekaekwue | |
| 2006 | The Grandmasters 1 & 2 | Guru | | |
| 2006 | My Promise 1 & 2 | | | |
| 2006 | City of Kings 1 & 2 | Bernards | | |
| 2006 | Divided Heart 1 & 2 | | | |
| 2005 | Bigger Boys 1 & 2 | Actor | | |
| 2005 | After Dawn 1 & 2 | Actor | | |
| 2005 | Gods of Liberation 1 & 2 | Actor | | |
| 2004 | Living Abroad | Actor | Elvis Chuks | |
| 2003 | Blood Diamonds 1 & 2 | Actor | Teco Benson | |
| 2003 | Top Secret | Actor | | |
| 2003 | Unforgetable 1 & 2 | Actor | Osita Okoli | |
| 2003 | The Kingmaker | Actor | | |
| 2003 | My Only Love | Fr. Nwachukwu | | |
| 2000 | Issakaba 2 | Actor | Lancelot Oduwa Imasuen | |
| 1999 | Issakaba | Actor | Lancelot Oduwa Imasuen | |
| 1999 | Endtime 1 & 2 | Actor | | |
| 1999 | Face of a Liar 1 & 2 | Actor | | |
| | Last Ofalla | Actor | | |

=== Television ===
| Year | Title | Role | Director | Notes |
|---|---|---|---|---|
| 1988–1990 | Basi and Company | "Mr B" | | |
| 1991 | Checkmate | Professor Monday Edem #1 | | |

== See also ==
- List of Nigerian actors
