= Albert Egbe =

Nigerian actor and producer

- Born: Albert Egbe; Delta State, Nigeria
- Education: University of Ibadan
- Occupation: Actor

Albert Egbe is a Nigerian actor and producer best known for his TV roles as the original Mr. B. in Basi and Company, and Baba TC in The Thrift Collector. He was an elected executive member of the Pan African Federation of Filmmakers Congress in 2006. After Basi & Company, he built a career in entertainment by producing short films and television movies, many of which are adaptations of literary works by Nigerian writers.

== Early life ==
Egbe was born in Warri, Delta State to parents of Itsekiri ancestry. He attended St Gregory's College, Lagos, and from 1961 to 1965 he studied Latin at the University of Ibadan where he met Ken Saro-Wiwa; both were members of a traveling theatre group at the university and participated in drama productions on campus. After graduation, Egbe worked as an administration officer with the Nigerian Federal Government, remaining in that position for a few years before changing his career. Egbe took Accounting courses in London, and upon returning home he worked as an accountant with Deloitte and later Michelin Nigeria. He dabbled in managing a small business, but quit to pursue acting.

== Career ==
Egbe's breakthrough role was as the title character in Basi and Company, portraying a slothful young man in the city planning easy money schemes. Prior to Basi, he appeared in the television series The New Masquerade and The Village Headmaster. Egbe left Basi and Company halfway through production following a dispute with the creator Ken Saro-Wiwa, and produced the television series Jagua Nana's Daughter based on the Cyprian Ekwensi novel. Other literary adaptations included Rasheed Gbadamosi's The Tree Grows in the Desert and Ola Rotimi's Our Husband Has Gone Mad Again.

In 1996, Egbe was cast as Baba TC in the UNFPA production The Thrift Collector, an isusu agent who consistently found himself involved in his syndicate members' personal issues including poverty, STDs, HIV, and family planning. Produced by Ladi Ladebo, Thrift Collector was one of three productions selected by the Rotterdam Museum of Ethnology as Best TV Soaps on Population and Development.

From 1999 to 2003, Egbe managed the Independent Television Producers Association of Nigeria training school in Lagos. He was a screenwriter on M-Net's Twins of the Rain Forest, and is currently planning to produce a film on Itsekiri warlord Nana Olomu.

== See also ==
- List of Nigerian film producers
