= Akpawfu =

Town in Enugu State, Nigeria

Akpawfu (or Akpofu) is a town in Nkanu East Local Government Area of Enugu State, Nigeria.

It is made up of seven autonomous communities:

In May 2025 Isiagu chose Igwe Tony Ike Okoye as the traditional ruler. A report was made alleging unrest following the choice. Community leaders issued a statement asserting there was no tension in the community.

The traditional ruler of Obodo Uvuru is Igwe Dume Nnamoko (Uvuru 1 of Obodo Uvuru) while the traditional ruler of Ajame-agu is Igwe Christopher O. Nnamani (Amaeze 1 of Ajame-Amaeze).

In August 2025, Governor Peter Mbah visited the town to inaugurate the Akpawfu Smart Green School, launch a farm estate, and inspect ongoing road construction.

About 90% of the populace are literate, 95% of the communities are Christians. It central success is figured in agricultural productions. It has an estimated population of 150,000. As of 2025 the town is undeveloped, roads are untarred, there is not a medical facility, and there is no phone or internet service.

It has two main streams: Iyaba and Etavu. Akpawfu is bordered by the towns of Amagunze, Akpugo and Oruku. Ovu lake, the largest lake in Enugu state, is by the town. Other lakes in Akpawfu include: Offia lake, Ururo-naka lake and Ururo-ode lake.
