= Ekwulobia Prison =

Federal medium security prison

Ekwulobia Prison is a federal medium security prison sited closely to the former vice President Alex Ekwueme's Oko Community in Aguata Local Government Area of Anambra State, Nigeria. The prison which was the only infrastructure given to the Ekwulobia community during the Shagari era in the second republic, has an operational housing capacity of 85 inmates.

The facility was opened in 2010 and initially had 25 prisoners. The capacity of the prison is 80 persons and the prison had about 204 inmates as of 2019. It was also made known that 165 persons were registered as awaiting trial inmates.

In June 2015, it was reported that 47 Boko Haram suspects had been transferred to the prison on orders of President Buhari. Following the public outcry from the community residents, Anambra State traders, representative of the Aguata constituency and civic associations, the Boko Haram suspects were relocated out of the prison in October 2015.

In December 2018, the present Anambra State Governor, Willie Obiano granted 10 prison inmates in the Ekwulobia Prison, state pardon during a Mass celebration held within the prison premises.
