= Simon Ekpa =

Nigerian-Finnish politician, businessman and Biafran political activist

- Born: 21 March 1985 (age 41); Ohaukwu, Ebonyi State, Nigeria
- Citizenship: Finnish
- Occupations: Politician; businessman
- Years active: 2012–present: Detained by the Finnish Authorities as of November 2024 and let go on parole November 2026
- Organizations: Biafra Republic Government in Exile (BRGIE); Biafra Defence Forces (BDF); Biafra Liberation Army (BLA)
- Known for: Biafra restoration
- Political party: National Coalition Party
- Movement: Independence of Biafra
- Opponent: The Nigerian state
- Awards: Ambassador for Peace

Simon Njoku Ekpa (born 21 March 1985) is a Finnish politician and Biafran political activist. In 2022, while in Finland, he declared the activation of the Biafra Government In Exile (BGIE), and in 2023 declared himself the leader (titled "Prime Minister") of the Biafra Republic Government in Exile (BRGIE). (Note: BRGIE works for the total independence and reinstatement of Biafra, a short-lived state in West Africa, which existed from 1967 until 1970.) In September 2025, he was sentenced to six years in prison on terrorism-related charges, later reduced to four years.

== Life, education and career ==
Simon Ekpa was born on 21 March 1985, in Ohaukwu, Ebonyi State, in southeastern Nigeria. Ebonyi State had previously been part of Biafra, a partially recognized state that declared independence from Nigeria and existed from 1967 until 1970.

He won the Triple Jump silver medal for Nigeria at the 2003 African Junior Athletics Championships in Cameroon. He left athletics because of a knee problem. In September 2021, Ekpa denounced Nigeria and said he would return the medal, and renounced his Nigerian citizenship the following year. In July 2024, he said he had returned the medals to the Nigerian Ministry of Foreign Affairs.

Since 2007, he has lived with his family in Lahti, Finland. He learned Finnish, became a citizen and did military service in the Finnish military at the Häme Regiment in Hennala in 2013 as well as a reservist in the Finnish Army. Ekpa joined the Finnish politics in 2012 and has been active since then. He was the Chairman of the Igbo Union Finland from 2015 until 2019. He has also served as the Chairman of the Playground Board, in the City Lahti, a position he held between 2017 until 2021.

Ekpa ran as a candidate in the 2017 Finnish municipal elections and was also a candidate in the 2022 Finnish county elections under the National Coalition Party of Finland. As of 2023, he serves as a public transport officer for the Lahti region. Yle has referred to him as a businessman. In 2023, the Universal Peace Federation awarded Ekpa Ambassador for Peace at the African Day Celebration in Helsinki, Finland.

=== Legal work ===
Since 2009, Ekpa has worked in the legal field, including as a legal advisor. However, Ekpa is not an attorney in Finland and does not represent his own clients in court. Ekpa became familiar with the legal field while on internship at his ex-wife's law office.

Ekpa has stated that he is an expert, a legal advisor, and has a Master of Law (LLM) degree from the Welsh Aberystwyth University, but upon inquiry by Yle, the university didn't give any information about the degree. Ekpa has no apparent lower or higher legal degree.

== Activism and separatism ==
Simon Ekpa became active in the "Biafra independence movement" in 2019. He was noticed by the Nigerian media after he posted a video claiming that Nigerian soldiers had been killed by Boko Haram. According to a Nigerian rights attorney, the purpose was to "disillusion Nigerians especially soldiers to resign from the Army".

In July 2021, Ekpa was announced the lead broadcaster for Radio Biafra, associated with the separatist organisation Indigenous People of Biafra (IPOB) after the arrest of its leader, Nnamdi Kanu. However, Ekpa was not allowed to broadcast for violation of the rules of the organisation. In 2022, IPOB accused Ekpa of illegal activities and stated that IPOB was a peaceful organization. In July 2023, the Daily Post said that Ekpa led a faction of IPOB, as did Premium Times in May 2024. According to Ekpa, IPOB was dissolved in a vote, renamed "Autopilot", and he became its spokesman. In August 2022, Ekpa declared "full activation" of the Biafran Government in Exile. He said: "we also wish to officially announce an alliance and activation of Biafra Government In Exile (BGIE) with the IPOB-Autopilot." In April 2023, he announced that he had been appointed as the prime minister of the Biafra Republic Government in Exile (BRGIE). Nigerian news media have variously referred to him as "prime minister" or "self-acclaimed prime minister" of the government-in-exile. Ekpa stated in 2023 that "Biafra Republic Government In-Exile is registered, approved and legal. Agent of Nigeria, take note!" As of 2024, it has a main office in Maryland, US. IPOB called the BRGIE "double agents sponsored by the Nigerian government to ridicule the IPOB movement". Suomen Kuvalehti said in 2024 that "Be it as it may, Ekpa is now at least the prime minister by some."

Zubairu Dada, Nigerian minister, said the same year that "When [Ekpa] gives instructions, destruction follows. They cause killing, maiming, fires, whatever." Nigerian general Christopher Gwabin Musa said "In the South-east, Simon Ekpa has become a menace to this country. The country must act on it diplomatically. [Ekpa] is having a freeway because [Finland] are encouraging him to do what he is doing. His utterances and actions are affecting what is happening in Nigeria." Ekpa said in 2024 that he is in daily contact with Kanu.

According to a report from Yle, Ekpa's activism started to gather mainstream attention in February 2023. The local Kokoomus party in Lahti stated that it had started an internal investigation of these claims. A representative of the association Igbo Union Finland said: "He should stop inciting hatred and provoking. Ekpa does not represent the Igbo people of Finland". The Nigerian government has also demanded Finland stop Ekpa's activities. Yle interviews with residents of Enugu suggested extensive fear of Ekpa and compliance with his "sit at home" orders which involved the 2023 Nigerian elections. In late February 2023 Yle reported Ekpa is being suspected of having raised funds in an illegal manner by the Finnish National Bureau of Investigation. As of early 2023, his speeches on Twitter had around 800,000 views.

In December 2022, Ekpa declared a five-day sit at home civil disobedience campaign in the southeast and parts of southern Nigeria from 9 to 14 December 2022. On 14 June 2023, Ekpa announced a week-long sit at home campaign from 3 to 10 July 2023, which according to The Whistler recorded 70% compliance. The sit-at-homes have been enforced by gunmen.

In 2023, he declared that the 2023 Nigerian general election would not be held in the Biafra region that year.

Ekpa continued Kanu's sit-at-home orders, to protest the imprisonment of Kanu. In July 2023, he threatened that oil exploitations in the Biafra region would be stopped if Kanu wasn't to be released. However, Ekpa exonerated Kanu from the activities of the Biafra agitations. He said Kanu wasn't responsible for the actions taken to free him. The head of ACLED's Nigerian branch criticizes 'Ekpa's faction' for attacking those not following this curfew. Ekpa denies violence against civilians, by stating "After the creation of the defensive forces, government forces no longer encroach on our area, because we have manpower all over, that protect".

The Nigerian senate asked Finland to extradite Ekpa in July 2023. In May 2024, BRGIE declared a three-day sit at home from 29 to 31 May. Ekpa said it was "necessary to enable Biafrans vote for the Liberation of Biafra". IPOB disagreed on the date, having earlier declared their own sit at home on 30 May. The conflicting messages caused confusion and fear of violence in the region. The police and military said that people should go about their lawful business.

In October 2023, Ekpa and cabinet members of BRGIE hosted a three-day convention in Helsinki, Finland, where a possible Biafran referendum was discussed with participants and attendants from Biafra. In early February 2024, BRGIE announced the commencement of the Biafra Referendum and revealed the structure of the proposed independent state of Biafra.

BRGIE has stated that it intends to issue a "declaration of Biafra independent state" in late 2024, and that this declaration will bring peace and stability to the West African region. Ekpa said mid-2024 that over 30 million votes had been recorded in an online voting "self-referendum" regarding the sovereignty of Biafra and as of July 2024, he said "over 49 million Biafrans have voted in the ongoing self-referendum". In June 2024, the Organisation of Emerging African States (OEAS), a group that counsels African separatists, said that "the BRGIE referendum further consolidated the self-determination pursuit of the people of Biafra amid decades of alleged marginalization by the Nigerian government." According to Ekpa, only BRGIE has the legitimate right to call for "Biafra's declaration".

At the three-day convention he also announced the formation of the Biafra Liberation Army (BLA), a militant group fighting for secession from Nigeria. He had previously claimed to control the Eastern Security Network, IPOB's armed wing, and said this group was renamed BLA. BLA was suspected to have killed a police officer in Imo State in November 2023. According to Ekpa, it has a hundred thousand soldiers. IPOB disassociated itself from the BLA.

Yle had in February 2023 reported that estimates of the number of gunmen loyal to Ekpa vary greatly, from hundreds to tens of thousands. In late 2023, Ekpa and Ambazonian activist Ayaba Cho Lucas announced a military pact between their respective organizations against the Cameroonian and Nigerian governments. In June 2024, Ekpa signed a one-year agreement to be represented by the American lobbying firm Moran Global Strategies.

In March 2024, the Nigerian Defence Headquarters (DHQ) declared Ekpa and more than 90 others "wanted" for "terrorism, kidnapping and other crimes." Ekpa responded that he had nothing to do with Nigeria, and declared other people "wanted" in his turn. In May 2024, the African Court on Human and Peoples' Rights in Banjul, the judicial arm of the African Union (AU), acknowledged a petition by the BRGIE regarding Kanu and a declaration of the restoration of independent state of Biafra.

In May 2024, Ekpa urged the Nigerian government to engage the Finnish government to mediate in the conflict between BLA and the Nigerian army. In June 2024, a former director of the Nigerian State Security Service called for the extradition of Ekpa to Nigeria. He urged the Nigerian government to initiate negotiations with Finnish authorities to repatriate Ekpa. Nigeria's Chief of Defence Staff Musa also reiterated the call for the arrest and prosecution of Ekpa. He accused the Finnish government and the European union of shielding Ekpa, thereby preventing his arrest.

On 30 July 2024, the Biafra Defence Forces killed four Nigerian police operatives. Ekpa classified them as "terrorists" and declared that they should be withdrawn from the Biafran region.

In August 2024, Simon Ekpa and the Biafra Republic Government in Exile ordered 30 days lockdown of the Nigerian government institutions in the South East region, from 28 August to 26 September, excluding private businesses. This action responds to the continued detention of Nnamdi Kanu and alleged killings of Christians and Biafrans. Ekpa demands Kanu's release and the withdrawal of Nigerian security forces from the region.

On 20 August 2024, Ekpa unveiled the map of a proposed 40 "United States of Biafra" and announced 2 December 2024 as the date for its official presentation and issuance of a declaration of independence. Declaration happened on 29 November. The Nigerian government, while reacting to the development through the Defence Headquarters (DHQ), stated that it is engaging with the European Union to extradite Ekpa from Finland. In response, the Biafra Republic Government in Exile says it is inviting the Nigerian government to the Biafra restoration declaration convention in Finland for possible dialogue.

== Arrest and trial ==
In November 2024, Ekpa was detained by the Finnish National Bureau of Investigation (NBI), on accusations of terrorist activities in Nigeria. Finnish police said the accusations were under investigation and involved international cooperation. The NBI also arrested four others over alleged terrorist offenses. In January 2025, The Nation reported that two out of the four individuals arrested alongside Ekpa had been released.

Ekpa was remanded into custody by the District Court of Päijät-Häme on suspicion of public incitement to commit a crime with terrorist intent. He is suspected of committing the crime between 23 August 2021, and 18 November 2024. According to the report, the NBI has frozen his assets, those of his accomplices, and the assets of companies associated with him. This marks his second arrest in Finland; he was previously detained in 2023 on suspicion of illegal fundraising but was released shortly after.

On 3 December 2024, hundreds of Biafrans, who consider Ekpa their Prime Minister, gathered in Lahti to protest against the arrest. His deputy Ngozi Orabueze said that the sit-at-homes championed by Ekpa would continue. She expressed her commitment to ensuring Ekpa's release. In February 2025, Orabueze described herself as deputy prime minister and chief of staff of the United States of Biafra (USB), and Ekpa as the prime minister of that organization. According to the Daily Post as of March 2025, Ogechukwu Nkere is known as the acting prime minister of BRGIE.

President Bola Tinubu commended the Finnish authorities for the arrest. The Finnish Ambassador to Nigeria stated, "Simon Ekpa has been hindering bilateral relations. The cooperation between our two countries is going very well now, and the National Security Adviser has been providing all the evidence.” The statement was made as the Ambassador presented her letter of credence to Tinubu in Abuja. OEAS condemned the arrest and accused Finland of partnering with Nigeria to detain him.

At a preparatory hearing in late May, the prosecutor demanded a six-year prison sentence for various crimes, including participating in a terrorist organisation and tax fraud. Ekpa denied all charges, but admitted a minor tax offence. BRGIE declared a two day lockdown in southeastern Nigeria to mark the hearing.

=== District Court's Sentencing ===
In September 2025, Ekpa was sentenced to six years in prison. He was found guilty of terrorism-related charges, including supplying armed groups in Nigeria with weapons, and encouraging his followers to commit crimes in the country. He was also convicted of aggravated tax fraud, and claiming to be a practising attorney without authorisation. The court stated that Ekpa's crimes had occurred between August 2021 and November 2024.

Ekpa was also convicted of tax fraud and ordered to pay €29,549 to the state. Ekpa founded a company called Freedom Stream Oy in 2024, a video production company in addition to his earlier founded Ekpa & Co Oy, a law practise. Both of these were deemed to have generated income taxable in Finland, but were not properly reported to the tax authorities. The court deemed Ekpa had earned €67,814 from Google Ireland, but not reported this income to the tax authorities. He was reported to have sizable incomes from abroad.

Ekpa's sentence was not enforced during his right to appeal to the court of appeal (hovioikeus). By 22 October, Ekpa had filed an appeal on the judgment of the district court, and remained in remand detention. The prosecutors also appealed, asking for an increased sentence.

=== Appeals Court case ===
In October 2026, the Court of Appeals largely upheld the previous sentence, but reduced it to 4 years from 6. The sentence can be appealed to the Supreme Court of Finland. Suomen Kuvalehti reported that in order to investigate the alledged deeds by Ekpa, the Finnish state has employed investigative resources via its embassy in Nigeria. Ekpa had argued in court that Nigeria is in a state of civil war and that because of this, his actions cannot be considered of a terrorist nature. The court took Ekpa's views into account, conducted an thorough investigation, but also concluded it cannot conduct an investigation as comprehensively as it would've liked. This benefited Ekpa in getting a reduction. He further argued in court, his role as 'commander' had been ceremonial and not terrorist in intent. He denied being the leader of the organization attempting to break away Biafra from Nigeria. Ekpa's lawyer Tommi Heinonen told media, Ekpa will seek to try the case at the Supreme Court. He also said Ekpa would be freed from prison within about a month to serve the rest of his sentence under parole. Which is possible in Finland if the convicted has served half his prison sentence.

=== Supreme Court case ===
On 18 November 2026, Ekpa was released from custody. On the same day the Deputy Prosecutor General applied to the Supreme Court for leave to appeal the Court of Appeals´ sentence. The Deputy Prosecutor General is seeking a harsher sentence and a precedent on the assessment of terrorism offences. Ekpa´s lawyer commented that they would likely also seek leave to appeal.

== See also ==
- Igbo nationalism
- Movement for the Actualization of the Sovereign State of Biafra
- Nigerians in Finland
