= Nigerian Army Band Corps =

Military band of the Nigerian Army

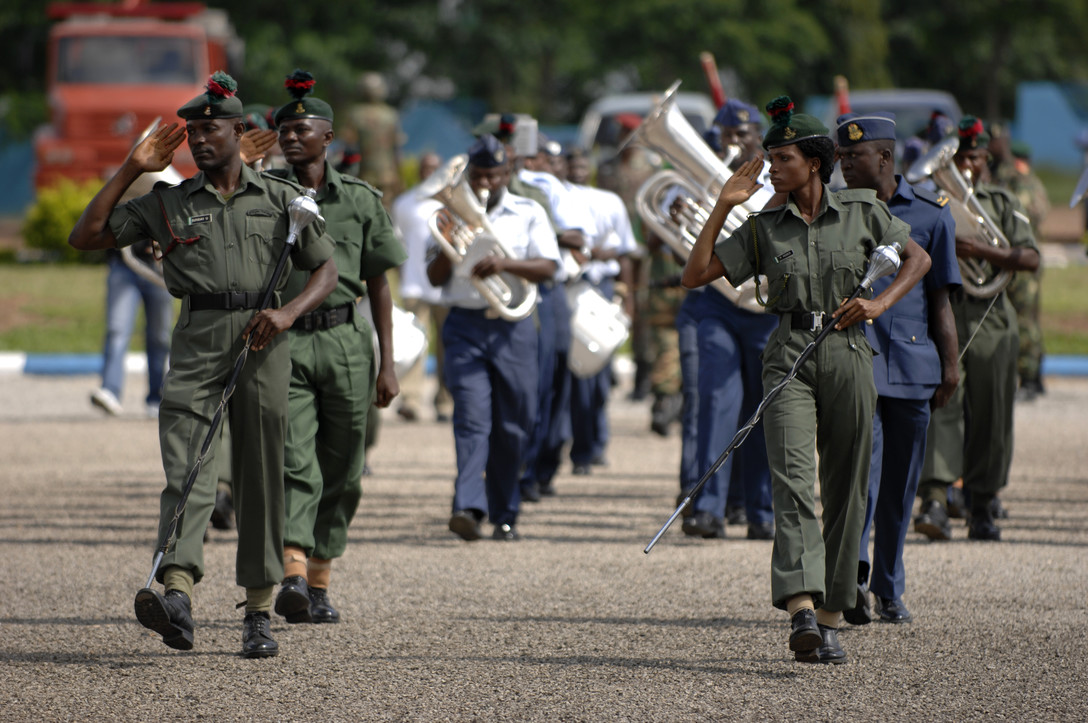
- Drum majors from the NABC during the Africa Endeavor 2008 opening ceremony.
- Active: 1932 - present
- Country: Nigeria
- Branch: Nigerian Army
- Type: Military Band
- Role: Brass music; Folk music
- Part of: Directorate of Music
- Headquarters: Ojuelegba, Lagos, Nigeria
- Nickname: NABC

Commanders
- Director of Music: Colonel O.G. Olaniyi

The Nigerian Army Band Corps (NABC) is the official military band branch of the Nigerian Army. It is roughly the equivalent of the Royal Corps of Army Music of the British Army, the Music Branch of the Canadian Forces, and the Australian Army Band Corps.

== History ==
It was founded as a regimental band in 1932, with Captain J. Cooper from the Royal Life Guards Band in London originally leading the band. In 1935, the NABC was converted into a full-fledged military band, being part of the Royal West African Frontier Force (RWAFF). Two years before the country's independence in 1960, the band was transferred from its rehearsal space in Kaduna to Abalti Barracks in Lagos. As part of the government policy of the replacement British citizens with native Nigerians in public roles, Captain Cooper was replaced in 1964 by Lieutenant Colonel Josef Olubobokun (1930–2015), who became the first native Nigerian to lead the corps. During his tenure, he would become instrumental in the establishment of institutions such as the Nigerian Army School of Music.

== List of bands ==
- HQ Band of the Nigerian Army Band Corps
- Army Headquarters Garrison Band
- Guards Brigade Band
  - Presidential Pipe Band
- HQ 9th Brigade Band
- HQ 32nd Field Artillery Brigade
- 1st Division Band
- 2nd Division Band
- 3rd Armoured Division Band
- 6th Division Band
- 7th Division Band
- 8th Division Band
- 81st Division Band
- 82nd Division Band
- HQ Band of the Army School of Music
- Nigerian Army Steel Band

=== Army Steel Band ===
The Nigerian Army Steel Band was established in 1977. It was established following FESTAC 77 in Lagos, after which the Nigerian military were gifted the steelpan instruments assembled by the Trinidad and Tobago Starlift Steel Orchestra for their performance at the festival. Since then, the Nigerian Army has periodically sent bandsmen to the Trinidad and Tobago for specialized training in pan performance.

== Army School of Music ==
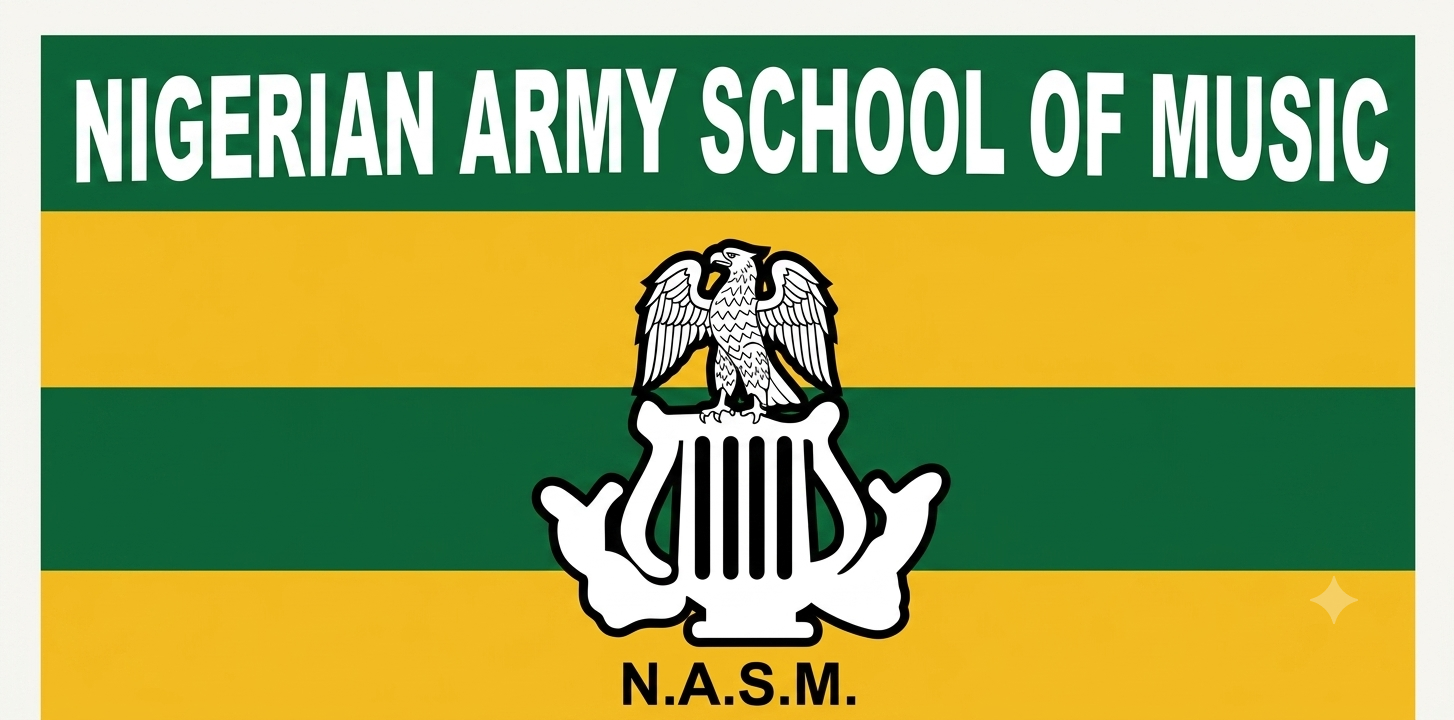
Logo of the Nigerian Army School of Music

The Army School of Music (NASM) is a part of the corps that is also a branch of the Training and Doctrine Command (TRADOC). In 1987, the Nigerian Television Authority, at Victoria Island featured instructors from both the Nigerian Army and Navy Schools of Music on its educational program on various band instruments.

NASM has several departments, including:

- Wind Band Department
- Brass Band Department
- Percussion Department
- String Department
- Music Theory Department

== Characteristics ==
Musical accompaniment provided by corps ranges from jazz and traditional music to military and classical music. It order to be eligible to serve in the corps, one would have to be aged between 18 and 26, as well as have a height of 168 cm (5 ft 6 in) for male members (162 cm (5 ft 4 in) for female members) and a knowledge of Nigerian regional languages, aside from capability in playing musical instruments.

== Directors of Music ==
- Captain J. Cooper (1932-1964)
- Colonel Josef Olubobokun (1964-16 January 1984)
- Lieutenant Colonel A.G. Ugwunze (16 January 1984-)
- Lieutenant Colonel Timothy Eru
- Lieutenant Colonel Sati
- Brigadier General Luckson Amaechi
- Colonel Gerald Nwasike
- Colonel O.G. Olaniyi (11 December 2019-Till Date)
- Lieutenant Colonel A.G. Leku (19 February 2019-18 December 2019)
- Lieutenant Colonel J. E Evans
- Lieutenant Colonel J Aziekwu
- Lt Colonel Michael Toriola (October 18, 2024 - Present)

== See also ==
- Presidential Guard Brigade (Nigeria)
- Presidential Guard (Zimbabwe)
- The Funkees
