= 9th Brigade (Nigeria) =

9 Brigade
- Country: Nigeria
- Branch: Nigerian Army
- Type: Infantry
- Size: Brigade
- Part of: 81 Division
- Garrison/HQ: TA Lagbaja Cantonment, Ikeja, Lagos State

Commanders
- Current commander: Brigadier General Ayokunle Owolabi

9 Brigade is an infantry formation of the Nigerian Army. Headquartered in Ikeja, Lagos State, the brigade operates under 81 Division.

== History ==
For many years, the brigade operated under 2nd Mechanised Division in Ibadan. In 2002, when the 81st Division was created, 9th Brigade was permanently reassigned to the division. The 9th Brigade took part in the Benin Independence Day Parade on Amazone Square in Cotonou.

== Units ==
- Headquarters
  - Brigade Medical Centre, Onigbongbo
- 149 Battalion
- 19th Mechanised Battalion
- 192 Battalion

== Commanders ==
- Brigadier General Taoreed Lagbaja (2018–2019)
- Brigadier General Sale Kawugana (? - May 6, 2021)
- Brigadier General Lader Saraso (May 6, 2021 – 2022)
- Brigadier General Isangubong Akpaumontia (2022 – May 12, 2023)
- Brigadier General Nsikak Edet (May 12, 2023 – 2024)
- Brigadier General Olawale Oyekola (2024 – November 2025)
- Brigadier General Ayokunle Owolabi (November 2025 – Present)

== See also ==
- Nigerian Armed Forces
- 81st Division (Nigeria)
