= Independence Day (Benin) =

National holiday in Benin

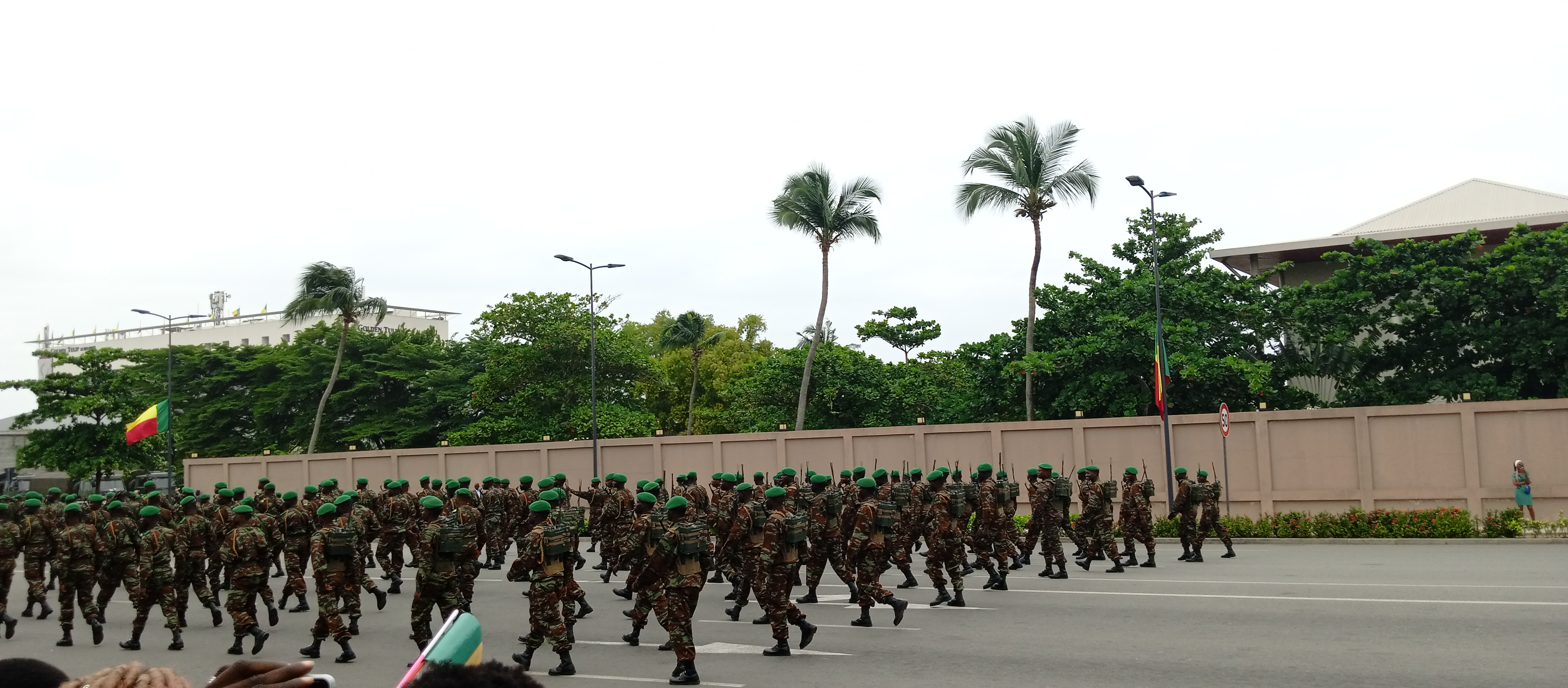
Military parade in 2024.

Independence Day (French: Jour de l'Indépendance) is the national holiday of Benin, formerly the Republic of Dahomey (1958–1975), celebrated on 1 August.

== History ==
The first Independence Day in 1960 saw President Hubert Maga deliver the speech of independence of Dahomey in Porto-Novo, the capital, on the field between the Legislative Assembly of the time and the residence of the High Commissioner (now the National Assembly building), accompanied by 101 gun salute.

== Celebrations ==
In 2009, the city of Lokossa in the Mono Department hosted the event. The 50th anniversary of independence in 2010 was commemorated with ten African heads of state as well as the French Minister of the Interior, Brice Hortefeux. In 2022, the national holiday celebration took place on the Amazone Square in Cotonou for the first time, and since then, the national commemoration has been held in this square. In 2023, a Nigerian delegation composed of President Bola Tinubu and businessman Aliko Dangote attended. In 2026, the 9th Brigade of the Nigerian Army took part in the parade.

== See also ==
- Public holidays in Benin
- Independence Day (Nigeria)
