= 2002 Lagos armoury explosion =

Accidental bomb detonation

Coordinates: 6°34′25″N 3°21′44″E

The Lagos armoury explosion was the accidental detonation of a large stock of high explosives at a military storage facility in the city of Lagos, Nigeria, on 27 January 2002. The fires created by the debris from this explosion burnt down a large section of Northern Lagos, and created a panic that spread to other areas. As people fled the flames, many stumbled into a concealed canal and drowned. The explosion and its aftermath are believed to have killed at least 1,100 people and displaced more than 20,000, with many thousands injured or homeless. The government of Nigeria launched an enquiry, which blamed the Nigerian Army for failing to properly maintain the base, or to decommission it when instructed to do so in 2001.

== Explosion ==
Ikeja Cantonment was a large Nigerian Army living and storage area in the city of Lagos, situated north of the city centre near the districts of Isolo and Onigbongo. In January 2002, the base was being used to store a large quantity of "high calibre bombs", as well as other sundry explosives. On the afternoon of 27 January, a fire broke out in a street market being held next to the base, which was also home to the families of soldiers. At around 18:00, the fire apparently spread to the base's main munitions store, causing an enormous explosion. This blast killed many of the base staff and their families and immediately destroyed several nearby streets, with flying debris starting numerous fires further afield. Tremors from the explosion also collapsed many buildings in the area, trapping people in the ruins and starting new fires from damaged cooking appliances. These tremors were so powerful that windows shattered 15 km (9.3 mi) away and the blast could be felt more than 50 km (31 mi) inland.

Also thrown up by the blast were thousands of as yet unexploded military munitions, which fell in a rain of exploding shells, grenades and bullets casting further destruction across most of the northern section of the city. Thousands of people from Ikeja and neighbouring districts, seeing explosions and fires breaking out, fled their houses in an attempt to leave the affected areas. As the streets became more and more crowded, explosions amid the fleeing crowds from shells falling from the initial explosion created panic. A stampede developed as panicking people fled in all directions, trampling those who fell underfoot. Reports also describe people jumping from burning high-rise buildings and being killed in desperate attempts to cross the busy Ikeja dual carriageway.

== Effect ==
In central Lagos there is a large canal, which runs from north to south parallel to the Isolo-Oshodi expressway through the centre of the city. It borders a banana plantation, which many refugees thought might be safe from the falling shells and spreading fires. However, the canal separated the plantation from the city and was covered by water hyacinth and thus invisible in the darkness. As the crowd surged towards the plantation, hundreds of panicking people fell into the water. Those on the bottom were crushed by yet more people falling into the waterway, and in the struggling confusion, at least 600 people were killed, many of them children. Many of these bodies drifted down the canal, some being found as far as ten kilometers from the explosion.

The affected areas of the city burned through most of the night, with explosions continuing to boil out of the wrecked armoury until the afternoon of 28 January. The emergency services were woefully inadequate to deal with the devastation, as there were not enough fire crews or water points available to cope with the fire, which consequently consumed large parts of the city's northern suburbs. City hospitals were also utterly overwhelmed, many injured going for hours without any medical attention even if they did manage to reach an undamaged medical facility. The military, too, having suffered the loss of many of its Lagos-based personnel in the initial explosion, was not in a position to assume control of the city and did not appear in large numbers until late on 28 January.

By the evening of 28 January, most of the fires were under control and people began returning to the city and attempting to find loved ones lost in the stampede. Many of the dead were children, separated from their families in the confusion and subsequently crushed in the crowds that filled the streets and canal. On top of the dead from the canal, several hundred people had died in the city itself: killed by falling munitions, trampled by the crowds, or trapped in the fires.

On 29 January, High School students from Bolade Grammar School, Oshodi High School, Oshodi Comprehensive High School and Ikeja Grammar School – which were in close proximity to the Ikeja Cantonment – reported how their classroom ceilings and windows were utterly shattered by the explosion.

== Aftermath ==
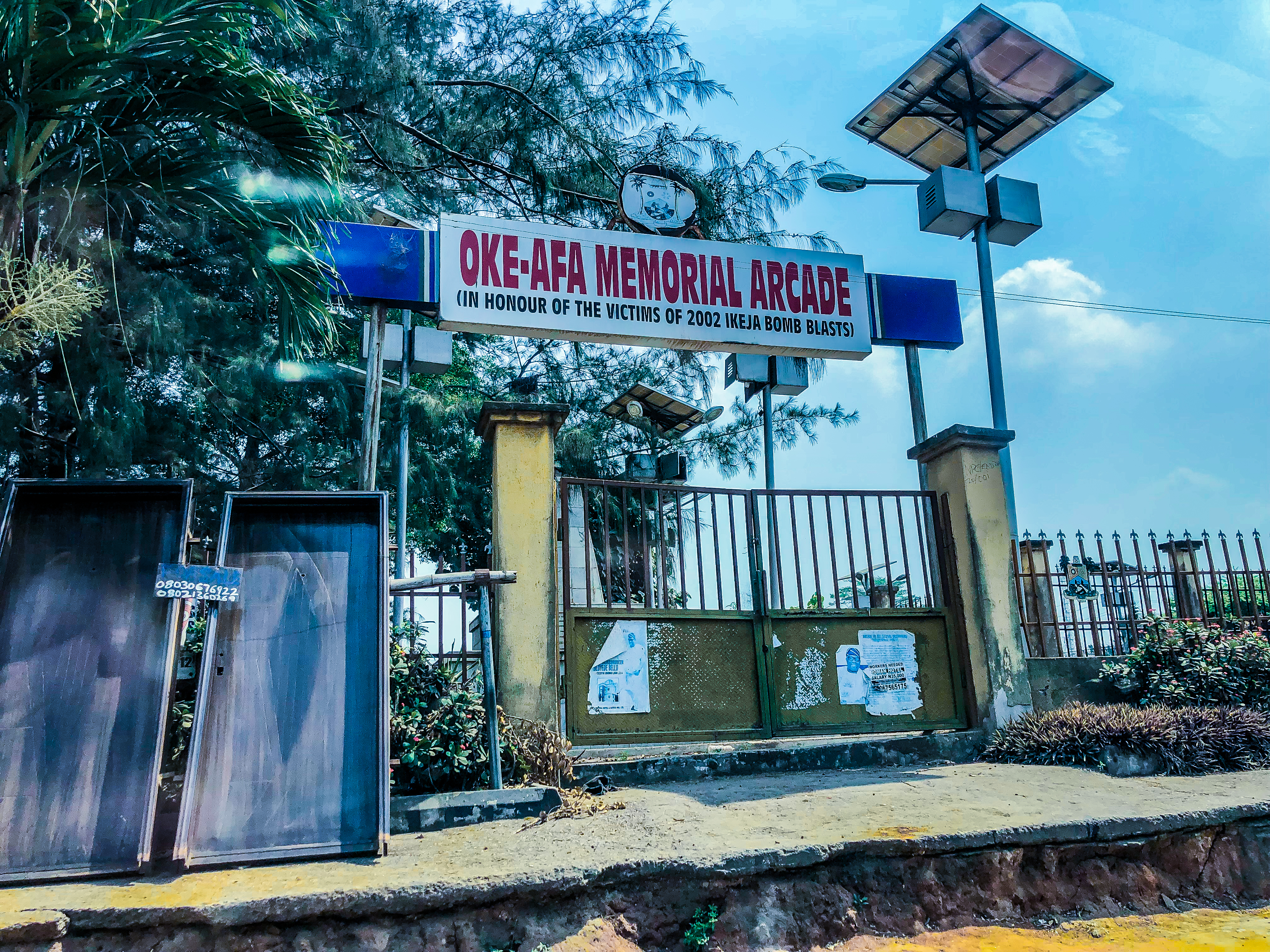
Remembrance Arcade for the 2002 Ikeja Bomb Blast Victims

The final death toll is hard to compute, although the Red Cross claims that at least 1,000 bodies were recovered and a number of people were reported missing and never found. In addition to the dead, at least 5,000 people were injured in the disaster and more than 12,000 left homeless, with entire districts of the city gutted. About 20,000 people had fled the city on the night of the explosion, and the survivors gradually returned over the course of the next week.

The Nigerian president Olusegun Obasanjo arrived in Ikeja on 28 January along with most senior city and national politicians, and he publicly demanded answers from the military as to why such a huge ammunition dump was kept in such a poorly maintained and public location. It later emerged that a small explosion had occurred at the base the previous year, following which the army was advised by city officials to remove or modernise the armoury, but took no action. On the evening of 28 January, George Emdin, the commander of the Ikeja base who had not been present during the explosion, issued a statement:

"On behalf of the military, we are sorry, this is an old ammunition depot with high-calibre bombs ... some efforts were being made in the recent past to try to improve the storage facility, but this accident happened before the high authorities could do what was needed"

This statement provoked fury from the people of Lagos, who claimed that the military was making excuses for their mistakes and that nothing would be done to improve safety at other neglected ammunition dumps, many of which have not been properly maintained since Nigeria gained democracy in 1999 following twenty years of military rule. There were widespread fears in the immediate aftermath of the explosion that it signified the beginning of a military coup, although the government later released a statement ruling out this possibility.

Numerous relief agencies, including the Red Cross and Red Crescent, provided aid to the thousands of homeless and lost people in the weeks following the disaster, attempting to reunite at least 2,000 separated or displaced families. People whose homes had survived were evacuated from Ikeja in order that military explosives experts could remove large quantities of unexploded munitions from the area. The evacuees and refugees were housed in temporary accommodation at the Ikeja Police College and the Abalti Barracks Yaba. The recovery process in Ikeja took some years as the rebuilding program was both lengthy and expensive, with many people suffering homelessness and poverty in this period due to the loss of their houses and livelihoods in the fire.

== See also ==
- List of explosions
