= Guards Brigade =

Guards Brigade may refer to:

- Brigade of Guards, a formation of the British Army
- Brigade of the Guards, an Indian Army regiment
- Soviet Guards brigade, see Guards unit
- Presidential Guard Brigade (Nigeria)
