= Independence Day (Nigeria) =

National holiday in Nigeria

- Flag of Nigeria
- Also called: October First
- Observed by: Nigeria
- Type: National Day
- Significance: The day in 1960 that marks the end of Colonial Nigeria
- Celebrations: Recitation of the National Anthem, Parade by students in their respective Local Governments (LGs)
- Date: October 1
- Frequency: Annual

Independence Day, known colloquially as October 1, is an official national holiday in Nigeria, celebrated on 1 October. It marks Nigeria's proclamation of independence from British rule on 1 October 1960.

== History ==
=== Background about Nigeria ===
In 1914, the Southern Nigeria Protectorate was combined with the Northern Nigeria Protectorate to create the Colony and Protectorate of Nigeria, which has the borders of modern-day Nigeria. By the late 1950s, the call for independence of territories in Africa and the decline of the British Empire led to the country being granted independence on 1 October 1960 as the Federation of Nigeria. Three years later, the constitution was amended and the country was declared the Federal Republic of Nigeria with Nnamdi Azikiwe, previously Governor-General, as the first President.

=== First Independence Day ===
In 1960, Lieutenant David Ejoor, who later became the Chief of Army Staff, had the honor of commanding the guard at the midnight flag raising ceremony.

== Celebrations ==
The holiday is celebrated annually by the government of Nigeria. The festivities begin with the President's address to the people, which is broadcast on radio and television. There are also celebrations across all sectors in Nigeria, including the Nigerian Armed Forces, the Nigeria Police Force, the Ministry of Foreign Affairs, the workforce and national education services. For instance, the primary and secondary schools perform a ceremonial marchpast in various state capitals and local government areas where they are located. The streets are filled with celebrations as individuals and groups troupe to the streets wearing green-white-green. Offices and markets are closed in Nigeria on 1 October.

In recent years public disillusionment has led to muted celebrations, due to the state of the economy and lingering ethnic tensions.

=== National parades ===
An annual civil-military parade is held at Eagle Square, with top members of the Nigerian Presidential Cabinet being in attendance. At the event, the President, in his position as Commander-in-Chief, as well as the Commander of the Presidential Guard Brigade, inspect the guard of honour (mounted by the Nigerian Army, Navy, Air Force, Police Force, and the Security and Civil Defence Corps, among other paramilitary forces) in an inspection car. Music and salutes are provided by the massed bands of the Nigerian Armed Forces, led by the director of the Nigerian Army Band Corps. A 21-gun salute is fired by a detachment from the Army Artillery Regiment as the event is brought to a close.

== Celebrations outside Nigeria ==
In New York, Nigeria's Independence Day has been marked by celebrations in the streets since 1991. The celebrations in the United States are the largest celebrations outside of Nigeria, and usually attract around 75,000 people every year.

== Notable anniversaries ==
- Golden jubilee (2010)
- Diamond jubilee (2020)

== See also ==
- List of national independence days
