= Mohammed Usman (general) =

Nigerian military officer

Major General Mohammed Usman
- Military career
- Allegiance: Nigeria
- Branch: Nigerian Army
- Service years: 1995–present
- Rank: Major general
- Commands: Presidential Guard Brigade; 2 Division; 81 Division

Major General Mohammed Takuti Usman is a Nigerian military officer, who is the Commander of the 81 Division, Nigerian Army.

He was Commander of the Presidential Guard Brigade of Nigeria from 2019 to 2023, appointed by President Muhammadu Buhari on 4 August 2019 to replace the outgoing commander Brigadier General Umar Tama Musa.

Usman had served as the company commander of Guards Brigade and Adjutant Commanding Officer of 177 Battalion, he held the Chief of Staff at the Brigade for three commanders as a colonel for four years.

He was the Chief of Civil Military Affairs at the Army Headquarters in Abuja before becoming the 36th Commander for the Guards Brigade.
