= Armed Forces Remembrance Day =

Public holiday in Nigeria

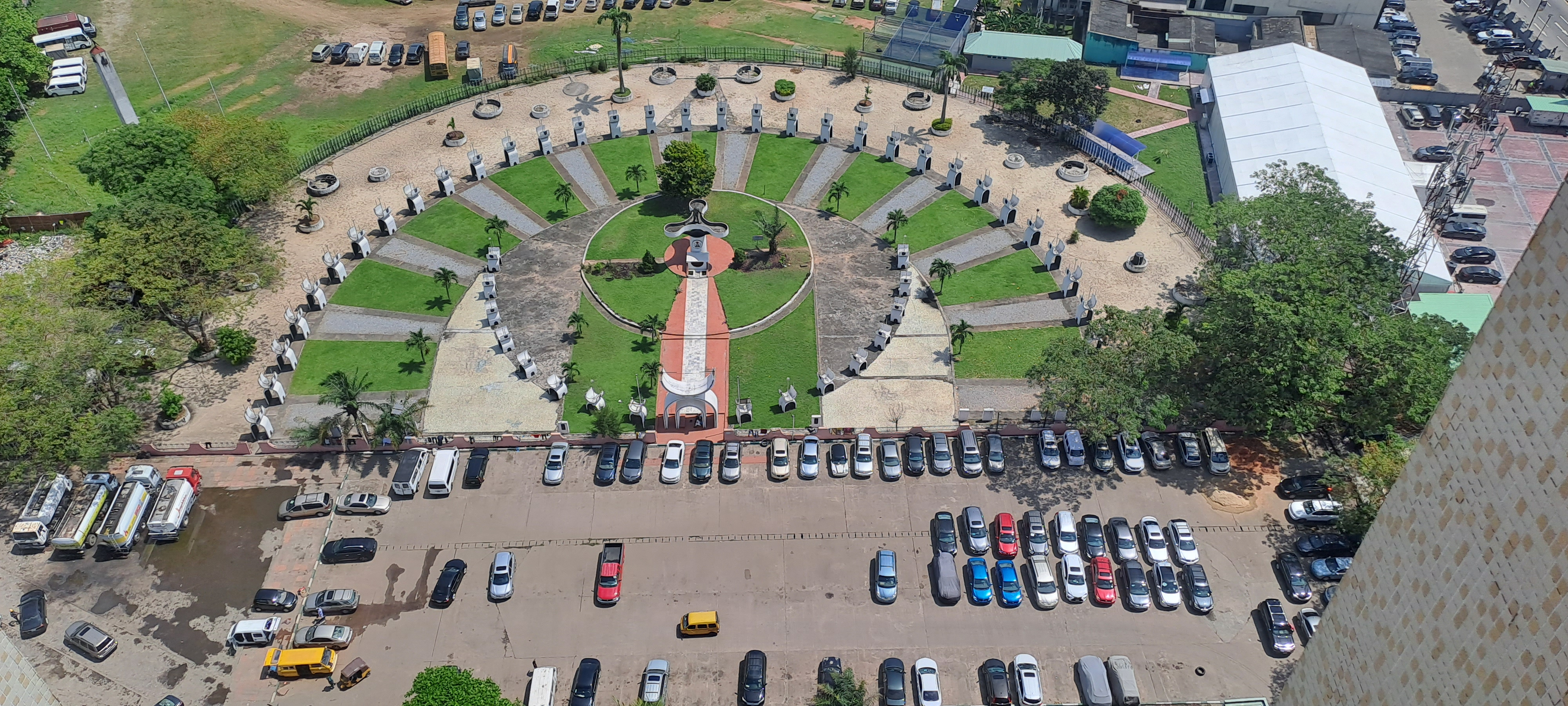
Remembrance Arcade, Lagos is where the wreath to the Unknown Soldier is laid every January 15th.

The Armed Forces Remembrance Day Celebration (AFRDC) is observed on 15 January in Nigeria. It serves to honour veterans of the First and Second World War and Nigerian Civil War (Biafra War) as well as to commemorate the servicemen of the Nigerian Armed Forces. Being a former British colony, Remembrance Day was formerly celebrated on 11 November as Poppy Day in honor of the end of the First World War. Upon the government victory, against Biafran troops on 15 January 1970, "the day, the instrument of surrender was handed over to Olusegun Obasanjo by Philip Effiong of the Biafran army", hence, the holiday was moved off the calendar of the Commonwealth of Nations and was changed to 15 January in commemoration of the conclusion of the Nigerian Civil War that sought to tear apart the unity of Nigeria.

== Common celebrations ==
The Armed Forces Remembrance Day celebration is an annual event organized to honor members of the Nigerian Armed Forces and its veterans. Events are held at the federal, state and local levels. Over two months prior to 15 January, the Ministry of Defence inaugurates a 25-man national planning committee for the AFRDC celebration preparations. Military parades often involve the participation of a guard of honour from the Nigerian Army, Nigerian Navy, and Nigerian Air Force. The peak of all events held is the wreath laying ceremony done by the President of Nigeria at the National Cenotaph in Abuja's Eagle Square. 36 federal cenotaphs are also places where special AFRD ceremonies are held. Special prominence is also given to the Nigerian Legion, a veterans association which organizes many events on this day alongside the government.

== Commemorations by year ==
- In 2017, the Guards Brigade cemetery near Murtala Mohammed Way in Abuja was inaugurated as a place for burying active and retired brigade personnel, as part of an initiative by General Tukur Yusuf Buratai for all army formations to have their own unit cemeteries.
- 2020 marked the golden jubilee of the war's end. The week of that anniversary, Nigerian Vice President Yemi Osibanjo announced plans to allocate funds to support families of fallen soldiers. The Centre for Memories in Enugu (focused mostly on preserving of Igbo history and culture) premiered a documentary on AFRDC titled January 15, 1970: Untold Memories from the Nigeria-Biafra War.

== See also ==
- List of wars involving Nigeria

== Gallery ==
Armed Forces Remembrance Day

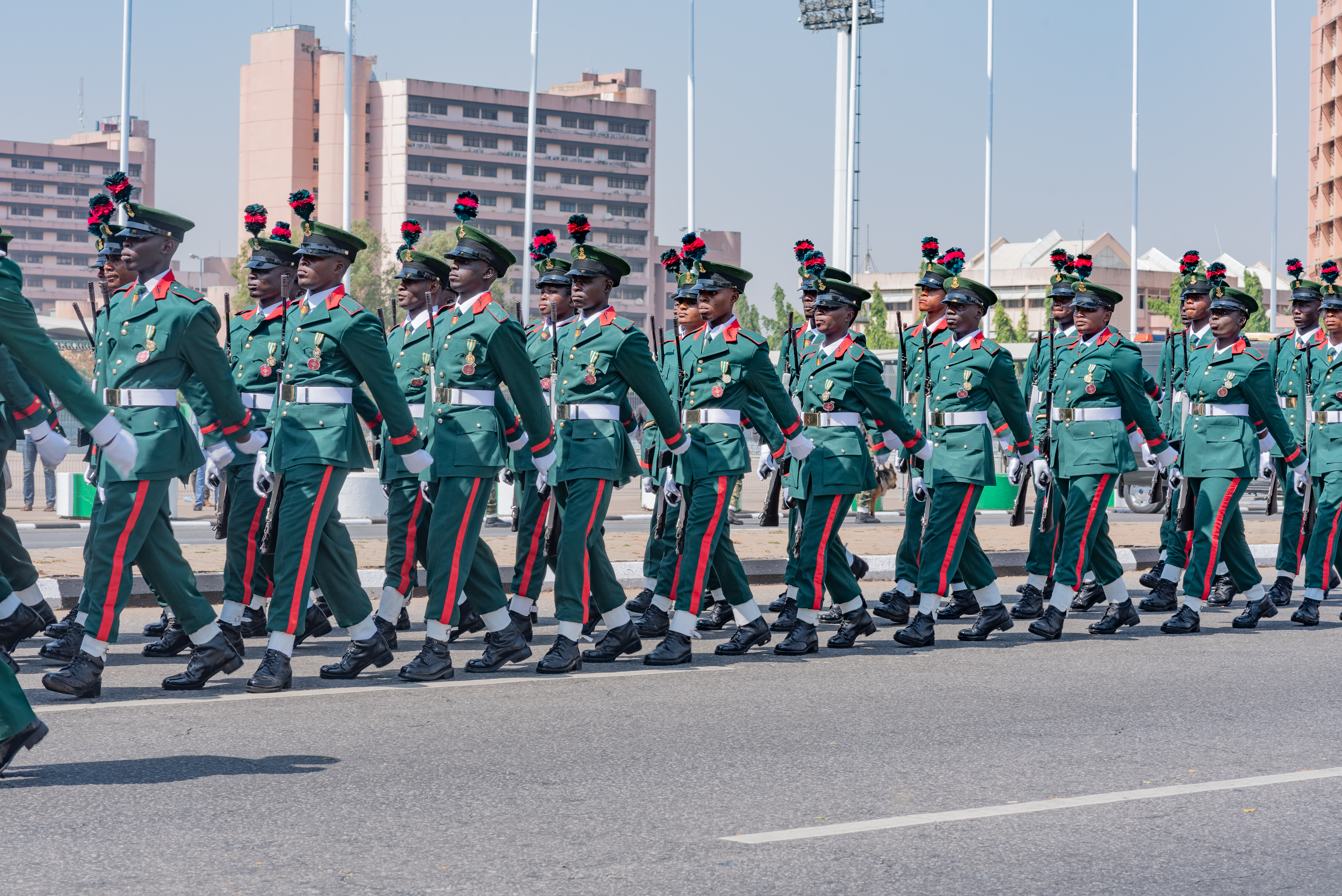
Armed Forces Remembrance Day

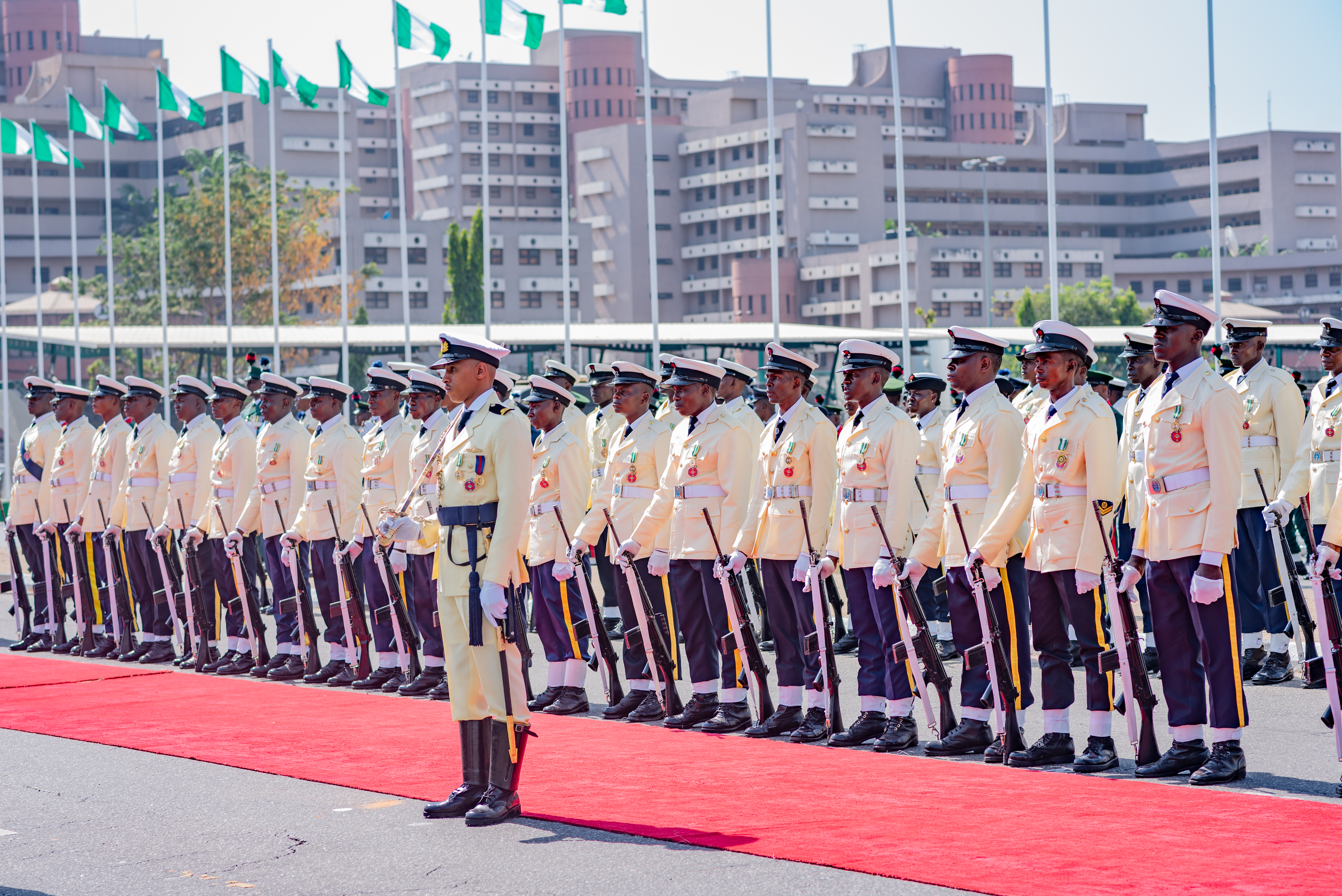
Armed Forces Remembrance Day

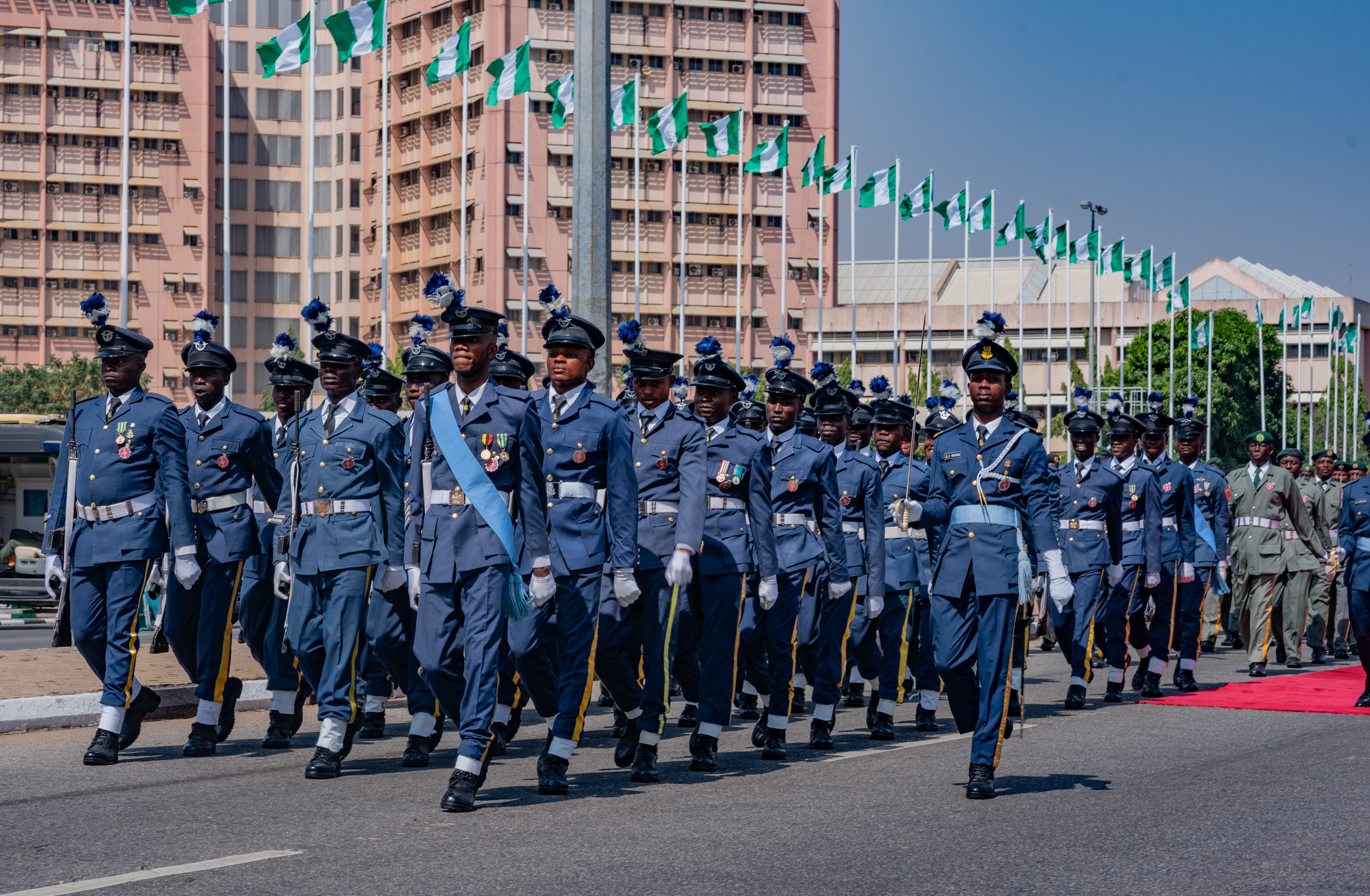
Armed Forces Remembrance Day

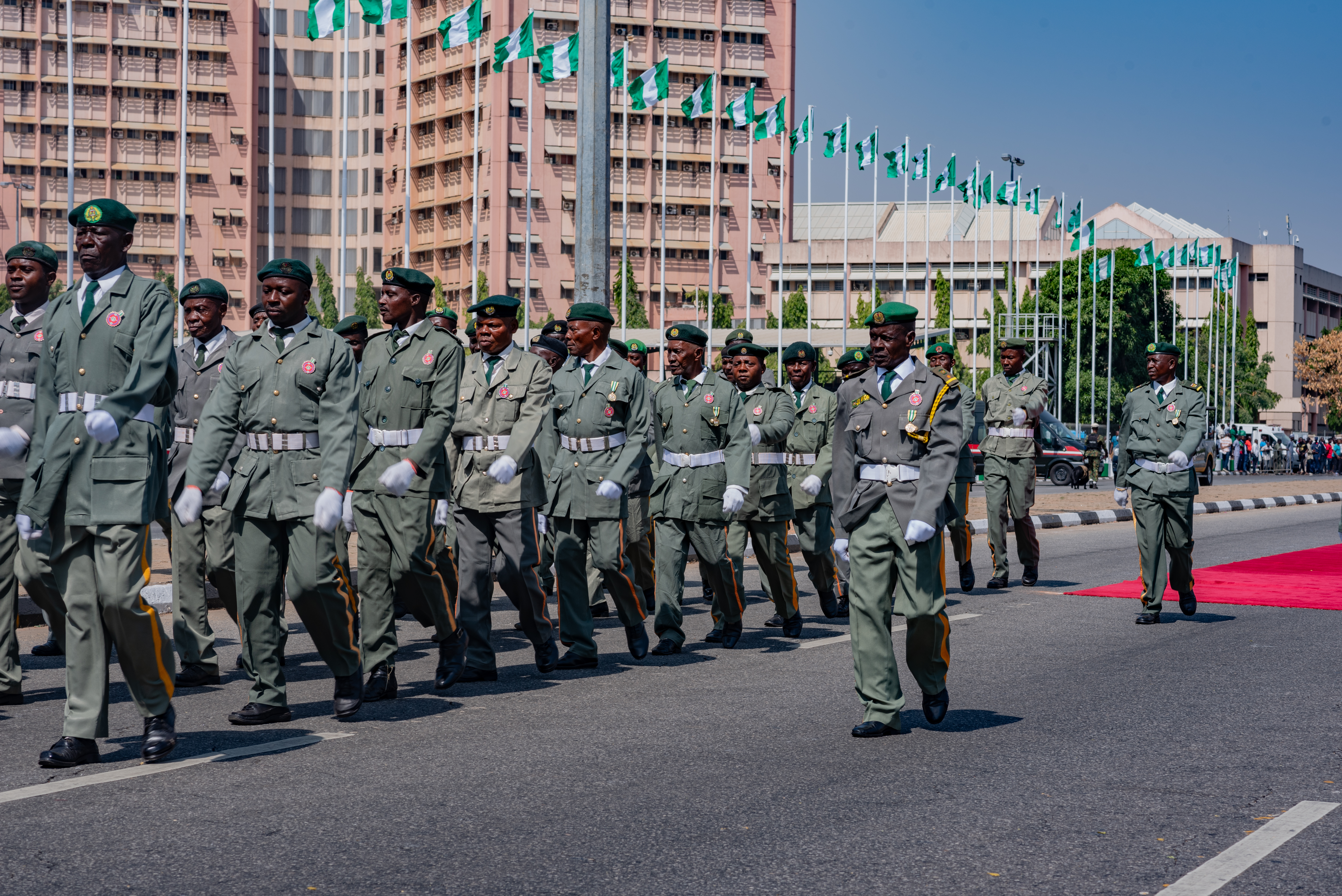
Armed Forces Remembrance Day

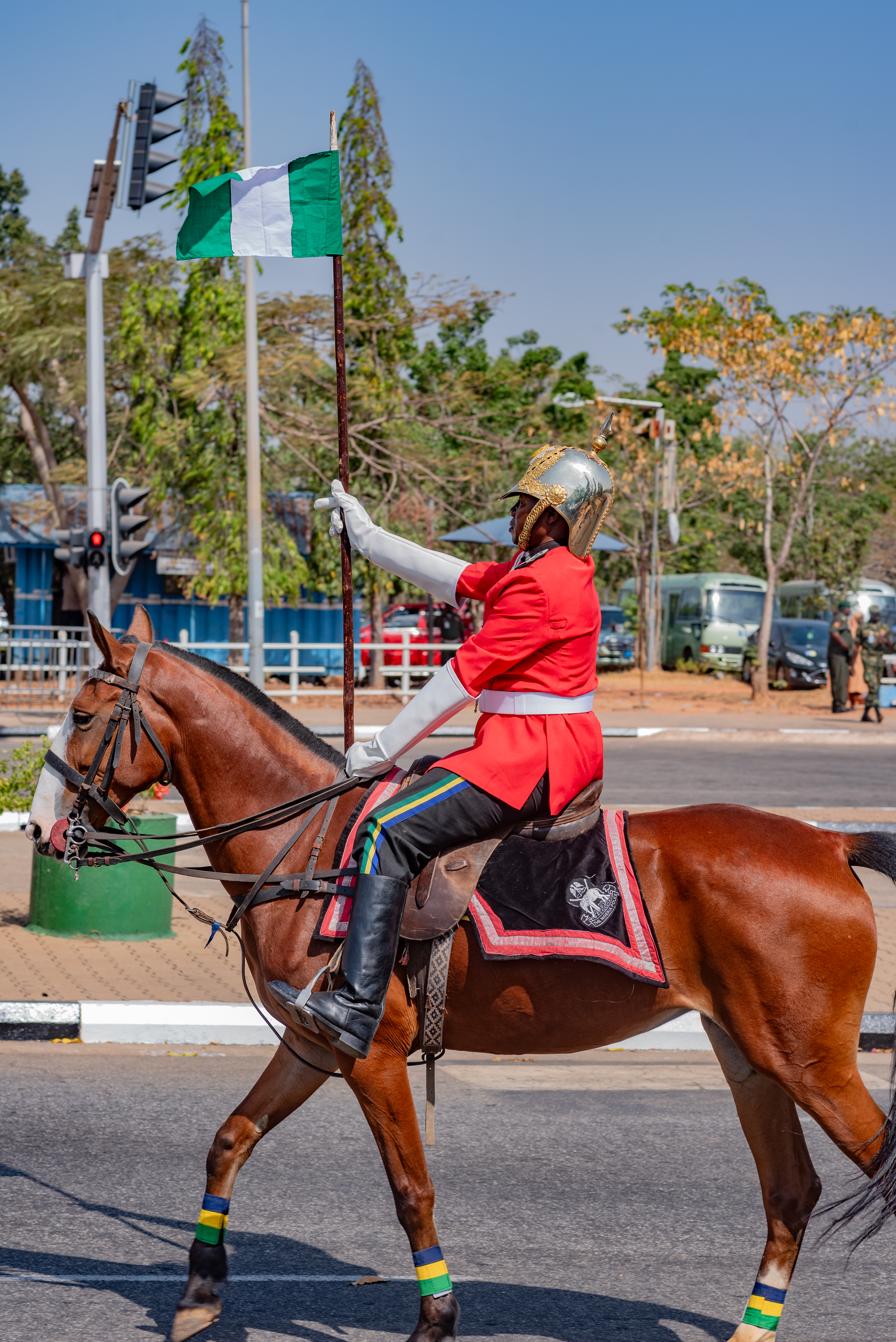
Armed Forces Remembrance Day

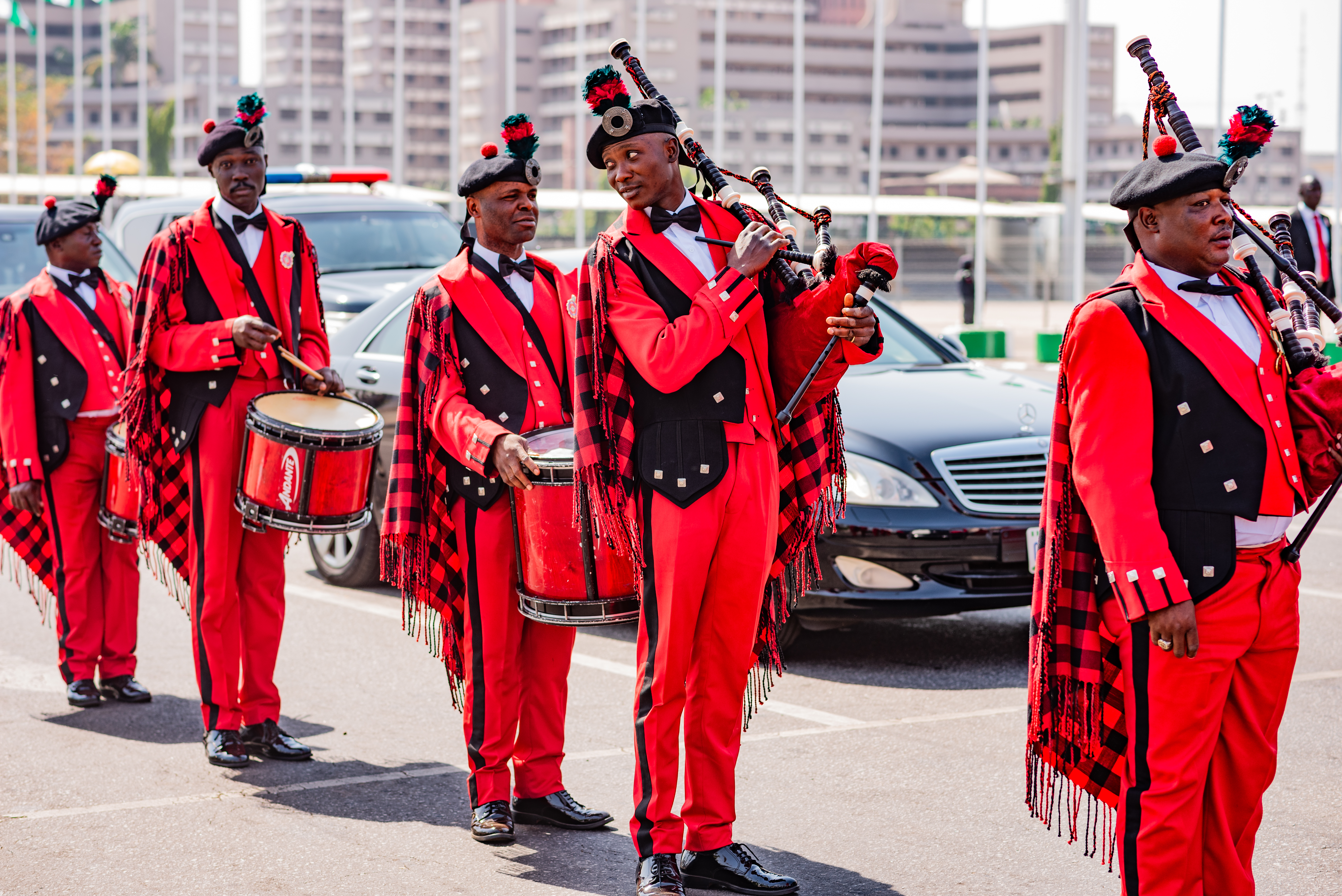
Armed Forces Remembrance Day

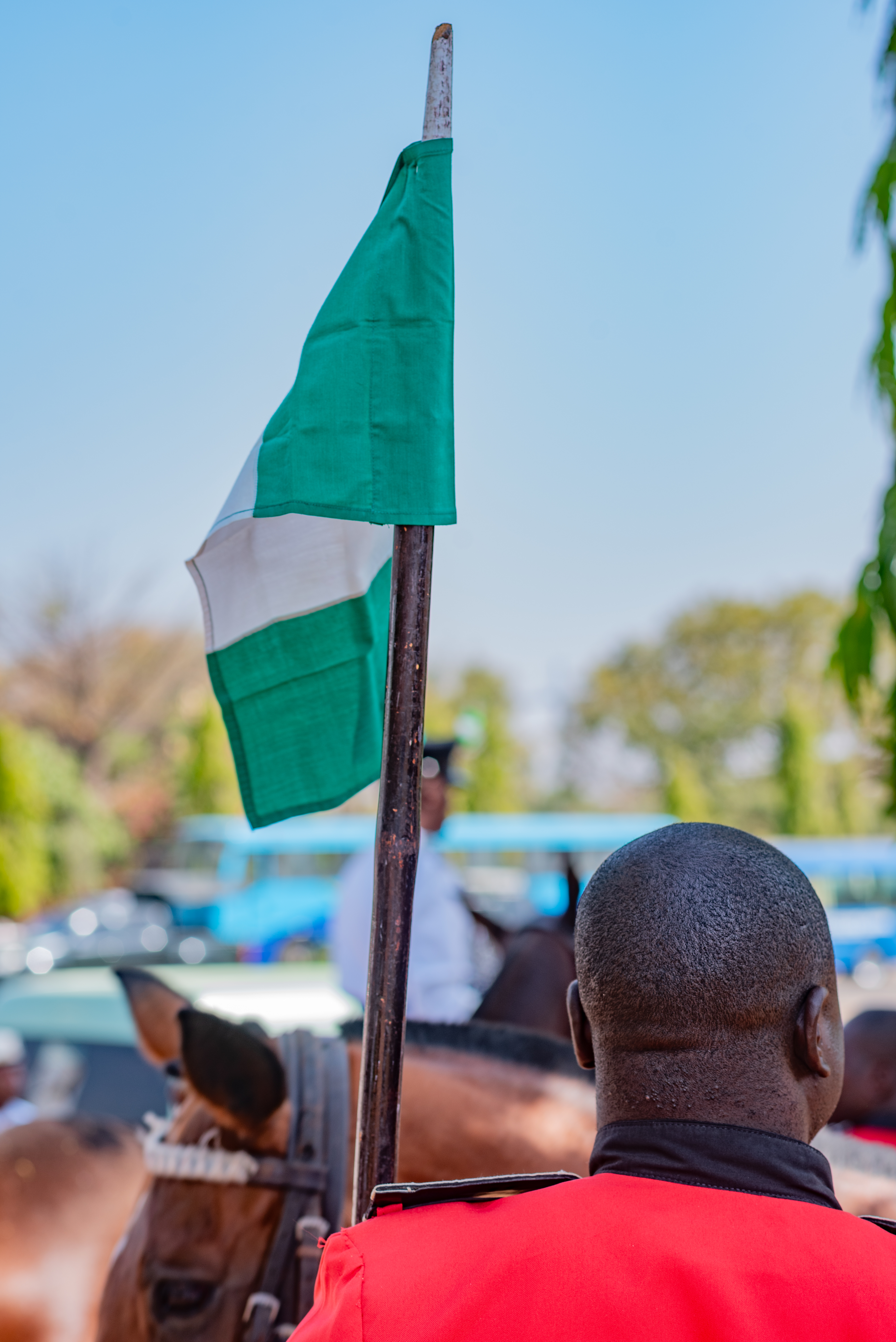
Armed Forces Remembrance Day

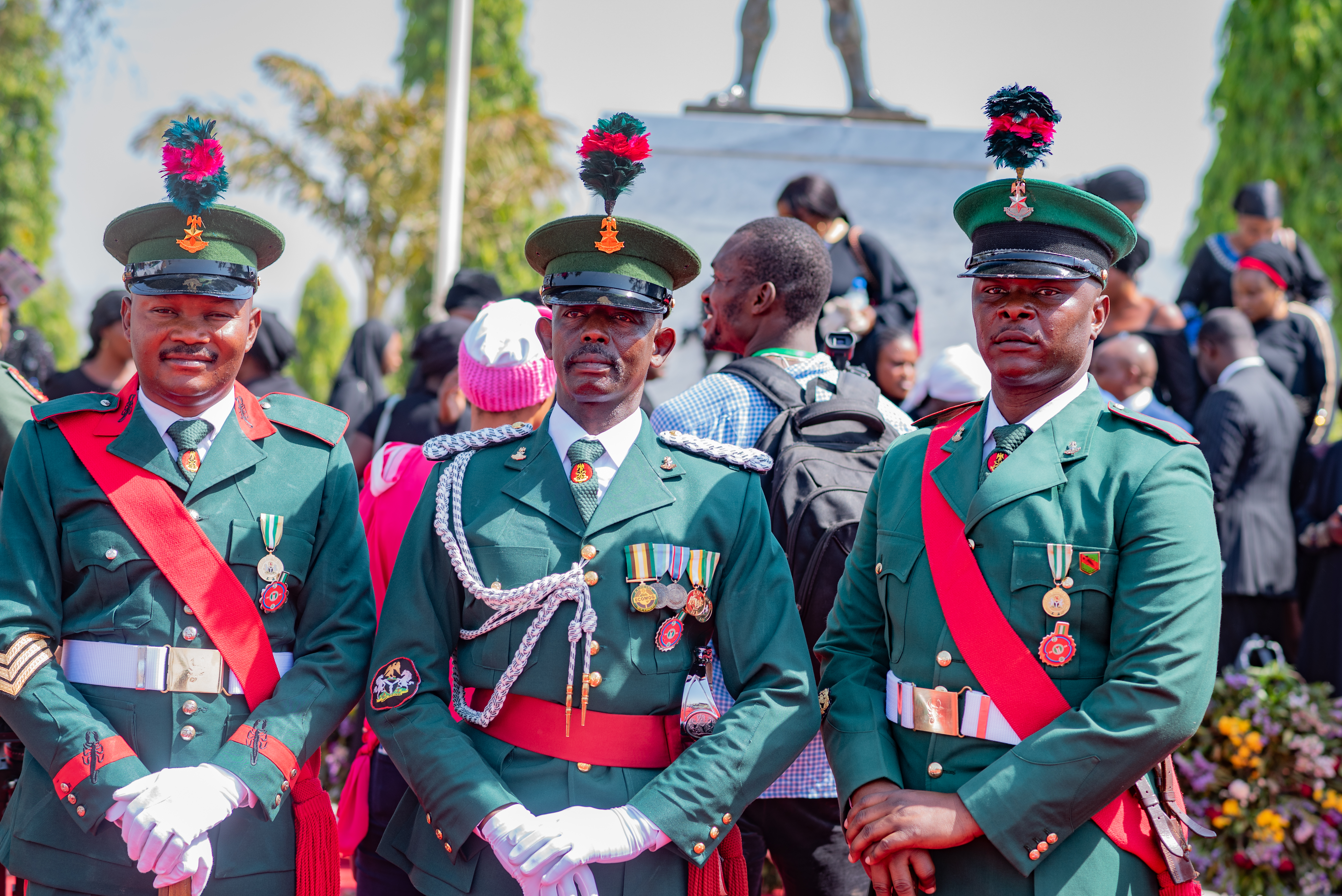
Armed Forces Remembrance Day

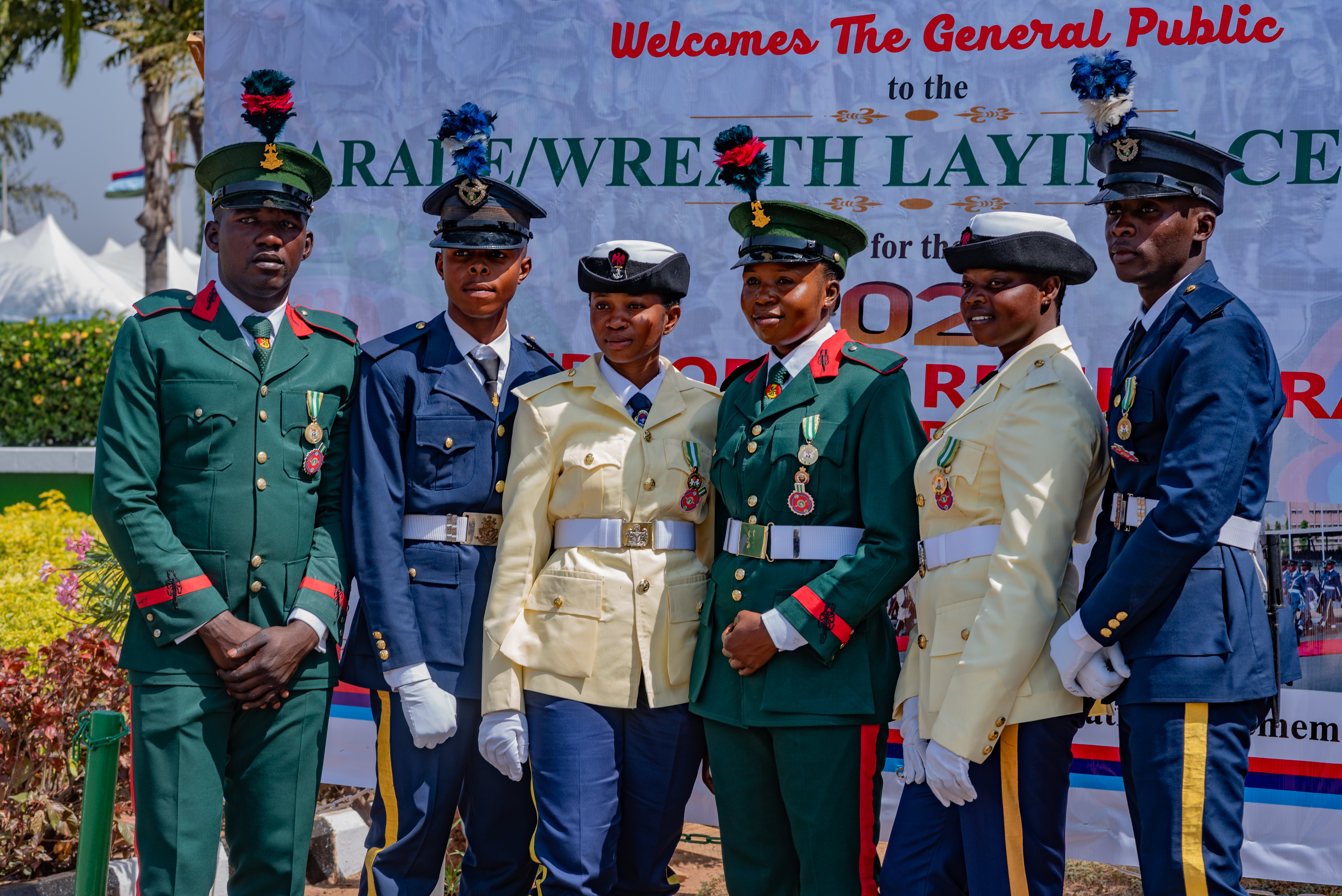
Armed Forces Remembrance Day
