= Bashir Salihi Magashi =

Nigerian politician and general (born 1949)

Major General Bashir Salihi Magashi CFR CON

Minister of Defence
- In office 21 August 2019 – 29 May 2023
- President: Muhammadu Buhari
- Preceded by: Mansur Dan Ali
- Succeeded by: Mohammed Badaru Abubakar

Military Governor of Sokoto State
- In office August 1990 – January 1992
- Preceded by: Ahmed Muhammad Daku
- Succeeded by: Yahaya Abdulkarim

Commandant of the Nigerian Defence Academy
- In office June 1998 – May 1999
- Preceded by: Air Marshal Al-Amin Daggash
- Succeeded by: Maj-Gen P.G. Sha

Personal details
- Born: 1 October 1949 (age 76) Northern Region, British Nigeria (present-day Kano State, Nigeria)
- Education: Nigerian Defence Academy; Ahmadu Bello University (LL.B.)
- Occupation: Politician; military officer; lawyer

Military service
- Allegiance: Nigeria
- Branch/service: Nigerian Army
- Years of service: 1968–1999
- Rank: Major general

Bashir Salihi Magashi CFR CON (born 1 October 1949) is a retired Nigerian Army major general who served as the defence minister of Nigeria from 2019 to 2023. He served as governor of Sokoto State from August 1990 to January 1992 during the military regime of General Ibrahim Babangida, and as commandant of the Nigerian Defence Academy from 1998 to 1999.

== Early life ==
Magashi was admitted to the Nigerian Defence Academy in 1968 and commissioned into the Nigerian Army in 1971 as a member of the 5th Regular Combatant Course. He also attended the Ahmadu Bello University in Zaria, where he obtained an advanced diploma in public administration, LL.B. Honors and a call to the Nigerian Bar with a BL Hons in 1984.

== Military career ==
Magashi started his career as a platoon commander and later became company commander at the historic and elite 6 infantry Battalion (Bn) of the Nigerian Army. He was later deployed as adjutant 1st Guards Battalion Bn and later commander of The 4 Guards battalion in Epe Lagos; He was also commander, 93 Mechanized Bn and commander, 192 Mechanized Bn. He also served as deputy military secretary (DMS 2) 1984-1985 and (DMS 1) 1985–1987 at the Army Headquarters (AHQ MS A), Cadets Brigade commander in Nigerian Defence Academy 1988-1990 and as the commander, 7 Mechanized Infantry Brigade in Sokoto in 1990. He served as the military governor of Sokoto State from August 1990 to January 1992.

Magashi was later appointed commander of the 15 Brigade of the ECOWAS Monitoring Group (ECOMOG) mission in Liberia in 1992 before commanding the Nigerian Contingent Force in 1993. He was a member of the Sani Abacha Military Caucus that reviewed the military and the political situation resulting from the annulment of the 12 June 1993 presidential election. During the intrigues leading to General Sani Abacha's assumption of power in November 1993, Brig. General Bashir S Magashi was given command of the Brigade of Guards in September. He served as commander of the Guards Brigade in Abuja from 1993 to 1996. General Magashi subsequently rose to become general officer commanding of the 2nd Division, Ibadan and later proceeded to the Lagos Garrison Command as commander. Shortly after democracy was restored in May 1999, the government announced the compulsory retirement of all armed forces officers who had served for six or more months in military governments, including Major-General Bashir Magashi. He finally retired from the Nigerian Army as commandant, Nigerian Defence Academy Kaduna from 1998 to 1999 as his last official engagement as a Military officer.

He was a member of the Provisional Ruling Council from 1996 to 1999, a member of the Association of Humanitarian Lawyers and equally an honorable member of the Nigerian Red Cross Society.

He has attended various leadership and management courses both home and abroad. He is a graduate of the International Institute of Humanitarian Law in Italy and a Member of the Senior Executives Course 14 of the National Institute of Policy and Strategic Studies Kuru in Jos.

== Political career ==
In the political sphere, he was in 2002 the legal adviser to the All Nigeria People's Party (ANPP) and in 2007, the Kano State governorship candidate of the Democratic People's Party (DPP). He later became the national chairman of the party before finally retiring from politics in 2014.

In August 2019, he was appointed minister of defence of Nigeria by President Muhammadu Buhari, and served till 29 May 2023.

== Allegations ==
An investigation by Nigerian-based Newspaper – Premium Times, reported that Magashi as army officer was engaged in illegal oil crude oil allocation and funds from trade to the tune of $550,000 at Jersey UK, branch of Bank PNP Paribus.

== Honours, awards, and personal life ==
He is married with children and enjoys reading, football and athletics. He also occasionally plays golf.

He is a recipient of the Forces Service Star (FSS), Meritorious Service Star (MSS) and The Distinguished Service Star (DSS). His decorations also include the ECOMOG MEDAL and Silver Jubilee Medal. He has also received distinguished National awards and titles including Commander Order of the Niger (CON) and the prestigious Commander of the Federal Republic (CFR).

== See also ==
- Cabinet of Nigeria

== Award ==
In October 2022, a Nigerian national honour of Commander of the Order of the Federal Republic (CFR) was conferred on him by President Muhammadu Buhari.
