= Public holidays in Benin =

This is a list of holidays in Benin.

== Public holidays ==
Date	English name
January 1	New Year's Day
Second Friday in January	Vaudoun Day
May 1	Labour Day
Monday after Easter	Easter Monday
40 days after Easter	Ascension Day
Monday after Pentecost	Whit Monday
August 1	Independence Day
August 15	Assumption Day
November 1	All Saints' Day
December 25	Christmas Day

== Movable holidays ==
The following holidays are public holidays but the date on which each occurs varies, according to its corresponding calendar, and thus has no set date. In order in which they occur:

English name	Local name	Date	Description
Eid al-Adha	Tabaski	10 Dhu al-Hijjah	Feast of Sacrifice
Prophet's Birthday	Maouloud	12 Rabi' al-awwal	Celebrates Muhammad's Birthday
Eid al-Fitr	Korité	1 Shawwal	Celebrates end of Ramadan
