= Command Secondary Schools =

- Nigeria

Information
- School type: Federal Secondary School
- Motto: Strength through Knowledge (formerly 'Discipline and Knowledge')
- Founded: 1977
- School board: Nigerian Army Education Corps
- Grades: JSS1 - SSS3
- Language: English
- Area: Nigeria
- Colours: Lawn green and Forest green
- Team name: Commandos
- Website: www.dcss.sch.ng

Command Secondary Schools are secondary schools under the Nigerian Army Education corps (previously under the defunct Institute of Army Education).

== Overview ==
The Directorate of Command Schools is directly responsible for administration. Command Schools may be regular day schools (known as Command Day Secondary School (CDSS)) or boarding schools (known as Command Secondary School (CSS)). Command schools were established as welfare schools to provide low cost, quality education to children of Nigerian army personnel while indoctrinating patriotism, civic responsibility and military discipline in attendees. Over time, admission requirements have been relaxed to allow the entry of students who are not wards or children of soldiers. However, civilian fees are much higher than fees for children of military and police personnel.

Command Schools maintain an affiliation with the Nigerian Military School (NMS), Nigerian Navy Secondary Schools and Nigerian Air Force Secondary Schools. Both Command schools and NMS are run by the Nigeria Army, however they have distinct aims. While NMS aims to produce military personnel, Command schools aim to produce a wider base of graduates including civilians who have strong national values. Howbeit, a significant portion of Command School graduates go on to join different branches of Nigerian Military. Command Schools are known for their quality of education and prominent alumni in the country. Command alumni informally known as ex-commandos often contribute to development projects in their alma mater.

== List of Command Schools ==
Boarding Schools
Name of School	State
Command Secondary School, Kaduna	Kaduna State
Command Secondary School, Ibadan	Oyo State
Command Science Secondary School (Boys), Faskari	Katsina State
Command Science Secondary School (Girls), Barkiya	Katsina State
Command Secondary School, Jos	Plateau State
Command Secondary School, Mbiri	Delta State
Command Science Secondary School, Portharcourt	Rivers State
Command Science Secondary School, Effa-Etinan	Akwa-Ibom State
Command Science Secondary School, Yenegoa	Bayelsa State
Command Science Secondary School, Numan	Adamawa State
Command Science Secondary School (Boys), Auno	Borno State
Command Science Secondary School (Girls), Miringa	Borno State
Command Secondary School (Boys), Jega	Kebbi State
Command Science Secondary School (Girls), Goru	Kebbi State
Command Science Secondary School (Boys), Shagari	Sokoto State
Command Secondary School (Girls), Sokoto	Sokoto State
Command Science Secondary School (Boys), Talata Mafara	Zamfara State
Command Science Secondary School (Girls), Gusau	Zamfara State
Command Secondary School, Ipaja	Lagos State
Command Secondary School, Abakaliki	Ebonyi State
Command Secondary School, Makurdi	Benue State
Command Secondary School, Ohafia	Abia State
Command Secondary School, Orlu	Imo State
Command Science Secondary School, Lafia	Nassarawa State
Command Science Secondary School, Agwada	Nassarawa State
Command Science Technical Secondary School, Rinze-Akwanga	Nassarawa State

Day Schools
Name of School	State
Command Day Secondary School, Ojo	Lagos State
Command Day Secondary School, Enugu	Enugu State
Command Day Secondary School, Kaduna	Kaduna State
Command Day Secondary School, Ibadan	Oyo State
Command Day Secondary School, Mokola	Oyo State
Command Day Secondary School, Ede	Osun State
Command Day Secondary School, Ijebu-Ode	Ogun State
Command Day Secondary School Owena Barracks, Akure	Ogun State
Command Day Secondary School, Jos	Plateau State
Command Day Secondary School, Ikeja	Lagos State
Command Day Secondary School, Oshodi	Lagos State
Command Day Secondary School, Makurdi	Benue State
Command Day Secondary School, Abuja	FCT

== Extra curricular activities ==
Command Schools believe strongly in the development of students who are 'academically and physically fit'. Schools are usually sited on land that leaves plenty of green space for outdoor activities. Students are required to participate in some extracurricular activities and are strongly encouraged to participate in others.

=== Inter-house sports ===
Students are divided into houses which are named after Nigerian Army divisions and the house shares its flag with the corresponding division. In boarding schools, the house is usually the same as the name of residences. For instance students in Tiger house would live in Tiger Hall/Hostel/Dormitory.

Houses in Command Schools
House	Division	Division HQ
Tiger	2nd Div	Ibadan
Hippo (Formerly Palm)	81 Div (Formerly Lagos Garrison)	Lagos
Stallion (Formerly Flying Horse)	1st Div	Kaduna
Rhinoceros (Formerly Octopus)	3rd Div	Jos
Dragon	82 Div	Enugu

Inter-house sports cover a variety of track and field and ball sports including short and middle-distance races, high jump, long jump, triple jump, pole vault, javelin, discus, shot put, weightlifting basketball, football, volleyball, handball, tennis, table tennis, calisthenics, karate, wrestling, Floor gymnastics taekwondo, parade drill, draughts, and Ayo. Inter-house sports are usually festive events and students may play several other unofficial games including games of tag, pond-surfing, and temporary shelter building.

=== Educational technology adoption ===
On 9-April-2022, Nigeria army partnered and adopted an education technology solution "SchoolTry" to discontinue the use of paper to gather information across all the command schools in Nigeria. The solution also serves as a learning management tool for students of the to learn both from home and in class, for parents to monitor their children's academic performance and progress and lastly for teachers to be able to facilitate the process of teaching and information dissemination.

=== Inter-school games ===
Command Schools usually match off against each other in a set of competitions called the Inter-Command games. The games typically have the same type of events as the inter-house sports. Sometimes the NMS may enter a team for the games. Command School schools also participate in sporting events in their local government, state or region.

=== Clubs, societies and martial organizations ===
Students are typically required to be registered members of at least one club or society. Clubs and societies carry out activities in a given area of interest. Sometimes clubs and societies may be affiliated with larger national or international bodies. Common clubs and societies include Red Cross, Junior Engineers, Technicians and Scientists Club, Literary and Debating Society, Young farmers club, Karate club, Taekwondo Dojo, and basketball club.

=== Other competitions ===
Command schools frequently participate in spelling bees, STEM competitions and exhibitions, debates, arts exhibitions, Nigerian Military School Sport, INTER-Command Sports & essay writing competitions amongst others.

=== Cadet Corps ===
The cadet corps is a youth paramilitary organization which has the stated goal of promoting leadership development and community engagement among Nigeria youths. Command students are encouraged to join the cadet corps. Cadet members are trained in parade drill and survival skills.
