= 81st Division (Nigeria) =

Nigerian army division

81 Division
- Active: 26 May 2002 – present
- Country: Nigeria
- Type: Mechanized infantry
- Size: Division
- Part of: Nigerian Army
- Garrison/HQ: Eti-Osa, Lagos, Nigeria

Commanders
- General Officer Commanding: Major General Mohammed Usman

The 81st (Amphibious) Division is one of two combined infantry divisions of the Nigerian Army (NA), which specialized in amphibious warfare, combined arms, coastal defence, desert and jungle warfare, maneuver warfare, providing security at ports or shore stations, and reconnaissance. This unit actives since 2002. It has an area of responsibility covering Lagos and Ogun States of Nigeria.

== History ==
It is numbered in honor of the 81st (West Africa) Division. The Division which replaced the Lagos Garrison Command (LGC) came into being in 2000. The youngest Division in the Nigerian Army, it was formed on 26 May 2002.

== Structure ==
The division previously included:

- 81st Division Garrison (Lagos)
  - 9th Brigade (Ikeja)
    - 165th Mechanised Battalion
    - 19th Mechanised Battalion
    - 149th Infantry Battalion
  - 242nd Recce Battalion
  - 35 Artillery Brigade (Alamala Barracks)
  - 81st Division Signals & Logistics Formation's
    - 81st Division Signals Regiment
    - 81st Supply and Transport Brigade
    - 81st Division Ordnance Services
    - 81st Division Electrical and Mechanical Engineers (DEME)
    - 81st Division Military Hospital

== Commanders ==
- Major General Enobong Udoh (5 February 2018 – 7 August 2018)
- Major General Musa Sani Yusuf (7 August 2018 – 23 July 2019)
- Major General Johnson Olubunmi Irefin (23 July 2019 – 22 July 2020)
- Major General Godwin Umelo (22 July 2020 – 13 March 2021)
- Major General Lawrence Fejokwu (13 March 2021 – 15 February 2022)
- Major General Umar Thama Musa (15 February 2022 – 29 July 2022)
- Major General Obinna Ajunwa (29 July 2022 – 27 July 2023)
- Major General Mohammed Takuti Usman (27 July 2023 – 24 July 2024)
- Major General Farouk Umar Mijinyawa (24 July 2024 - present)
