= 8th Division (Nigeria) =

- Active: 13 January 2016–present
- Country: Nigeria
- Type: Mechanized infantry
- Size: Division
- Part of: Nigerian Army
- Garrison/HQ: Sokoto, Nigeria

Commanders
- General Officer Commanding: Major General Bemgba Paul Koughna

The 8th Division is an infantry division unit of the Nigerian Army (NA). It covers the northern part of Borno State.

== History ==
The Nigerian Army Council has approved the establishment of its 8th Division on the orders of Chief of Army Staff, Lieutenant General Yusuf Buratai on 13 January 2016. According to Buratai, the establishment of the division was part of a strategic plan by the Army to boost military operations against Boko Haram in areas around the Lake Chad Basin. On 1 November 2016, the troops of the division commenced an Operation Hardknock to clear pockets Boko Haram terrorist hiding in remote areas of northern Borno State.

== Divisional components ==
- Division Headquarters (Sokoto)
  - Garrison Commander: Lieutenant Colonel K. R. Elero
  - Commander, Medical Services and Hospital: Brigadier General David Chidozie Ibeh
  - Deputy Chief of Staff (Administration): Brigadier General Mansur Tijani
  - Deputy Chief of Staff (Operations): Brigadier General Husaini Toro
  - Commander, 58 Signals Brigade: Brigadier General Abdulmalik Aboki
- 1st Brigade
- 17th Brigade
- 48th Engineer Brigade
- 248th Recce Battalion

== GOCs ==
- Brigadier General S.O. Olabanji (Acting GOC, 2017)
- Major General Hakeem O. Otiki (March 16, 2019)
- Major General Aminu Chinade
- Major General Usman Yusuf (June 17, 2021)
- Major General Jide Ogunlade
- Major General Lawrence Fejokwu (assumed March 2021)
- Major General Uwem Bassey (August 2021 – January 2023
- Major General Godwin Mutkut (January 18, 2023 - July 26, 2024)
- Major General Ibikunle Ademola Ajose (July 26, 2024 – January 2026)
- Major General Bemgba Paul Koughna (January 2026 – Present)
