= 6th Amphibious Division =

Nigerian Army formation

The 6th Amphibious Division is a one of two combined infantry division unit of the Nigerian Army (NA) which specialized in amphibious warfare, combined arms, coastal defence, desert and jungle warfare, providing security at ports or shore stations, and reconnaissance. Its headquarters is at Port Harcourt. It serves to organize and improve its internal security operations in four states of the Niger Delta, to include its home Rivers State, that make up the South South geographic region. It operational with effect from the 7 November 2016. The first General Officer Commanding the division was Major-General K. I. Abdulkarim.

== Commanders ==
- Major General Kasimu Ibrahim Abdulkarim (2016 – 2018)
- Major General Jamil Sarham (2018 – 2019)
- Major General Felix Agugo (2019 – 2020)
- Major General Johnson Irefin (2020 – 2021)
- Major General Musa Yusuf (2022 – 2023)
- Major General Jamal Abdussalam (2023 – 2025)
- Major General Emmanuel Eric Emekah (2025 – 2026)
- Major General Everest Ifeanyi Okoro (2026 – Present)

== Divisional components ==
- 6th Division Headquarters(Port Harcourt)
  - 2nd Brigade (Akwa Ibom)
    - 221st Light Tank Battalion
    - 6th Battalion
  - 16th Brigade (Bayelsa)
    - 130th Battalion
    - 343rd Artillery Regiment
  - 63rd Brigade (Delta)
    - 3rd Battalion
    - 19th Battalion
    - 181st Amphibious Battalion
  - 46th Engineer Brigade
  - Recce Battalion
  - 6th Division Signals & Logistics Formations
    - 56 Signal Regiment
    - 75 Supply and Transport Brigade
    - 6 Division Ordnance Services
    - 6 Division Electrical and Mechanical Engineers (DEME)
    - 6 Division Military Hospital
