= Ikeja Cantonment =

Ikeja Cantonment is a large Nigerian Armed Forces installation in the northern part of Lagos. It is situated north of the city centre near the districts of Isolo and Onigbongo.

During the 1966 Nigerian counter-coup of July 28-29, 1966, Lt. Col. M. O. Nzefili said there was a reported massacre at the camp.

It became the home of 9 Brigade of the 81 Division of the Nigerian Army.

In January 2001, the camp was being used to store a large quantity of "high calibre bombs", as well as other sundry explosives. On the afternoon of 27 January 2002, a fire broke out in a street market being held next to the base, which was also home to the families of soldiers. At around 18:00 the fire apparently spread to the base's main munitions store, causing a bomb explosion. The explosion caused a series of blasts that continued throughout the night and into the next day. The tremors were felt over 50 km away, and windows shattered as far as 15 km away. Debris and unexploded ordnance rained down over a wide area, starting numerous fires. While initial reports varied, official pronouncements and Red Cross figures suggest at least 700 to over 1,100 people died. The vast majority of deaths were not directly from the explosions but from the ensuing panic and stampedes. The Ikeja Cantonment bomb explosion remains one of Nigeria's worst accidental disasters, highlighting issues with military infrastructure maintenance and urban planning in densely populated areas.
