= Amazon Monument (Benin) =

Statute in Benin

Amazon Monument Monument Amazone
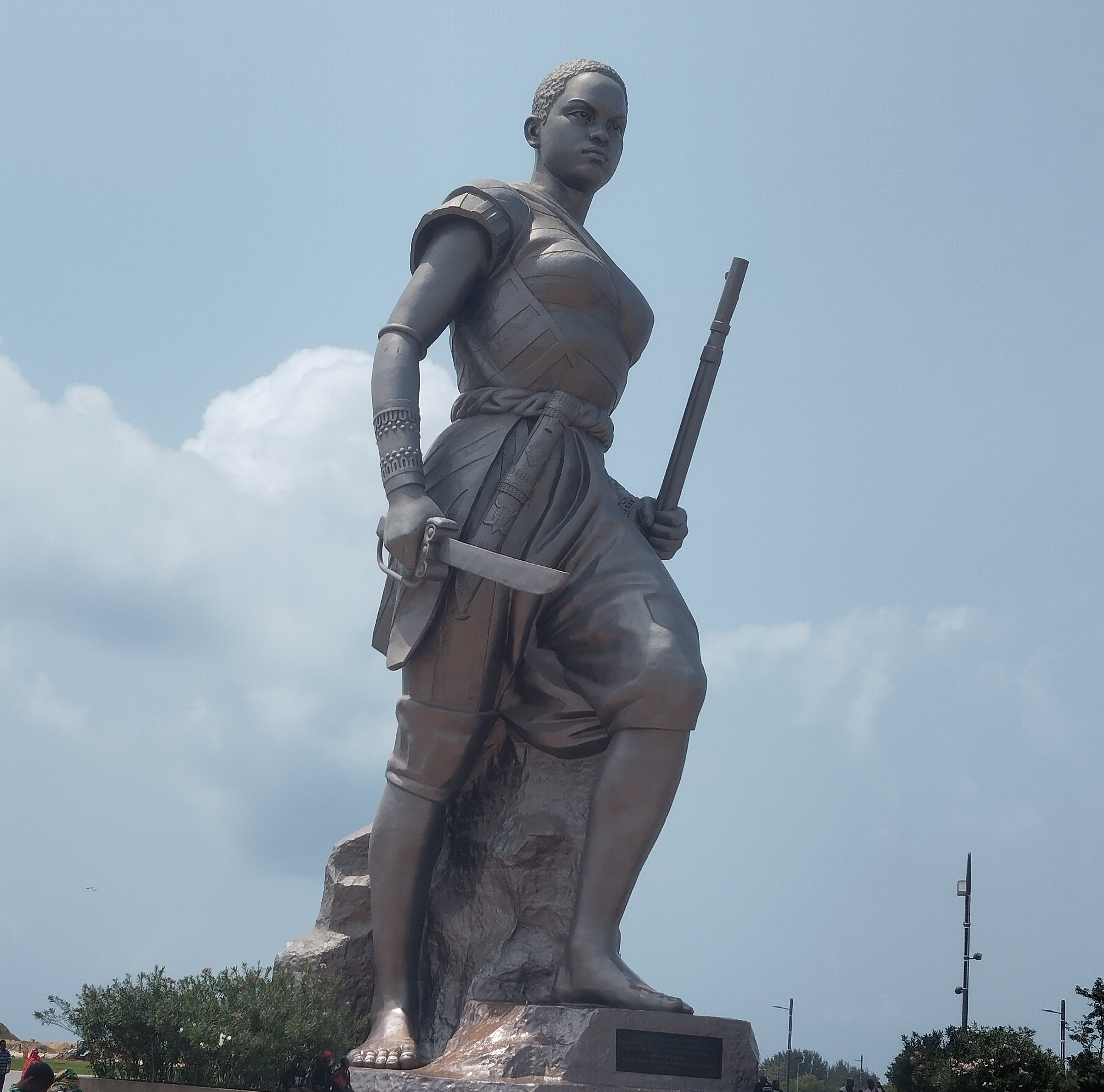
- Amazon Monument
- Interactive map of Amazon Monument; Monument Amazone
- Location: Cotonou, Benin
- Coordinates: 6°20′56″N 2°24′27″E
- Designer: Li Xiangqun
- Type: Statue
- Material: Bronze
- Height: 30 m (98 ft)
- Opening date: 30 July 2022; 3 years ago

The Amazon Monument is a statue honoring the Dahomey Amazons. A metal structure covered in bronze, it is 30m high and weighs 150 tons. It stands on the Esplanade des Amazones in the 12th district of the city of Cotonou in southern Benin. It is the second tallest statue in Africa.

The Amazon Monument was unveiled on July 30, 2022, by the President of the Republic of Benin, Patrice Talon. It depicts a young female warrior armed with a rifle and a sword in a defiant, battle-ready pose.

== Location ==
The Amazon Monument is located between Boulevard de la Marina and the Atlantic Ocean, in the 12th arrondissement of Cotonou, Littoral Department in southern Benin, opposite Independence Square and the Presidential Palace.

== Architecture ==
The work is a bronze-covered metal structure. Designed by Li Xiangqun, it stands 30 meters high.

== Construction ==
The decision to erect the statue of the Amazon on the Amazon Esplanade, a square to be developed for this purpose, was made following the Council of Ministers' meeting on July 17, 2019. The work was entrusted to Chinese artist-sculptor Li Xiangqun, under the auspices of the Beijing Huashi Xiangqun Culture and Art Co. Ltd.

== Symbolism ==
The project was initiated with the aim of giving a new visual identity to the Republic of Benin. It is also an opportunity to pay tribute to the Dahomey Amazons.

The Amazon Monument commemorates an all-female military regiment that existed until the end of the 19th century in the Kingdom of Dahomey. It was a corps created during the reign of Hangbe (from 1708 to 1711) and called "Agoodjié" or "minons," then restructured by King Ghezo.

== Controversies ==
Work at the end of the week of May 8, 2022, revealed the face, right up to the bust, of the Amazon Monument, which had previously been hidden from view. Following this unveiling, a controversy arose on social media with the spread of a rumor that it was the statue of Hangbe. On May 14, 2022, the government of Benin issued a press release denying this rumor, recalling the context of the monument's erection.
