= Presidential Guards Brigade (Nigeria) =

Army brigade responsible for protecting the Nigerian president

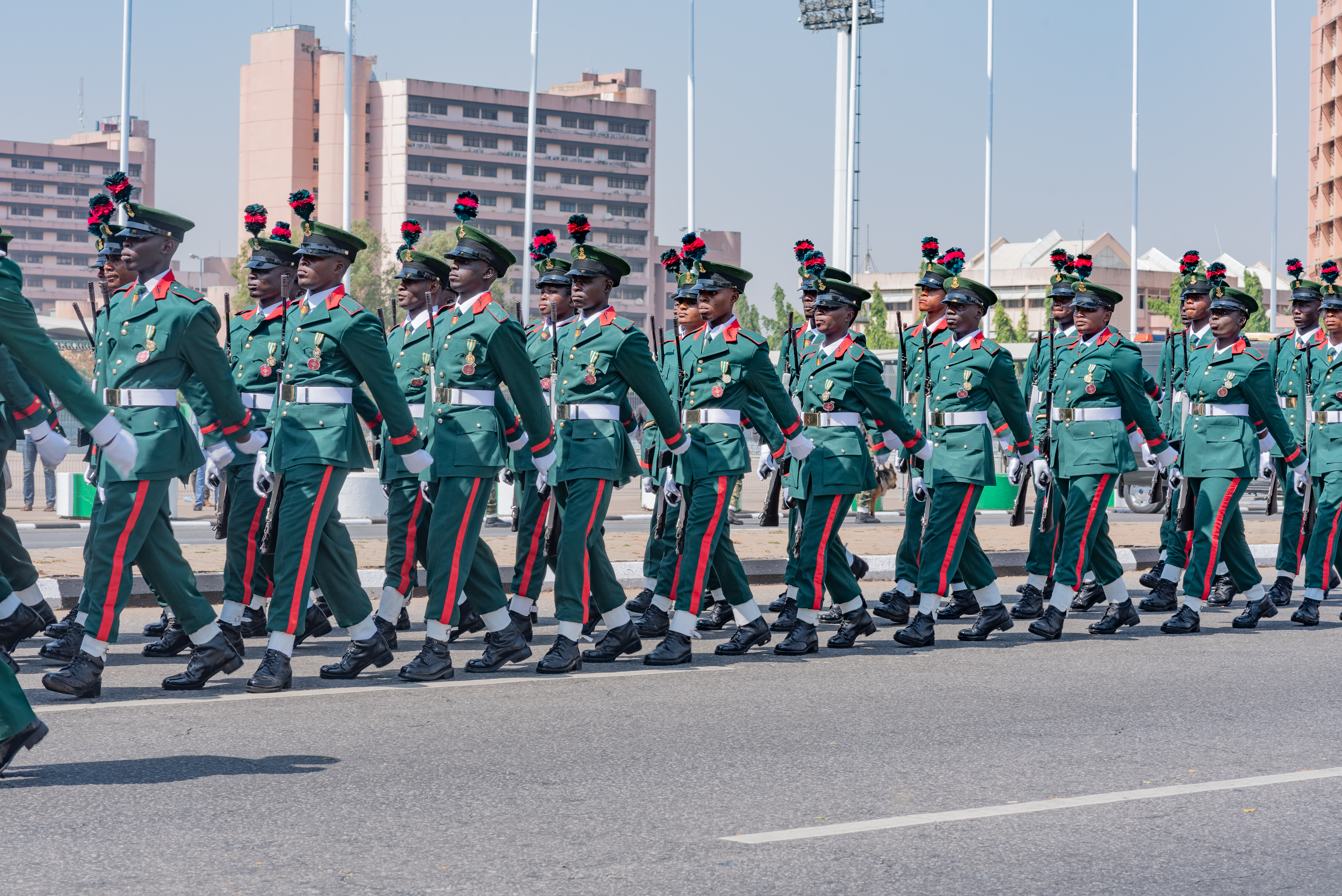
- The Guard Brigade during Armed Forces Remembrance Day.
- Active: September 1962 – present
- Country: Nigeria
- Branch: Nigerian Army
- Type: Guard of honour Protective security unit
- Role: The protection of the President of Nigeria and the Federal Capital Territory
- Size: Brigade (3 battalions)
- Headquarters: Camp Wu Bassey, Abuja
- Nickname: The Brigade of Guards
- Anniversaries: Armed Forces Day

Commanders
- Current commander: Brigadier General Adebisi Onasanya

Insignia
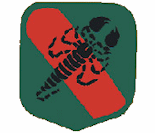
- Shoulder Patch

The Presidential Guards Brigade (or simply Guards Brigade or alternatively the Brigade of Guards) is the protective security unit brigade of the Nigerian Army (NA) responsible for counterintelligence to prevent assassination or sabotage of the Aso Rock Presidential Villa, crowd control in the event of chaos, important ceremonial duties in various ceremonies, protecting the President of Nigeria, public security, and support military operations. The members of the brigade are a group of Nigerian soldiers who guard the residence of the President and his guests, as well as perform ceremonial duties. This unit, according to AllAfrica with reference to a senior army official, "does not answer to Army Headquarters or to the Chief of Army Staff in any operational matters and its commander is completely integrated into the President's security team."

== Composition ==
It is composed of the following smaller units:

- Guards Brigade Headquarters
- Guards Brigade Garrison, Mambilla, Asokoro (Yakubu Gowon Barracks, Mambilla)
- 7 Guards Battalion (Lungi Barracks, Maitama)
- 102 Guards Battalion (Suleja)
- 176 Guards Battalion (Gwagwalada)
- 177 Guards Battalion (Keffi)
- Guards Brigade Medical Centre (Yakubu Gowon Barracks, Mambilla, Asokoro)
- Guards Brigade Band
  - Presidential Pipe Band

== History ==
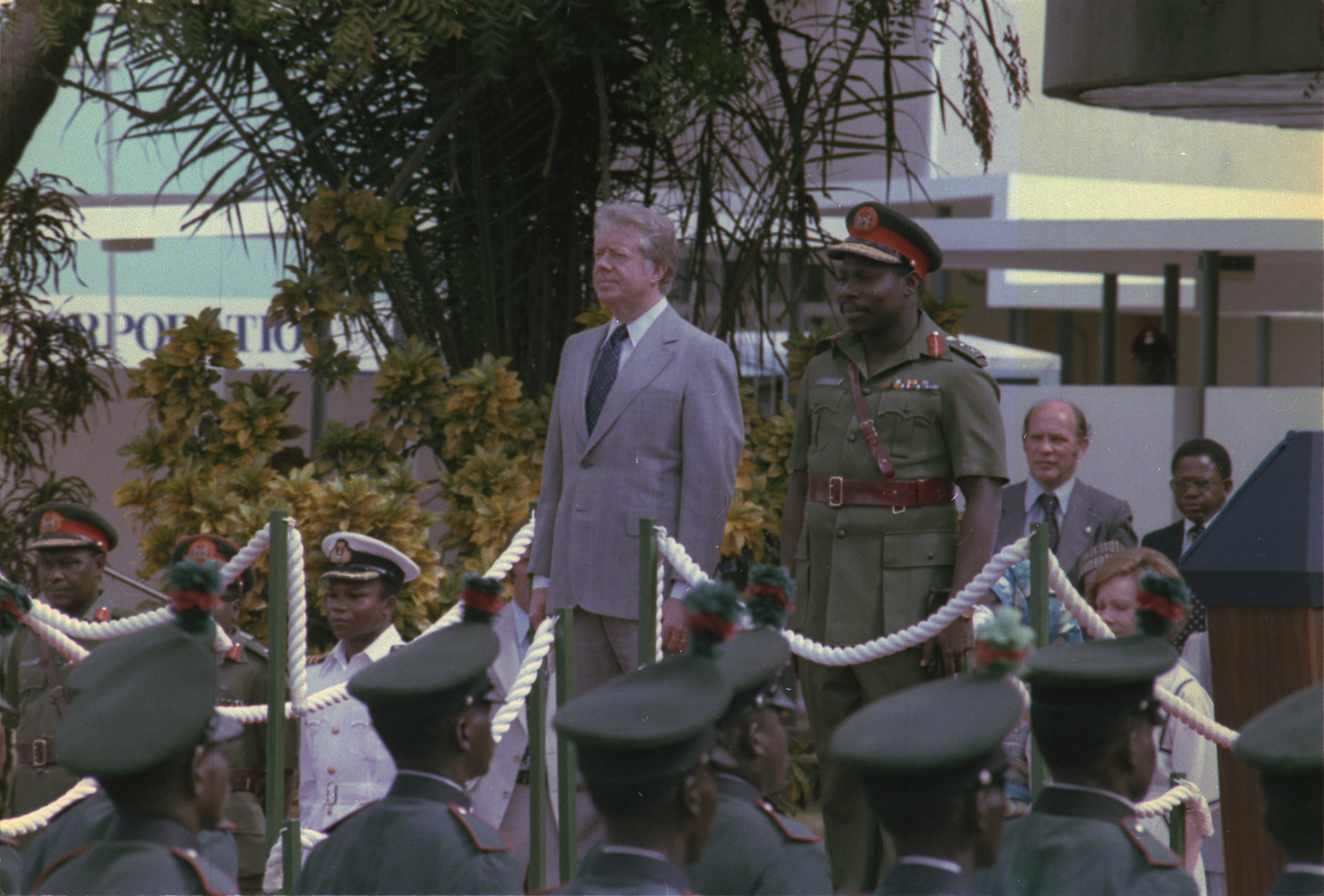
President Jimmy Carter and General Olusegun Obasanjo at a welcoming ceremony performed by the Guards Brigade.

The Presidential Guard Brigade of the Nigerian Army was formed in September 1962 as the Federal Guards. It was created for the purpose of carrying out ceremonial and security duties in Lagos and Abuja similar to the role of the British Household Division in London. In May 1966, Major General Johnson Aguiyi-Ironsi, who was the leader of the Nigerian military junta, renamed the Federal Guards to the National Guards. The soldiers who killed Ironsi on 29 July 1966, were drawn from the National Guards unit in Lagos. This operation lead to significant controversy over the area of responsibility and chain of command within the brigade.

In late 2018, the brigade was accused of carrying out a massacre in the capital of Abuja against Shia Muslims who were members of the Islamic Movement in Nigeria. The protesters of the IMN who were at the scene were protesting the imprisonment of Ibrahim Zakzaky, a Shia cleric who is the leader of the IMN and has stayed in detention since December 2016. At least 45 IMN protesters were killed in the massacre.

== Protective duties ==
The Guards Brigade provides security for the following individuals in the Nigerian presidential line of succession and with relevance to the President:

- President of Nigeria
- First Lady of Nigeria
- Vice President of Nigeria
- President of Senate
- Speaker House of Representatives
- Chief Justice of Nigeria

It works with the Nigeria Police Force in securing any area in the Federal Capital Territory.

== Ceremonial actions and other traditions ==
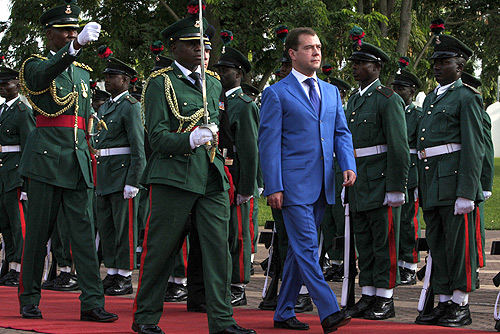
Russian President Dmitry Medvedev inspecting the Guards Brigade during a visit to Nigeria in June 2009.

Members of the brigade stand at the Presidential Villa in Aso Rock and also raise and lower the national flag at ceremonies and parades. The brigade holds a weekly changing of the guard ceremony outside Aso Villa. It also mounts the guard of honor on behalf of the Nigerian Armed Forces during national events such as the Armed Forces Day festivities and the national Independence Day Parade. It has also mounted the guard of honor during state arrival ceremonies for foreign dignitaries who undertake state visits to Abuja. Dignitaries who have inspected the brigade while on state visits have included Dmitry Medvedev, Recep Tayyip Erdoğan and Jacob Zuma. Regular performances also took place at occasions when foreign ambassadors presented their diplomatic credentials to the President, as well as during the official arrival and departure of the State President from various cities, especially those cities in which his official residences were situated.

Other past ceremonial events in which the PG was present include the following:

- In 2010, the brigade solemnly escorted President Umaru Yar'Adua as he returned to Nigeria shortly before his death.
- The brigade fired a 21-gun salute during the Inauguration of Muhammadu Buhari on 29 May 2015.
- The brigade's drill unit took part in the August 2019 Royal Edinburgh Military Tattoo alongside the Guards Band.
- During the acting presidency of Yemi Osinbajo in the spring of 2017, the Guards Band performed special Yoruba honor songs every time he returned to the presidential residence.
- In 2018, the guards performed a routine during the National Day in Cameroon.
- In 2017, the Guards Brigade showcased the change of guard's parade in front of the cenotaph in Abuja.

=== Regimental dinner ===
The brigade holds an annual regimental dinner at the brigade's mess hall (nicknamed Scorpion Mess) of the Brigade of Guards. It is usually held at the end of the year and takes place annually. As per protocol, the semi-formal green mess dress uniform is usually worn by officers and personnel on this occasion. In 2016, a special dinner was held in honor of the victories over Boko Haram, with President Buhari being the guest of honor. During the dinner, the Chief of Army Staff, Lieutenant General Tukur Yusuf Buratai presented a captured Boko Haram flag, recovered from Camp Zero, to the brigade. President Buhari also for a brief moment directed the Guards Brigade Band.

=== Sports competition ===
The Guards Brigade Sporting Competition is held annually by the brigade as an inter-unit tournament of sports such as: football, basketball, volleyball, table tennis, boxing, judo, taekwondo, and a combat relay race. Units that have participated in the past include 176 Battalion, 177 Guards Battalion, 102 Battalion and the Guards Brigade Garrison.

== Brigade cemetery ==
The Guards Brigade cemetery located off Murtala Muhammed Way in Abuja. It serves as a place for the burial of serving and retired brigade personnel. The cemetery was inaugurated in 2017 to commemorate Armed Forces Remembrance Day. It was created as part of an initiative by General Buratai, who directed all army formations to set up their own unit cemeteries. The cemetery comprises a cenotaph, memorial hall and guard house for soldiers on duty.

== Commanders ==
- Brigadier Wellington Duke Bassey (September 1962 – 1968)
- Colonel Joseph Nanven Garba (1968 – February 1976)
- Brigadier Mamman Jiya Vatsa (February 1976 – 1979)
- Colonel Mohammed Kaliel (1981–1984)
- Lieutenant Colonel Abdulazeez Sabo Aliyu (1984–1985)
- Colonel John Mark Inienger (1988–1989)
- Brigadier General Bashir Salihi Magashi (1993–1996)
- Major General Babagana Monguno (August 2007 – January 2009)
- Brigadier General A.S. Mustapha (2009–2010)
- Major General Musa Sani Yusuf (2014–2018)
- Brigadier General Umar Thomas Musa (2018 – 4 August 2019)
- Brigadier General Mohammed Takuti Usman (4 August 2019 – 20 January 2023)
- Brigadier General Aminu Umar (20 January 2023 – 4 July 2023)
- Brigadier General Adebisi Olusola Onasanya (4 July 2023 – present)

== See also ==
- National Ceremonial Guard
- Brigade of the Guards
