= 2 Division (Nigeria) =

Nigerian army division

Headquarters 2 Division
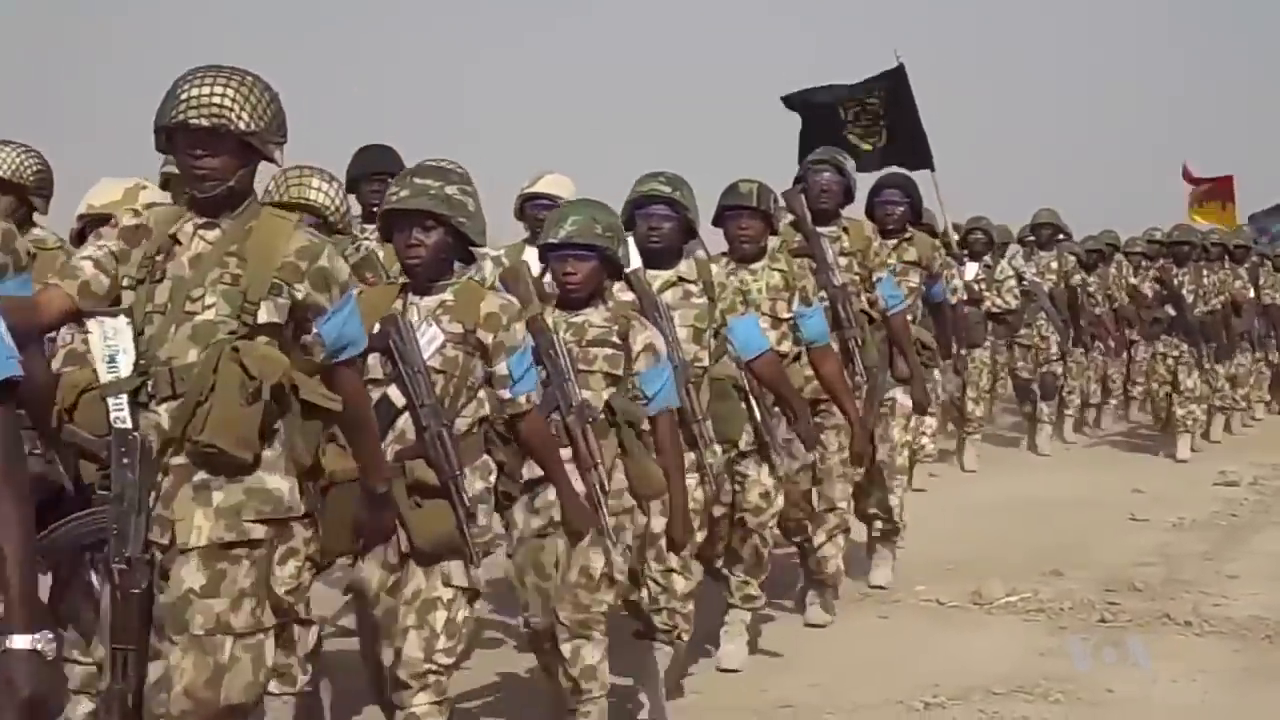
- Soldiers of the 2nd division (leopard on black flag) in Sambisa Forest, 2017.
- Active: 1967–present
- Country: Nigeria
- Type: Mechanized Infantry
- Role: Combat support
- Size: Division
- Part of: Nigerian Army
- Garrison/HQ: Ibadan, Nigeria

Commanders
- General Officer Commanding: Major General Chinedu Nnebeife
- Notable commanders: General Murtala Mohammed; General Sani Abacha; Major General Bashir Salihi Magashi

The 2 Division, Nigerian Army is a division, active since the colonial era. Its headquarters are now at Ibadan in the South-West. The current and 47th General Officer Commanding (GOC) is Major General Chinedu Nnebeife.

== Operations ==
The division is "charged with the responsibility of securing its Area of Responsibility (AOR) covering the South Western flank of Nigeria and also ensuring that the borders located in its AOR are secured. The division is a mechanized infantry (sic: formation) with affiliated combat support and combat service support units."

At the start of the Nigerian Civil War, the 2 Division was responsible for the beating back of the Biafran Army to the River Niger.

The division perpetrated the Asaba massacre under the command of Murtala Muhammed on October 5-7 1967.

== Structure ==
The division previously included:

- 2 Division Headquarters (Ibadan)
  - 4th Brigade (Benin City)
    - 19th Battalion (Okitipupa)
    - 195th Battalion
  - 12 Brigade (Lokoja)
  - 22 Brigade (Ilorin)
    - 154th Task Force Battalion
    - 221st Light Tank Battalion
    - 222nd Mechanised Battalion
  - 32 Artillery Brigade (Abeokuta)
    - 321st Field Artillery Regiment
    - 322nd Field Artillery Regiment
    - 323rd Air Defence Regiment
  - 42 Brigade (Akure)
  - 42 Engineer Brigade (Ibadan)
  - 2nd Division Signals & Logistics Formations
    - 52 Signal Regiment(Ibadan)
    - 72 Supply and Transport Brigade
    - 2 Division Ordnance Services
    - 2 Division Electrical and Mechanical Engineers (DEME)
    - 2 Division Military Hospital

== GOCs ==
- Colonel Murtala Muhammed (1967 – June 1968)
- Brigadier Sani Abacha (January 1984 – August 1985)
- Major General Bashir Salihi Magashi (1996–1997)
- Brigadier General Jude Egbudom (acting) (2015 – 8 July 2016)
- Major General Kasimu Abdulkarim (8 July 2016 – 2017)
- Major General C.M. Abraham (2017 – 16 January 2018)
- Major General Okwudili Fidelis Azinta (16 January 2018 – 23 July 2019)
- Major General Anthony Omozoje (23 July 2019 – 12 March 2021)
- Major General Gold Chibuisi (12 March 2021 – 12 August 2022)
- Major General Aminu Chinade (12 August 2022 – 31 January 2023)
- Major General Mohammed Usman (31 January 2023 – 13 July 2023)
- Major General Valentine Okoro (13 July 2023 – 23 August 2023)
- Major General Bamidele Alabi (23 August 2023 – 14 March 2024)
- Major General Obinna Onubogu (14 March 2024 – 19 August 2025)
- Major General Chinedu Nnebeife (19 August 2025 – Present)
