= Nigerian Army =

Land warfare branch of Nigeria's military

- Emblem of the Nigerian Army
- Founded: 1956 (in current form) 6 July 1863; 163 years ago (as Glover Hausas)
- Country: Nigeria
- Type: Army
- Role: Land warfare
- Size: 160,000 (2020) and a reserve 1.8 million
- Part of: Nigerian Armed Forces
- Headquarters: Nigerian Army Headquarters, Armed Forces Complex, Muhammadu Buhari Way, Garki, Abuja, FCT.
- Motto: "Victory is from God alone!"
- Anniversaries: Nigerian Army Day (6 July)
- Engagements: Congo Crisis; Nigerian Civil War; First Liberian Civil War; Sierra Leone Civil War; Conflict in the Niger Delta; Boko Haram insurgency Northern Mali War; Invasion of the Gambia; Insurgency in Southeastern Nigeria; Nigerian bandit conflict
- Website: army.mil.ng

Commanders
- Commander-in-Chief: President Bola Tinubu
- Minister of Defence: General Christopher Musa
- Minister of State, Defence: Bello Matawalle
- Chief of Defence Staff: General Olufemi Oluyede
- Chief of Army Staff: Lieutenant General Waidi Shaibu
- Notable commanders: Thomas Aguiyi-Ironsi; Yakubu Gowon; Murtala Muhammed; Olusegun Obasanjo; Muhammadu Buhari; Ibrahim Babangida; Sani Abacha; Abdulsalami Abubakar; Theophilus Danjuma; Maxwell Khobe; Tukur Buratai

Insignia
- Flag

Aircraft flown
- Helicopter: Bell UH-1 Iroquois
- TB II Armed RPA

The Nigerian Army (NA) is the land force of the Nigerian Armed Forces. It is the largest component of the Nigerian Armed Forces. The President of Nigeria is the Commander-in-Chief of the Nigerian Army, and its professional head is the Chief of Army Staff, who is the highest ranking military officer of the Nigerian Army. It is governed by the Nigerian Army Council (NAC). The Nigerian Army is operationally and geographically divided into ten divisions, the basic field formation. The army has been involved in operations throughout the country, most especially during the Nigerian Civil War, and has undertaken major operations abroad. Nigerian Army officers have served as chiefs of defence in other countries, with Brigadier General Maxwell Khobe serving as Sierra Leone chief of staff in 1998–1999, and Nigerian officers acting as Command Officer-in-Charge of the Armed Forces of Liberia from at least 2007.

== History ==
=== Formation ===
The Nigerian Army traces its history to Lieutenant John Hawley Glover's Constabulary Force, which was largely composed of freed Hausa slaves in 1863. The Constabulary Force was established with the primary goal of protecting the Royal Niger Company and its assets from constant military incursions by the neighboring Ashanti Empire. This policing force would slowly grow in size and capability to meet the needs of the British Empire in its West African territories, and would later form the nucleus of both the Gold Coast and the Hausa Constabulary, both of which would become the Ghana Regiment and Southern Nigeria Regiment respectively by 1879. These regiments would be incorporated into the Royal West African Frontier Force (RWAFF) in 1900 by the British Colonial Office, following British military experiences in the Benin Expedition of 1897, as well as wider British efforts of complete reorganization of its African colonial units such as that of the Egyptian Army earlier in the year. During the Second World War, British-trained Nigerian troops saw action with the 1st (West Africa) Infantry Brigade, the 81st and the 82nd (West Africa) Divisions which fought in the East African and Burma campaigns.

=== Independence ===
The roots of the ethnic cleavages which started to rip through the army after independence had some of their origins in colonial recruiting practices, with line infantry and the artillery being raised from the North, but during the expansion of the force during the Second World War a large proportion of more educated southerners being brought in to take up posts that required more technical training. Like in Ghana, there was significant pressure to "Nigerianize" the armed forces, with, for example, two officers being promoted to Brigadier as a concession to public opinion on the occasion of the last British commander arriving in Lagos. From a force of 8,000 in five infantry battalions and supporting units, strength rose to around 120,000 in three divisions by the end of the Nigerian Civil War in 1970. In terms of doctrine, the task of the Federal Nigerian army did not fundamentally change: its task remained to close with and defeat an organized enemy.

=== Civil War ===
The rapid expansion of the Nigerian Army in the wake of the civil war witnessed a severe decline in troop quality. The expansion process overseen by the Nigerian army command staff led to an extreme shortage of commissioned officers, with newly created lieutenant-colonels commanding brigades, and platoons and companies often commanded by sergeants and warrant officers. This resulted in tentative command-and-control and in rudimentary staff work by Nigerian army personnel. One result of the weak direction was that the federal government's three field divisions fought independently, and competed for men and material. Writing in a 1984 study, Major Michael Stafford of the United States Marine Corps noted the following: "Inexperienced, poorly trained and ineptly led soldiers manifested their lack of professionalism and indiscipline by massacres of innocent civilians and a failure to effectively execute infantry tactics." Among the results of this failure of command experience and professionalism was the 1967 Asaba massacre, resulting in the deaths of some one thousand civilians and individuals of Igbo descent.

In November 1970, the U.S. intelligence community concluded the following: "The Nigerian Civil War ended with surprisingly little rancor. The defeated Igbos are accepted as fellow citizens in many parts of Nigeria, but not in some areas of former Biafra where they were once dominant. [Iboland] is an overpoperated, economically depressed area, where massive unemployment is likely to prevail for some years." Furthermore, U.S. analysts would go on to state that: "Nigeria is still very much a tribal society, in which clan, tribal and regional jealousies, hostilities and interests count for more than national attachment. General Gowon, Head of the Federal Military Government (FMG), is the accepted national leader and his popularity has grown since the end of the war. The FMG is neither very efficient nor dynamic, but the recent announcement that it intends to retain power for six more years has generated little opposition so far. The Nigerian Army, vastly expanded during the war, is both the main support to the FMG and the chief threat to it. The troops are poorly trained and disciplined and some of the officers are turning to conspiracies and plotting. We think Gowon will have great difficulty in staying in office through the period which he said is necessary before the turnover of power to civilians. His sudden removal would dim the prospects for Nigerian stability."

The influence of individual personalities is generally greater in the armies of developing states, as they tend to have weaker institutional frameworks. Key personalities involved in Nigeria included then-Colonel Olusegun Obasanjo. Obasanjo was particularly important due to his efforts to reorganize his command, 3 Division, during the civil war to improve its logistics and administration. The reorganization he instituted permitted 3 Division to successfully conduct the offensive operations that would ultimately lead to the end the civil war in Nigeria. The Nigerian Army fought the Civil War significantly under-resourced; Obasanjo's memoirs chronicle the lack of any stocks of extra equipment for mobilisation and the "haphazard and unreliable system of procurement and provisioning" which lasted for the entire period of the war. Arms embargoes imposed by several Western countries made the situation more difficult.

=== Post-war ===
At the end of the Civil War, the three divisions of the Army were reorganised into four divisions, with each controlling territories running from North to South in order to deemphasise the former regional structure. Each division thus had access to the sea thereby making triservice cooperation and logistic support easier. This deployment formula was later abandoned in favour of the present assignment of sectors to the divisions. Thus 1 Division with HQ at Kaduna is allocated the North West sector; 2 Division with HQ at Ibadan South West sector, 3 Division with HQ at Jos North East sector and 82 Division with HQ at Enugu South East sector.

=== Recent history ===
Its formations include the 1 Division, headquartered in Kaduna in the north-west, and 2 Division (HQ Ibadan in the South-West, which includes 32 Artillery Brigade at Abeokuta). 2nd Division also possibly includes 4 Brigade at Benin City, with 19 Battalion at Okitipupa and 195 Battalion at Agenebode. 52 Signal Regiment may be the divisional signals unit. 3 Division's headquarters is at Rukuba Cantonment, Jos, in the North-East, and includes 21 Armoured Brigade Maiduguri, 23 Brigade Yola, and 33 Artillery Brigades. 81st Division (Amphibious) HQ in Lagos, which includes the 9 Brigade, based at Ikeja Cantonment in northern Lagos, 82nd Division (Airborne and Amphibious) HQ in Enugu in the South-East, which includes the 2 Brigade at Port Harcourt, 13 Brigade at Calabar and the 34th Artillery Brigade at Obinze/Owerri. The Composite Division at Enugu was formed in 1964 as 4 Division, in 1975 became Lagos Garrison Organization; in 1981 became 4 Composite Division; became a Composite Division in May 2002. 3rd Armoured Division was responsible in 1983 for the security of areas bordering Chad.

Lagos and Abuja have garrison commands, with the Lagos garrison as large as a division. 81st Division was previously the youngest division, formed on 26 May 2002 when the Lagos Garrison Command (as it then was) was upgraded to divisional status. The Division, therefore, inherited the security roles hitherto performed by the defunct Lagos Garrison Command. However a later undated article in a Nigerian online newspaper says the 81st Division was later again renamed the Lagos Garrison Command. In the 1980s, the Army's brigades included the 7th Infantry Brigade in Sokoto. There are also Divisional Artillery Brigades, among which are the 32 and 34 Artillery Brigades, ordnance corps units as well as Combat Engineer Regiments, and many other service support units spread across the country.

The 7th Division (also known as JTF-RO) was established in August 2013 for the war against Boko Haram. The creation of the new division brought to six the number of divisions. The 7th division is headquartered in Maiduguri. The division includes a combat motorcycle unit as part of its 25th Task Force Brigade. The purpose of this unit is stated as securing roads in Yobe and serving as a force multiplier in combat operations. Training and Doctrine Command formed in 1981, and is located at Minna. It supervises the Army's schools, including the Depot.

On 27 April 2023, the Nigerian Army conducted the largest Presentation of Colours in the Commonwealth on Eagle Square, Abuja, issuing 53 new colors to preexisting units and 28 colors to newly established units (81 colours being issued in total).

== Organisation ==
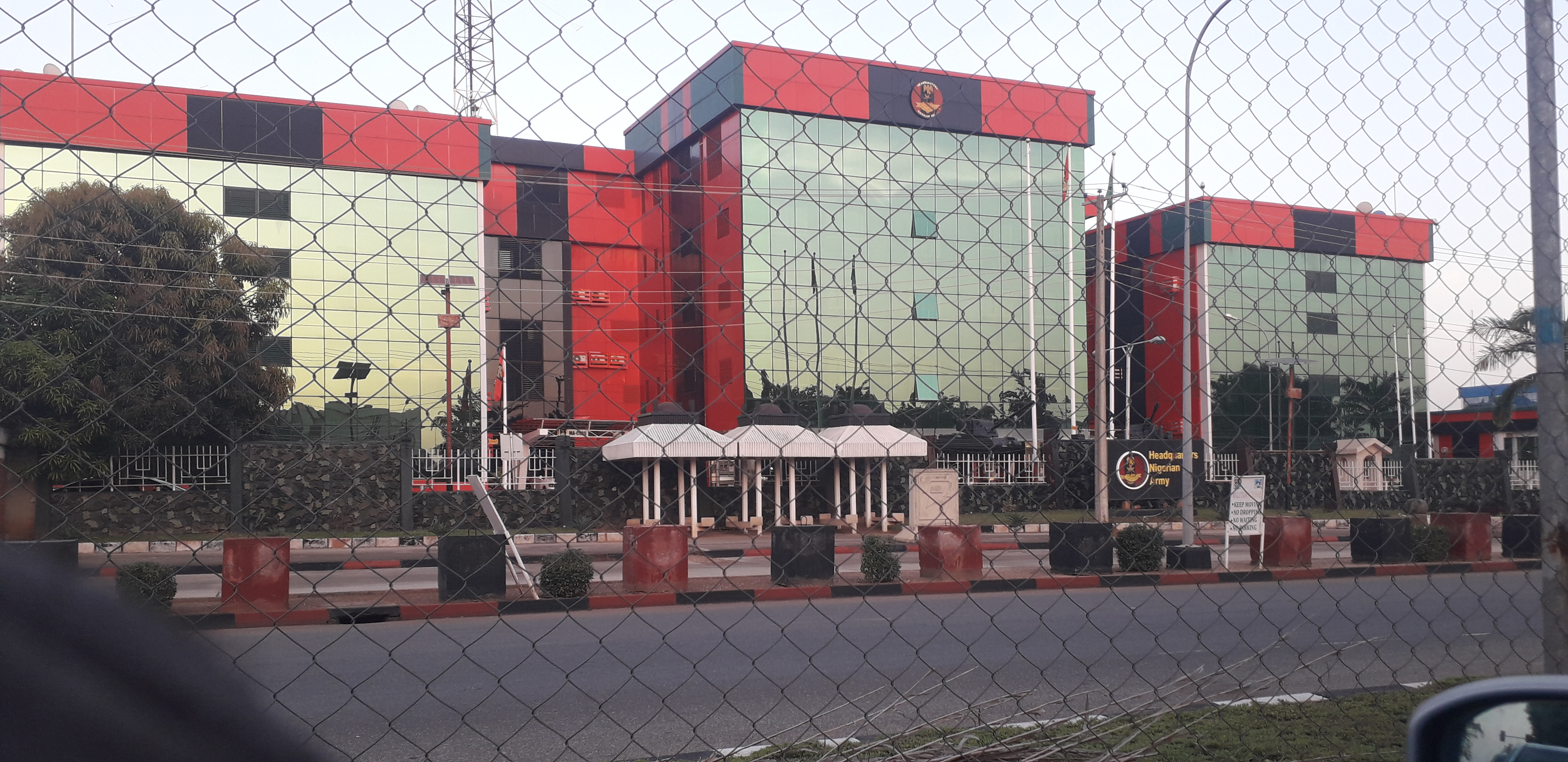
The Nigerian Army headquarters building.

The Nigerian Army as of 2016 consisted of some 6,000 officers, 400,000 Reserve personnel and 150,000 enlisted personnel.

=== Leadership ===
Army Headquarters is located in the Armed Forces Complex in Abuja, FCT, and is responsible for providing forces at operational readiness for employment by the Nigerian Defence Headquarters. The command structure is hierarchical, with overall command residing with the Chief of the Army Staff (COAS) (currently Lieutenant General Waidi Shaibu), who is immediately subordinate to the Chief of Defence Staff, the professional head of the armed forces. The COAS is supported by various department heads. The army itself is governed by the Nigerian Army Council (NAC). It is supported by the civilian Army Affairs Department of the Ministry of Defence, which acts as the NAC's Secretariat.

=== Departments ===
- Department of Army Policy and Plans
- Department of Army Administration
- Department of Army Training
- Department of Army Operations
- Department of Special Services and Programs
- Department of Civil-Military Affairs
- Department of Standard and Evaluation
- Department Army Transformation and Innovation
- Department of Army Logistics
- Department of Military Secretary

=== Personnel corps ===
The Nigerian Army is functionally organized into combat arms, which are infantry and armoured; the combat support arms, which are artillery, engineers, signals, and intelligence.

=== Formations ===
The Nigerian Army operates through geographical and tactical Divisions, each tasked with regional defense, counter-insurgency, and internal security.

To tackle rising security challenges across the country, President Bola Tinubu approved a restructuring of the Army, expanding its force structure from eight to twelve operational divisions. The expansion created four new divisional headquarters—5 Division (Makurdi), 9 Division (Ilorin), 10 Division (Jalingo), and 83 Division (Benin City)—and included the recruitment of 28,000 additional personnel to improve command and control, border security, and regional response times.

Name	Headquarters	Subunits
1st Mechanized Division	Kaduna	1st Mechanised Brigade; 3rd Motorised Brigade; 17th Brigade; 31st Field Artillery Brigade; 41st Engineer Brigade; 214th Recce Battalion
2nd Mechanized Division	Ibadan	4th Mechanised Brigade; 9th Motorised Brigade; 12th Brigade; 32nd Field Artillery Brigade; 42nd Engineer Brigade; 244th Recce Battalion
3rd Armoured Division	Jos	23rd Armoured Brigade; 33rd Field Artillery Brigade; 43rd Engineer Brigade; 243rd Recce Battalion
6th Amphibious Division	Port Harcourt	2nd Brigade; 16th Brigade; 63rd Brigade; 46th Engineer Brigade; Recce Battalion
7th Infantry Division	Maiduguri	21st Brigade; 22nd Brigade; 23rd Brigade; 47th Engineer Brigade; 241st Recce Battalion
8th Division	Sokoto	1st Brigade; 17th Brigade; 48th Engineer Brigade; 248th Recce Battalion
81st Division (Amphibious)	Lagos	19th Mechanised Battalion; 165th Mechanised Battalion; 242nd Recce Battalion
82nd Composite Division (Airborne and Amphibious)	Enugu	2nd Amphibious Brigade; 13th Motorised Brigade; 34th Field Artillery Brigade.; 93rd Amphibious Battalion; 103rd Amphibious Battalion, Garikki.; 146th Amphibious Battalion; 245th Recce Battalion
Presidential Guards Brigade	Abuja, Federal Capital Territory	7 Guards Battalion.; 177 Amphibious Guards Battalion.; 176 Guards Battalion.; 102 Guards Battalion.

Location of Nigerian Army units

=== Army locations ===
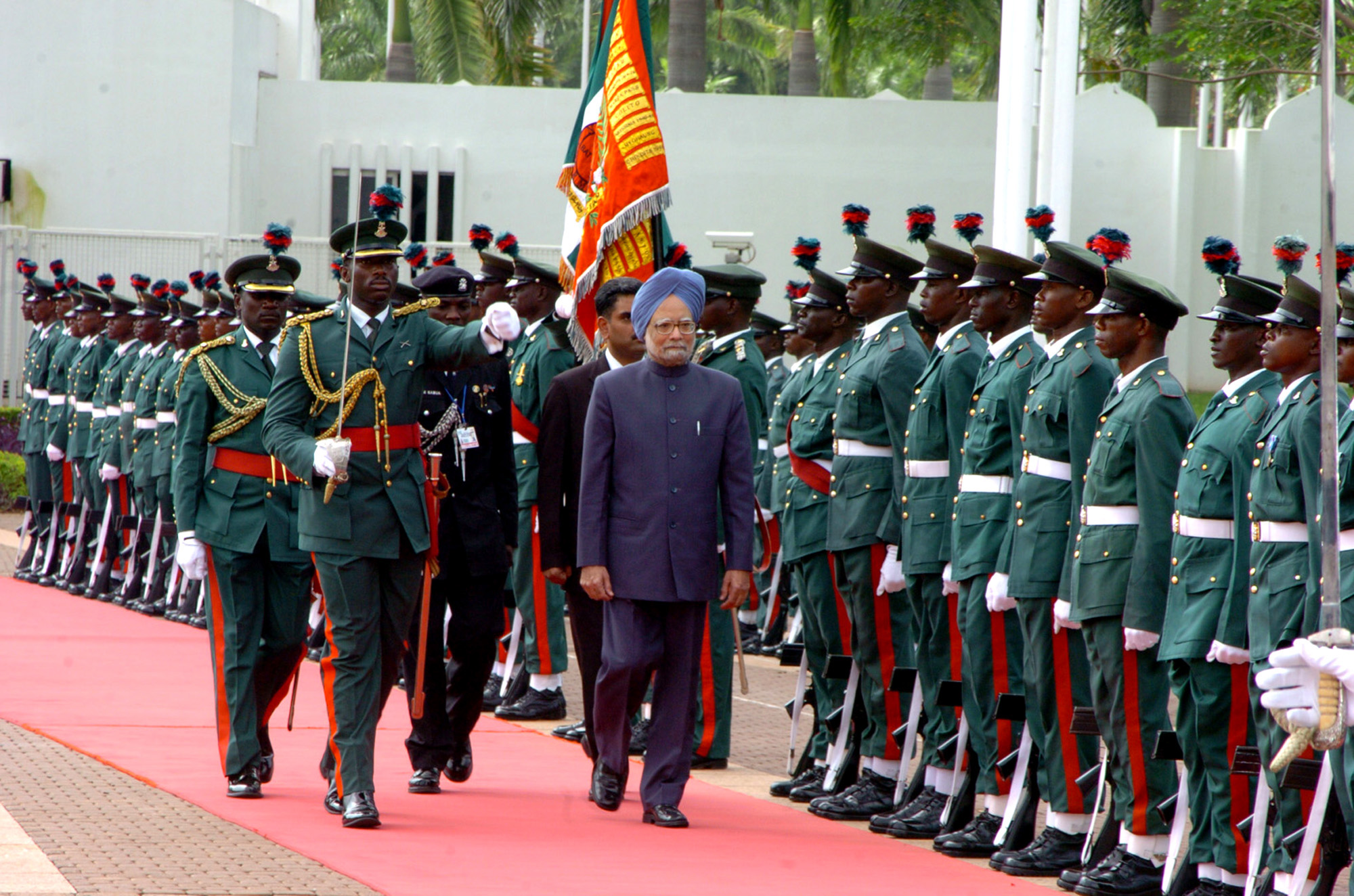
Indian Prime Minister Manmohan Singh inspecting the Presidential Guard Brigade during his visit to Abuja in October 2007.

The following are installations owned by the Nigerian Army:

- Ribadu Cantonment (Kaduna)
- Adaka Boro Barracks (Elele)
- Giwa Barracks (Maiduguri)
- Maimalari Barracks (Maiduguri)
- Fort Nagwamatse (Kontagora)
- Obienu Barracks (Bauchi)
- Ejoor Barracks (Effurun)
- Camp Wu Bassey (Abuja)
- Niger Barracks (Formerly Fort IBB) (formerly Fort Obasanjo) in Abuja
- Mogadishu Cantonment (Formerly Sani Abacha Barracks) (Abuja)
- Mambilla Barracks (Formerly Yakubu Gowon Barracks) (Abuja)
- Aguiyi-Ironsi Barracks (Abuja)
- Lungi Barracks (Formerly Gado Nasko Barracks) (Abuja)

=== Special Operations Command ===
The Nigerian Army Special Operations Command (also known as the 4 Special Forces Command) is an operational command of the Nigerian Army dedicated to counter-insurgency, counter-terrorism, asymmetric warfare, and direct action operations. Established as part of the broader force-reorganization under Lieutenant General Tukur Yusuf Buratai in the late 2010s, the command coordinates the training, deployment, and operational readiness of elite ground combat units across Nigeria.

- NASOC HQ (Doma, Nasarawa State)
  - 401 Special Forces Brigade
  - 403 Amphibious Brigade

== Training ==
The Training and Doctrine Command (TRADOC) located in Minna is responsible for doctrinal, training and combat development, and supervises training centers.

=== Officers ===
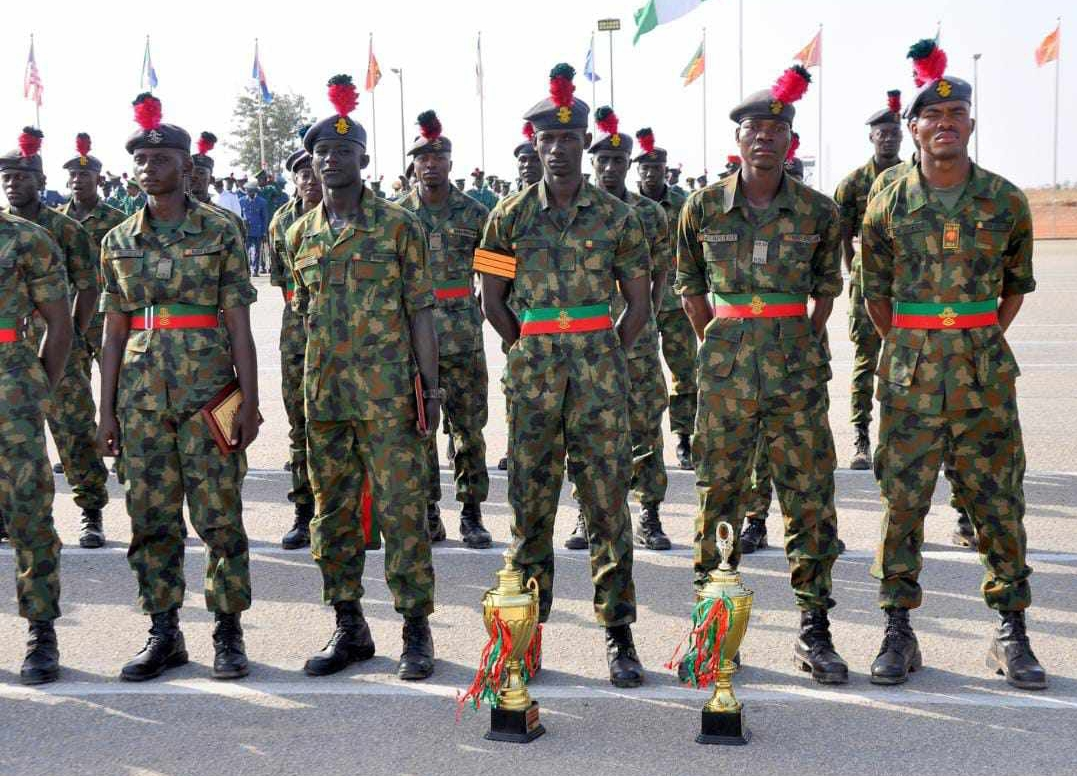
A 2022 Army DSSC graduation.

There are several paths to becoming a commissioned officer including the Nigerian Defence Academy, Short Service Commission, Direct Short Service Commission and Executive Commission. The differences are as follows:

- Regular Commission is represented by the Nigerian Defence Academy (NDA). The duration of training at the NDA is five years (four years academic and one year military).
- Direct Short Service Commission (DSSCs) is for applicants who have graduated from civilian universities in Nigeria. This type of commission provides for commissions for specializations such as medicine, law, engineering, and chaplains.
- Short Service Commissions (SSCs) are is a special commissions into the combat arms.
- Executive Commission is for serving enlisted soldiers.

Regardless of which road an officer takes, the insignia are the same.

=== Enlisted personnel ===
For enlisted personnel, the main recruit training program of the Nigerian Army is held at Depot Nigerian Army, Zaria. The age of entry is between 17 and 22. Established in 1924 and located at the Chindit Cantonment in Sabon Gari, Zaria, Kaduna State, it is the oldest and most historic military training institution in Nigeria. It was founded as the Regimental Depot of the Nigeria Regiment under the RWAFF. Depot Nigerian Army, Osogbo, located in Osogbo, Osun State, was established on December 20, 2025 to decentralize the training process and ease the operational pressure on Zaria. An additional training depot at Amasiri-Edda in Ebonyi State was established in 2026. These institutions operate under the supervision of the TRADOC.

=== Others ===
There are 17 Corps Training Schools and the Nigerian Army College of Logistics (NACOL). The Army sponsors the Nigerian Military School at Zaria and Command Secondary Schools all over the federation.

=== Training ===
The Training and Doctrine Command (TRADOC) located in Minna is responsible for doctrinal, training and combat development, and supervises training centers. There are 17 Corps Training Schools and the Nigerian Army College of Logistics (NACOL). The Army sponsors the Nigerian Military School at Zaria and Command Secondary Schools all over the federation.

== Military forces abroad ==
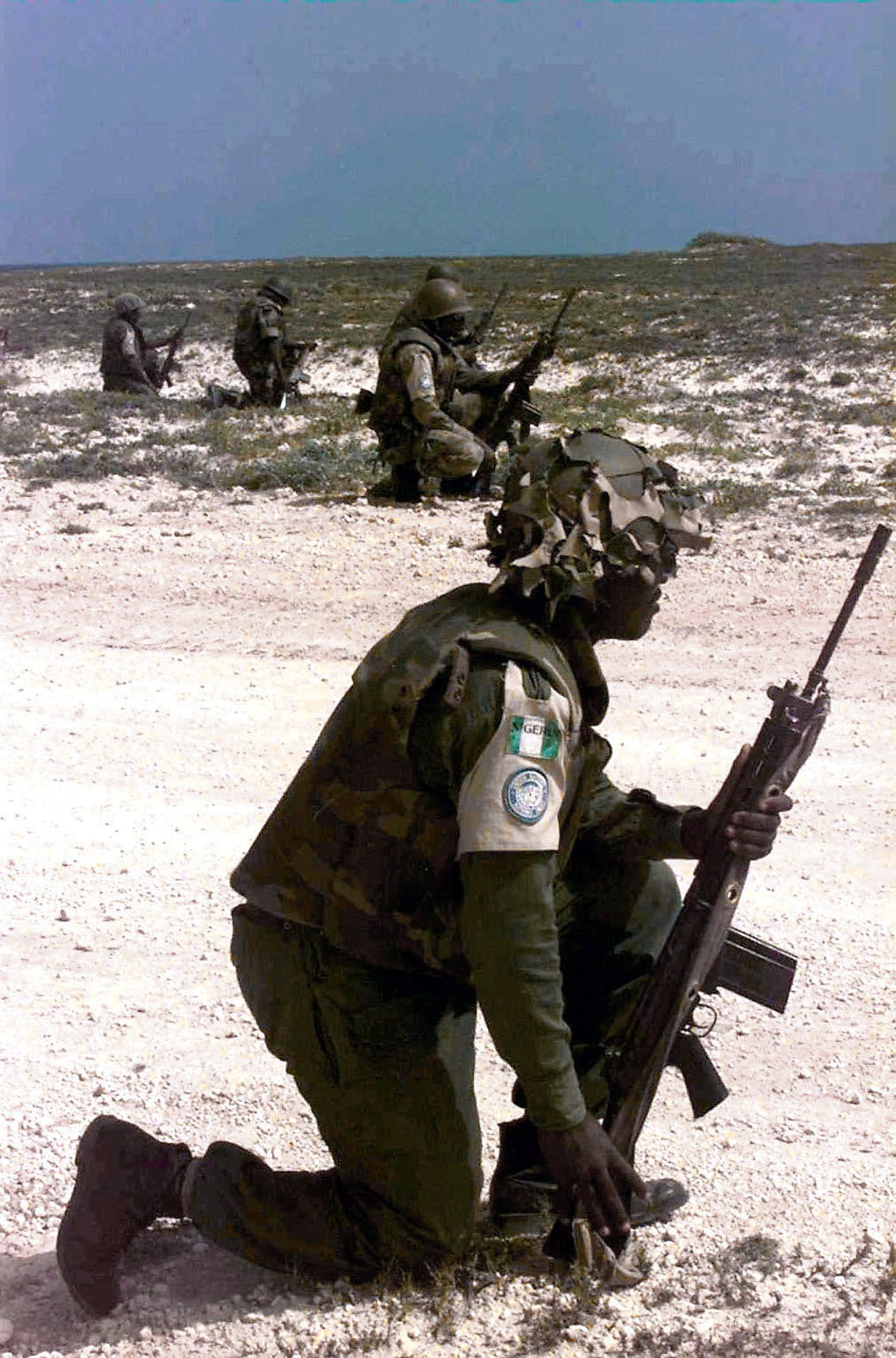
Nigerian soldiers in Somalia, 1993

In December 1983 the new régime of the Head of State of Nigeria, Major General Muhammadu Buhari, announced that Nigeria could no longer afford an activist anti-colonial role in Africa. Anglophone members of the Economic Community of West African States (ECOWAS) established ECOMOG, dominated by the Nigerian Army, in 1990 to intervene in the civil war in Liberia. Smaller army forces had previously carried out UN and ECOWAS deployments in the former Yugoslavia, Angola, Rwanda, Somalia, and Sierra Leone.

The anti-colonial policy statement did not deter Nigeria under Generals Ibrahim Babangida in 1990 and Sani Abacha in 1997 from sending peacekeeping troops as part of ECOMOG under the auspices of ECOWAS into Liberia and later into Sierra Leone when civil wars broke out in those countries. President Olusegun Obasanjo in August 2003 committed Nigerian troops once again into Liberia, at the urging of the United States, to provide an interim presence until the UN's force UNMIL arrived. Charles Taylor was subsequently eased out of power by U.S. pressure and exiled to Nigeria.

In October 2004, Nigerian troops were deployed into Darfur, Sudan to spearhead an African Union force to protect civilians there.

In January 2013, Nigeria began to deploy troops to Mali as part of the African-led International Support Mission to Mali.

Nigeria claimed to have contributed more than twenty thousand troops and police officers to various UN missions since 1960. The Nigeria Police Force and troops have served in places like UNIPOM (UN India-Pakistan Observer mission) 1965, UNIFIL in Lebanon 1978, the UN observer mission, UNIIMOG supervising the Iran-Iraq ceasefire in 1988, former Yugoslavia 1998, East Timor 1999, and in the Democratic Republic of the Congo (MONUC) 2004.

== Equipment ==
Despite a disproportionate emphasis on the materiel and sophistication of the Nigerian Armed Forces, the Army has been hamstrung by technical deficiency and an exceptionally poor standard of maintenance. Its overabundance of foreign suppliers, including Austria, Brazil, France, Germany, Italy, Sweden, Switzerland, Romania, Turkey, Ukraine, the former Soviet Union, the United States and the United Kingdom, has also complicated logistics, sustainment and personnel training pipelines.

Calculating the size and scope of replacement inventories alone is impossible given the menagerie of equipment in use. The Nigerian Army maintains at least eighty-two different weapon systems and 194 different types of ammunition (both small arms and large calibre), of sixty-two different categories, from fourteen manufacturers.

This includes different makes of small arms, which serve the same general function but have mutually incompatible parts (e.g. Type 56, AKM, Pm md. 90, AK-74); obsoleted weapons which are still within the logistics system despite being supplanted in frontline service (Sterling, FAL, D-30); and legacy platforms being operated long after their manufacturers have ceased maintenance support (Roland, Palmaria, FH-77).

== Aviation ==
The Nigerian Army achieved a historic milestone after it activated its Aviation Corps in 2024 when it took delivery of two Bell UH-1H, "Huey" helicopters. The Nigerian Army Aviation Corps has over 60 aircraft on order which includes:

- Bell UH-1H (36 ordered)
- Cayuse Warrior Scout
- Bell 412Ep
- Eurocopter EC135
- Bell UH-1D
- MF212 (20 units ordered)
- HAL Prachand (4 units planned)

About $3.2 million was allocated for the development of a hangar to accommodate these incoming fleet at the Bola Ahmed Tinubu International Airport, Minna, Niger State.

After reports indicated their purchase of 4 units HAL Prachand helicopters, it was revealed that Nigerian pilots were being trained in India on helicopters like HAL Dhruv for operating the HAL Prachand.

== See also ==
- Zaki Biam Massacre
- Timeline of Boko Haram insurgency
