= Supreme Military Council of Nigeria (1966–1979) =

Military deputy leader in command of Nigeria (1966-1979)

Supreme Military Council

Overview
- Established: 15 January 1966
- Dissolved: 1 October 1979
- State: Nigeria
- Leader: President (Yakubu Gowon)
- Headquarters: Lagos

The Supreme Military Council was the body that ruled Nigeria after the 1966 coup d'état until it was dissolved following the 1979 parliamentary election and the Second Nigerian Republic. The Supreme Military Council was located at Dodan Barracks as the Supreme Military Headquarters (SMHQ) in Lagos.

According to a Constitutional Decree, published in Lagos on 17 March 1967, legislative and executive power was vested in the Supreme Military Council. The chairman of the council was the head of the Military Government.

The Supreme Military Council consisted of the Regional Military Governors and the Military Administrator of the Federal Territory, the Heads of the Nigerian Army, Navy and Air Force, the Chief of Staff of the Armed Forces and the Inspector-General of Police or his Deputy.

The Supreme Military Council could delegate powers to a Federal Executive Council, predominantly composed of civilian Commissioners.

The initial President of the Supreme Military Council was Maj.-Gen. Yakubu Gowon, Commander-in-Chief of the Nigerian Armed Forces. He was replaced by Murtala Muhammed (in 1975) and Olusegun Obasanjo (in 1976) in successive coups.

Following the 1983 coup d'état, Muhammadu Buhari created another Supreme Military Council that lasted until the 1985 coup d'état.

== Members ==
Name	Title
Yakubu Gowon	Head of Federal Military Government (1966-1975)
Murtala Mohammed	Head of State (1975–76)
Rear-Admiral Joseph Edet Akinwale Wey	Chief of Naval Staff (1964 –1973), Chief of Staff of the Supreme Headquarters (1973–75)
Nelson Bossman Soroh	Chief of Naval Staff (1973–1975)
Michael Ayinde Adelanwa	Chief of Naval Staff (1975–1980)
Brig. Hassan U. Katsina	Military Governor, Northern Region (1966–67), Chief of Army Staff (1968–71)
Brig. Emmanuel Ekpo	Chief of Staff, Supreme Headquarters
Joseph Akahan	Chief of Army Staff (1967–68)
Col. Illiya Bisalla	Commissioner of Defence (1975–76)
Olusegun Obasanjo	Chief of Staff, Supreme Headquarters (1975-1976), Head of State (1976-79)
Theophilus Danjuma	Chief of Army Staff (1975–79)
Ipoola Alani Akinrinade	Chief of Army Staff (1979-1980)
George T. Kurubo	Chief of the Air Staff (1966–67)
Col. Shittu Alao	Chief of the Air Staff (1967–69)
Emmanuel E Ikwue	Chief of the Air Staff (1969–1975)
John Nmadu Yisa-Doko	Chief of the Air Staff (1975–1980)
Alhaji Kam Salem	Inspector-General of the Police (1966-1975)
Muhammadu Dikko Yusufu	Inspector-General of the Police (1975-1979)
David Ejoor	Military Governor of Mid-Western Region (1966-1971), Chief of Army Staff (1971-1975)
C. Odumegwu Ojukwu	Military Governor of Eastern Region
Adekunle Fajuyi	Military Governor of Western Region

The Military Governors of the twelve states of the federation were ex-officio members of the committee.

== Sources ==
- The Europa World Year Book 1970
