= Hasan Abubakar =

22nd Chief of the Air Staff (Nigeria)

Air Marshal Hasan Abubakar
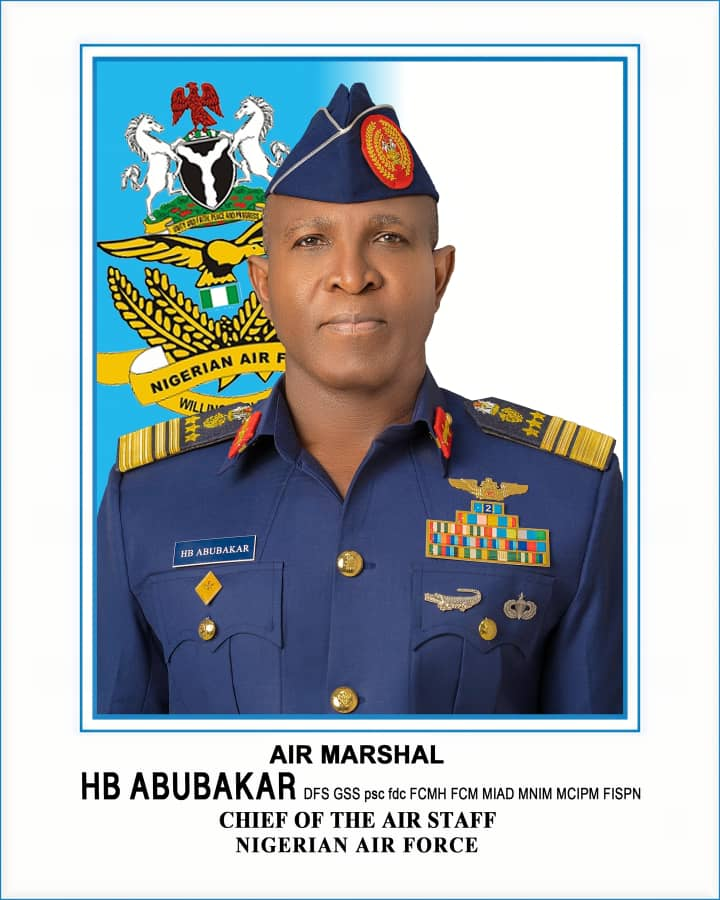
- Official portrait, 2023

Chief of the Air Staff
- In office 22 June 2023 – 30 October 2025
- President: Bola Tinubu
- Preceded by: Air Marshal Isiaka Oladayo Amao
- Succeeded by: Air Marshal Sunday Aneke

Personal details
- Born: Hasan Bala Abubakar; 11 September 1970 (age 55) Shanono, Kano State, Nigeria
- Education: Nigerian Military School; Nigerian Defence Academy; Air Force Institute of Technology; Embry-Riddle University of Aeronautics; Ahmadu Bello University; Nasser Military Academy
- Occupation: Pilot; military officer

Military service
- Allegiance: Nigeria
- Branch/service: Nigerian Air Force
- Years of service: 1987–2025
- Rank: Air Marshal

Air Marshal Hasan Bala Abubakar (born 11 September 1970) is a Nigerian air marshal who served as the Chief of the Air Staff of Nigeria from June 2023 to October 2025.

== Early life and education ==
Hasan Bala Abubakar was born on 11 September 1970 in Shanono Local Government Area in Kano State. He attended the Nigerian Military School, Zaria as a member of NMS 82 class. He is a qualified Aeromechanical Engineer, having obtained a Diploma in Aircraft Maintenance Engineering in 2006 from the Nigerian Air Force Technical Training Group (now Air Force Institute of Technology, Kaduna). He also holds a diploma in Aviation Safety Management from the Embry-Riddle University of Aeronautics, Daytona Beach, Florida, in 2022, as well as a Diploma in National Security and Country Resilience from the Galilee Institute, Nahalal, Israel.

Abubakar holds a master's degree in International Affairs and Diplomacy from the Ahmadu Bello University, Zaria in 2004. For his strategic military training, he attended the Nasser Higher Military Academy in Cairo, Egypt from 2015 to 2016.

== Military life and career ==
Prior to his appointment as the 22nd Chief of the Air Staff, Abubakar had a fruitful career within the Nigerian Air Force. He began his military career at the Nigerian Military School, Zaria as a member of NMS 82 from where he proceeded to the Nigerian Defense Academy. He was enlisted into the Nigerian Air Force as a member of the 39 Regular Course of the Nigerian Defence Academy and was commissioned as a Pilot Officer in September 1992.

Abubakar received his Ab-initio and Basic Flying Training Courses at the then 301 Flying Training School, Kaduna, from June 1997 to January 2000. During his flying career, he accumulated over 4,500 flying hours on various aircraft, including the Air Beetle, Dornier -228, C-130 Hercules, and the Boeing 737.

Abubakar also underwent specialized training, including the Basic and Advanced Airborne Courses and the Amphibious Operations Course in March 1997 at the Nigerian Army Infantry Centre and Schools in Jaji and Calabar.

Throughout his career, he held various roles, including serving at the 88 Military Airlift Group, Ikeja, where he held positions such as Operations Officer of the Operational Conversion Unit, Commanding Officer of 21 Wing, and Group Safety Officer, overseeing the effective support of air and land forces during stabilization operations across various theaters of operation.

Additionally, Abubakar served in the United Nations Mission in the Democratic Republic of Congo (MONUC) in 2006 as a Team Leader in Mahagi, Ituri Brigade, and as Aviation Planning Officer at the Air Operations Base in Kinshasa.

Furthermore, Abubakar served as the Commander of the prestigious 011 Presidential Air Fleet from December 2016 to January 2020 and as the Chief of Staff of Mobility Command, Yenagoa, Bayelsa State. He also held roles such as Director of Policy and Director of Operations at the Headquarters Nigerian Air Force, Abuja. His extensive experience in these positions provided him with a deep understanding of developmental imperatives and the strategic directives of NAF operations.

In January 2022, Abubakar was appointed as the Air Officer Commanding Logistics Command, Ikeja, Lagos State, and later as Chief of Standards and Evaluation at Headquarters Nigerian Air Force, an appointment he held until his elevation as the 22nd Chief of the Air Staff in June 2023.

== Personal life ==
Abubakar is married to Rakiya Abubakar, and they have children. In his leisure time, he enjoys flying airplanes and prefers reading, reflecting, and keeping fit.
