= Yisa =

Yisa is a Nigerian and Chinese name that may refer to

Given name

- Yisa Braimoh (born 1942), Nigerian politician
- Yisa Sofoluwe (born 1967), Nigerian football defender
- Yisa Yu (born 1983), Chinese singer

Surname

- John Nmadu Yisa-Doko (1942–2012), Nigerian Air Force Chief of Staff
