= Ibok Ekwe Ibas =

Nigerian admiral and naval chief (born 1960)

Vice Admiral Ibok-Ete Ekwe Ibas CFR psc+ GSS AM ndc MSc
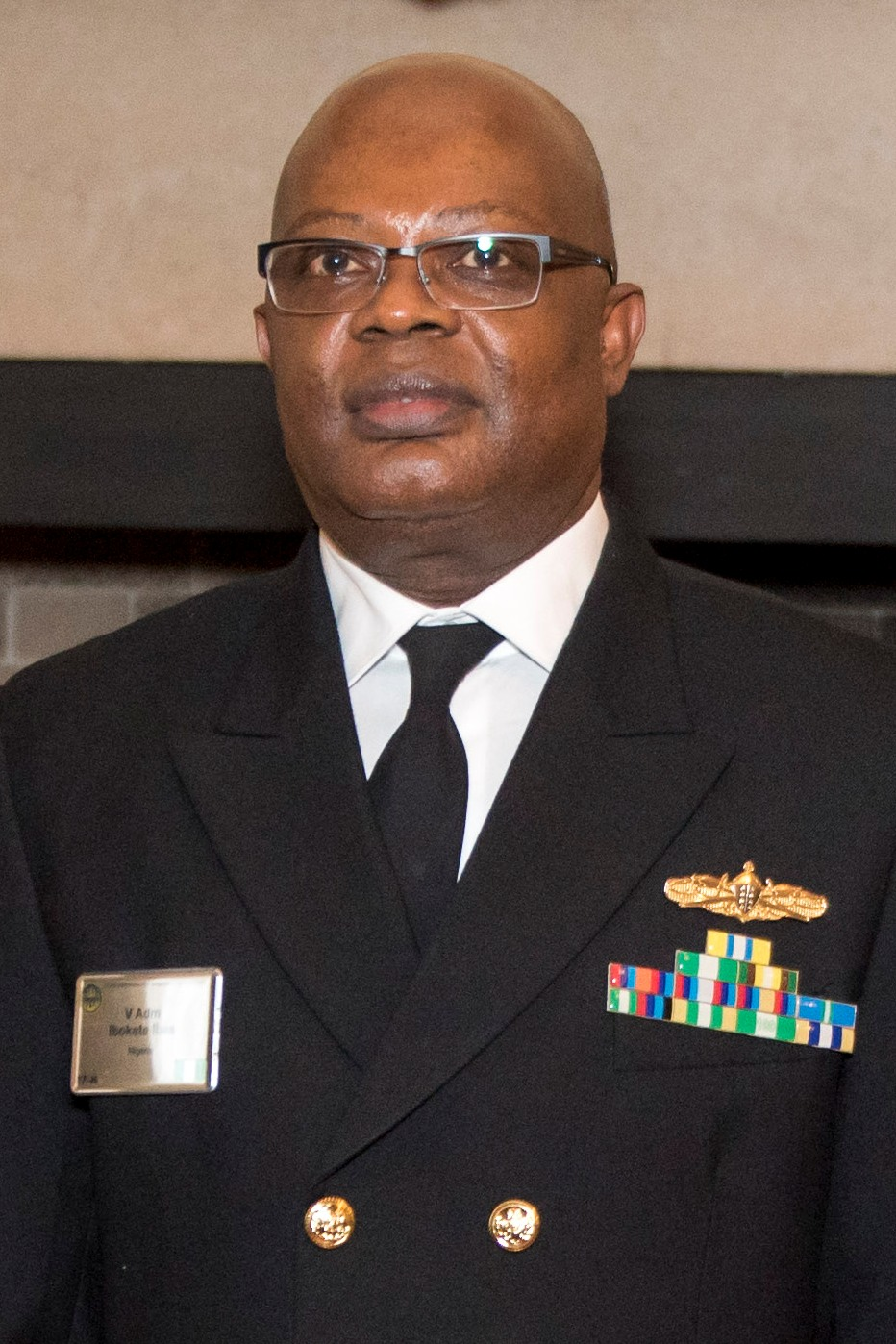

Sole Administrator of Rivers State
- In office 18 March 2025 – 18 September 2025
- Preceded by: Siminalayi Fubara (as governor)
- Succeeded by: Siminalayi Fubara (as governor)

Chief of the Naval Staff
- In office 21 July 2015 – 29 January 2021
- Preceded by: Vice Adm. U. O. Jibrin
- Succeeded by: Vice Adm. A. Z. Gambo

Personal details
- Born: 27 September 1960 (age 65) Nko, Eastern Region, British Nigeria (now in Cross River State, Nigeria)
- Spouse: Theresa Ibas
- Education: Nigerian Defence Academy; INS Venduruthy; Nko Primary School; Big Qua Primary School; 301 Primary Flying Training School; Armed Forces Command and Staff College, Jaji; Marine Corps University; National Defence College, Islamabad, Pakistan; Quaid-i-Azam University; Harvard Kennedy School

Military service
- Allegiance: Nigeria
- Branch/service: Nigerian Navy
- Years of service: 1979 - 2021
- Rank: Vice Admiral
- Unit: Chief of Naval Staff
- Commands: Flag Officer Commanding, Western Naval Command; Chief Staff Officer, Naval Training Command

Ibok-Ete Ekwe Ibas CFR psc+ GSS AM ndc MSc (born 27 September 1960) is a retired Nigerian Navy vice admiral, who was the 22nd Chief of the Naval Staff (CNS) of the Nigerian Navy from 2015 to 2021. He served as the Sole Administrator of Rivers State from March to September 2025, following the suspension of Governor Siminalayi Fubara by President Bola Tinubu after declaring a state of emergency.

== Background and education ==
Ibas was born in Nko, Cross River State, South South Nigeria. He enlisted into the Nigerian Defence Academy as a member of 26 Regular Course on 20 June 1979 and was commissioned sub-lieutenant on 1 January 1983. He began his primary education at Nko Primary School, Nko, in 1966 and completed at Big Qua Primary School, Calabar in 1971. He then proceeded to the Hope Waddell Training Institute, Calabar from 1972 to 1976. Between 1977 and 1979, he attended the School of Basic Studies Ogoja before proceeding to the Nigerian Defence Academy in 1979.

=== Military courses attended and qualifications ===
Ibas has attended several military courses at home and abroad, including the Sub-Lieutenant Technical Course at INS Venduruthy in India from April 1983 to May 1984 and Primary Pilot Training at the 301 Primary Flying Training School at Nigerian Airforce Base in Kaduna from April 1986 to October 1987. He proceeded to the Armed Forces Command and Staff College, Jaji, Kaduna in January 1990 and completed the Junior Staff Course in June of the same year. In July 1992, he reported at the Amphibious Warfare School of the United States Marine Corps University in Quantico, Virginia, US, and graduated with a diploma in amphibious warfare in May 1993. In February 1994, Ibas commenced the Officers' Long Course specializing in underwater warfare at the Underwater Warfare School, NNS Quorra and completed same in February 1995. From August 1996 to July 1997, he returned to the prestigious Armed Forces Command and Staff College Jaji, where he completed the Senior Staff Course with excellent grades. He is also an alumnus of the National Defence College, Islamabad, Pakistan, having attended the National Defence Course from August 2005 to June 2006. In addition he holds a master's degree in defence and strategic studies from Quaid-i-Azam University in Islamabad, Pakistan.

== Career ==
Ibas has held several appointments in the Nigerian Navy. As a midshipman, he served on board NNS Ruwan Yaro, NNS Obuma and NNS Aradu. He later served on board NNS Ayam and NNS Ekpe as a watch keeping officer after he was commissioned sub-lieutenant. He was to later become the executive officer of NNS Siri, NNS Ekun and NNS Ambe between July 1993 and August 1996 as a lieutenant commander. He was the commanding officer of the Nigerian Navy Underwater Warfare School from August 1997 to September 1998 and thereafter, the commanding officer of the Forward Operating Base Ibaka from September 1998 to June 2000. Due to his outstanding performance on the Senior Staff Course, he was appointed as a directing staff at the Armed Forces Command and Staff College, Jaji from June 2000 to June 2002. He later returned to the college in January 2009 as the director of the Department of Maritime Warfare, a position he held until November 2010. His last sojourn in the college was as deputy commandant from January to February 2014.

Ibas was the naval provost marshal from April 2003 to June 2004 and was later the principal staff officer to the then CNS from June 2004 to July 2005. He was the command operations officer at the Headquarters Western Naval Command, Lagos, from June to December 2006, and from December 2006 to January 2009, he was the commander of the Naval Air Base, Ojo. The senior officer was later appointed chief staff officer at Headquarters, Naval Training Command, Lagos, from September 2010 to March 2011. In recognition of his versatility in staff duties and administration, the senior officer was appointed to the Naval Headquarters first, as the chief of administration from March 2011 to February 2012 and later as the Navy Secretary from February 2012 to January 2013. Thereafter, he became the flag officer commanding Western Naval Command from January 2013 to January 2014. He was appointed chief of logistics in February 2014 and then the GMD/CEO of Nigerian Navy Holdings Limited in December of the same year. This was the appointment he held until he was appointed the 22nd chief of the Naval Staff on 13 July 2015.

=== Diplomatic service ===
In July 2021, Ibas was appointed Nigeria's High Commissioner to Ghana, succeeding Olufemi Michael Abikoye. During his tenure (2021–2023), he:

- Facilitated the Nigeria-Ghana Business Council to strengthen economic ties
- Coordinated anti-piracy operations in the Gulf of Guinea with Ghana's navy
- Established a Nigerian Citizens Assistance Desk in Accra to support diaspora welfare

== Administrator of Rivers State ==
On 18 March 2025, President Bola Tinubu in an official broadcast declared a state of emergency in Rivers State, suspending the incumbent Governor Siminalayi Fubara, his deputy Ngozi Odu, and members of the state's house of assembly.

By this declaration, the Governor of Rivers State, Mr Siminalayi Fubara, his deputy, Mrs Ngozi Odu and all elected members of the House of Assembly of Rivers State are hereby suspended for an initial period of six months.

Following the announcement, the President pronounced his nomination of the retired Vice Admiral as the Interim Administrator of the state's affairs:

In the meantime, I hereby nominate Vice Admiral Ibokette Ibas (Rtd) as Administrator to take charge of the affairs of the state in the interest of the good people of Rivers State. For the avoidance of doubt, this declaration does not affect the judicial arm of Rivers State, which shall continue to function in accordance with their constitutional mandate.

The Administrator will not make any new laws. He will, however, be free to formulate regulations as may be found necessary to do his job, but such regulations will need to be considered and approved by the Federal Executive Council and promulgated by the President for the state.

== Awards and decorations ==
In the course of a distinguished service in the Nigerian Navy, Ibas has earned several prestigious awards, including the Silver Jubilee Medal, ECOMOG Medal, Forces Service Star, Meritorious Service Star, Distinguished Service Star and the General Service Star. Others are the Passed Staff Course (DAGGER) and a Fellow of the NDC.

In October 2022, a Nigerian National Honour of Commander of the Order of the Federal Republic (CFR) was conferred on him by President Muhammadu Buhari.

== Professional affiliations ==
Ibas holds the membership of several reputable professional organizations, such as the Nigerian Institute of International Affairs (NIIA) and the Nigerian Institute of Management. Ibas has also attended some seminars and exhibitions at home and abroad. He attended the 25th International Homeland Security Exhibition and the 3rd International Exhibition for Operational Units in Tel Aviv, Israel, in June 2011. In August 2012, he also attended the London International Leadership Course in London, England. He was in United States of America in January 2013 for a capacity development course at Harvard Kennedy School, thus making him an alumnus of the Harvard Kennedy School in the US. He was at Naval Dockyard, Lagos in February 2013 to attend a naval engineering and logistics seminar.

== Personal life ==
He is married to Theresa Ibas and they are blessed with 3 children.

=== Hobbies ===
Ibas enjoys reading, watching documentaries and playing golf.

== See also ==
- Nigerian Navy
