= Air Force Institute of Technology (Nigeria) =

Educational establishment

- Former names: Technical and Supply School; NAF Technical Training Group
- Motto: "Quest for Excellence"
- Type: Public
- Established: 1977 as TSS, renamed AFIT in 2008, and university status in 2018 as Nigeria Airforce university
- Affiliations: Cranfield University
- Provost: Mohammed Dauda
- Head: Abdul Ganiyu Olabisi
- Location: Nigerian Air Force Base, Kawo, Kaduna, Kaduna State, Nigeria
- Website: afit.edu.ng

The Air Force Institute of Technology (AFIT) also known as the Nigeria Air Force University is a military school approved by the National Universities Commission to run undergraduate and postgraduate courses in 2018/2019. It supports the Nigerian Air Force (NAF) and civilian communities by provision of basic training on Aeronautics, aerospace engineering mechatronics engineering and avionics. It is located in Kaduna state, Northern side of Nigeria.

== Overview ==
Following the outbreak of the Nigerian civil war, variety of aircraft types and associated weapon systems resulted in a skilled manpower to operate and maintain them. The NAF at that time depended on foreign assistance for manpower development. However, the training vacancies which friendly overseas countries offered the NAF were limited, inadequate and also required huge foreign exchange financing. Consequently, soon after the civil war in 1970, the Nigerian Airforce mooted the idea of establishing an indigenous Technical and Supply School.

AFIT was founded in 1977 with the name NAF Technical and Supply School (TSS). It was supported by Messrs Dornier of Germany. The institute was renamed in 1979 as Technical Training Wing and was called NAF Technical Training Group (NAF TTG). The group was tasked with the responsibility of providing basic training for NAF personnel in the field of aircraft maintenance, armament and communication. Others are supply management. By the year 2000, its identity was changed to 320 Technical Training Group (320TTG). It was created to manage aircraft and equipment bought during Nigerian Civil War in 1967.

The need to keep pace with technological development through increase in manpower capacity building further led to upgrade of most of the certificates awarded by the institution to a National Diploma, with full accreditation by the National Board for Technical Education, (NBTE). The institute was also affiliated with Cranfield university, UK for post Graduate Studies in Aerospace Vehicle Design and related fields and it became evident and necessary to effect a change in the nomenclature to reflect the expanded role of the institute. AFIT thus came into being on 12 March 2008.

=== Faculties ===
Currently, AFIT comprises 5 faculties, each consisting of various departments. The faculties are: Air Engineering, Computing, Ground and Communication Engineering, Social and Management Sciences and Faculty of Sciences. There is also a School of Postgraduate Studies (SPS). All the basic course curricula are structured to meet the minimum requirements for MSc in the aerospace sector.

The institute has so far graduated over 5,689 persons, including personnel of the Nigerian Army, Nigerian Navy and NAF as well as civilians. It is pertinent to state that this number includes foreign students from the Armed Forces of the Republic of Benin, Zimbabwe, Niger, Ghana and Sierra Leone.

=== AFIT Transformation ===
The Chief of the Air Staff, Air Marshal SB Abubakar through whose vision to "reposition the NAF into a highly professional and disciplined force through capacity building initiatives for effective, efficient and timely employment of air power in response to Nigeria's national security imperatives" has helped AFIT to get the NUC accreditation. AFIT has recently recorded a milestone, as it obtained the status of a university. The school was given approval to begin degree programmes on 3 August 2018. Following this new achievement the school will begin its degree programme by September 2018.

== Structure ==
The following courses are approved under the various faculties and departments:

- Master's programmes
  - M.Sc. Aerospace Vehicle Design
  - M.Sc. Thermal Power
- Postgraduate diploma
  - PGD Aerospace Engineering
  - PGD Electrical and Electronics Engineering
  - PGD Construction Technology
  - PGD Logistics and supply chain Management
- First degree programmes
  - B.Eng. Aerospace Engineering
  - B.Eng. Mechanical Engineering
  - B.Eng. Electrical and Electronics Engineering
  - B.Eng. Information & Communication Technology
  - B.Eng. Automotive Engineering
  - B.Eng. Civil Engineering
  - B.Sc. Accounting
  - B.Sc. Business Administration
  - B.Sc. Economics
  - B.Sc. Marketing
  - B.Sc. Cyber Security
- Recent courses
  - B.Eng Mechatronics Engineering
  - B.Eng Metallurgical and Material engineering
  - B.Eng Telecommunication Engineering
  - B.Sc. Computer Science
  - B.Sc. Chemistry
  - B.Sc. Mathematics
  - B.Sc. Physics
  - B.Sc. Physics with electronics
  - B.Sc. Marketing
  - B.Sc. Statistics
  - B.Sc. International Relation
  - B.Sc. Banking and Finance
