= Alex Badeh =

15th Chief of Defence Staff of Nigeria (1957–2018)

Air Chief Marshal Alex Badeh FSS MSS DSS
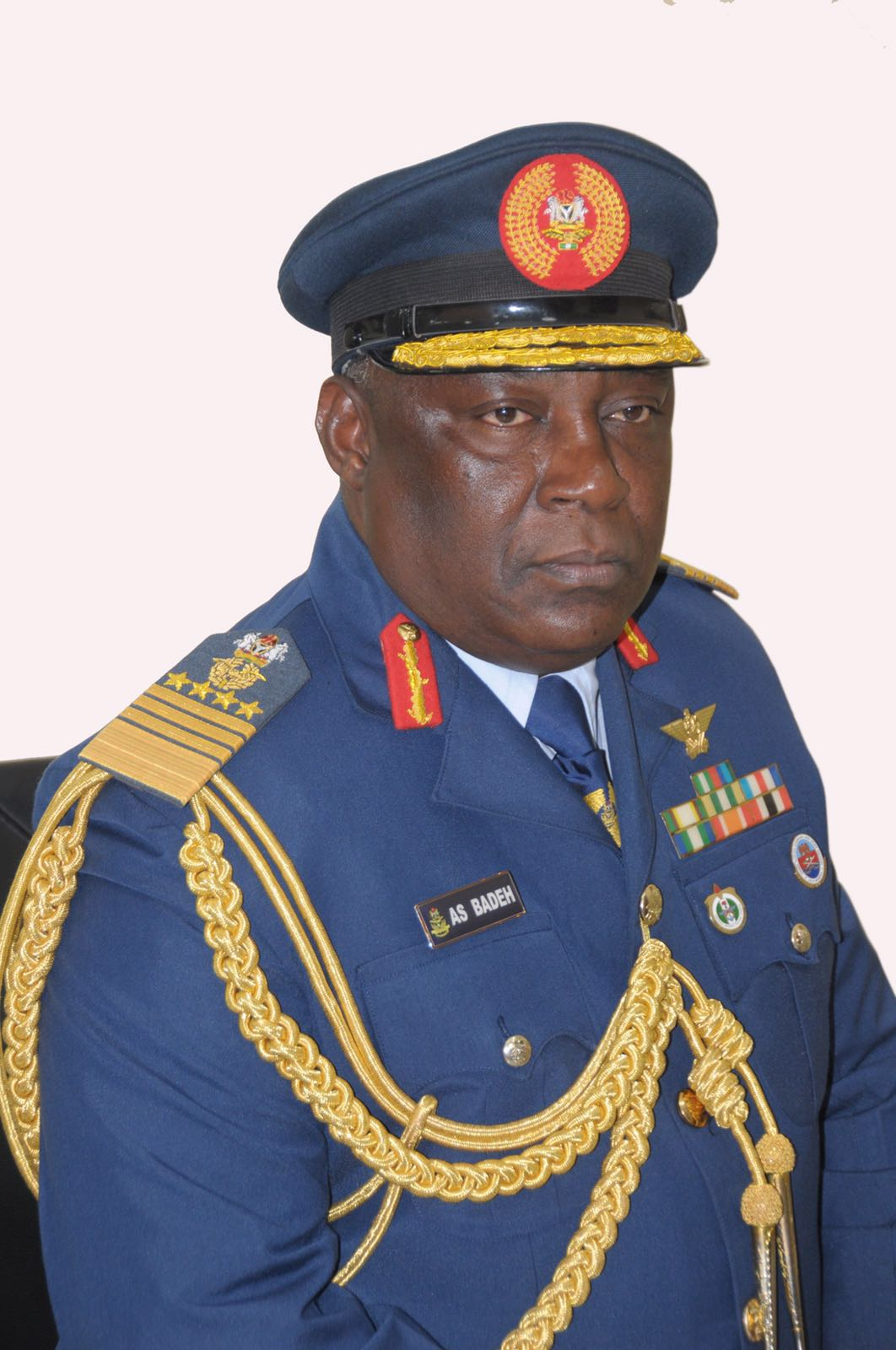

Chief of Defence Staff
- In office 20 January 2014 – 21 July 2015
- Preceded by: Ola Ibrahim
- Succeeded by: Abayomi Olonisakin

Chief of the Air Staff
- In office 4 October 2012 – 20 January 2014
- Preceded by: Mohammed Dikko Umar
- Succeeded by: Adesola Nunayon Amosu

Personal details
- Born: Alex Sabundu Badeh; 7 November 1957 Vimtim, British Cameroon (now in Adamawa State, Nigeria)
- Died: 18 December 2018 (aged 61) Abuja-Keffi Road, Nigeria
- Spouse: Mary Iyah Badeh
- Awards: Forces Service Star; Meritorious Service Star; Distinguished Service Star (Nigeria)Distinguished Service Star; The Republic Medals

Military service
- Allegiance: Nigeria
- Branch/service: Nigerian Air Force
- Years of service: 1977-2015
- Rank: Air Chief Marshal
- Unit: 301 Flying Squad
- Commands: Chief of the Defence Staff; Chief of Air Staff; Chief of Policy and Plans HQ NAF – 2010; Director R&D DHQ Abuja; Commander of Presidential Air Fleet (PAF) – 2002; Director of National Military Strategy NDC – 2006
- Battles/wars: Conflict in the Niger Delta; Islamist insurgency in Nigeria

Alex Sabundu Badeh FSS MSS DSS (7 November 1957 – 18 December 2018) was an officer of the Nigerian Air Force who served as the 18th Chief of Air Staff and the 15th Chief of Defence Staff of Nigeria. He died from gunshot injuries sustained after his vehicle was attacked by unknown gunmen along Abuja-Keffi road on Tuesday, 18 December 2018.

== Early life and education ==
Badeh was born in Muvudi-Vimtim, a little town in the Mubi-North Local Government Area of Adamawa State, North East Nigeria into a family of peasant farmers.

He attended Vimtim Primary School, Vimtim and went on to obtain his school certificate from Villanova Secondary School, Numan in 1976 before proceeding to the Nigerian Defence Academy.

== Military career ==
=== Training ===
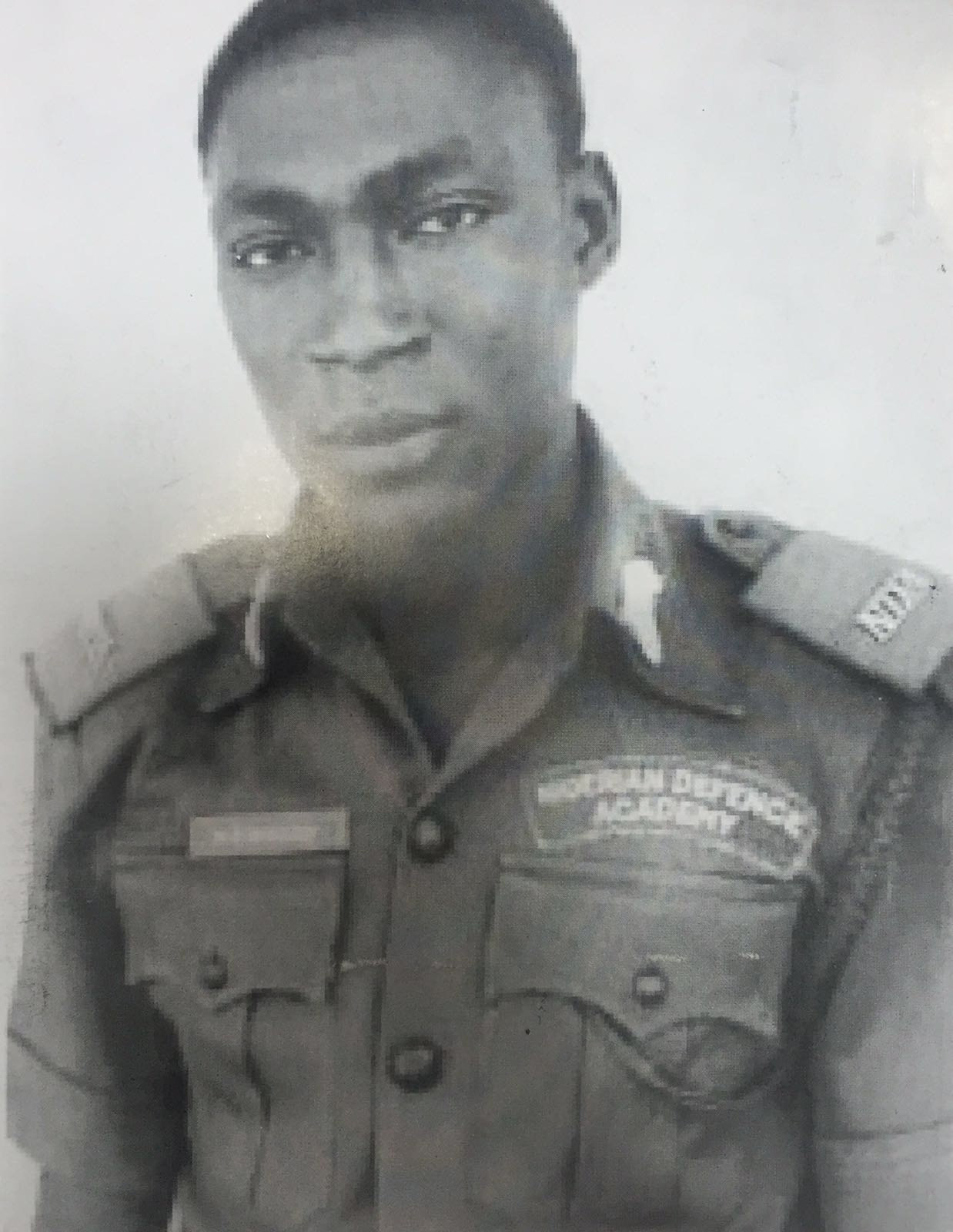
Badeh in the 1970s

Badeh was admitted into the Nigerian Defence Academy as a member of the 21 Regular Course on 3 January 1977, and was commissioned a Pilot Officer on 3 July 1979. He commenced his flying career at the 301 Flying Training School on the Bulldog Primary Trainer aircraft in 1979. Between 1981 and 1982 he attended the Undergraduate Pilot Training at Vance Air Force Base of the United States Air Force. He was at the 301 Flying Training School (FTS) as a squadron pilot and later became an instructor pilot on the Bull Dog and DO-228 aircraft.

He attended the junior staff course at Armed Forces Command and Staff College in 1988. Between 1995 and 1996 he attended the senior staff course at same institution. In 2005 he was at the National War College Nigeria as a member of Course 14 and graduated in August 2006. The Air Marshal Badeh held an M.Sc. degree in Strategic Studies from the University of Ibadan.

Air Marshal Badeh was promoted to Air Vice Marshal on 3 January 2008. Between 2008 and 2009, he was on the Directing Staff at the National Defence College, Abuja, Nigeria and subsequently became the Director National Military Strategy at the same college. Thereafter, he moved to Defence Headquarters as Deputy Director Training and later became the Director of Research at the Defence Headquarters. From October 2010 to March 2012, Air Marshal Badeh moved to Headquarters, Nigerian Air Force as Chief of Policy and Plans. Subsequently, in March 2012, he was appointed Air Officer Commanding Training Command, Kaduna. On 4 October 2012.

He attended Safety International Institute at Teterboro in New York for a course in simulator recurrence, which deepened his knowledge on air safety operations.

=== Commander of Presidential Air Fleet NAF (2002 – 2004) ===
Badeh was Commander of the Presidential Fleet, during the Olusegun Obasanjo presidency. The Presidential Fleet Crew flew around the world frequently and by 2002, Badeh logged over 6000 flying hours shuttling VIPs, dignitaries, top government officials and Heads of State He was given the green light to fly former United States Presidents Bill Clinton and Jimmy Carter on different occasions after an extensive check was done by the United States Secret Service. Badeh's professional dexterity on duty earned him a commendation and an autographed pen from Kofi Annan the then UN Secretary General after flying him on an official trip.

=== Chief of Air Staff (October 2012 – April 2014) ===
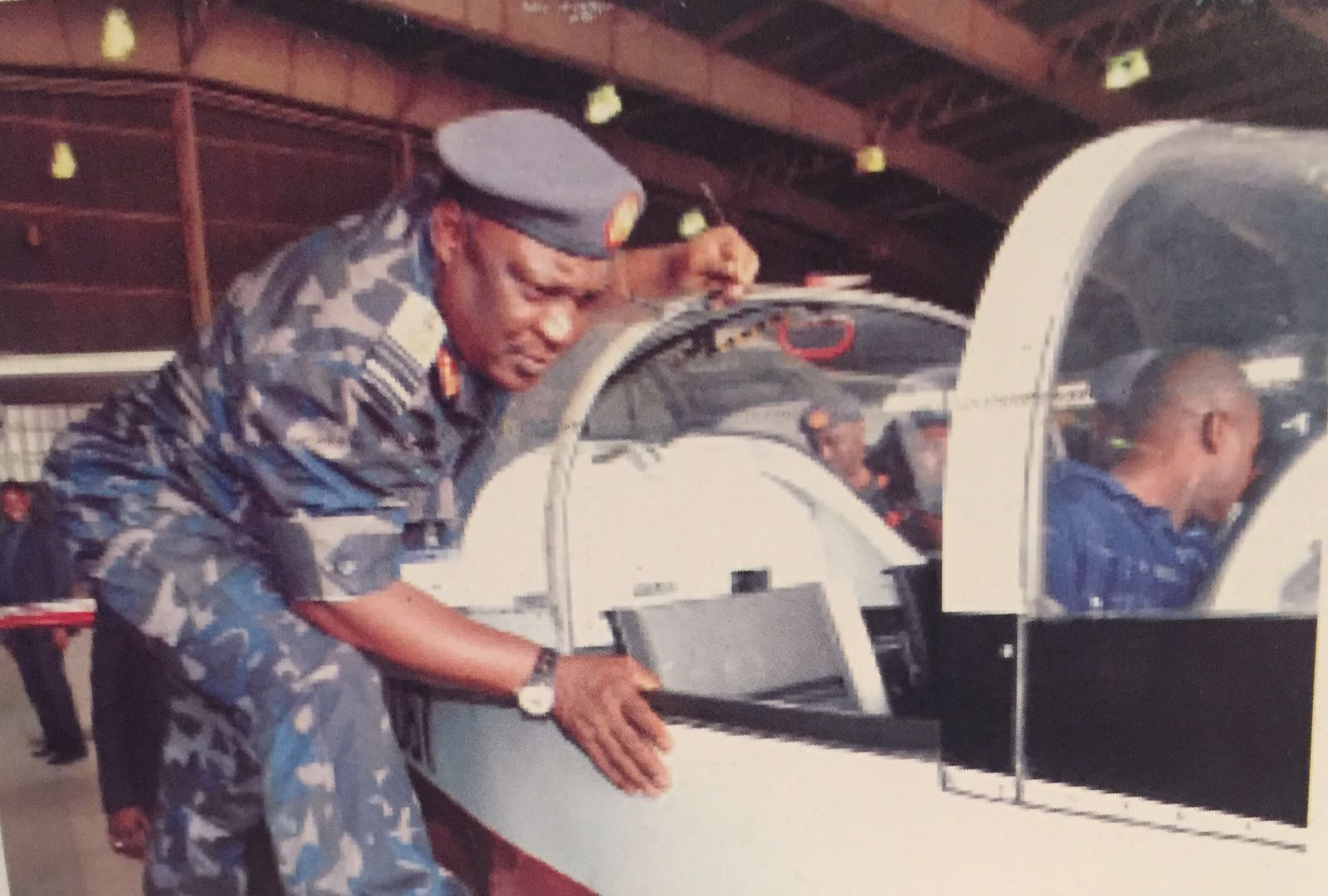
Alex Badeh inspecting NAF aircraft

As Chief of Air Staff Badeh initiated Optimizing Local Engineering (OLE 1 and 2) to focus on developing indigenous Unarmed Aerial Vehicle (UAV) and other weapon systems. The OLE teams consisted of Nigerian Air Force officers with PhDs and master's degrees in various fields of aerospace design, avionic and armament specializations from the Cranfield University in the UK.

OLE 1 and 2 resulted in the production of the AMEBO project (aka GULMA 1 UAV) which allowed the Air Force to survey and carry out attacks remotely without putting the lives of pilots at risk and this was the 1st locally produced drone in Nigeria. Badeh ensured UAV pilots were trained locally to promote local content and save the nation huge resources which would have otherwise have been spent conducting the same training abroad. The Nigerian trained UAV pilots have been resourceful in the ongoing war against terror in the North East of Nigeria.

He encouraged aggressive R & D programs in all NAF units, which led to the first NAF R&D exhibition in Abuja drawing participants from Nigerian universities and research institutes. NAF subsequently signed MOUs with some of the institutions to offer impetus to NAF's R&D efforts. Some of the universities are University of Benin, University of Ibadan, University of Lagos, Covenant University, Ota; Federal University of Technology, Minna; Obafemi Awolowo University, Ile-Ife, Ahmadu Bello University, Zaria and Yaba College of Technology. The research institutes are the National Agency for Science and Engineering Infrastructure, National Space Development Research Agency and the Defence Industries Corporation.

Badeh's sustained research and development programs ushered new methods of tackling maintenance issues one of which is the successful completion of the first in-country Periodic Depot Maintenance (PDM) on the C-130H aircraft NAF913 and similar exercises for on the 2xG-222 aircraft in Lagos. His period as Chief of Air Staff also witnessed the local design and production of the hydraulic diaphragm of the Mi-35P attack helicopter while the EOS camera on board the Agusta 109 LUH helicopter was repaired and successfully re-installed.

While serving as Chief of Air Staff, Badeh initiated and completed some key projects including the NAF hangar in Yola Airport, linking roads from the hangar to the runway, weapons storage facility, crew room for pilots and technicians, accommodation for officers and men, Air Force comprehensive school, Yola, development of infrastructure at 75 Strike Group Yola, air craft shelters, worship centers, 80 room student hostel at the Air Force Institute of Technology Kaduna and other notable projects.

During this period the Air Force launched a partnership with Nigerian Maritime Administration and Safety Agency (NIMASA) to curtail illegal maritime activities by providing aerial security support for the agency and the operation was hugely successful. Badeh also partnered with the Nigerian Emergency Management Agency (NEMA) to supply relief materials, free medical services and even in some cases evacuation missions. As Chief of Air Staff, Badeh ensured all personnel who had kids in the Air Force primary and secondary schools got free tuition.

=== Chief of Defence Staff (April 2014 – July 2015) ===
Badeh initiated and constructed the Defence Headquarters (DHQ) extension complex fitted with a befitting joint operations room, conference hall, the office spaces and penthouse to receive guests. During the military operations against terror in North Eastern Nigeria, there was a need to feed the public with accurate and timely news therefore Badeh established the Armed Forces Radio broadcasting form Mogadishu Cantonment broadcasting on 107.7 FM to tackle the challenge of negative media coverage against the Nigerian Military. The radio station enabled the Nigerian military to tell its side of events, on the subjects of security orientation and information.

Before projects completed by Badeh in his role as Chief of Defence Staff include; the Armed Forces DNA Laboratory, which has allowed for easy identification of casualties of war, the Defence Space Agency, commissioning of 30 Gun Boats in the Niger Delta region, amongst others.

== Personal life ==
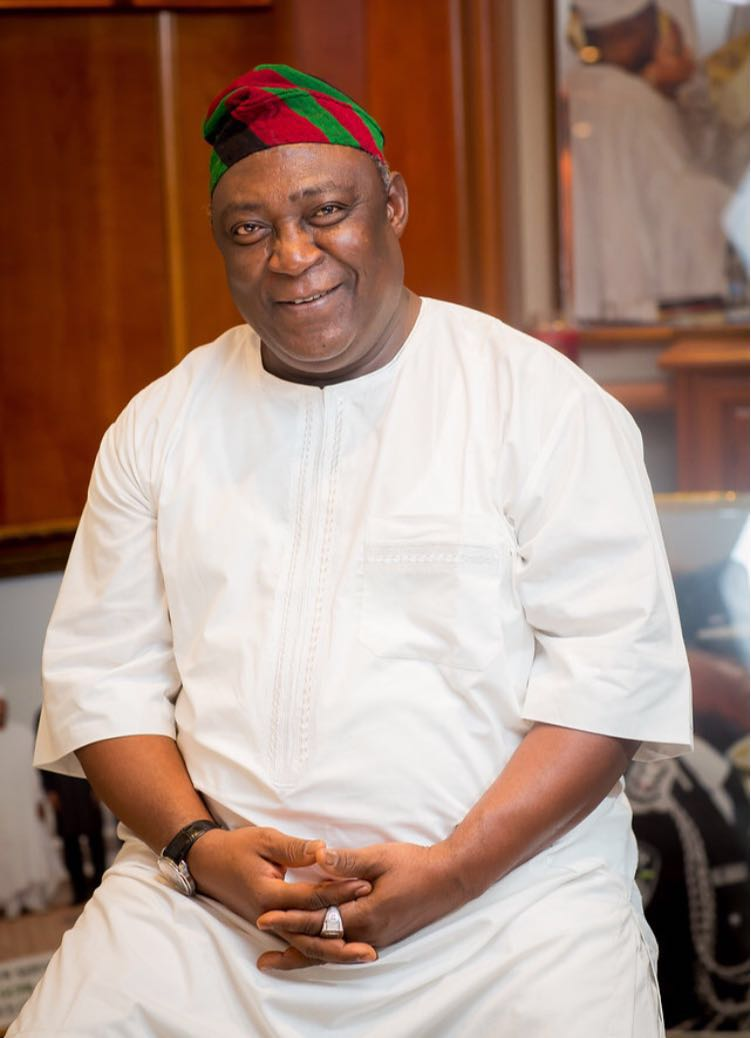

=== Legal issues ===
In February 2016 Badeh was accused of financial misappropriation by the EFCC during his tenure as service chief.

Badeh denied involvement in any misconduct.

=== Terrorist attack in Vimtim ===
In October 2014 Boko Haram fighters briefly occupied Vimtim the hometown of Badeh and in so doing taking lives and destroying properties. His cousin who lived next door to his house was killed during the attack. The terrorists also burnt down Badeh's house and the hospital he built for the community. It was widely reported in the media that the Defence Chief sent a helicopter to evacuate his parents before the attack even though records show that he actually lost his father in the 70's and his mother in 2013.

== Retirement from the Nigerian Air Force ==
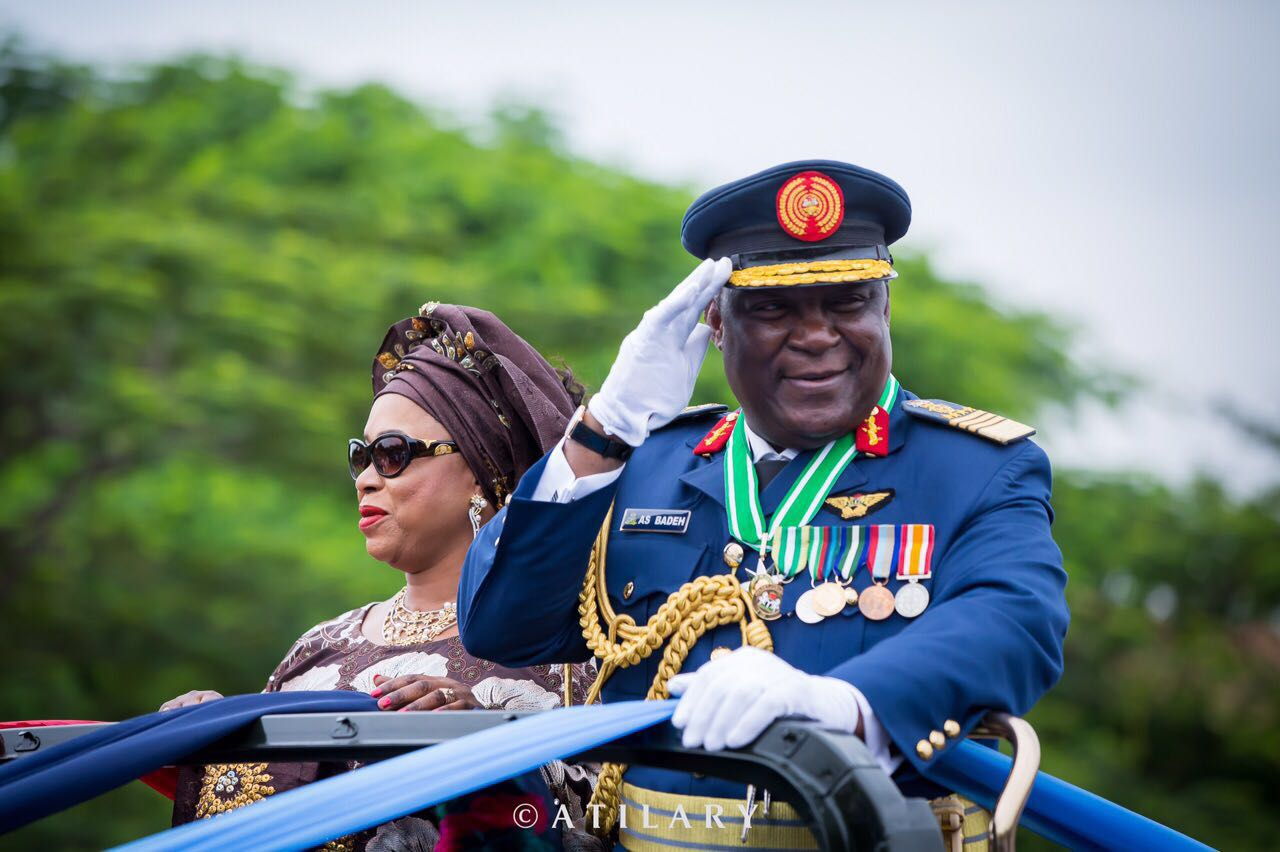
Alex Badeh's pulling out parade

Air Chief Marshal Badeh retired in July 2015. In line with Military tradition a Pulling-Out parade was held at the Mogadishu cantonment Abuja where Air Chief Marshal Badeh gave his valedictory speech before proceeding to his home state.

== Death ==
Badeh was assassinated in an ambush along the Keffi – Abuja expressway on the evening of the 18th of December 2018.

On 23 January 2019, Badeh was laid to rest following his funeral at the Pentecostal Church, Air Force base in Abuja. Among the dignitaries present at his funeral were Secretary to the Government of the Federation, Boss Mustapha, governors of the Plateau and Adamawa State, Simon Bako Lalong and Bindow Jibrilla, and Chief of Defence Staff, General Abayomi Olonisakin.

Military offices
Preceded by Mohammed Dikko Umar	Chief of the Air Staff; 2012 – 2014	Succeeded by Adesola Nunayon Amosu
Preceded by Ola Ibrahim	Chief of the Defence Staff; 2014 – 2015	Succeeded by Maj-Gen. A.G. Olonisakin
