= Ola Ibrahim =

14th Chief of Defence Staff of Nigeria (born 1955)

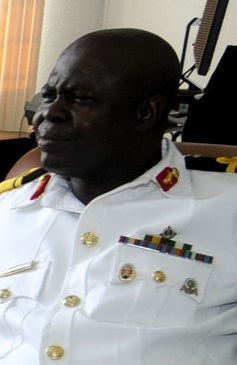

Chief of Defence Staff
- In office 4 October 2012 – 20 January 2014
- Preceded by: Oluseyi Petinrin
- Succeeded by: Alex Sabundu Badeh

Chief of Naval Staff
- In office 8 September 2010 – 4 October 2012
- Preceded by: Ishaya Ibrahim
- Succeeded by: Dele Joseph Ezeoba

Personal details
- Born: Ola Sa'ad Ibrahim; 15 June 1955 (age 71) Ilorin, Northern Region, British Nigeria (now in Kwara State, Nigeria)
- Education: Nigerian Military School, Zaria; Ahmadu Bello University; King's College London

Military service
- Allegiance: Nigeria
- Branch/service: Nigerian Navy
- Rank: Admiral

Ola Sa'ad Ibrahim DSS, psc, rcds, fwc (born 15 June 1955) is a retired Nigerian Navy admiral and former Chief of the Defence Staff of the Nigerian Armed Forces.

Educated at Ahmadu Bello University (LLB) and King's College London (MA, War Studies), Ibrahim had his military training at the Nigerian Defence Academy and the Armed Forces Command and Staff College, Jaji. He served as Chief of the Naval Staff from 2010 to 2012, and as Chief of the Defence Staff from 2012 to 2014.
