= Oluseyi Petinrin =

13th Chief of Defence Staff of Nigeria (born 1955)

Air Chief Marshal Oluseyi Petinrin

Chief of Defence Staff
- In office 8 September 2010 – 4 October 2012
- Preceded by: Paul Dike
- Succeeded by: Ola Ibrahim

Chief of Air Staff
- In office 20 August 2008 – 8 September 2010
- Preceded by: Paul Dike
- Succeeded by: Mohammed Dikko Umar

Personal details
- Born: 19 January 1955 (age 71)

Military service
- Branch/service: Nigerian Air Force
- Rank: Air Chief Marshal

Oluseyi Petinrin (born 19 January 1955) is a retired air chief marshal in the Nigerian Air Force, who was Chief of the Defence Staff of Nigeria from 2010 to 2012. Prior to his appointment as Chief of Defence Staff, he had held the position of Chief of Air Staff.

== Early life ==
Petinrin attended the Federal Government College, Sokoto.

Military offices
Preceded by P Dike	Chief of the Air Staff; 2008 – 2010	Succeeded by M D Umar
Preceded by P Dike	Chief of the Defence Staff; 2010 – 2012	Succeeded by Ola Ibrahim
