= Idi Abbas =

Nigerian naval officer (born 1969)

Vice Admiral Idi Abbas
- Born: 20 September 1969 (age 56); Nassarawa Local Government Area, Kano State, Nigeria
- Allegiance: Nigeria
- Branch: Nigerian Navy
- Service years: 1987–present
- Rank: Vice Admiral
- Commands: Chief of the Naval Staff (2025–present); Flag Officer Commanding, Central Naval Command (2022–2023); Commander Task Group, NN Operation Tsare-Teku (2017); Commanding Officer, Burma Battalion, NDA (2008)
- Awards: Forces Service Star (FSS); Meritorious Service Star (MSS); Distinguished Service Star (DSS); Grand Service Star (GSS); Defence General Staff Medal (DGSM)

Vice Admiral Idi Abbas (born 20 September 1969) is a Nigerian senior Navy officer who is the current and 25th Chief of the Naval Staff (CNS). He was appointed to the position by President Bola Ahmed Tinubu on 24 October 2025, succeeding Vice Admiral Emmanuel Ogalla.

== Early life and education ==
Idi Abbas was born on 20 September 1969, and hails from Nassarawa Local Government Area of Kano State. He attended Air Force Military School, Jos, Plateau (1981–1986).

He was admitted into the Nigerian Defence Academy (NDA) in September 1987 as a member of the 40 Regular Course. He graduated with a Bachelor's degree in Chemistry and was commissioned as a Sub-Lieutenant on 10 September 1993.

Abbas is an Above Water Warfare (AWW) specialist. His academic qualifications include:

- Postgraduate Diploma (PGD) in Management from the University of Calabar.
- Master's in International Affairs and Diplomacy from Ahmadu Bello University, Zaria.
- Master's in Political Economy and Development Studies from the University of Abuja.
- Master's in Strategic Studies from the United States Air War College, Maxwell Air Force Base, Alabama.

== Military career ==
Abbas has held several key command and staff appointments throughout his career, rising to the rank of Rear Admiral on 10 September 2020.

=== Operational and Staff Appointments ===
His key appointments include:

- Watch-Keeping Officer on various Nigerian Navy ships, including NNS ARADU, NNS DAMISA, and NNS AYAM.
- Staff Officer III, Marine Services, at Naval Headquarters (2004).
- Gunnery Officer on NNS OHUE (2006).
- Commanding Officer, Burma Battalion, NDA (2008).
- Naval Contingent Commander of Joint Task Force Operation SAFE HAVEN (2012).
- Maritime Guard Commander (MGC) for the Nigerian Maritime Administration and Safety Agency (NIMASA) (2015).
- Commander Task Group (CTG) of NN Operation Tsare-Teku (2017).
- Flag Officer Commanding (FOC) of the Central Naval Command (CNC), Yenagoa (2022–2023).
- Chief of Naval Safety and Standards (CNASS) at Naval Headquarters (July 2023).
- Chief of Defence Civil-Military Relations (CDCMR) at Defence Headquarters (February 2024).
- Senior Research Fellow at the Nigerian Army Heritage Centre (January 2025).

=== Courses Attended ===
Abbas is a well-trained officer who has attended several military courses at home and abroad, including:

- Sub-Lieutenant Technical Course at NNS QUORRA (1994).
- Junior and Senior Staff Courses at the Armed Forces Command and Staff College, Jaji (2001 and 2005).
- United Nations Military Observer Course in Tanzania (2009).
- National Defence Course (NDC) at the National Defence College, Abuja, Course 23.

== Awards and decorations ==
Rear Admiral Abbas's decorations include:

- Forces Service Star (FSS)
- Meritorious Service Star (MSS)
- Distinguished Service Star (DSS)
- Grand Service Star (GSS)
- Defence General Staff Medal (DGSM)

Military offices
| Preceded by Emmanuel Ogalla | Chief of the Naval Staff; 2025–present | Succeeded by Incumbent |
