= Awwal Zubairu Gambo =

23rd Chief of the Naval Staff (Nigeria)

Vice Admiral Awwal Zubairu Gambo CFR psc AM GSS ensp (RSA) MTM MNIM MUSNI FCIS FIIPS FCAI
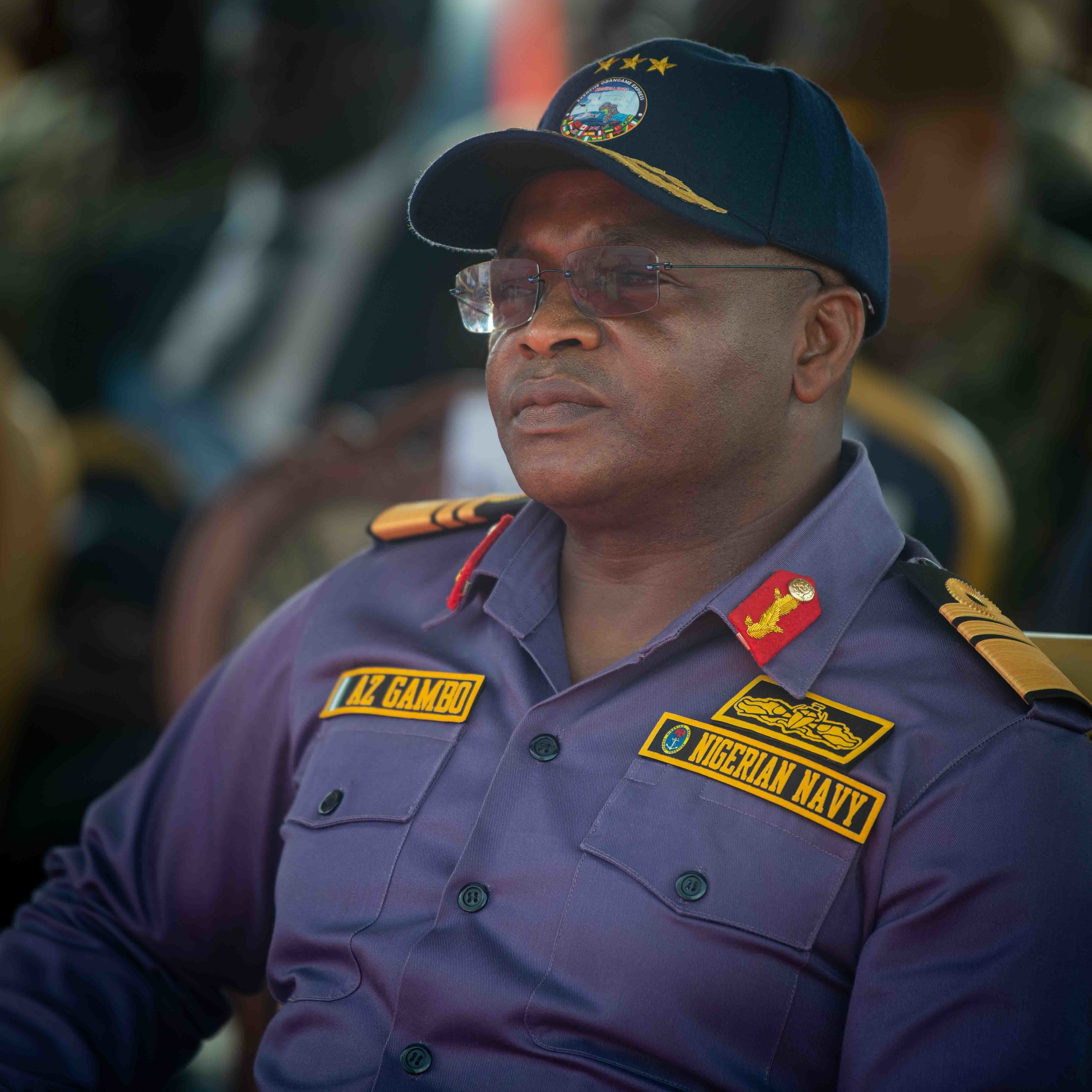
- Official portrait of the 23rd Chief of Naval Staff (Nigerian Navy)

Chief of the Naval Staff
- In office 29 January 2021 – 23 June 2023
- Preceded by: Ibok Ekwe Ibas
- Succeeded by: Emmanuel Ogalla

Personal details
- Born: 22 April 1966 (age 60) Kano State, Nigeria
- Education: Nigerian Defence Academy

Military service
- Allegiance: Nigeria
- Branch/service: Nigerian Navy
- Years of service: 1984–2023
- Rank: Vice Admiral

Awwal Zubairu Gambo CFR psc AM GSS ensp (RSA) MTM MNIM MUSNI FCIS FIIPS FCAI (born 22 April 1966) is a retired Nigerian Navy vice admiral and a former Chief of the Naval Staff of Nigeria, appointed by President Muhammadu Buhari on 26 January 2021.

== Early life ==
Vice Admiral Awwal Zubairu Gambo was born on 22 April 1966 in Nasarawa Local Government Area of Kano State. Vice Admiral Gambo attended Gwagwarwa Special Primary School, Kano where he obtained his First Primary School Leaving Certificate. Thereafter, he proceeded to Rumfa College, Kano where he got his West African School Certificate in 1984.and was a member of Regular Course 36 of the Nigerian Defence Academy.

== Military career ==
He enlisted into the Nigerian Navy on 24 September 1984 as a member of Regular Course 36 and was commissioned Sub-Lieutenant 24 September 1988. He is an Underwater Warfare specialist with a subspecialisation in Intelligence.

Prior his appointment as Chief of Naval Staff, he was Director of Procurement at the Defence Space Administration. He holds a PhD in Transport Management and a Masters Degree in Transport Management (Logistic Option), both from Ladoke Akintola University.

He is a member of the Nigerian Institute of Management, NIM; Fellow of the Certified Institute of Shipping; Fellow of the Institute of Corporate Administration of Nigeria, as well as a fellow of the National Defence College South Africa.

== Awards ==
In October 2022, a Nigerian national honour of Commander of the Order of the Federal Republic (CFR) was conferred on him by President Muhammadu Buhari.
