= Nigerian Independence Medal =

- The ribbon of the medal
- Type: Independence Medal
- Awarded for: service in Nigeria at independence
- Presented by: Nigeria, United Kingdom
- Eligibility: Military, civilian and police personnel
- Established: 30 September 1960

The Nigerian Independence Medal was authorised by Queen Elizabeth II on the occasion of the granting of independence to Nigeria to give recognition to individuals of the Royal Nigerian Military Forces, Royal Nigerian Navy, and the Nigeria Police Force serving on 1 October 1960 and to members of the British Army who were seconded to the Royal Nigerian Military Forces.

== Description ==
- The circular cupro-nickel Nigerian Independence Medal features the crowned effigy of Queen Elizabeth II.
- The reverse of the medal depicts the Nigerian Coat of Arms and the inscription Nigeria Independence, 1st October 1960.
- The ribbon has three vertical stripes, green, white, and green.

== Notable recipients ==
- Emmanuel E Ikwue
- Hassan Katsina
