= Emmanuel E Ikwue =

Nigerian chief of air staff

Brigadier Emmanuel E Ikwue

Chief of Air Staff, Nigerian Air Force
- In office 18 December 1969 – 29 July 1975
- Preceded by: Shittu Alao
- Succeeded by: John Nmadu Yisa-Doko

Personal details
- Born: 6 June 1940 (age 85) Otukpo, Benue State, Nigeria

Military service
- Allegiance: Nigeria
- Branch/service: Nigerian Army; Nigerian Air Force
- Rank: Brigadier

Emmanuel E Ikwue (born 6 June 1940) was Nigerian Air Force's Chief of the Air Staff from 1969 to 1975. Brigadier Ikwue was the fifth Commander of the Nigerian Air Force (NAF), the third indigenous to hold the post. Appointed in December 1969, he was the first to hold the office designated as the Chief of Air Staff, Nigerian Air Force.

== Early life and education ==
Brigadier Ikwue was born on 6 June 1940 in Otukpo, Benue State. He attended the Methodist Central School Otukpo after which he proceeded to the Nigerian Military School from 1954 to 1958. He enlisted into the Nigerian Army and was sent for training as a member of Course 11, Regular Officers Special Training School Teshie, Accra, Ghana (1958 – 1959). Thereafter he attended the Mons Officer Cadet School, Aldershot, and the Royal Military Academy Sandhurst (1959).

== Military career ==
He was commissioned in 1961 and posted to 1st Battalion Enugu. In 1962 he served in a peacekeeping operation in the Congo under the auspices of the United Nations. In 1963, he was appointed Staff Captain (A) to Late Brigadier Maimalari, the then Commander of 2 Brigade NA. It was while serving in this capacity that he was seconded to the NAF. On secondment to the NAF, Ikwue underwent an air force indoctrination and orientation training in Germany between 1963 and 1964. On return from Germany, he was appointed as Senior Air Officer Administration at HQ NAF, Lagos in 1965 with a German as his adviser. It was in this capacity that he established the Service numbering for NAF officers. In 1965, Ikwue was appointed Nigeria's Military Attaché to Germany by Prime Minister Tafawa Balewa. In Germany, he was responsible for all military matters in all the Nigerian Embassies in Europe. In 1968, he was appointed the Doyen, head of Military Attaché Referat (Corps) in Germany. Thus he became the first African and first non-NATO General to head the Corps which had Military Attachés from 35 countries. In 1969, Ikwue was recalled and appointed the fifth commander of the NAF and member of the Supreme Military and Federal Executive Councils. He was the first officer to be officially designated as the Chief of the Air Staff. He held this appointment until his retirement in 1975.

== Awards ==
In recognition of his services to the nation he was awarded the Independence Medal, the Congo Medal and the Long Service and Good Conduct Medals. The NAF on its part, recognised his services with the award of the Distinguished Service Medal and Distinguished Flying Star. Brigadier Ikwue on retirement went into quarrying. He was also at one time the chairman, Nigerian Bank for Commerce and Industry. He was also the chairman, Board of Directors, Ashaka Cement Plc (a subsidiary of LaFarge SA Paris) until 2012. He also acquired a bachelor's degree in theology on retirement.

== Personal life ==
He is currently the chairman of G. Cappa PLC. He is married and has children.
