= Wolfgang Thimmig =

German military officer (1912–1976)

Chief of Air Staff, Nigerian Air Force
- In office 24 November 1965 – 19 January 1966
- Preceded by: Gerhard Kahtz
- Succeeded by: George T Kurubo

Personal details
- Born: 4 October 1912 Dresden, Germany
- Died: 6 November 1976 (aged 64) Stockholm, Sweden
- Profession: Officer
- Nickname: Ameise

Military service
- Allegiance: Nazi Germany; West Germany; Nigeria
- Branch/service: Luftwaffe; German Air Force
- Years of service: 1934–1945, 1956–1976
- Rank: Oberstleutnant (Luftwaffe); Oberst (Bundeswehr)
- Unit: LG 1 ZG 76 NJG 1 NJG 2 NJG 4 NJG 101
- Commands: 2./NJG 1, III./NJG 1, III./NJG 101, NJG 4, NJG 2
- Battles/wars: World War II: Invasion of Poland; Battle of France; Defense of the Reich

Wolfgang Thimmig (4 October 1912 – 6 November 1976) was a German Luftwaffe night fighter during World War II. By the end of the war he had achieved 24 aerial victories, reached the rank of Oberstleutnant, and was Geschwaderkommodore for NJG 2, having previously been the Kommodore for NJG 4.

In 1956, Thimmig joined the newly formed Bundesluftwaffe and was the Military Attache of the Federal Republic of Germany in Sweden between 1959 and 1963. In addition to that, he was the Nigerian Air Force's Chief of the Air Staff from 1965 to 1966. He was the second Commander of the Nigerian Air Force (NAF), and given the task of continuing the creation of an air force for Nigeria under a 1963 agreement between Nigeria and Germany. Thimmig and the German Air Force Assistance Group (GAFAG) withdrew from Nigeria in January 1966, when their mission of creating the air force was completed.

== Summary of career ==
=== Aerial victory claims ===
Foreman, Parry and Mathews, authors of Luftwaffe Night Fighter Claims 1939 – 1945, researched the German Federal Archives and found records for 23 nocturnal victory claims. Matthews and Foreman also published Luftwaffe Aces — Biographies and Victory Claims, listing Thimmig with 23 claims, all of which claimed in Defense of the Reich.

Chronicle of aerial victories
This and the ? (question mark) indicates discrepancies between Luftwaffe Night Fighter Claims 1939 – 1945 and Luftwaffe Aces — Biographies and Victory Claims.
Claim	Date	Time	Type	Location	Serial No./Squadron No.
– 2. Staffel of Nachtjagdgeschwader 1 –
1	18 June 1941	02:41	Whitley	2 km (1.2 mi) north of Best, 10 km (6.2 mi) north-northeast of Eindhoven	
2	11 July 1941	02:40	Wellington	Arendonk	R1184 / BH-B (300 Polish Sqn)
3	16 July 1941? (Note: According to Luftwaffe Aces — Biographies and Victory Claims on 26 July 1941.)	02:31	Wellington	south-southeast of Hamont-Achel	
4	18 July 1941	02:41	Whitley		
5	17 August 1941	01:41	Hampden	Winterswijk? (Note: According to Luftwaffe Aces — Biographies and Victory Claims at Waterwijk.)	
6	17 August 1941	02:30	Whitley	20 km (12 mi) west of Venlo	
7	31 August 194	23:39	Hampden	15 km (9.3 mi) west of Mönchengladbach	
8	31 May 1942	02:06	Halifax	3 km (1.9 mi) northwest of Maarheeze railway station	
– Stab III. Gruppe of Nachtjagdgeschwader 1 –
9	27 August 1942	23:25	Wellington	Epe railway station	
10	27 August 1942	23:54	Halifax	4 km (2.5 mi) south of Haaksbergen	
11	3 February 1943	20:10	Stirling	east of Hengelo	
12	1 May 1943	02:43	Halifax	east of Stadtlohn	
13	1 May 1943	03:20	Lancaster	12 km (7.5 mi) southeast of Zwolle	
14	5 May 1943	00:34	Halifax	south of Gronau	
15	5 May 1943	00:50	Halifax	northwest of Schüttorf	
16	24 May 1943	01:08	Wellington	9 km (5.6 mi) southwest of Enschede	
17	24 May 1943	01:25	Wellington	5 km (3.1 mi) east of Haaksbergen	
18	24 May 1943	01:34	Halifax	12 km (7.5 mi) west of Almelo	
– Stab III. Gruppe of Nachtjagdgeschwader 101 –
19	21 April 1944	23:05	Lancaster	2 km (1.2 mi) west of Kirchheim	
– Stab of Nachtjagdgeschwader 4 –
20	21 April 1944	00:38	four-engined bomber	25 km (16 mi) south of Paris	
21	8 July 1944	02:47	B-26	northwest of Amiens	
22	8 July 1944	02:55	B-26	Senarpont	
23	8 July 1944	02:59	B-26	Baie de la Seine	

=== Awards ===
- Honor Goblet of the Luftwaffe on 28 September 1942 as Hauptmann and Gruppenkommandeur
- German Cross in Gold on 12 July 1944 as Hauptmann in the III./Nachtjagdgeschwader 1

== Notes ==
Military offices
Preceded by Major Rudolf Stoltenhoff	Commander of Nachtjagdgeschwader 4; 20 October 1943 – 14 November 1944	Succeeded by Major Heinz-Wolfgang Schnaufer
Preceded by Major Paul Semrau	Commander of Nachtjagdgeschwader 2; 8 February 1945 – 5 May 1945	Succeeded by —
