= Gerhard Kahtz =

German military officer (born 1922)

Chief of the Air Staff
- In office 5 May 1963 – 11 November 1965
- President: Nnamdi Azikiwe
- Prime Minister: Abubakar Tafawa Balewa
- Preceded by: Position established
- Succeeded by: Wolfgang Thimmig

Personal details
- Born: 26 November 1922 Durlach, Weimar Germany

Military service
- Branch/service: Luftwaffe; Nigerian Air Force
- Years of service: -1965

Colonel Gerhard Kahtz (born 26 November 1922) was a German military officer who served as the Nigerian Air Force's Chief of the Air Staff from 1963 to 1965. He was officially appointed Commander of the Nigerian Air Force (NAF) in 1963, following Nigeria's agreement with Germany to establish its air force.

== Early life and education ==
He was born on 26 November 1922 in Durlach, Germany. Kahtz was a professional architect, before he commissioned as an officer into the Luftwaffe. He served the Luftwaffe as a combat pilot during the Second World War during which he was decorated with the prestigious Iron Cross for his devotion to duty and courage.

== Career in Nigeria ==
Colonel Kahtz arrived Nigeria on 30 May 1963 as head of the German Air Force Assistance Group (GAFAG). He was officially designated as the Commander of the NAF, and assigned to create an Air Force for Nigeria by a 1963 agreement between Nigeria and West Germany.

By the end of his tour of duty on 23 November 1965, a functional NAF existed with an operational base in Kaduna and administrative headquarters in Lagos. He was succeeded by fellow German Wolfgang Thimmig. His administration brought the first set of aircraft into the NAF inventory such as the Allouette helicopter, fixed wing aircraft such as the DO-27, Piaggio and the Nord Atlas. In reflection of his service, he has said, "I am pretty happy and proud of what I did for the NAF in only 2 years”. His command of was characterized by him being a "focused, firm and exemplary leader”.
