= Patrick Koshoni =

Nigerian politician and vice admiral

Vice Admiral Patrick Koshoni

Chief of Naval Staff
- In office October 1986 – January 1990
- Preceded by: Rear Adm. A. Aikhomu
- Succeeded by: Vice Adm. M. Nyako

Federal Minister of Employment, Labour and Productivity
- In office 1985–1986

Federal Minister of Health
- In office December 1983 – August 1985
- Preceded by: D.C Ugwu
- Succeeded by: Olikoye Ransome-Kuti

Personal details
- Born: 17 April 1943 Lagos
- Died: 25 January 2020 (aged 76)
- Education: St Finbarr's College; National Defence Academy

Military service
- Allegiance: Nigeria
- Branch/service: Nigerian Navy
- Years of service: 1962-1990
- Rank: Vice Admiral

Patrick Seubo Koshoni (17 April 1943 – 25 January 2020) was a Nigerian Navy Vice Admiral, former Chief of Naval Staff who had served as minister for Health during administration of General Buhari. During his tenure as health minister, he tried to promote a national insurance program that would provide medical treatment without requiring a down payment.

== Early life and education ==
Born in Lagos on 17 April 1943, but with cultural roots among the Ogu people of Badagry Patrick Koshoni joined the Nigerian Navy on 11 June 1962 after a secondary school education at St Finbarr's College, Akoka Lagos. That same year he started the naval cadetship training at the National Defence Training Academy in India and was commissioned Sub-Lieutenant on 16 July 1964. He was married to Mrs Margaret Aderoju Koshoni with whom he had children and several grandchildren.

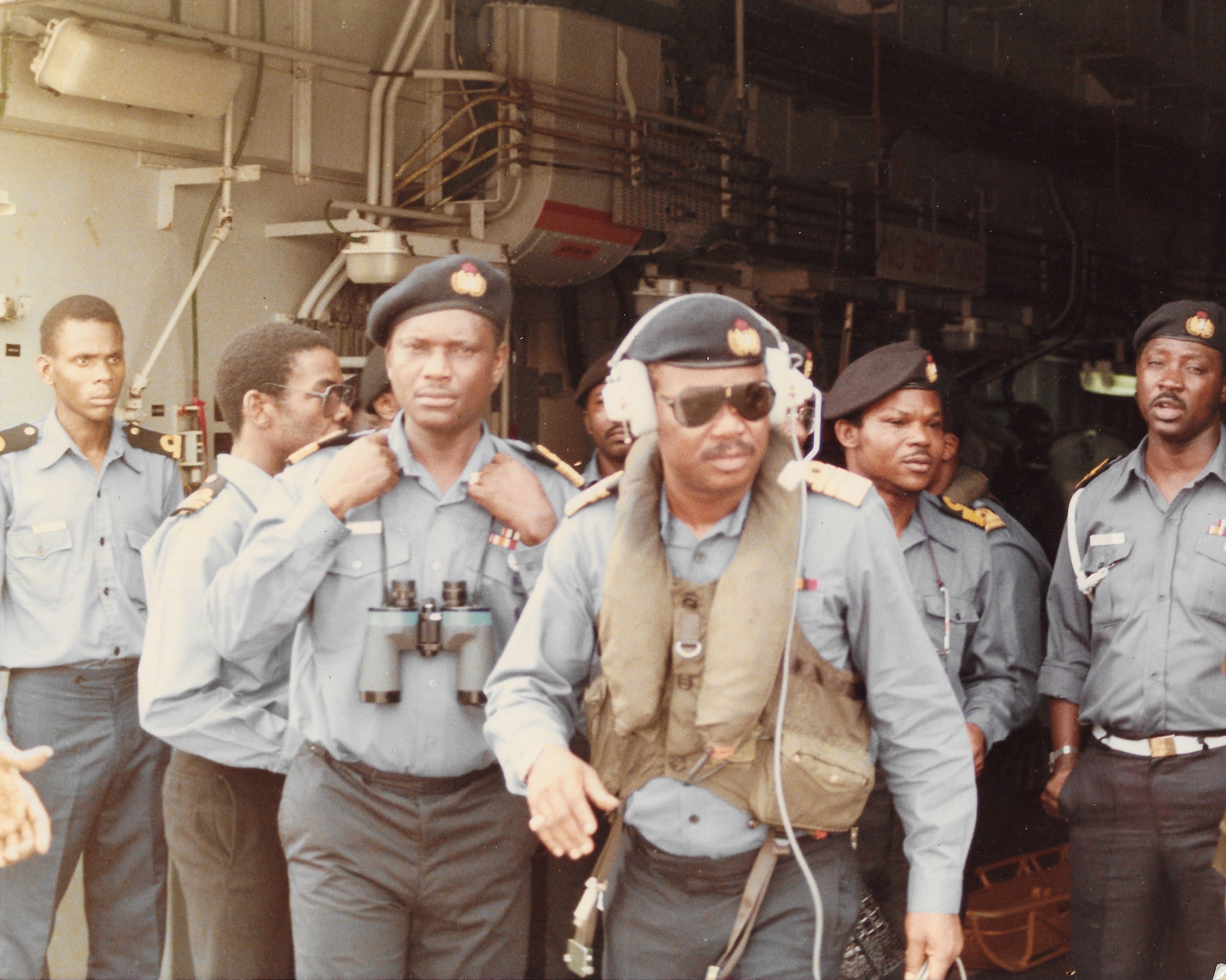
Vice Admiral Patrick Seubo Koshoni during a naval exercise

== Career ==
Admiral Koshoni attended many naval, management and leadership courses and headed many naval and military appointments, committees and task forces. He was a three-time minister in various military regimes, heading the ministries of Health, Transport and Aviation, Employment, Labour and Productivity. He was appointed Chief of the Naval Staff from October 1986 to January 1990, after several years of political appointments.

Vice Admiral Koshoni's tenure as CNS led to the Nigerian Navy Trident Strategy which articulated the Nigeria's maritime strategic imperatives while streamlining the acquisition of platforms for the appropriate size and shape of the NN. Other initiatives under his tenure included Manpower Rationalisation, Training Programmes, Logistic Reform and Morale Boosting Welfare Schemes.

== Death ==
Koshoni died on 25 January 2020, after a brief illness. He was aged 77 and was laid to rest at Ebony Vaults in Ikoyi.
