= Emmanuel Ogalla =

24th Chief of the Naval Staff (Nigeria)

Vice Admiral Emmanuel Ogalla

Chief of the Naval Staff
- In office 23 June 2023 – 30 October 2025
- President: Bola Tinubu
- Preceded by: Awwal Zubairu Gambo
- Succeeded by: Idi Abbas

Personal details
- Born: 20 December 1968 (age 57) Enugu Ezike, East Central State, Nigeria (now in Enugu State)
- Education: Nigerian Military School; Nigerian Defence Academy; University of Ibadan

Military service
- Allegiance: Nigeria
- Branch/service: Nigerian Navy
- Years of service: 1987–2025
- Rank: Vice Admiral

Emmanuel Ikechukwu Ogalla (born 20 December 1968) is a Nigerian Navy vice admiral who was the Chief of the Naval Staff of Nigeria. He was appointed by President Bola Tinubu on 19 June 2023 and served till 30 October 2025.

== Early life and education ==
Emmanuel Ikechukwu Ogalla was born on 20 December 1968 in Enugu State, Southeast Nigeria. He obtained the West African School Certificate from the Nigerian Military School, Zaria in 1987. He obtained BSc in mathematics and an MSc in strategic studies from the University of Ibadan.
