= Adesola Nunayon Amosu =

19th Chief of the Air Staff (Nigeria)

Air Marshal Adesola Nunayon Amosu CFR DSSM DSS fwc psc

Chief of the Air Staff
- In office 20 January 2014 – 21 July 2015
- Preceded by: Alex Sabundu Badeh
- Succeeded by: Sadique Abubakar

Personal details
- Born: 1 August 1958 (age 67) Badagry, British Nigeria (now Lagos State, Nigeria)
- Spouse: Omolara Amosu
- Awards: Distinguished Service Medal (Dss); Defense Superior Service Medal; Fellow War College (fwc) Passed Staff College Dagger (psc+); Commander of The Order of the Federal Republic (CFR)

Military service
- Allegiance: Nigeria
- Branch/service: Nigerian Air Force
- Years of service: 1979–2015
- Rank: Air Marshal
- Commands: Safety Officer at 81 Air Maritime Group Benin as well Wing Chief Operations Officer; Fleet Operations Officer at the 101 Presidential Air Fleet, Abuja; Commandant officer of the 101 Presidential Air Fleet; Air Officer Commanding Tactical Air Command; Director of Operations; Chief of Air Staff
- Battles/wars: Islamic Insurgency War

Adesola Nunayon Amosu CFR DSSM DSS fwc psc (born 1 August 1958) is a retired air marshal of the Nigerian Air Force who served as the 19th Chief of the Air Staff of Nigeria.

== Early life ==
Amosu was born on 1 August 1958 in Badagry, Lagos State, Nigeria. He had his elementary education at Ladilak Primary School in Lagos State before proceeding to the Apostolic Grammar School, where he sat for the West African Senior School Certificate Examination.

Amosu was enlisted into the Nigerian Air Force through the Nigerian Defence Academy as a member of the 25 Regular Course on 3 January 1979 and was commissioned as Pilot officer on 3 July 1981. He later attended the Armed Forces Command and Staff College in Jaji, then the National War College, Nigeria. He also obtained a Master of science, M.Sc degree in strategic studies from the University of Ibadan.

== Air force career ==
He trained as a Pilot officer at 301 Flying Training School Kaduna before he moved to 303 Flying Training School Kano. After his training he was deployed to the 99 Air Combat Training Group Kainji for type-rating on the Alpha-Jet aircraft.

He was promoted to the rank of Air vice-marshal on 3 July 2010. He was decorated by Goodluck Ebele Jonathan, the president of Federal Republic of Nigeria.

He served at different capacity in the Nigerian Air Force before he attained the peak of his career. He served as Safety Officer at 81 Air Maritime Group Benin and later became the Chief Operations Officer as well as Fleet Operations Officer at the 101 Presidential Air Fleet, Abuja. He also served as the Commandant officer of the 101 Presidential Air Fleet. Prior to his appointment on 16 January 2014 as the Chief of Air Staff, CAS he was the Director of Operations and Air Officer Commanding Tactical Air Command.

He is a pilot who has flown the Alpha-Jet, Dornier 228 Gulfstream 5 airplanes, Dornier 128-6 and Falcon 900 with over 6,200 flying hours on many Nigerian Air Force aircraft.

== Arrested By EFCC For Corruption ==
On 27 January 2016, the Nigerian anti-corruption agency the Economic and Financial Crimes Commission arrested and detained Adesola Amosu over allegation of corruption in arms procurement during his tenure as Chief Of Air Staff in which over $2.1 billion arms procurement deal were diverted for personal use.

== See also ==
- Nigerian Air Force
