= Paul Dike =

12th Chief of Defence Staff of Nigeria (born 1950)

Air Chief Marshal Paul Dike CFR FSS MSS DSS fwc

Chief of Defence Staff
- In office 20 August 2008 – 8 September 2010
- Preceded by: Gen. O. A. Azazi
- Succeeded by: ACM Oluseyi Petinrin

Chief of Air Staff
- In office 1 June 2006 – 20 August 2008
- Preceded by: Air Marshal Jonah Wuyep
- Succeeded by: Air Marshal Oluseyi Petinrin

Personal details
- Born: 1950 (age 75–76) Maiduguri, Northern Region, British Nigeria (now in Borno State, Nigeria)
- Education: Nigerian Defence Academy; University of Ibadan; Air command and staff college
- Awards: Force Service Star; Meritorious Service Star; Distinguished Service Star; Fellow of the War College; Commander of the Federal Republic

Military service
- Allegiance: Nigeria
- Branch/service: Nigerian Air Force
- Years of service: 1975 - 2010
- Rank: Air Chief Marshal
- Commands: Chief of Air Staff, Federal Republic of Nigeria; Chief of Defence Staff, Federal Republic of Nigeria; Commander, ECOMOG Air Detachment, Freetown, Sierra Leone; Commander, National Air Defence Corps; Commander, the Nigerian Presidential Air Fleet, PAF; Air Officer Commanding (AOC), Training Command, Kaduna; Air Officer Commanding (AOC), Makurdi, Benue State

Paul Dike CFR FSS MSS DSS fwc (born 1950) is a retired air chief marshal of the Nigerian Air Force, who was the Chief of the Air Staff from 2006 to 2008. In August 2008, he was appointed Chief of the Defence Staff. Prior to his appointment as Chief of the Air Staff, Dike was Air Officer Commanding Tactical Air Command. Appointed Commander of the Presidential Air Fleet in 1997 by military dictator General Sani Abacha, he was appointed Chief of Air Staff by General Olusegun Obasanjo's civilian government in 2006.

== Promotions ==
- Officer Cadet, Nigerian Defence Academy, 22 January 1973.
- Commissioned Pilot Officer, Nigerian Air Force, 21 June 1975.
- Flying Officer, 22 January 1977
- Flight Lieutenant, 22 January 1981
- Squadron Leader, 22 July 1985
- Wing Commander, 22 January 1991
- Group Captain, 22 January 1996
- Air Commodore, 22 January 2001
- Air Vice Marshal, 22 January 2004
- Air Marshal, 30 May 2006 made CAS the same day.
- Air Chief Marshal, 20 August 2008

== Appointments and positions held ==
ACM Paul Dike held the following office prior to becoming Chief of Defence Staffs

- Staff Officer I, Operations Headquarters, Tactical Air Command
- Instructor Pilot, Operational Conversion Unit, MiG-21 fighter jets
- Chief Flying Instructor, 303 Flying Training School, FTS.
- Commander, ECOMOG Air Detachment, Freetown, Sierra Leone
- Directing Staff, Armed Forces Command and Staff College, Jaji, Kaduna.
- Commander, National Air Defence Corps.
- Deputy Director, Plans, Nigerian Air Force Headquarters.
- Director of Operations, Nigerian Air Force Headquarters.
- Commander, Nigerian Air Force Station, Yola, Adamawa State.
- Airport Commandant, Murtala Muhammed International Airport, Lagos.
- Appointed Commander, the Nigerian Presidential Air Fleet, PAF by the late General Sani Abacha
- Air Officer Commanding (AOC), Training Command, Kaduna.
- Air Officer Commanding (AOC), Makurdi, Benue State.
- Appointed the 15th Chief of Air Staff (CAS) on 1 June 2006 by former President Olusegun Obasanjo.
- Appointed the Chief of Defence Staff, Defence Headquarters, Abuja on 20 August 2008 by President Umaru Musa Yar'adua. On 8 September 2010, thereby becoming the First Nigerian Airforce officer to attain the Rank of Air Chief Marshal

Military offices
Preceded by J. D. Wuyep	Chief of the Air Staff; 2006 – 2008	Succeeded by O. Petinrin
Preceded by O. A. Azazi	Chief of the Defence Staff; 2008 – 2010	Succeeded by O. Petinrin
