= Jonah Wuyep =

Nigerian air force officer (born 1948)

Air Marshal Jonah Wuyep

Chief of Air Staff
- In office 23 April 2001 – 1 June 2006
- Preceded by: AM. Isaac Mohammed Alfa
- Succeeded by: AM. Paul Dike

Personal details
- Born: Jonah Domfa Wuyep; 23 November 1948 (age 77) Langtang, Northern Region, British Nigeria (now in Plateau State, Nigeria)

Military service
- Allegiance: Nigeria
- Branch/service: Nigerian Air Force
- Rank: Air Marshal

Jonah Domfa Wuyep (born 23 November 1948) is a former Chief of the Air Staff of the Nigerian Air Force. As an air force pilot, he primarily flew the C-130 Hercules transport aircraft.

== Early life ==
Wuyep was born on 23 November 1948 in Pil-Gani which is in the Langtang area of what was British administered now in Plateau State, Nigeria. He attended the Native Authority Primary School in Shendam from 1959 to 1964 and then the Government Teachers College Toro in north-eastern Nigeria from 1966 to 1969.

== Air force career ==
Wuyep entered the Nigerian military as an officer cadet in 1970 and was commissioned into the Nigerian Air Force in 1973. Wuyep completed his primary flying training in Kaduna Nigeria and gained his wings after training with the United States Air Force at Vance Air Force Base. As a trained pilot, Wuyep flew both jet and transport aircraft although most of his flying career was spent on the C-130 Hercules. This included airlift operations in Eastern and Southern Africa in support of the independence movements in Mozambique, Zimbabwe and Namibia as well as missions in support of the United Nations Peace-Keeping Force in Lebanon. In 1980, Wuyep attended the Junior Command and Staff College in Pakistan and from 1983 to 1984, he undertook the Senior Staff Course at the Armed Forces Command and Staff College, Jaji.

By 1994, Wuyep had been promoted to Group Captain and was appointed the Commander of 301 Flying Training School in Kaduna. He was then successively appointed the Senior Air Staff Officer at Tactical Air Command's headquarters, the Director of Operations and Air Officer Commanding Training Command. From June 2000 to April 2001, Wuyep served as Air Officer Operations.

In April 2001, Wuyep was made Chief of the Air Staff, the senior appointment in the Nigerian Air Force and he was promoted Air Marshal on 1 October 2001. Following the Nigerian Air Force's receipt of a 3 million US dollars aid package in the form of American C-130 spare parts, Wuyep called for a yet closer relationship between the Nigerian Air Force and the United States Air Force. Wuyep acknowledged that development of the oil and gas in the Gulf of Guinea could be mutually beneficial to both Nigeria and the United States. Wuyep also expressing his hope that the former training program for Nigerian aircrew with the US Air Force would be restored. In May 2006, Wuyep was unexpectedly dismissed as Chief of the Air Staff by President Olusegun Obasanjo. Wuyep was succeeded by Air Marshal Paul Dike.

Military offices
Preceded by I M Alfa	Chief of the Air Staff (NAF); 2001 – 2006	Succeeded by P Dike
