= Isiaka Oladayo Amao =

21st Chief of the Air Staff (Nigeria)

Air Marshal Isiaka Oladayo Amao CFR psc DFS GSS RBS GSM QFI fndu MSc MMSc

Chief of the Air Staff
- In office 29 January 2021 – 22 June 2023
- Preceded by: Air Marshal Sadique Abubakar
- Succeeded by: Air Marshal Hassan Abubakar

Personal details
- Born: 14 September 1965 (age 60) Enugu, Eastern Region, Nigeria (now in Enugu State, Nigeria)

Military service
- Allegiance: Nigeria
- Branch/service: Nigerian Air Force
- Years of service: 1984–2023
- Rank: Air Marshal

Isiaka Oladayo Amao CFR psc DFS GSS RBS GSM QFI fndu MSc MMSc (born 14 September 1965) is a retired Nigerian air marshal and a former Chief of the Air Staff of the Nigerian Air Force (NAF) appointed on 26 January 2021 by President Muhammadu Buhari.

== Early life and education ==
Isiaka Oladayo Amao was born and brought up in Enugu State Southeastern Nigeria. He is an indigene of Oshogbo Local Government Area in Osun state. He later moved to Osun state with his parents and then to Kaduna state where he attended his early childhood education at Nuhu Bamalli Primary School in Zaria, Kaduna from 1971 to 1977. He then attended Command Secondary School Kakuri from 1977 – 1982. After he finished his secondary school, he was enlisted into the Nigerian Defence Academy (NDA) as a member of the 35 NDA Regular Course in the Nigerian Air Force cadet on 19 January 1984 and was commissioned as Pilot Officer on 20 December 1986. Amao also attended the Federal College of Freshwater and Fisheries Technology (FCFFT) New Bussa from 1994 – 1996, the University of Madras India from 2002 – 2003, Kaduna Polytechnic from 2005 – 2006 and PLA National Defence University, China from 2012 – 2013.

== Military career ==
Amao held several positions in the Nigerian Air Force and was prior to his appointment was the air component commander of the operation against the Nigerian insurgents that was tagged Zaman Lafiya Dole / Lafiya Dole in North-East Nigeria and was also the air officer commanding Tactical Air Command (TAC). Operationally, as a seasoned fighter instructor pilot on the Alpha Jet, Air Marshal Amao served as a squadron pilot at the 99 (now 407) Air Combat Training Group Kainji and the 75 (now 103) Strike Group Yola. He subsequently worked as an instructor pilot at both the 301 (now 401) Flying Training School Kaduna and the 303 (now 403) Flying Training School Kano, with over 1,500 jet and instructional hours to his credit. He has participated in the draw-down of the Africa-led International Support Mission to Mali (AFISMA), as well as the counter-insurgency Operations Zaman Lafiya and Lafia Dole in the North East of Nigeria. He went on to become air component commander for both operations also serving as deputy theatre commander for the latter. In these roles, he oversaw synergistic employment of Air Power to effectively support land forces in sustaining stabilization operations across the North East Theatre. The air marshal then rose to the position of air officer commanding Tactical Air Command, the lead combat element (often referred to as the "teeth") of the Nigerian Air Force.

Amao was at various times the air assistant to the chief of the Air Staff, assistant director of operations, director of policy, director of training as well as director of operations at Headquarters Nigerian Air Force. He has also served as deputy defence adviser and acting defence adviser at the Nigerian High Commission in London, United Kingdom, chief of training and operations and subsequently chief of policy and plans at Headquarters Nigerian Air Force. Most recently, until his appointment as the twenty-first chief of the Air Staff, Amao was the commandant of the Armed Forces Resettlement Centre, Oshodi, a key institution tasked with the responsibility of training and empowering military personnel for post-service re-integration into the civil society.

He is an alumnus of the Armed Forces Command and Staff College, Jaji as well as the Defence Services Staff College, India. He is a Fellow of the PLA National Defence University. China and holds a Master of Science in defence and strategic studies from the University of Madras India as well as a Master of Military Science and Strategy from the National Defence University China. He is also a certified aircraft accident investigator trained in Karachi, Pakistan and at the Nigerian College of Aviation Technology, Zaria Nigeria as well as being a qualified flying instructing (QFI).

== Personal life ==
Isiaka Amao is married to Elizabeth Olubunmi and since their marriage they have 4 children, 3 boys and a girl. Amao's hobbies include: reading, dancing, travelling, playing volleyball and golf as well as fishing and farming.
