= Usman Oyibe Jibrin =

21st Chief of the Naval Staff (Nigeria)

Vice Admiral Usman Oyibe Jibrin CFR GSS AM psc(+) mni LLB PGCPA
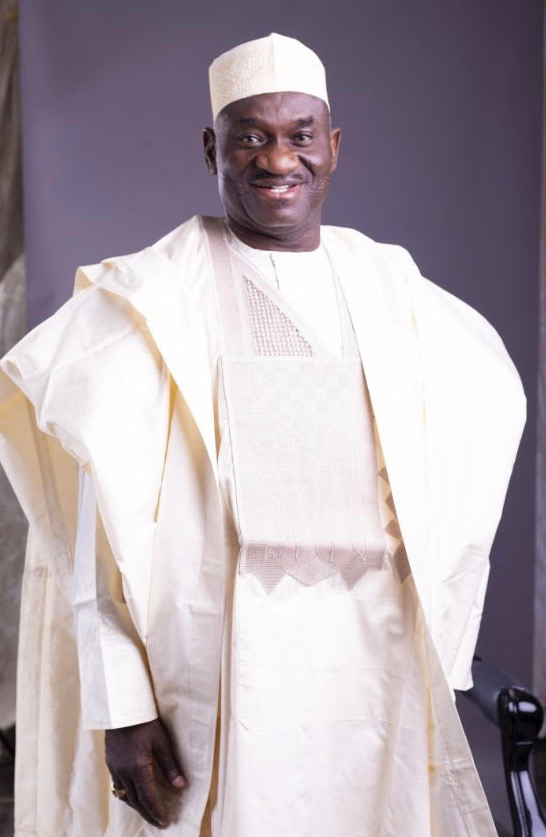

Chief of the Naval Staff
- In office 20 January 2014 – 21 July 2015
- Preceded by: Vice Adm. D.J. Ezeoba
- Succeeded by: Vice Adm. I.E. Ibas

Personal details
- Born: 16 September 1959 (age 66) Okura Olafia, Northern Region, British Nigeria (now in Kogi State, Nigeria)
- Spouse: Lami Ohiama Jibrin
- Awards: Navy Distinguished Service Medal; Defense Superior Service Medal Passed Staff College Dagger (psc+); Command at Sea Badge; Commander of the Order of the Federal Republic (CFR)

Military service
- Allegiance: Nigeria
- Branch/service: Nigerian Navy
- Years of service: January 1982–2015
- Rank: Vice Admiral
- Unit: Chief of Naval Staff
- Commands: Chief of logistics and Director of Training; Commanding Officer of Nigerian Navy Ship OFIOM; Directing Staff at the Armed Forces Command and Staff College Jaji (1994 -1996); Operations Officer Eastern Naval Command; Deputy Director Attaché Management, Defence Intelligence Agency (2001); Commandant, Defence Intelligence School (DIS) Abuja; Flag Officer Commanding, Eastern Naval Command (2010)

Usman Oyibe Jibrin, CFR GSS AM psc(+) mni LLB PGCPA (born 16 September 1959) is a Nigerian Navy vice admiral and the 21st Chief of the Naval Staff. Prior to his appointment as Chief of the Naval Staff, he was the Chief of Logistics and Director of Training, Defence Headquarters Abuja.

== Early life ==
Admiral Jibril was born on 16 September 1959 in Okura Olafia, a town in Dekina Local Government Area of Kogi State, Nigeria.

He attended the Nigerian Defence Academy as a member of the 24th Regular Combatant Course where he graduated as the Best Naval Cadet officer and was commissioned as Sub-lieutenant of the Nigerian Navy on 1 January 1982.

== Naval career ==
He began his naval career as a watch keeping officer on board NNS Damisa and NNS Aradu immediately after he was commissioned as sub lieutenant. He served in this capacity for two years, from January 1982 to January 1984. He later served as base intelligence officer, NNS Umalokun for approximately three years, from July 1984 to 1987.

He also served as a flag lieutenant to the Chief of Defence Intelligence Agency and to the commandant officer of the Nigerian Navy Intelligence School, Apapa, Lagos State, Nigeria, before he became an instructor at Navigation and Direction School, Nigerian Navy Ship Quorra. He served in that capacity for two years, from 1989 to 1991.

In 1994, he was appointed as a directing staff at the Armed Forces Command and Staff College Jaji, a tenure that elapsed in 1996 and after his tenure in 1996, he was appointed as the executive officer, NNS Enyimiri.

In 1997, he became the commanding officer of the Nigerian Navy Ship Ofiom, and in 1998 he commanded the ship NNS Ambe in operation Liberty (ECOMOG), where he obtained the Command at Sea Badge.

In 2001, he became the Deputy Director Attaché Management, Defence Intelligence Agency and the Naval Provost Marshal, Naval Headquarters. In 2002, he was appointed as the defence adviser to the Nigerian Embassy Cameroun. He served in this capacity for four years until the end of his tenure in 2006.

In December 2006, he was appointed as chief staff officer at the Sea Training Command, and later became the commandant officer of the Defence Intelligence School (DIS) Abuja in June 2007. Thereafter, he was appointed as Nigerian Navy secretary and while serving in this capacity, he was promoted to rear admiral.

In 2010, he became the flag officer commanding, Eastern Naval Command, coordinating a joint operation involving the three services around the Gulf of Guinea, NEMO. He also, he coordinated a combined Exercise, called OBANGAME EXPRESS 2012, involving 11 countries including Germany and United Kingdom.

In January 2014, he took over from Vice Admiral Dele Joseph Ezeoba as the Chief of Naval Staff, and on 5 February 2014, he was promoted to the rank of vice admiral by Goodluck Ebele Jonathan, the President of the Federal Republic of Nigeria.

== Awards and decorations ==
He is a recipient of several awards and decorations. Among them are:

- Best Naval Cadet (1982), awarded by the Nigerian Navy
- Passed Staff College Dagger (psc+), awarded by the Nigerian Navy
- Forces Service Star (FSS), awarded by the Nigerian Navy
- Distinguish Service Star (DSS), awarded by the Nigerian Navy
- Meritorious Service Star (MSS), awarded by the Nigerian Navy
- General Service Star (GSS) awarded by the Nigerian Navy
- Command at Sea Badge awarded by the Nigerian Navy
- Admiralty Medal, awarded by the Nigerian Navy

== See also ==
- Nigerian Navy
