= Sunday Aneke =

Nigerian Air Force officer (born 1972)

Air Marshal Sunday Kelvin Aneke

Chief of the Air Staff
- Incumbent
- Assumed office 30 October 2025
- President: Bola Ahmed Tinubu
- Preceded by: Hasan Abubakar

Personal details
- Born: 20 February 1972 (age 54) Makurdi, Benue State, Nigeria
- Education: Nigerian Defence Academy (BSc)
- Alma mater: Ahmadu Bello University; University of Abuja

Military service
- Allegiance: Nigeria
- Branch/service: Nigerian Air Force
- Years of service: 1988–present
- Rank: Air Marshal

Air Marshal Sunday Kelvin Aneke (born 20 February 1972) is a Nigerian Air Force officer who serves as the Chief of the Air Staff. He was appointed to the position by President Bola Ahmed Tinubu in 2025. Aneke is a career officer of the Nigerian Air Force and has previously served in senior command, operational, and staff appointments within the service.

== Early life and education ==
Sunday Kelvin Aneke was born on 20 February 1972 in Makurdi, Benue State, Nigeria. He attended Army Children School, New Cantonment, Kaduna, before proceeding to Government College, Kaduna, where he obtained his secondary education.

He was admitted into the Nigerian Defence Academy in 1988 as a member of the 40th Regular Course and was commissioned into the Nigerian Air Force in 1993. Aneke holds a Bachelor of Science degree in Physics. He later obtained postgraduate qualifications in management, international affairs and diplomacy, and political economy and development studies from Nigerian universities.

== Military career ==
Aneke is a career officer of the Nigerian Air Force and has served in a wide range of command, operational, and staff appointments during his service. His early career included administrative and logistics roles at the Aircraft Overhaul Centre, Aircraft Maintenance Depot, Ikeja, and instructional and logistics appointments at the Flying Training School in Kaduna.

He has participated in several military operations within and outside Nigeria. Between 2004 and 2005, he took part in intelligence, surveillance, and reconnaissance operations in the Niger Delta under Operation Restore Hope. He also served with the United Nations peacekeeping mission in the Democratic Republic of Congo, where he held air operations responsibilities in Kinshasa and the Kindu region.

Aneke later held senior appointments within the Nigerian Air Force, including command and operational roles at the Presidential Air Fleet, Air Training Command, Tactical Air Command, and Nigerian Air Force Headquarters. He served as Director of Safety and Director of Policy at Headquarters Nigerian Air Force, and later as Deputy Commandant of the Nigerian Defence Academy.

Prior to his appointment as Chief of the Air Staff, he served as the Air Officer Commanding, Nigerian Air Force Mobility Command, based in Yenagoa. On 30 October 2025, he was appointed Chief of the Air Staff of Nigeria.
