= Augustus Aikhomu =

De facto vice president of Nigeria from 1986 to 1993

Admiral Augustus Aikhomu

Chief of the General Staff
- In office October 1986 – August 1993
- President: Ibrahim Babangida as Military President of Nigeria
- Preceded by: Ebitu Ukiwe
- Succeeded by: Oladipo Diya

Chief of Naval Staff
- In office January 1984 – October 1986
- Preceded by: Akintunde Aduwo
- Succeeded by: Patrick Koshoni

Personal details
- Born: 20 October 1939
- Died: 17 August 2011 (aged 71)
- Spouse: Rebecca Aikhomu
- Children: 5, including Mark
- Education: Yaba College of Technology; Britannia Royal Naval College; NIPSS

Military service
- Allegiance: Nigeria
- Branch/service: Nigerian Navy
- Years of service: 1958–1993
- Rank: Admiral

Augustus Akhabue Aikhomu (20 October 1939 – 17 August 2011) was an Admiral in the Nigerian Navy, who served as the de facto Vice President of Nigeria under military head of state General Ibrahim Babangida from 1986 to 1993.

== Early life ==
He hailed from Idumebo-Irrua, Edo State, in southern Nigeria. As a student, Aikhomu spent various periods of his early life studying at Irrua Government School, Yaba College of Technology, Royal Britannia Naval College in Dartmouth, England, Long Gunnery Specialist Course, India and the National Institute of Policy and Strategic Studies, Kuru, Nigeria.

== Naval career ==
Aikhomu joined the Nigerian Navy on 1 December 1958. He joined the Royal Navy as an Artificer Apprentice with Series 35 entry at HMS Fisgard near Torpoint, East Cornwall in January 1959. He was in Grenville Division at HMS Fisgard and would have completed his 16 months Part 1 training at the end of April 1960.

Aikhomu was the Commanding Officer, Shore Patrol Craft, commanding officer, NNS Dorina, chief of naval personnel, naval headquarters, chief of naval operations (1983–84), and chief of naval staff (1984–86).

== Vice President and Chief of General Staff ==
Admiral Augustus served as the de facto Vice President of Nigeria under military president General Ibrahim Babangida from 1986 to 1993.

== Later career ==
He was at a time the chairman of the Board of Trustees of All Nigeria Peoples Party, an opposition party in the country. Aikhomu contributed to the Irrua Specialist Hospital specializing in lassa fever management. He died on 17 August 2011, aged 71. Aikhomu is survived by his wife, Rebecca, and five children, Mark, Ehime, Eheje, Vinitha, Suzanne, and Ebi.

== Honours ==
In 1992, a national honour of the Grand Commander of the Order of the Niger was conferred upon him.
