= George T. Kurubo =

Nigerian Air Force officer

Brigadier General George T Kurubo

Chief of Air Staff, Nigerian Air Force
- In office 19 January 1966 – 5 August 1967
- Preceded by: Wolfgang Thimmig
- Succeeded by: Shittu Alao

Personal details
- Born: 27 July 1934 Bonny, Rivers State, Rivers State, Nigeria
- Died: 2000 (aged 65–66)

Military service
- Allegiance: Nigeria
- Branch/service: Nigerian Army; Nigerian Air Force
- Rank: Brigadier General

George Tamunoiyowuna Kurubo (27 July 1934 – 2000) was Nigerian Air Force's Chief of the Air Staff from 1966 to 1967. Brigadier George T Kurubo was the third Commander of the Nigerian Air Force (NAF), the first indigenous to hold the post. He was married, had four children, visited the Government School in Bonny.

== Education ==
From 1948 to 1953, Kurubo attended Government College in Umuahia, then Regular Officers' Training School in Accra in 1953, then Officer Cadets Training School, Eaton Hall, Cheshire in 1954. From 1954 to 1955, he attended Royal Military Academy Sandhurst, then the Young Air Infantry Officers' School in 1956, then Senior Air Infantry Officers' School in 1961, and finally Command and Staff College, Quetta, Pakistan in 1964.

== Career ==
Kurubo was promoted second lieutenant and then platoon commander in 1956. Between 1957 and 1965, he served in various command positions. In 1964, he moved from Lt-Col in the Army to the newly formed Nigerian Air Force in 1964. In January 1966, he became the first indigenous Air Force Chief.

An Easterner, he did not go with the Igbo-led secession because he was from Rivers State which was carved out of the Eastern Region at the outbreak of the Nigerian Civil War. Serving as the Eastern commander of logistics, Kurubo defected from Biafra to the Federal Government.

From January–July 1966, Kurubo served as a member of the Supreme Military Council, and as a member of the Federal Executive Council.

On 12 August 1967, he was appointed Nigeria's Ambassador to the Soviet Union, where he stayed until 1973. In 1970, he was promoted to Brigadier General.

From 28 December 1974 until 1975, Kurubo served as Nigeria's ambassador to Iran, also accredited to Ankara.

On 19 August 1975, Kurubo retired from the military.

== Political career ==
In 1977, he served as chairman of the Bonny Local Government Area's Management Committee. Then, from 1977 to 1978, he was a member of the Constituent Assembly of the Second Nigerian Republic.

Kurubo died in 2000.
