= Dele Joseph Ezeoba =

20th Chief of the Naval Staff (Nigeria)

Vice Admiral Dele Joseph Ezeoba GSS fwc MSc MRIN FCIS
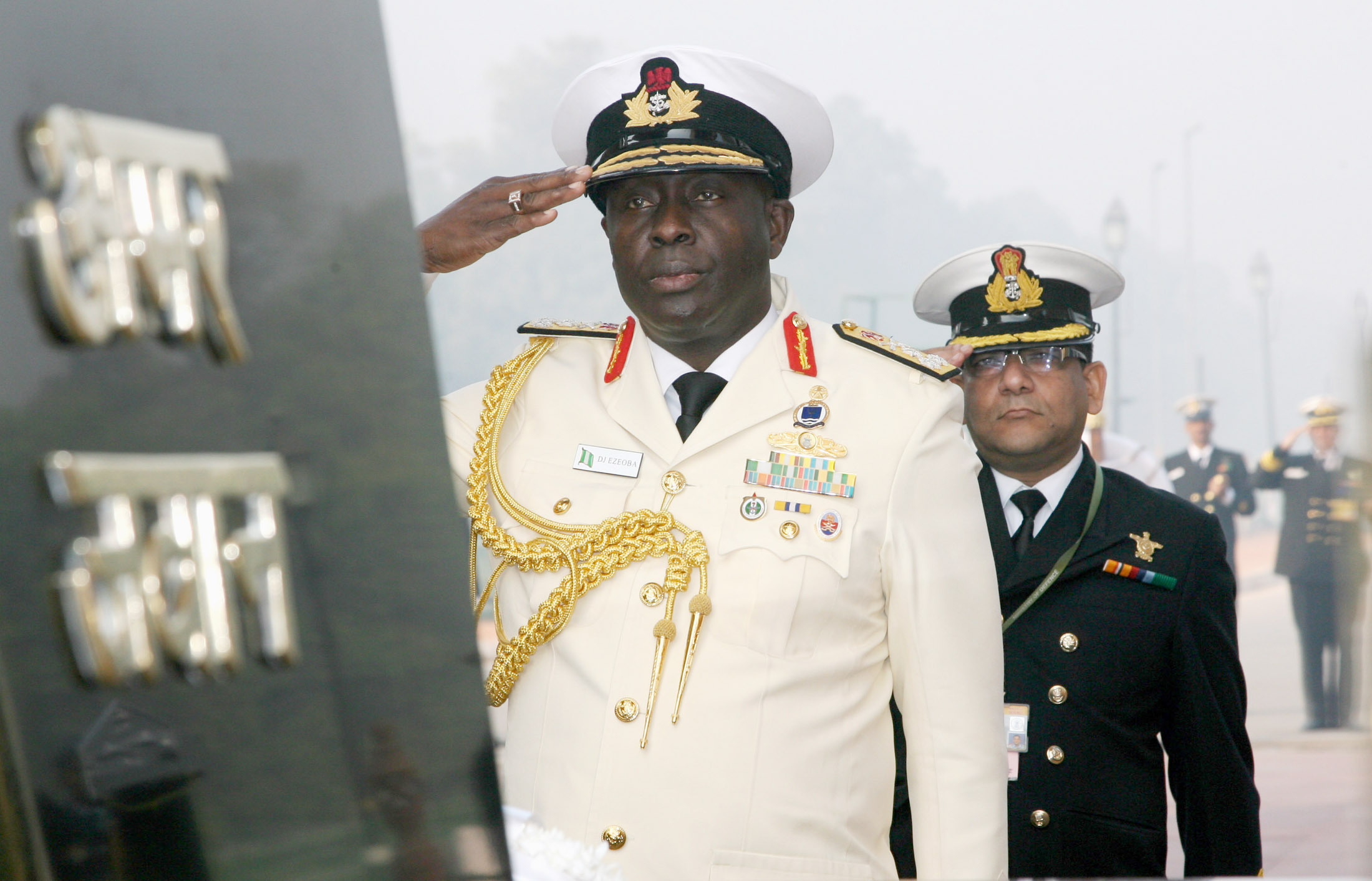

Chief of the Naval Staff
- In office 4 October 2012 – 20 January 2014
- Preceded by: Ola Ibrahim
- Succeeded by: Usman Oyibe Jibrin

Personal details
- Born: 25 July 1958 (age 67) Jos, Northern Region, British Nigeria (now in Plateau State, Nigeria)
- Spouse: Vivian Ifeyinwa Ezeoba
- Awards: Navy Distinguished Service Medal; Defense Superior Service Medal

Military service
- Allegiance: Nigeria
- Branch/service: Nigerian Navy
- Years of service: 1976–January 2014
- Rank: Vice Admiral
- Unit: Chief of Naval Staff
- Commands: Principal Staff Officer Administration, Armed Forces Command and Staff College (AFCSC) (Jaji - Nigeria), Director of Training, Defence Headquarters, Chief of Training and Operations, Naval Headquarters, Chief of Defence Administration Defence Headquarters Abuja; Deputy Commandant AFCSC (Nigeria – Jaji); Operations Officer Eastern Naval Command; Director of Operations Naval Headquarters (NHQ)

Dele Joseph Ezeoba GSS fwc MSc MRIN FCIS (born 25 July 1958) is a retired vice admiral in the Nigerian Navy who was the 20th Chief of the Naval Staff. Prior to that appointment, he served as Deputy Commandant at the Armed Forces Command and Staff College (AFCSC), Jaji, Nigeria.

== Early life ==
Admiral Ezeoba was born on 25 July 1958 in Jos, Plateau State, Nigeria. He attended the Nigerian Defence Academy, Kaduna, before he proceeded to the Britannia Royal Naval College. He later attended the AFCSC as well as the Naval War College, Newport, Rhode Island. He also obtained a Master of science (M. sc) in Strategic Studies from the University of Ibadan.

== Naval career ==
Prior to his appointment as the Nigerian Navy Chief of Naval Staff on 4 October 2012, he was the Deputy Commandant Officer of the AFCSC. He has also held several positions in the Nigerian Navy until he attained the peak of his naval career as the Chief of Naval Staff. He served as the Director of Operations Naval Headquarters (NHQ), Commanding Officer of the Nigerian Navy's premier training institution, Command Operations Officer Eastern Naval Command and member of the Armed Forces Transformation Committee.

== National assignments ==
He took part in the following national assignments:

- Member of the Governing Board of Nigerian Maritime Administration and Safety Agency (NIMASA)
- Chairman of the Nigerian Maritime Administration and Safety Agency (NIMASA) Committee on Combating Piracy and Environmental Pollution in Nigeria Waters
- Chairman of the Presidential Inter-Agency Maritime Security Task Force (IAMSTF) on acts of illegalities in Nigerian waters.
- Chairman of the Ministerial Committee on Problems of Cargo Allocation by National Maritime Authority (NMA).

== See also ==
- Nigerian Navy
