= Ishaya Ibrahim =

18th Chief of Naval Staff (Nigeria)

Vice Admiral Ishaya Ibrahim CFR DSS psc fwc

Chief of Naval Staff
- In office 20 August 2008 – 8 September 2010
- Preceded by: Vice Adm. Ganiyu Adekeye
- Succeeded by: Vice Adm. Ola Sa'ad Ibrahim

Personal details
- Born: 19 September 1952 Jaba, Northern Region, British Nigeria (now in Kaduna State, Nigeria)
- Died: 4 January 2022 (aged 69)

Military service
- Allegiance: Nigeria
- Branch/service: Nigerian Navy
- Rank: Vice Admiral

Ishaya Iko Ibrahim CFR DSS psc fwc (19 September 1952 – 4 January 2022) was the 18th Chief of the Nigerian Naval Staff. He was flag officer commanding Naval training command and Naval western command before his appointment as Chief of Naval Staff in August 2008.

== Background and early life ==
Admiral Ibrahim was born in Jaba local government in Kaduna State. He spent and grew up in Kwoi where he had his primary education. He finished his secondary education in S.I.M Secondary School in Kagoro. He joined the Navy as a member of the 14th regular combatant course.

== Career ==
Rear Admiral I.I. Ishaya served as the Chairman, Board of Directors, National Inland Waterways Authority (NIWA), Lokoja. Admiral Ibrahim served on board several ships, he was the deputy defence attaché in Cotonou, Republic of Benin.

== Personal life ==
Admiral Ibrahim was married to Mrs Grace Ibrahim and they have six children.
