= Akintunde Aduwo =

Nigerian Navy vice admiral (born 1938)

Vice Admiral Akintunde Aduwo

Chief of Naval Staff
- In office April 1980 – December 1983
- Preceded by: Michael Ayinde Adelanwa
- Succeeded by: Augustus Aikhomu

Governor of Western State
- In office July 1975 – August 1975
- Preceded by: Christopher Oluwole Rotimi
- Succeeded by: David Jemibewon

Personal details
- Born: 12 June 1938 (age 87) Ode-Aye, Okitipupa, Ondo State, Nigeria

Military service
- Allegiance: Nigeria
- Branch/service: Nigerian Navy
- Years of service: 1962–1983
- Rank: Vice Admiral

Chief Akintunde Aduwo (born 12 June 1938) is a retired Nigerian Navy Vice Admiral who served as Chief of Naval Staff from 1980 to 1983 and as military governor of the Nigerian Western State from July 1975 to August 1975 during the military regime of General Murtala Muhammed.

== Early years ==
Aduwo was born on 12 June 1938 in Ode-Aye in Okitipupa, Ondo State. He attended Igbobi College, Yaba, Lagos (1952–1956). He worked as a clerk, then as a cadet in the Merchant Marines where he obtained British Merchant Navy Sea Training (1958–1960) and studied at the Liverpool College of Technology, Liverpool, England (1961–1962).

In November 1962, Aduwo transferred to Nigerian Navy as a sub-lieutenant. He was appointed naval officer-in-charge of the Eastern Naval Patrol, then as a lieutenant took command of NNS Aanasa in 1964. His other appointments include first commanding officer of NNS Dorina, first Nigerian director of armament supply and commanding officer of NNS Nigeria. During the Nigerian Civil War, Lt. Commander Aduwo commanded NNS Ogoja. During the sea battle that led to the fall of Bonny in July 1967, he pursued the NNS Ibadan, which had been hijacked to Biafra.

== Senior positions ==
Muritala Muhammed announced Captain Aduwo's appointment as governor in his maiden speech of 30 July 1975. Aduwo was military governor of Western State for just one month, and then was posted to the Nigerian High Commission in India. He was replaced by Colonel David Jemibewon. General Olusegun Obasanjo said Aduwo had been relieved of his appointment as governor to rescue him from the problems of the West, "which had overwhelmed him".

Aduwo attended a course at the Indian National Defence College, and in 1977, was promoted to commodore and appointed flag officer commanding the Nigerian Naval Flotilla. He held the position until his appointment as Chief of the Naval Staff on 15 April 1980, during the administration of President Shehu Shagari. As Chief of Naval Staff, Aduwo renamed NNS Beecroft, the naval base in the Apapa area of Lagos, to NNS Olokun after the ocean goddess, as part of a trend to move from colonial-era names to local Nigerian names.

== Later career ==
After his retirement, Aduwo remained publicly active. He became a leader of the Yoruba Unity Forum and attended several Yoruba Council of Elders meetings. He had served for several years as an elder of the Yoruba people, holding the aristocratic titles of the Oloye Obateru of Aye and the Oloye Taarelase of Ile-Ife. Aduwo was a delegate from Ondo State at the 2005 National Political Reform Conference. He served on the logistics committee of the conference.
