= Chief of the Naval Staff (Nigeria) =

Professional head of the Nigerian Navy

- Badge of the Nigerian Navy
- Incumbent; Vice Admiral Idi Abbas since 30 October 2025
- Nigerian Navy
- Abbreviation: CNS
- Member of: National Security Council; National Defence Council
- Reports to: Chief of Defence Staff
- Appointer: The president
- Formation: 1956 (70 years ago)
- First holder: F.W. Skutil; J.E.A. Wey (indigenous)
- Website: Official website

The chief of the naval staff (CNS) is the military head and highest ranking military officer of the Nigerian Navy. The chief of the naval staff is usually the highest ranking and most senior admiral to serve in the Nigerian Armed Forces unless the chief of defence staff is a naval officer. The position is often occupied by the most senior commissioned officer appointed by the commander-in-chief of the Armed Forces of Nigeria. The chief of the naval staff reports to the chief of defence staff, who also reports to the defence minister. The Statutory duty of the Officer is to formulate and execute policies towards the highest attainment of National Security and operational competence of the Nigerian Navy.

The current chief of the naval staff is Vice Admiral Idi Abbas who was appointed in October 2025 by President Bola Tinubu to succeed Vice Admiral Emmanuel Ogalla.

== Chiefs of the naval staff ==
The table below is a chronological list of officers holding the position of Chief of the Naval Staff (CNS).

No.	Portrait	Chief of the Naval Staff	Took office	Left office	Time in office	Ref.
1	Francis William Skutil	Captain; Francis William Skutil	1956	1958	1–2 years	–
2	Alexander R. Kennedy	Commodore; Alexander R. Kennedy	1958	March 1964	5–6 years	–
3	Joseph Edet Akinwale Wey OFR FSS	Vice Admiral; Joseph Edet Akinwale Wey OFR FSS (1918–1991); Chief of Staff, Supreme Headquarters	March 1964	January 1973	8 years, 10 months	–
4	Nelson Bossman Soroh MFR FSS idc	Rear Admiral; Nelson Bossman Soroh MFR FSS idc (1928–2006)	January 1973	29 July 1975	2 years, 6 months	–
5	Michael Ayinde Adelanwa GCON FSS rcds	Rear Admiral; Michael Ayinde Adelanwa GCON FSS rcds (born 1937)	29 July 1975	15 April 1980	4 years, 261 days	–
6	Akintunde Aduwo CFR FSS FBIM	Vice Admiral; Akintunde Aduwo CFR FSS FBIM (born 1938)	15 April 1980	31 December 1983	3 years, 260 days	–
7	Augustus Akhabue Aikhomu FSS Psc, mni	Rear Admiral; Augustus Akhabue Aikhomu FSS Psc, mni (1939–2011) later Chief of General Staff	January 1984	October 1986	2 years, 9 months	–
8	Patrick Seubo Koshoni FSS Psc, mni	Vice Admiral; Patrick Seubo Koshoni FSS Psc, mni (1943–2020)	October 1986	January 1990	3 years, 3 months	–
9	Murtala Hamman-Yero Nyako FSS Psc, mni	Vice Admiral; Murtala Hamman-Yero Nyako FSS Psc, mni (born 1942/1943)	January 1990	February 1992	2 years	–
10	Dan Preston Omosola FSS , DSO, psc, rcds	Vice Admiral; Dan Preston Omosola FSS , DSO, psc, rcds	February 1992	September 1993	1 year 7 months	–
11	Suleiman Saidu FSS , LSS, MSS, DSS, rcds	Rear Admiral; Suleiman Saidu FSS , LSS, MSS, DSS, rcds (born 1942)	September 1993	November 1993	2 months	–
12	Allison Amaechina Madueke FSS DSS, MRNI, mni	Rear Admiral; Allison Amaechina Madueke FSS DSS, MRNI, mni (born 1944)	November 1993	August 1994	9 months	–
13	Okhai Michael Akhigbe FSS DSS, psc, mni	Rear Admiral; Okhai Michael Akhigbe FSS DSS, psc, mni (1946–2013) later Chief of General Staff	August 1994	9 June 1998	3 years, 10 months	–
14	Jubril Ayinla GCON FSS DSS, psc, Usnwc, fwc	Vice Admiral; Jubril Ayinla GCON FSS DSS, psc, Usnwc, fwc (born 1948)	9 June 1998	29 May 1999	354 days	–
15	Victor Ombu CFR mni	Vice Admiral; Victor Ombu CFR mni (born 1947)	29 May 1999	24 April 2001	1 year, 329 days	–
16	Samuel Olajide Afolayan DSS, psc, fwc	Vice Admiral; Samuel Olajide Afolayan DSS, psc, fwc (born 1948)	24 April 2001	20 July 2005	4 years, 87 days	–
17	Ganiyu Tunde Adegboyega Adekeye DSS, psc, mirss, mni	Vice Admiral; Ganiyu Tunde Adegboyega Adekeye DSS, psc, mirss, mni (born 1952)	20 July 2005	20 August 2008	3 years, 31 days	–
18	Ishaya Iko Ibrahim CFR DSS, psc, fwc	Vice Admiral; Ishaya Iko Ibrahim CFR DSS, psc, fwc (1952–2022)	20 August 2008	8 September 2010	2 years, 19 days	–
19	Ola Sa'ad Ibrahim DSS, psc, rcds, fwc, LLB, (Hons) MA	Vice Admiral; Ola Sa'ad Ibrahim DSS, psc, rcds, fwc, LLB, (Hons) MA (born 1955) later Chief of Defence Staff	8 September 2010	4 October 2012	2 years, 26 days	–
20	Dele Joseph Ezeoba GSS, fwc, Msc, MRIN, FCIS	Vice Admiral; Dele Joseph Ezeoba GSS, fwc, Msc, MRIN, FCIS (born 1958)	4 October 2012	20 January 2014	1 year, 108 days	–
21	Usman Oyibe Jibrin GSS, AM, psc+, mni, LLB, PGCPA	Vice Admiral; Usman Oyibe Jibrin GSS, AM, psc+, mni, LLB, PGCPA (born 1959)	20 January 2014	21 July 2015	1 year, 182 days	–
22	Ibok-Ete Ekwe Ibas	Vice Admiral; Ibok-Ete Ekwe Ibas (born 1960)	21 July 2015	29 January 2021	5 years, 192 days	–
23	Awwal Zubairu Gambo	Vice Admiral; Awwal Zubairu Gambo (born 1966)	29 January 2021	23 June 2023	2 years, 145 days	–
24	Emmanuel Ikechukwu Ogalla	Vice Admiral; Emmanuel Ikechukwu Ogalla (born 1968)	23 June 2023	30 October 2025	2 years, 129 days	–
25	Idi Abbas	Vice Admiral; Idi Abbas (born 1969)	30 October 2025	Incumbent	1 year, 10 days	–
