= Shittu Alao =

Nigerian chief

Colonel Shittu Alao

Chief of Air Staff, Nigerian Air Force
- In office 5 August 1967 – 15 October 1969
- Preceded by: George T Kurubo
- Succeeded by: Emmanuel E Ikwue

Personal details
- Born: 1937 Dorowa babuje, Plateau State, Nigeria
- Died: 15 October 1969 (aged 31–32)

Military service
- Allegiance: Nigeria
- Branch/service: Nigerian Army; Nigerian Air Force
- Rank: Colonel

Shittu Alao (born 1937 – 15 October 1969) was Nigerian Air Force's Chief of the Air Staff from 1967 to 1969. Colonel Shittu was the fourth Commander of the Nigerian Air Force (NAF), the second indigenous officer to hold the post.

== Death ==
He died on 15 October 1969, in an air crash at Uzebba, about 50 miles northwest of Benin. He was aged 32 and he was alone in the plane. Two days later, in Lagos, he was buried with full military honours.

Emmanuel E Ikwue was announced as his replacement on 18 December 1969.
