= John Nmadu Yisa-Doko =

First Nigerian Air Force Chief Of Air Staff

Air Vice-Marshal John Nmadu Yisa-Doko
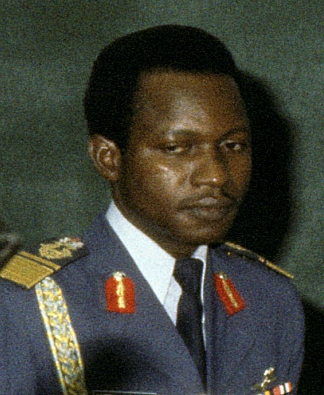
- Air Vice-Marshal John Yisa-Doko in 1979

Chief of Air Staff, Nigerian Air Force
- In office 29 July 1975 – 14 April 1980
- Preceded by: Brig. Emmanuel E Ikwue
- Succeeded by: AVM. Abdullahi Dominic Bello

Personal details
- Born: 13 February 1942 Doko, Niger State, Nigeria
- Died: 2 May 2012 (aged 70) Kaduna, Kaduna State, Nigeria
- Resting place: Doko, Niger State, Nigeria
- Awards: Grand Commander of the Niger (GCON), Commander of the Federal Republic (CFR)
- Nickname: Giwa

Military service
- Allegiance: Nigeria
- Branch/service: Nigerian Air Force
- Years of service: 1962-1980
- Rank: Air Vice-Marshal
- Commands: Nigerian Air Force
- Battles/wars: Nigerian Civil War

John Nmadu Yisa-Doko (born 13 February 1942 – 2 May 2012), GCON, CFR was the first Nigerian Air Force's Chief of the Air Staff from 1975 to 1980 who joined as a NAF cadet.

He was amongst the first batch of pilots recruited to serve in the newly formed Nigerian Air Force, and was sent to Ethiopia for training as a pilot. He was given command over the first air platoon formed, when the German technical assistance team concluded their mission to form the Nigerian Air Force.

Air Vice Marshal John Yisa-Doko was signalled to maturation to the NAF. He was the first officer of NAF origin to become Chief of the Air Staff, and the first to reach the rank of Air Vice Marshal, In Nigeria,

He played an active part during the Nigerian Civil War as Officer Commanding NAF flying wing and senior officer in charge of operations.

== Personal life ==
John Nmadu Yisa-Doko was born to parents Paul Kolo Yisa and Sarah Dufia Yisa in Doko, Niger State, of Nigeria on 13 February 1942.

He belongs to the Nupe tribe, of Nigeria which inhabit the north central part of Nigeria. He was a very keen hunter, composed music and played the piano, played soccer at school, and enjoyed flying in his spare time. He was married with children, and grand children.

He was turbaned the Madakin of Doko, and addressed as "Giwa", a title which made him a senior member of the Doko traditional council.

== Education ==
Air Vice Marshal Yisa-Doko started his education at St. Peter's School, Doko in 1947 before moving to St. John's School, Bida in 1951 where he completed his primary school in 1955. After his primary school, he moved to Government College, Kaduna for his secondary education, graduating in 1961. He then moved on to the Federal Emergency Science School, Lagos in 1962.

== Military career ==
He enrolled into the NAF as a cadet in 1962 and was one of the pioneer officer cadets sent to the Imperial Ethiopian Air Force for pilot training between 1962 and 1964. On return from Ethiopia, he was commissioned as a Second Lieutenant in 1964.

=== Training ===
His other military service training includes:

- Advanced Flying Training (German Air Force), 1965
- Type Rating (5 NAF aircraft types), Kaduna 1965–1970
- Staff College, Royal Air Force, United Kingdom 1969–1970
- Type Rating (Fokker-27), the Netherlands 1974
- United States Industrial College of the Armed Forces 1974

=== Assignments ===
He served in various capacities as his career progressed including the following:

- Officer Commanding NAF Flying Wing, Kaduna 1965–1968,
- Senior Air Officer Operations and Training, HQ NAF (1970)
- Commander, NAF Training Group, Kaduna (1971).
- Commander, Air Transport Group, Ikeja (1972–1974), and
- Senior Air Officer Operations and Training, HQ NAF (1974–1975).

Between 1975 and 1979 Air Vice Marshal Yisa-Doko served as a member of the National Council of States, Supreme Military and National Security Councils.

=== Achievements ===
During his tenure as CAS, he initiated the establishment of primary schools in all major NAF formations, as well as training schools for all NAF primary trade specialties.

He also established the NAF operational bases at Makurdi and Kainji, the NAF Regiment, NAF Junior Command and Staff School and the Air Faculty at the Command and Staff College, Jaji.

He established the NAF Technical Training School Kaduna, to service the technical training needs of the Service.

It was also during his tenure that the current NAF rank structure was introduced. Before retiring, he initiated the proposal for the presentation of Service colours to the NAF.

== Post-military career ==
He held many appointments since his retirement from the Service on 14 April 1980. They include:

- Chairman, Board of Governors National Institute for Policy and Strategic Studies
- Chairman, Board of Directors, Institute for International Affairs, Lagos
- Chairman, Board of Directors, Drake and Scull Limited
- Chairman, Board of Directors, Niger State Tourism Board
- Chairman, Board of Directors, Intercity Bank
- Chairman, Board of Directors, Nigeria Airways

== Awards ==
He was awarded the following by the Federal Government

- Defence Services Medal
- National Service Medal
- Republic Medal
- Grand Commander of the Order of the Niger (GCON)
- Commander of the Federal Republic (CFR), 2011

The NAF on its part has honoured him with the following in recognition of his meritorious service to NAF and the country.

- Distinguished Flying Star
- Distinguished Service Medal

He died 3 of May, 2012, on a brief illness,

Military offices
Preceded by Emmanuel E Ikwue	Chief of Air Staff, Nigerian Air Force; July 1975 - April 1980	Succeeded by Abdullahi Domic Bello
