= Olufemi Michael Abikoye =

Nigerian diplomat

Olufemi Michael Abikoye (born 3 June 1959) is a Nigerian diplomat who served as Nigeria's High Commissioner to Ghana from 2017 to 2020.

== Early life and education ==
Born in Ilorin, Kwara State, Abikoye earned a B.Sc in Chemistry from the University of Ilorin (1984) and later completed diplomatic training at the Foreign Service Academy in Abuja.

== Diplomatic career ==
=== High Commissioner to Ghana (2017–2020) ===
During his tenure, he:

- resolving leadership crises in Nigerian diaspora organizations through the "Abikoye Peace Formula" (2019)
- Mediating the 2019 trade disputes between Nigerian merchants and Ghana Union of Traders Association
- Securing the release of 126 Nigerian prisoners from Ghanaian jails (2018–2020)

=== Later career ===
Post-retirement activities include:

- Board member of First Bank of Nigeria (since 2021)
- Chairman of the Nigeria-Ghana Business Council (2022-present)

== Awards ==
- Officer of the Order of the Niger (OON) - 2021
- Ghana-Nigeria Friendship Award (2019)
