= Chief of the Air Staff (Nigeria) =

Professional head of the Nigerian Air Force

- Nigerian Air Force emblem
- Incumbent; Air Marshal Sunday Aneke since 30 October 2025
- Nigerian Air Force
- Abbreviation: CAS
- Member of: National Security Council; National Defence Council
- Reports to: Chief of the Defence Staff
- Appointer: President of Nigeria
- Formation: 1963 (63 years ago)
- First holder: Gerhard Kahtz

The chief of the air staff (CAS) is the professional head and highest ranking military officer of the Nigerian Air Force. The position is often occupied by the most senior commissioned officer appointed by the commander-in-chief of the Armed Forces of Nigeria. The post was created in 1963 with Colonel Gerhard Kahtz of the German Air Force as the first incumbent.

The current and 23rd chief of the air staff is Air Marshal Sunday Aneke, who succeeded Air Marshal Hassan Abubakar in October 2025.

== List of chiefs ==
The following have served as Chief of the Air Staff:

No.	Portrait	Chief of Air Staff	Took office	Left office	Time in office	Ref.
1	Gerhard Kahtz	Colonel; Gerhard Kahtz (born 1922)	5 May 1963	11 November 1965	2 years, 190 days	–
2	Wolfgang Thimmig	Colonel; Wolfgang Thimmig (1912–1976)	24 November 1965	19 January 1966	56 days	–
3	George T. Kurubo	Lieutenant Colonel; George T. Kurubo (1934–2000)	19 January 1966	5 August 1967	1 year, 198 days	–
4	Shittu Alao	Colonel; Shittu Alao (1937–1969)	5 August 1967	15 October 1969 †	2 years, 71 days	–
5	Emmanuel E Ikwue	Brigadier; Emmanuel E Ikwue (born 1940)	18 December 1969	29 July 1975	5 years, 223 days	–
6	John Nmadu Yisa-Doko	Air Vice-Marshal; John Nmadu Yisa-Doko (1942–2012)	29 July 1975	14 April 1980	4 years, 260 days	–
7	Abdullahi Dominic Bello	Air Vice-Marshal; Abdullahi Dominic Bello (born 1942)	15 April 1980	31 December 1983	3 years, 260 days	–
8	Ibrahim Mahmud Alfa	Air Marshal; Ibrahim Mahmud Alfa (1946–2000)	1 January 1984	1 January 1990	6 years, 0 days	–
9	Nuraini Oladimeji Yussuff	Air Vice-Marshal; Nuraini Oladimeji Yussuff (1942–2006)	1 January 1990	1 February 1992	2 years, 31 days	–
10	Akin Dada	Air Marshal; Akin Dada	1 February 1992	17 September 1992	229 days	–
11	Femi John Femi	Air Vice-Marshal; Femi John Femi (born 1945)	17 September 1992	30 March 1996	3 years, 195 days	–
12	Nsikak-Abasi Essien Eduok	Air Marshal; Nsikak-Abasi Essien Eduok (1947–2021)	30 March 1996	29 May 1999	3 years, 60 days	–
13	Isaac Mohammed Alfa	Air Marshal; Isaac Mohammed Alfa (born 1950)	29 May 1999	24 April 2001	1 year, 330 days	–
14	Jonah Domfa Wuyep	Air Marshal; Jonah Domfa Wuyep (born 1948)	24 April 2001	1 June 2006	5 years, 38 days	–
15	Paul Dike	Air Marshal; Paul Dike (born 1950) later Chief of Defence Staff	1 June 2006	20 August 2008	2 years, 80 days	–
16	Oluseyi Petinrin	Air Marshal; Oluseyi Petinrin (born 1955) later Chief of Defence Staff	20 August 2008	8 September 2010	2 years, 19 days	–
17	Mohammed Dikko Umar	Air Marshal; Mohammed Dikko Umar (born 1955)	8 September 2010	4 October 2012	2 years, 26 days	–
18	Alex Sabundu Badeh	Air Marshal; Alex Sabundu Badeh (1957–2018) later Chief of Defence Staff	4 October 2012	20 January 2014	1 year, 108 days	–
19	Adesola Nunayon Amosu	Air Marshal; Adesola Nunayon Amosu (born 1958)	20 January 2014	21 July 2015	1 year, 182 days	–
20	Sadique Abubakar	Air Marshal; Sadique Abubakar (born 1960)	21 July 2015	29 January 2021	5 years, 192 days	–
21	Isiaka Oladayo Amao	Air Marshal; Isiaka Oladayo Amao (born 1965)	29 January 2021	22 June 2023	2 years, 144 days	
22	Hasan Abubakar	Air Marshal; Hasan Abubakar (born 1970)	22 June 2023	30 October 2025	2 years, 130 days	–
23	Sunday Aneke	Air Marshal; Sunday Aneke (born 1972)	30 October 2025	Incumbent	1 year, 10 days	–
