= Lamidi Adeosun =

Nigerian general (born 1963)

Lieutenant General Lamidi Adeosun
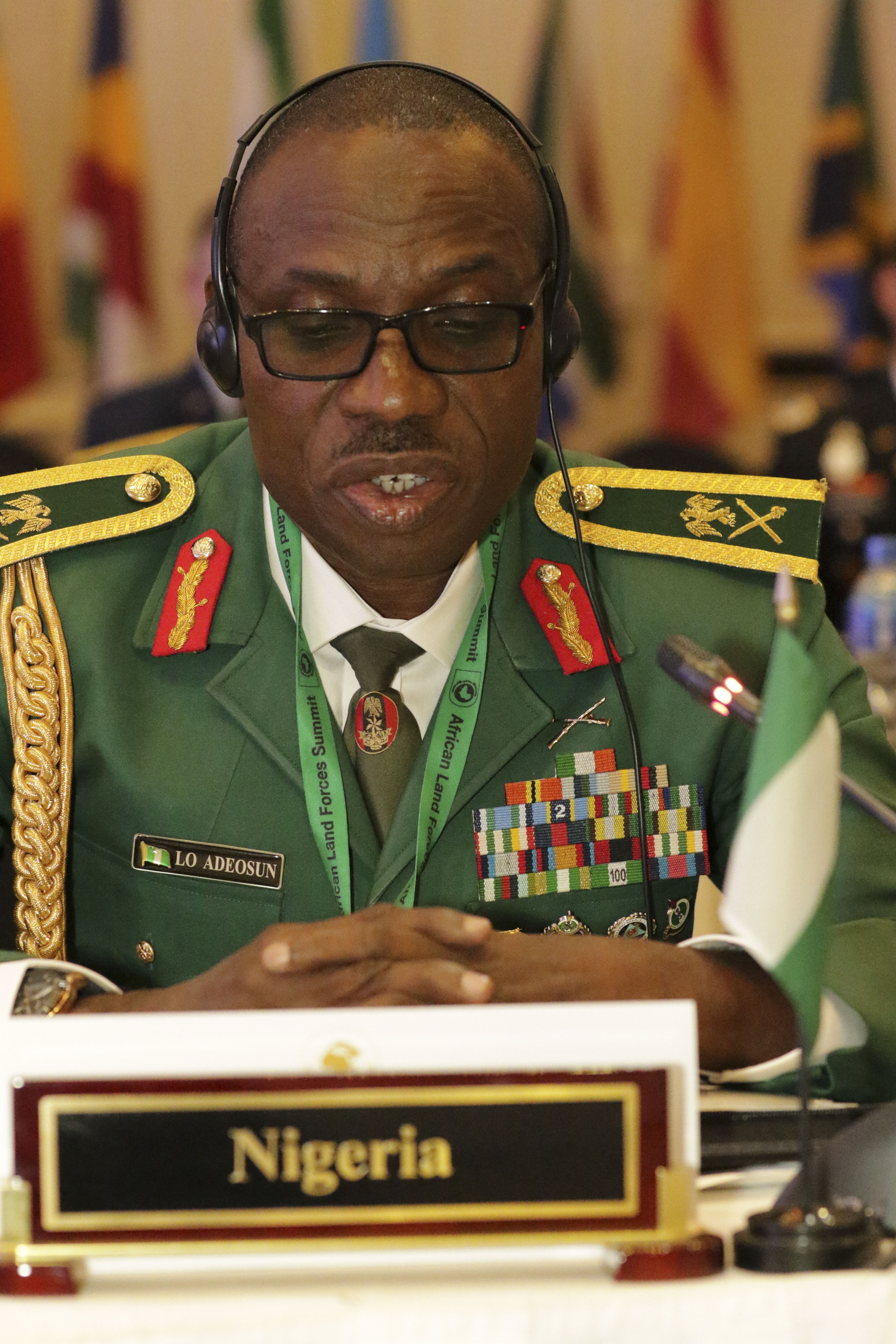
- Adeosun in 2019

Army Chief of Policy and Plans
- In office July 2019 – November 2021

Army Chief of Training and Operations
- In office July 2018 – July 2019

Commander, Nigerian Army Infantry Corps
- In office December 2017 – July 2018

Commander, Multinational Joint Task Force
- In office January 2016 – May 2017
- Preceded by: Maj-Gen. Iliya Abbah
- Succeeded by: Maj-Gen. Lucky Irabor

General Officer Commanding, 7 Division
- In office 2014 or 2015 – January 2016
- Preceded by: Maj Gen. A. Mohammed
- Succeeded by: Brig-Gen. Victor Ezugwu

Personal details
- Born: 22 August 1963 (age 63) Ola Oluwa, Western Region (now in Osun State), Nigeria
- Education: Nigerian Defence Academy

Military service
- Allegiance: Nigeria
- Branch/service: Nigerian Army
- Years of service: 1983–2021
- Rank: Lieutenant general
- Battles/wars: Sierra Leone Civil War; Liberian Civil War; Second Congo War; Boko Haram insurgency 2015 West African offensive

Lamidi Adeosun (born 22 August 1963) is a retired Nigerian Army lieutenant general.

== Early life and early military career ==
Adeosun was born in Ola-Oluwa Local Government of Osun State on 22 August 1963.

He was commissioned into the Nigerian Army on 4 July 1983. He fought during the wars in Liberia, Sierra Leone and DR Congo. He was a weapons and tactics instructor at Armed Forces Command and Staff College, Jaji.

== Active service ==
He was posted to Maiduguri and promoted major general by Army Headquarters in the wake of the 2014 Chibok ambush. He was the General Officer Commanding (GOC) of 7th Division in Maiduguri. As the GOC his area of responsibility was the main theatre of battle and operations in the Lake Chad and northeastern Nigeria. He arrived Maiduguri after troops of 7th Division of the Nigerian Army mutinied at Maimalari Barracks in Maiduguri attempting to kill Maj-Gen A. Mohammed.

He then led the 2015 West African offensive against Boko Haram. He used the 72nd Mobile Strike Force as the spearhead of his offensive. The operational plan included isolating Boko Haram by cutting a dividing line across northeastern Nigeria isolating them into two defined areas in the east and west, the Chadian troops attacked from the western border of Lake Chad and the 7th Division struck eastwards seizing towns held by terrorists in the areas, with the troops of the infantry division holding the territories seized. According to British tabloid The Telegraph, the offensive led by 7th Division successfully overran 11 local districts of Nigeria that was previously claimed by Boko Haram as a territorial "caliphate" which was the "size of Belgium".

He was later redeployed to command the Multinational Joint Task Force (MNJTF), headquartered in Chad. He then returned to Nigeria at Defence Headquarters in Abuja as the Director of Administration. He was the commander of the Infantry Corps from December 2017 to July 2018. He commanded the infantry corps until July 2018 when he was deployed to Army Headquarters as Chief of Training and Operations. In July 2019, Adeosun was promoted by President Muhammadu Buhari to the rank of Lieutenant General, the second highest rank in the Nigerian Army, and was appointed Chief of Policy and Plans at Army Headquarters and head of the Department of Army Policy and Plans where he retired in November 2021.
