= First Battle of Damboa =

- Part of Boko Haram insurgency
| Date | 9 January 2014 |
| Location | Damboa, Borno State, Nigeria |
| Result | Nigerian victory |

Belligerents
| Nigeria | Boko Haram |

Units involved
| 7th Division: 195th Battalion | Unknown |

Casualties and losses
| 1 killed 2 injured | 38+ killed Many injured |

On 9 January 2014, militants from Boko Haram attacked the city of Damboa, Borno State, Nigeria, with the assault being repelled by Nigerian forces. At least 38 militants were killed during the battle. Boko Haram attacked the city for a second time in July 2014, capturing it.

== Background ==
Boko Haram emerged in 2009 as a jihadist social and political movement in a failed rebellion in northeast Nigeria. Throughout the following years, Abubakar Shekau unified militant Islamist groups in the region and continued to foment the rebellion against the Nigerian government, conducting terrorist attacks and bombings in cities and communities across the region. Several weeks prior to the battle of Damboa, Boko Haram militants attacked the city of Bama, leaving dozens of militants dead. Damboa borders the Sambisa Forest, a known Boko Haram hideout.

== Battle ==
Colonel Mohammed Dole, a spokesman for the Nigerian Army, stated on 9 January that soldiers from the 195th Battalion had repelled a Boko Haram attack on a military base in Damboa. Dole said the attack occurred at around 1am against the 195th's barracks. The militants were repelled with heavy casualties and many injuries. Nigerian authorities said that at least 38 militants were killed, and many others were injured. One Nigerian soldier was killed and two were wounded during the battle. A Nigerian counter-offensive also commenced in the forest against the perpetrators. Food, IEDs, and weapons were seized by Nigerian forces.
