= Second Battle of Damboa =

- Part of Boko Haram insurgency
Date	4 July 2014
Location	Damboa, Borno State, Nigeria
Result	Nigerian victory: Half of Damboa is destroyed

Belligerents
Nigeria	Boko Haram

Strength
Unknown	200

Casualties and losses
20+ killed	53 killed
- Unknown amount of civilians killed

On 4 July 2014, militants from Boko Haram attacked the city of Damboa, Borno State, Nigeria, killing 20 Nigerian soldiers and over 50 militants. The battle was the second attempt by Boko Haram to seize Damboa after a failed first attempt in January.

== Background ==
Boko Haram emerged in 2009 as a jihadist social and political movement in a failed rebellion in northeast Nigeria. Throughout the following years, Abubakar Shekau unified militant Islamist groups in the region and continued to foment the rebellion against the Nigerian government, conducting terrorist attacks and bombings in cities and communities across the region. Damboa had been attacked in January 2014, with Boko Haram failing to capture the city.

== Battle ==
Around 200 militants assaulted the barracks and police station in Damboa on 4 July, utilizing four armored vehicles. Nigerian forces repelled the attack, but many residents fled the town with survivors saying that half the town was destroyed including the police station. Nigerian officials announced on 5 July that six soldiers were killed in the fighting, including a high-ranking officer, and that 53 militants were killed. Survivors told AFP that the death toll was likely much higher for civilians and soldiers. The Nigerian newspaper Vanguard said that at least 70 people were killed during the clashes.

Nigerien newspaper The Daily Post said that government losses were much higher than reported. Through witness testimony, the newspaper collected evidence that at least 12 soldiers, 4 policemen, and 4 pro-government vigilantes were killed, while confirming the Nigerian government's account of 50 dead jihadists. The jihadists that took part in the battle were the same perpetrators of the Kummabzan kidnapping, where 60 women and 30 boys were kidnapped in late June.

== Aftermath ==
Just two weeks later on 18 July, Boko Haram militants attacked Damboa again, with the group massacreing civilians who didn't submit to their rule. At least 100 civilians were killed in the massacre. Boko Haram cemented their control of Damboa after the attack.
