= Adeosun =

Adeosun is a surname. Notable people with the surname include:

- Kemi Adeosun (born 1967), Nigerian politician and banker
- Lamidi Adeosun (born 1963), Nigerian Army officer
- Oluwole Adeosun (1938–2012), Nigerian banker, accountant and public servant
