= Mamman Kontagora =

Nigerian politician

Major General Mamman Kontagora

Administrator of the Federal Capital Territory
- In office August 1998 – May 1999
- Preceded by: Jeremiah Timbut Useni
- Succeeded by: Ibrahim Bunu

Personal details
- Born: April 20, 1944 Kontagora, Niger
- Died: May 29, 2013 (aged 69) Abuja, Nigeria

Military service
- Allegiance: Nigeria
- Branch/service: Nigerian Army
- Rank: Major General

Mamman Kontagora (April 20, 1944 – May 29, 2013) was Military Administrator of the Federal Capital Territory, Nigeria during the transitional regime of General Abdulsalam Abubakar, handing over control to a civilian in May 1999.

== Biography ==
Kontagora was among the first intake of officers when the Nigerian Defense Academy opened in 1964.

Kontagora was appointed Minister of Works and Housing in the Babangida government. In 1991 he issued regulations on pollution abatement and effluent limitations covering all industries, with heavy fines for non-compliance. However, follow-up by the government on infractors was limited. In December 1991, he announced plans to draw up guidelines by early 1992 to control oil pollution. The Sani Abacha government appointed Kontagora sole administrator of Ahmadu Bello University, Zaria in 1995 after a major conflict at the university. He remained in charge until some time after the death of Abacha.

Kontagora was appointed Administrator of the Federal Capital Territory (FCT) on 22 August 1998. The brief period when Kontagora was in charge of the FCT saw a boom in construction of housing and infrastructure. Kontagora ceded a strategic plot next to the International Conference centre to the Abuja Horticultural Society to develop as a world standard park, now the Abuja International Peace Park, finally opened in 2003. In January 1999 Kontagora said that all structures had been put in place to ensure a smooth transition to democracy in May 1999.

Kontagora was a candidate to represent the People's Democratic Party (PDP) in the 2003 elections for FCT Senator, but was defeated in the primaries by Isa Maina, who went on to be elected. In October 2004 Kontagora announced that he would be a candidate to contest the 2007 presidential elections on the PDP platform. He was cleared as a candidate by the PDP, but was defeated by Umaru Yar'Adua, who went on to be elected. He died in the late hours of May 29, 2013. He was 69. As a memorial, Kotagora has a square named after him in the Ahmadu Bello University.
