= Mohammed Daggash =

Nigerian politician (born 1960)

Senator Mohammed Daggash
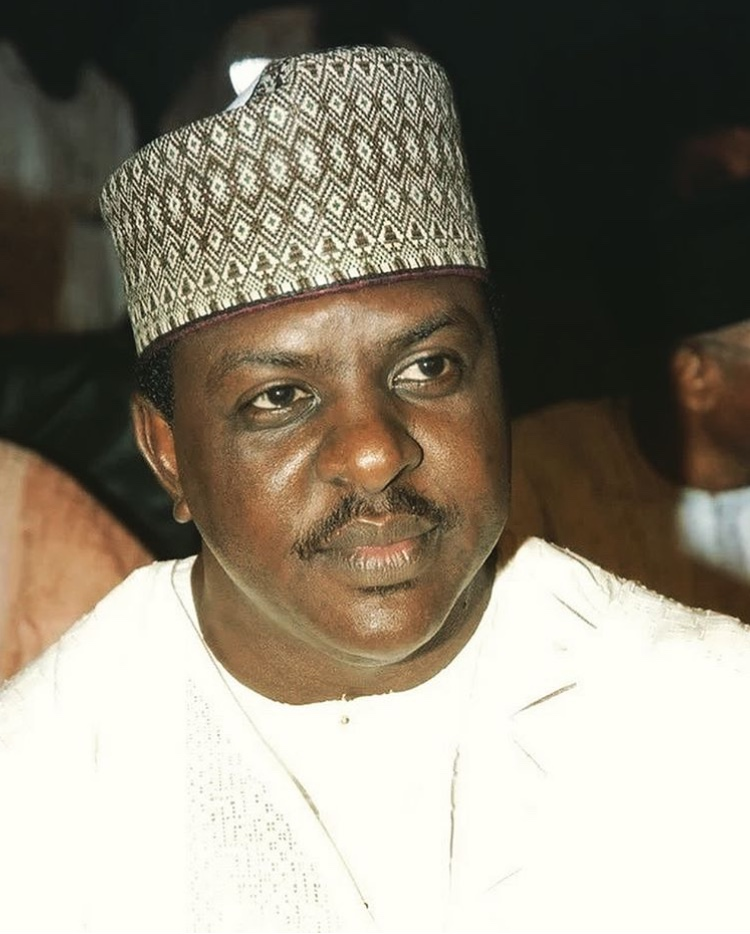

Minister of Works
- In office 6 April 2010 – July 2011
- Preceded by: Hassan Muhammed Lawal
- Succeeded by: Mike Onolememen

Minister for National Planning
- In office July 2007 – October 2008
- Succeeded by: Shamsuddeen Usman

Senator for Borno North
- In office 3 June 2003 – 5 June 2007
- Preceded by: Maina Maaji Lawan
- Succeeded by: Maina Maaji Lawan

Member of the House of Representatives for Marte, Monguno, and Nganzi
- In office 3 June 1999 – 3 June 2003

Personal details
- Born: 22 December 1960 (age 65) Marte, Northern Region, Nigeria (now in Borno State, Nigeria)
- Party: People's Democratic Party
- Relations: Al-Amin Daggash (brother)
- Parents: Musa Daggash (father); Laraba Daggash (mother)
- Occupation: Politician; architect

Mohammed Sanusi Daggash (born 22 December 1960) is a Nigerian architect, economist and politician who was elected as a member of the Federal House of Representatives in 1999, and became Senator for Borno North (Borno State) in 2003. President Umaru Yar'Adua appointed him minister for the National Planning Commission of Nigeria in July 2007, and relieved him of his post in October 2008. He was again reappointed as minister for works in April 2010 by acting president Goodluck Jonathan.

== Background ==
Mohammed Sanusi Daggash was born on 22 December 1960 in Kironewa, Marte Local Government Area, Borno State. He attended the Capacity School, Kaduna (1966–1973) and the King's College, Lagos (1973–1978). He attended Ahmadu Bello University, Zaria in 1978, obtaining an MSc in architecture in 1984. Daggash served under the NYSC scheme (1984–1985) with the Ministry of Works and Housing in Borno State. In 1985, he became a Commonwealth Scholar, attending University College, London where he attained an M.Sc. in development economics in 1986. He also attended a graduate program in Harvard University in 1988.

Returning to Nigeria in 1986, Daggash established a Consultancy Firm (Mass Consult – Nigeria) in Kaduna. In 1989, he was appointed to the Nigeria Football Association Board for a four-year period. He worked in various jobs in consultancy and construction until he joined politics during the Sani Abacha period. In 1995, he started study for a master's degree in Public Administration, and was awarded the degree in 1998. He was a member of Finance Committee of the United Nigeria Congress Party (UNCP). Later he was a founding member of the People's Democratic Party (PDP) and served on the National Establishment Committee. He was elected into the House of Representatives in 1999 for the Marte, Monguno, and Nganzi constituency of Borno State.

== Senate career ==
Running as a People's Democratic Party (PDP) candidate, Daggash was declared elected as senator in the 5th (2003–2007) National Assembly representing Borno North Senatorial District. His ANPP opponent, Hajia Fati Ibrahim Bulama appealed the result, and following various appeals Daggash's election was nullified in November 2003. However, the court also found that Bulama had not been qualified to stand for election. By June 2004, the Independent National Electoral Commission had yet to organize fresh elections for the vacant seat. In the end, Daggash retained his seat.

He served in ten different Senate Committees during his tenure. He was deputy chairman, Senate Committee on Population and I.D. Card, and a member of Senate Committees on FCT, Capital Market, Loans and Debt, Banking, Currency and Finance Parliamentary Network On World Bank (PNWB). He was also a member of the board of directors of the Guinea Insurance Company.

He was the PDP candidate for Borno North in the April 2007 Senate elections, but withdrew from the race some few days to elections in protest of the massive riggings by the ruling ANPP that characterized the preceding gubernatorial elections. The senate seat was later declared won by the All Nigeria People's Party (ANPP) Maina Maaji Lawan.

== Later career ==
Daggash was appointed Minister for National Planning in July 2007. In February 2008, he was among a Nigerian delegation headed by Shamsudeen Usman, the Minister for Finance, that visited China. After the meeting, Vice Minister Yu signed bilateral agreements with Daggash. In October 2008, Daggash announced that Nigeria had cut the benchmark oil price in the draft 2009 budget to $45 per barrel due to sharp falls in world crude oil prices. Later that month he was relieved of his position.

In 2008, Daggash became a Director of Effectivo Capital, an investment and asset management company based in Abuja.

In November 2009, Daggash was among the "stakeholders" in the Borno State PDP who were protesting against a move by the National party leaders to impose party chairmen and executives in the state.

Daggash was appointed Minister of Works and Housing on 6 April 2010.

== See also ==
- List of Nigerian architects
