= Salihu =

Salihu is a given name. Notable people with the name include:

- Salihu Ibrahim (1935–2018), Nigerian army general
- Salihu Modibbo Alfa Belgore (born 1937), Nigerian Jurist and Chief Justice of Nigeria
- Salihu Mustafa (born 1948), Nigerian academic and engineer
- Salihu Sagir Takai (born 1955), Nigerian politician
- Salihu Tunde Bello, Nigerian general
- Salihu Yakubu-Danladi (born 1985), Nigerian engineer and politician
- Salihu Zaway Uba, Nigerian official of the United Nations
