= Battle of Damboa =

Date	6 October 2013
Location	Damboa, Nigeria
Result	Nigerian victory

Belligerents
Boko Haram	Nigeria

Units involved
25 Task Force Brigade	7th Division

Strength
Unknown	Unknown

Casualties and losses
15 killed	None
- 7 civilians killed Several civilians injured

Battle of Domboa was fought between 7th Division of Nigerian military and Boko Haram insurgents in morning hours of 6 October 2013. Boko Haram entered the village at 4:30 AM, they forced priest of the local mosque to call for civilians to come to the mosque after which they opened fire on them, killing seven and injuring several. Insurgents managed to burn several buildings before the Nigerian army intervened, after which clashes occurred in which 15 Boko Haram insurgents were killed, other insurgents escaped. Nigerian military seized one rocket-propelled grenade tube, two rocket-propelled grenade bombs, five AK 47 rifles, a pickup van and assorted ammunition from the insurgents.
