= Infantry Corps =

Infantry Corps may refer to:

- Infantry Corps (Ireland)
- Infantry Corps (Israel)
- Infantry Corps (Malaysia)
- Mexican Naval Infantry Corps
- Nigerian Army Infantry Corps
- Royal Australian Infantry Corps
- Royal Canadian Infantry Corps
- Royal Infantry Corps (disambiguation)

== See also ==
- Corps
- Infantry
