= Paul Ogbebor =

Nigerian Civil War Veteran

Paul Osakpamwan Ogbebor Lt Colonel

Personal details
- Born: 24 May 1939 Benin City
- Died: February 19th 2020 (aged 80) Benin
- Spouse: Rita Olori-Ogbebor

Military service
- Allegiance: Nigeria

Paul Osakpamwan Ogbebor (1939–2020) was a Nigerian military officer and civil war veteran. He was the first Nigerian to be enrolled in the cadets of course 1 of the Nigerian Defence Academy.

== Early life and education ==
Ogbebor was born on May 24, 1939, in Benin City, Edo state, Nigeria. He had his military education at the Nigerian Defence Academy, NDA.

=== Death ===
Lt Colonel Ogbebor died on February 19, 2020, in Benin City, Edo State, Nigeria.
