= Mohammed Tasiu Ibrahim =

Major general Mohammed Tasiu Ibrahim

Commandant of the Nigerian Defence Academy
- In office August 2015 – October 2017
- Preceded by: Maj-Gen. Muhammad Inuwa Idris
- Succeeded by: Maj-Gen Adeniyi Oyebade

Personal details
- Born: 1 October 1961 (age 64)
- Education: Nigerian Defence Academy; Government Secondary School, Zaria

Military service
- Allegiance: Nigeria
- Branch/service: Nigerian Army
- Years of service: 1981–2017
- Rank: Major general

Mohammed Tasiu Ibrahim (born 1 October 1961) is a retired Nigerian Army major general who served as the 27th commandant of the Nigerian Defence Academy. He was appointed Commandant in July 2015 by the Chief of Army Staff, Maj-Gen Tukur Yusuf Buratai succeeding Major General Muhammad Inuwa Idris

== Background and education ==
Ibrahim was born on October 1, 1961, in Gumel, Jigawa State. He attended Gumel Gabas primary school in Gumel town and later completed his primary education in Tudun-jukun Primary School Zaria 1974. He proceeded to Government Secondary School Giwa, Zaria from 1974 to 1979 where he obtained his West African Senior School Certificate.

After working for a year (between 1979 and 1980) with First Bank of Nigeria in Kano, he enrolled at the Nigerian Defence Academy as a member of the 29th Regular Combatant Course (including other officers such as Tukur Yusuf Buratai) from January 1981 to December 1983, when he received his commission into the Nigerian Army as a 2nd Lieutenant.

== Career ==
Ibrahim served as the chief of the Nigerian Army's Standard and Evaluation Department prior to his appointment as Commandant of the NDA. He retired from the Nigerian Army in October 2017.

=== Units and formations served ===
- Defunct 41 Mech Bn - 1983 to 1986
- Depot Nigerian Army, Zaria – 1986 to 1994
- HQ 13 Bde – 1994 to 1995
- SO2 Recruitment Kaduna State – 1995 to 1999
- Coy Comd 5 Bn – 1999
- AFCSC S1 list – 1999 to 2000
- Nigerian Military School – 2000 to 2001
- NIBATT 8 (195 Bn) – 2001 to 2002
- Infantry Corp Centre and School – 2002 to 2003
- AHQ DOA – 2003 to 2004
- 82 Demo Bn – 2004 to 2006
- NASI, SWW – ICCS 2006 to 2008
- Amphibious Training School 2010 to 2013
- HQ 1 Bde – 2013 to 2015
- AHQ DAPP – 28 Jan to 27 Apr 2015
- AHQ CASE – 27 Apr to 30 Jul 2015

=== Appointments ===
- Adjutant/IO 41 Bn.
- PL Comd/Instr Depot NA.
- GSO3 Trg Ops 13 Bde.
- DAQ 13 Bde.
- SO2 Recruitment Kaduna State
- Coy Comd 5 Bn.
- Senior Instructor NMS.
- Bn 2ic NIBATT 8 UNAMSIL (195 Bn).
- Senior Instructor/CO Admin ICCS.
- SO1 Record AHQ DOAA.
- CO 82 Demo Bn.
- Chief Instructor SWW-ICCS.
- Comdt ATS – 2010 to 2012
- Comd HQ 1 Bde – 2013 to 2015
- Director of Policy – 28 Jan to 27 Apr 2015
- Chief of Army Standard and Evaluation – 27 Apr to 30 Jul 2015
