= Al-Amin Daggash =

7th Chief of Defence Staff of Nigeria (born 1942)

Air Marshal Al-Amin Daggash CFR
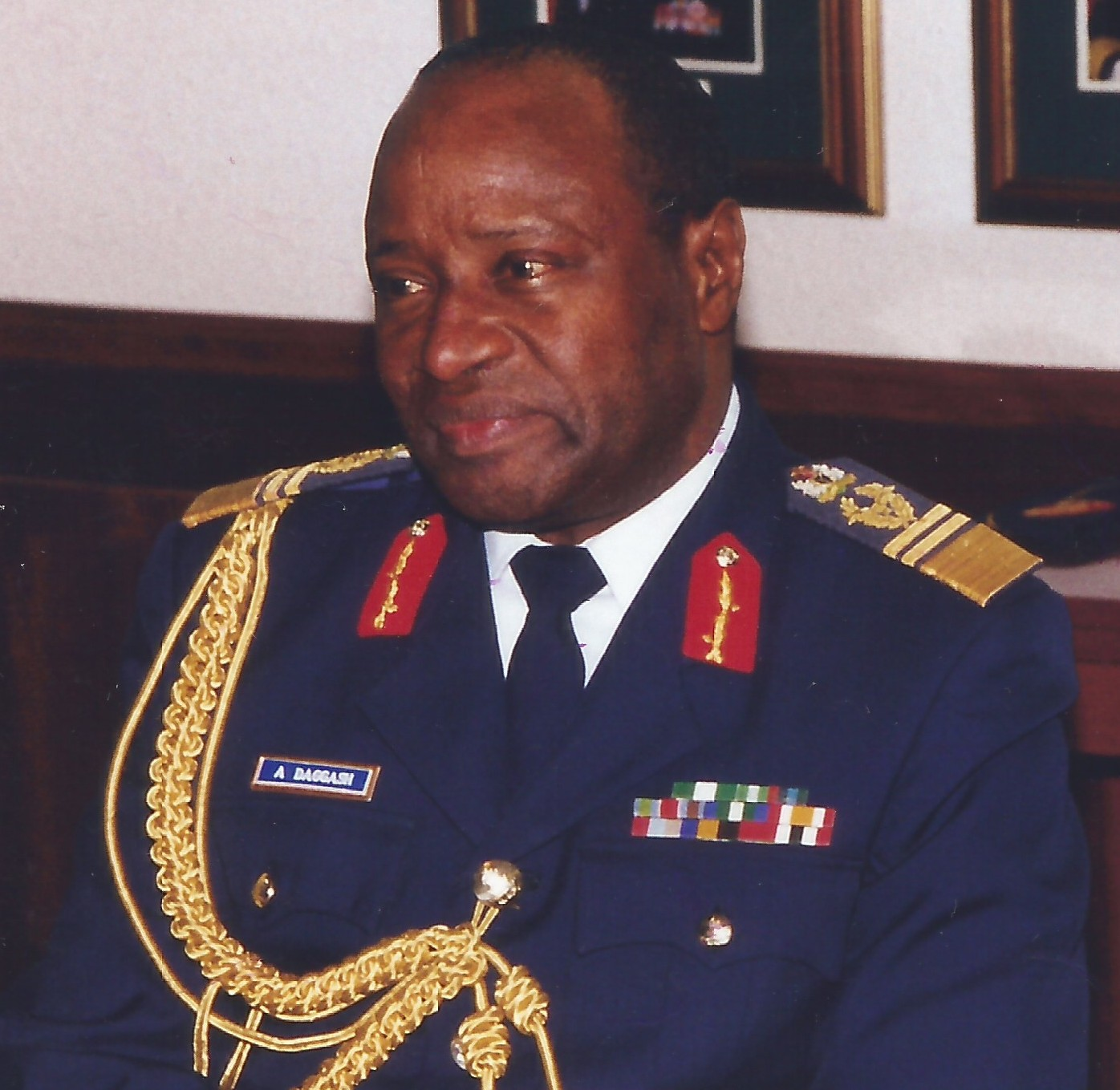

Chief of Defence Staff
- In office 10 June 1998 – 29 May 1999
- Preceded by: Abdulsalami Abubakar
- Succeeded by: Ibrahim Ogohi

Commandant of the Nigerian Defence Academy
- In office 1994 – June 1998
- Preceded by: Mohammed Balarabe Haladu
- Succeeded by: Bashir Salihi Magashi

Personal details
- Born: 1 October 1942 (age 83) Kirenowa, Northern Region, British Nigeria (now in Borno State, Nigeria)
- Relations: Mohammed Daggash (Brother)
- Parent: Musa Daggash (father)
- Profession: Engineer
- Awards: Commander of the Order of the Federal Republic

Military service
- Allegiance: Nigeria
- Branch/service: Nigerian Air Force
- Years of service: 1963–1999
- Rank: Air marshal
- Commands: Commander, Flying Training Group, Kano; Air Officer Commanding, Training Command; Air Officer Logistics, HQ NAF; Commandant, Nigerian Defence Academy; Chief of the Nigerian Defence Staff
- Battles/wars: Nigerian Civil War

Al-Amin Musa Daggash CFR (born 1 October 1942) is a retired Air Marshal of the Nigerian Air Force who served as the 7th Chief of Defence Staff of Nigeria from 1998 to 1999 under the General Abdulsalami Abubakar regime.

He was the first non-army officer to hold that position in Nigeria's history, before him, this position was exclusively occupied by army officers. He was also the first and till date the only non-army officer to be the commandant of the Nigerian Defence Academy, Kaduna.

During the Abdulsalami Abubakar administration, Daggash was third in command and for that, he was awarded the distinctive national honour of Grand Commander of the Order of the Niger (GCON) in the government gazette 179 volume 85 December 1998, which was rescinded by the Obasanjo administration.

He was later awarded the national honour of Commander of the Federal Republic (CFR) in 2005.

== Background ==
Al-Amin Daggash was born in 1942 in Kirenowa, Marte local government of Borno State. He is of the Shuwa Arab ethnic stock and one of the eldest children of super Permanent-Secretary, Musa Daggash. His father was a civil servant who worked in many parts of the country, Daggash had his primary education in several schools in the North and South of Nigeria. He began his secondary education at the Abeokuta Grammar School in Ogun State, he then completed it at Science Secondary School, Kuru in Plateau State.

In August 1963, he was enlisted into the Nigerian Air Force as an Officer Cadet. He was part of the first batch of Nigerian Air Force officer cadets and received his basic military training in Kaduna. He completed his military training in Faßberg Air Base, Germany where he obtained a diploma in Aircraft Maintenance Engineering.

== Military career ==
Daggash was commissioned as Second-Lieutenant in the Nigerian Air Force on 27 September 1967. Over the course of his long and illustrious career, he attended several engineering and aircraft maintenance courses, such as:

- Basic/Advance Aircraft Maintenance Courses at Faßberg Air Base, Germany 1964–1965;
- Basic Technical Course at Aircraft Factory, Helwan, Egypt 1967–1968;
- Aircraft Maintenance Course at the Chanute Air Force Base, Illinois, USA 1971–1972;
- Engineer/Airframe and Engine courses on the L-29 and L-39 aircraft 1975–1977; and
- Alpha Jet Aircraft Final Course in engineering and logistics with Dornier, West Germany 1979.

He also attended several military and strategic studies courses like:

- Junior Command and Leadership course at RAF Ternhill, United Kingdom 1973; and
- Senior Division Staff course at the Armed Forces Command and Staff College, Jaji 1978.

From 1985 to 1986 at the rank of Group Captain, Daggash attended the US Air War College (AWC) in Montgomery, Alabama where he gained a diploma in Educational Development from the International Officers School. He went on to receive a second diploma in Defence and Strategic Studies from the AWC, Air University, Alabama.

Daggash commanded various formations during his career, such as:

- Commander, Flying Training Group, Kano;
- Director of Works, HQ NAF;
- Director of Engineering, HQ NAF;
- Director of Supply, HQ NAF;
- Air Officer Commanding, Training Command;
- Air Officer Logistics, HQ NAF;
- Commandant Nigerian Defence Academy; and
- Chief of the Nigerian Defence Staff.

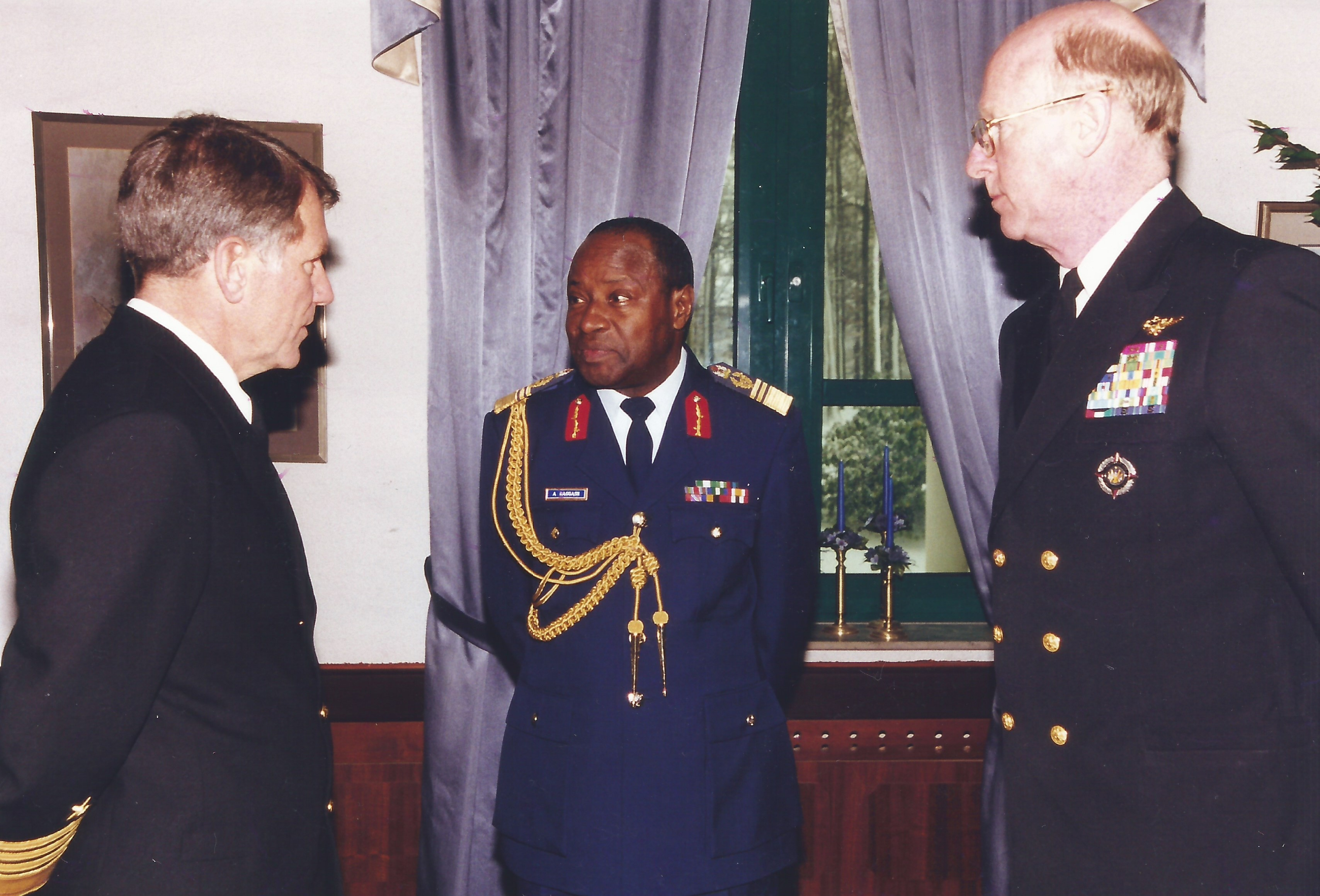
Air Marshal Al-amin Daggash during a visit to US European Command, Stuttgart, Germany

Daggash was promoted to the rank of Air Commodore in December 1986. He was appointed Air Officer Commanding (AOC) Training Command of the Nigerian Air Force in 1990 and Chief of Air Force Logistics and Communications branch at the service HQ between 1992 and 1994. He was promoted to the rank of Air Vice Marshal in December 1991. Daggash was appointed as the deputy commandant and subsequently commandant of the Nigerian Defence Academy between 1994 and 1998. He was then appointed as Chief of Defence Staff by General Abdulsalami Abubakar. He was promoted to the rank of Air Marshal on 10 June 1998. Daggash is considered to be one of the few thoroughbred officers who rose through the ranks without ever holding a political appointment even though the military were in government for 28 of the 36 years he served. He retired from service on 29 May in 1999. In recognition of his achievements, Daggash was inducted into the International Honor Roll, Air University presented at the Maxwell Air Force Base, Alabama on 1 June 2004.

== Post-retirement ==
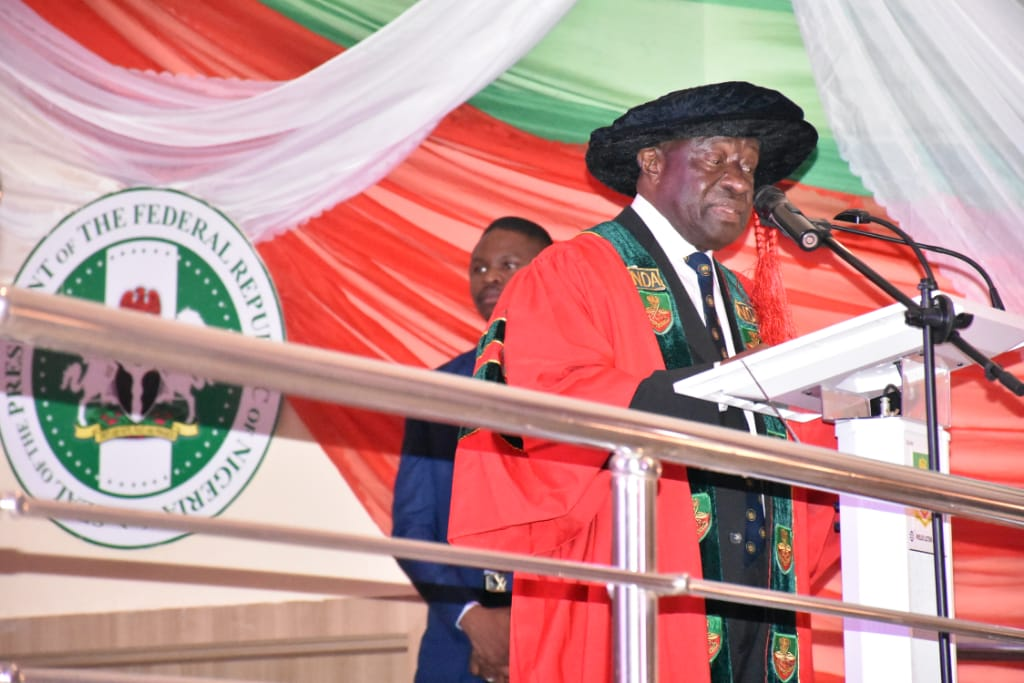
Air Marshal Al-amin Daggash giving his acceptance speech at the Nigerian Defence Academy

Daggash was active in the Borno Elders Forum as well as the Northern Elders Forum, both forums mounted severe pressure on the Goodluck Jonathan administration over its careless handling of the Boko Haram crisis especially between 2013 and 2015.

On 3 October 2019, Daggash received an honorary doctorate degree in military science from the Nigerian Defence Academy.

== Awards ==
- Commander of the Federal Republic of Nigeria
- Army Silver Jubilee Medal
- United Nations Medal UNPROFOR
- Forces Service Star
- Defence Service Medal
- National Service Medal
- General Service Medal
- Republic Medal
