= Training and Doctrine Command (Nigeria) =

Training and Doctrine Command (TRADOC)
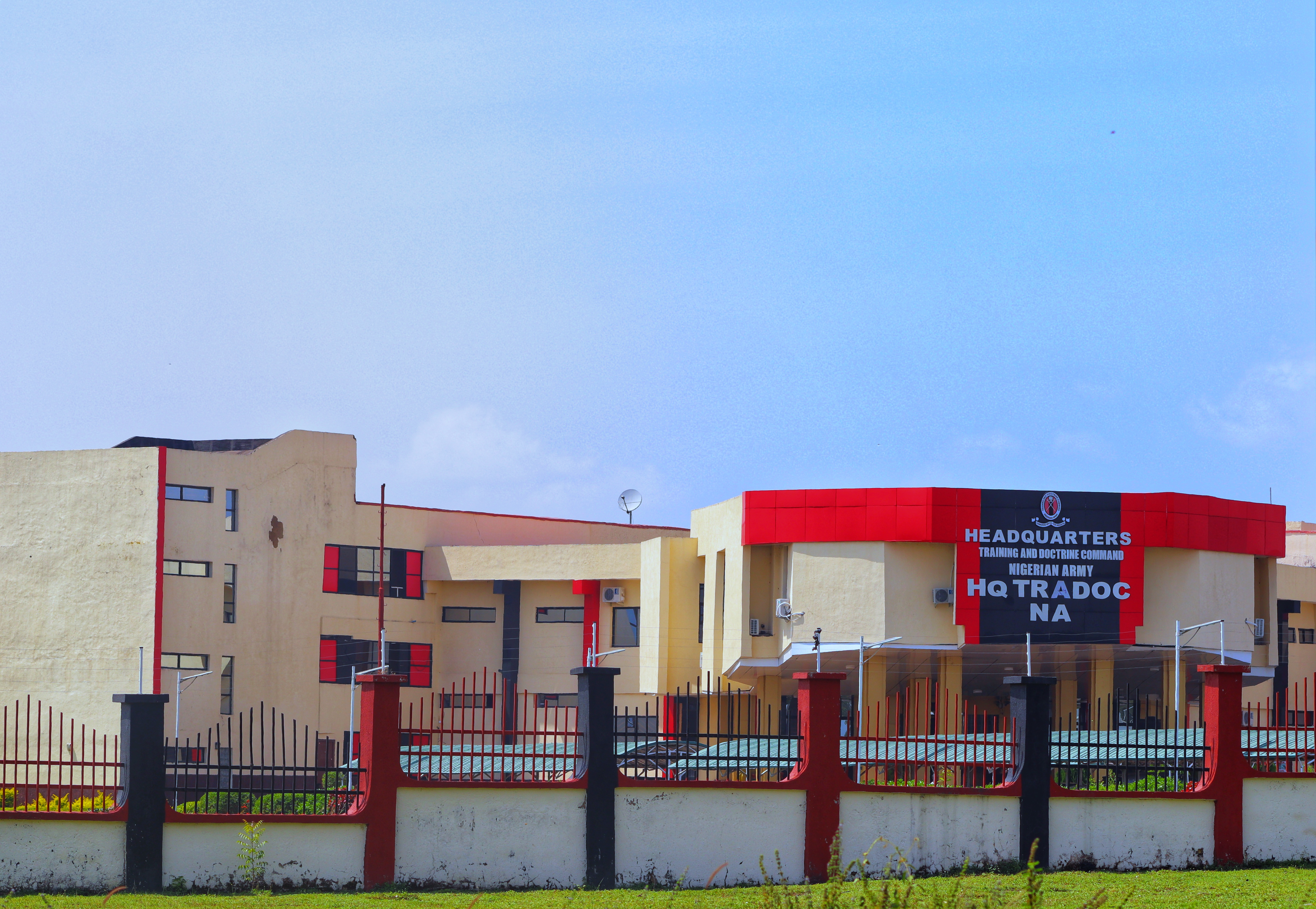
- Command headquarters
- Active: 1981–present
- Country: Nigeria
- Branch: Nigerian Army
- Type: Army Command
- Role: military recruitment basic military training and education
- Garrison/HQ: Minna, Niger State, Middle Belt
- Website: TRADOC Army Website

Commanders
- Current commander: Major General Kelvin Aligbe
- Notable commanders: General Abayomi Olonisakin; General Lucky Irabor

Training and Doctrine Command (TRADOC) supervises the training schools and combat development in the Nigerian Army. It is headquartered in Minna in the Niger State. TRADOC is charged with doctrinal training and combat development, supervising training centers. It also serves as a senior think-tank in Nigeria. TRADOC was formed in 1981 under the leadership of Major General Geoffrey Obiaje Ejiga, and currently supervises all the Army's schools, as well as an army depot. Before the establishment of the Nigerian Army Resources Centre (NARC) in 2015, TRADOC also served as a liaison centre for the Army.

The origins of the command date to a mission dispatched by the COAS to see how foreign armies ran their training schools. The report of the committee recommended the adoption of the United States Army Training and Doctrine Command model.

== Functions ==
The command supports army training and coordinates research on the development of army corps and schools. It serves as a liaison between the army and educational establishments in ensuring the professional development of junior officers in the field. When more than one Nigerian Army divisions deploy, it serves as a corps headquarters to command them.

== Structure ==
The command consists of TRADOC Headquarters, including four departments; 18 corps training schools; a museum; a training depot; and a command college. TRADOC also sponsors the Nigerian Military School at Zaria.

List of organisations:

- Departments
  - Department of Doctrine and Combat Development
  - Department of Training
  - Department of Research Development, Test and Evaluation
  - Directorate of Army Training Support Center
- Schools
  - Nigerian Army School of Infantry (NASI)
  - Army Armor School (NAAS)
  - Army School of Artillery (NASA)
  - Army School of Engineering (NASME)
  - Army School of Signals (NASS)
  - Army Intelligence School (NAIS)
  - Army School of Supply and Transport (NASST)
  - Army Ordnance School (NAOS)
  - Army School of Medical Science (NASMS)
  - Army School of Electrical and Mechanical Engineering (NASEME)
  - Army School of Military Police (NASMP)
  - Army School of Education (NASE)
  - Army School of Finance and Account (NASFA)
  - Army School of Music (NASM)
  - Army School of Physical Training (ASPT)
  - Amphibious Training School (ATS)
  - Army School of Islamic Affairs (NASIA)
  - Army School of Public Relations and Information (NASPRI)
  - Nigerian Army Museum (NAM)
  - Depot Nigerian Army, Zaria
  - Depot Nigerian Army, Osogbo
  - Depot Nigerian Army, Amasiri-Edda
  - Nigerian Army College of Logistics (NACOL)

== Commanders ==
- Major General Geoffrey Obiaje Ejiga (1981–????)
- Major General Salihu Zaway Uba (2012 – September 2013)
- Major General Abayomi Olonisakin (September 2013 – July 2015)
- Major General Mobolaji Adeleke Koleoso (July 2015 – May 2016)
- Major General R. O. Yusuf (10 May 2017 – 2018)
- Major General Abubakar Tarfa (2019 – 29 July 2020)
- Major General Lucky Irabor (29 July 2020 – 29 January 2021)
- Major General Stevenson Olabanji (3 July 2021 – 29 June 2023)
- Major General Kelvin Aligbe (29 June 2023 – present)

== See also ==
- Armed Forces Training Authority (Egypt)
- Military Educational and Scientific Center
- Indonesian Army Doctrine, Education and Training Development Command
