= Depot Nigerian Army =

Military training institution of the Nigerian Army

Coordinates: 11.099°N 7.736°E

Depot Nigerian Army, Zaria
- Country: Nigeria
- Branch: Nigerian Army
- Type: Training
- Role: Basic military training and education
- Part of: TRADOC
- Garrison/HQ: Chindit Cantonment, Zaria, Kaduna State

Depot Nigerian Army is the premier and oldest basic military training institution in Nigeria. Located at Chindit Cantonment in Zaria, Kaduna State, the depot is responsible for the initial basic training of all enlisted personnel of the Nigerian Army. The institution operates under the supervision of the Army's Training and Doctrine Command (TRADOC).

== Mandate ==
Recruits are organized by companies named A-H, and the basic military training program historically runs for a period of six months. Upon the successful completion of the training cycle, recruits participate in a formal Passing Out Parade reviewed by high-ranking military and government dignitaries. During the ceremony, they take the oath of allegiance and are formally inducted into the army with the rank of Private.

== History ==
It was established in 1924 during the British colonial administration of the Colony and Protectorate of Nigeria as the Regimental Depot of the Nigeria Regiment under the umbrella of the Royal West African Frontier Force (RWAFF). It was set up to recruit, train, and supply indigenous West African soldiers following World War I. Throughout the colonial period, the depot was the sole port of entry for enlistment in the British Army, with soldiers being deployed during the East African Campaign and the Burma Campaign of World War II.

Following Nigeria's independence in 1960, the institution was renamed the Depot Nigerian Army. During the Nigerian Civil War, the depot's training output was scaled up to meet the manpower requirements of the army, and in the decades that followed, the depot shifted its focus toward peacekeeping operations in West Africa under the auspices of Economic Community of West African States Monitoring Group and United Nations Peacekeeping. Until 2025-2026, Zaria was the sole training center for enlisted personnel. Due to escalating security challenges, the Federal Government under President Bola Tinubu authorized a massive expansion of the army's strength, resulting in the establishment of Depot Nigerian Army, Osogbo and Depot Nigerian Army, Amasiri-Edda.

== Chindit Cantonment ==
Chindit Cantonment, also known as Chindit Barracks. The cantonment is named after the Chindits, special operations units of the British and Indian armies which saw action in 1943–1944 during the Burma Campaign of World War II. In 2021, a fire occurred at Chindit Cantonment, with no casualties were recorded.

== See also ==
- Nigerian Defence Academy
- Nigerian Army
- Nigerian Military School
