= Anthony Atolagbe =

Nigerian army general (born 1965)

Major general Anthony Atolagbe
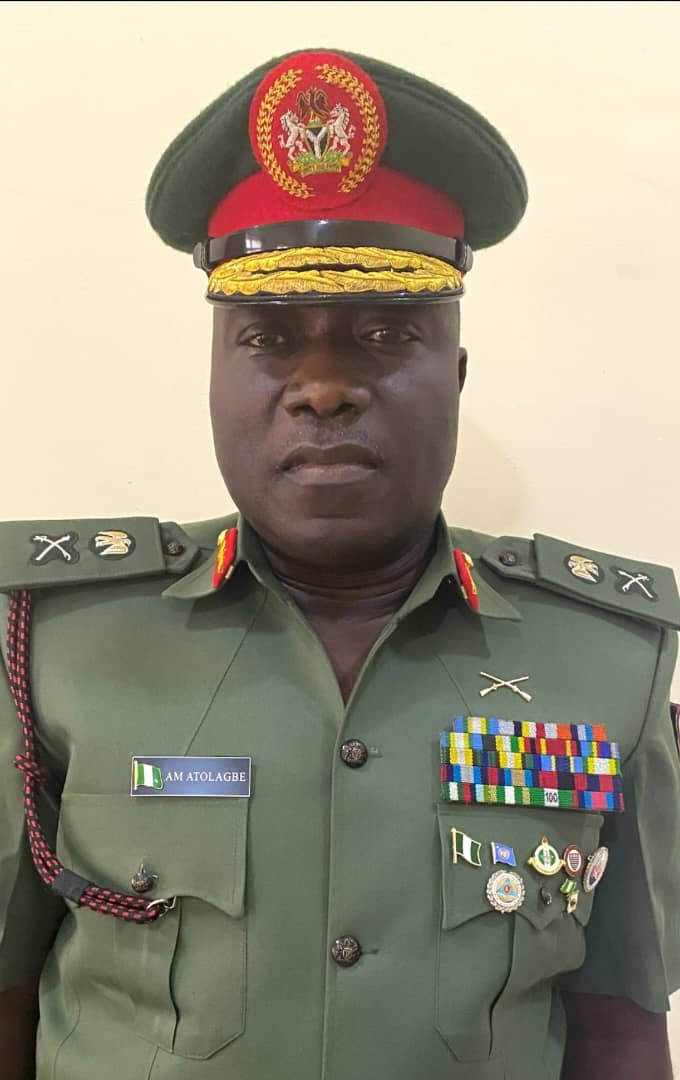
- Born: Anthony Mayowa Atolagbe; 5 January 1965 (age 61); Ekan, Northern Region, Nigeria (now in Kwara State, Nigeria)
- Military career
- Allegiance: Nigeria
- Branch: Nigerian Army
- Service years: 1983–2021
- Rank: Major general
- Commands: Field Commander at Joint Task Force (JTF) Operation Safe Haven; Commander Sector South at UNAMID; Officer Commanding and Acting Commanding Officer NIBATT 21 – ECOMOG; Commanding Officer NIBATT 6 in African Union Mission in Sudan (AMIS)

Anthony Mayowa Atolagbe (born 5 January 1965) is a retired Nigerian army general, military expert and advisor who served as Field Commander of the Task Force Operation for counter terror operations in North Central Nigeria.

== Early life and education ==
Anthony Mayowa Atolagbe was born in Ekan, Kwara State. He had his elementary schooling at St. Michael Primary School in Ekan and then proceeded to St. Anthony's Secondary School in Ilorin for his secondary education. He holds a Bachelor of Arts degree in French from Usman Danfodio University, Sokoto, and an Advance Diploma in Banking and Finance from the University of Ibadan. Atolagbe also holds a master's in strategic management and policy studies from the Nigeria Defence Academy and a master's in international affairs and diplomacy from the Ahmadu Bello University in Zaria. He holds a Certificate in Leadership from Harvard Kennedy School and a Certificate in Management from ABU Zaria.He attended Ecole de Maintien de La Paix Mali and obtained certificates in Consolidation de la Paix and Genre Paix et Sécurité.

== Military career ==
=== Training ===
Atolagbe was admitted to the Nigerian Defence Academy as a member of the 34th Regular Combatant Course and commenced cadet training on 4 July 1983. He was commissioned on 28 June 1986, into the Nigerian Army Infantry Corps and was posted as a platoon commander to the 1 Airmobile Battalion in Port Harcourt, Nigeria. He attended the amphibious course in 1988 at the amphibious training wing of the Nigerian Army School of Infantry (NASI) Annex located in Calabar. He also attended the Young Officers Course at the NASI in Jaji in 1992, and in 1994 he attended the Regimental Signal Officers Course at the Nigerian Army Signals School in Apapa, Lagos. In 1995, he returned from Operation Liberia to attend the Armed Forces' Junior Command and Staff College (AFCSC), and upon completion of the six-month course, he returned to the operation area, Op Liberty. In 1998, he proceeded to the NASI to attend the Company Commanders Course Infantry after which he attended the Command and Staff Course at the AFCSC from 2001 to 2002. In 2010, he was a participant at the Higher Management of National Defence Course at the National Defence College, Nigeria in Abuja, Nigeria.

=== Service with the Nigerian Military ===
From 1986 to 1989, Atolagbe was a platoon commander in the 1 Airmobile Battalion in Port Harcourt, and from 1989 to 1992, he was an officer commanding the 5 Mechanized Battalion in Kano. In 2007, he was Assistant Director Logistics (Technical AFEME) at Defense Headquarters, and in 2010, he was appointed Deputy Director Combat Readiness Department of Army Standards and Evaluation. Between 2010 and 2011, he served as Deputy Chief of Staff and Acting Chief of Staff at Headquarters 81 Division Lagos. Atolagbe was appointed Director of Innovation, Army Transformation and Innovation Centre, of the Nigeria Army between 2012-2013 and then Chief of Staff, Headquarters 1 Division, between 2014 and 2015. He was promoted to a Major General in 2016. He then as Director of Peacekeeping Operations, Defence Department of Training and Operation, Defence Headquarters between 2016 and 2017, Director of Plans Defence Department of Policy Plans and Strategy, Defence Headquarters 2018-2019 and Chief of Defence Department of Policy Plans and Strategy, Defence Headquarters 2020. General Atolagbe served as Field Commander Joint Task Force (CJTF) Operation SAFE HAVEN (Jos) under a joint operations command that included Nigeria's land forces, maritime forces, air force, Nigerian Police, Nigerian Security, and Civil Defense Corps; and Nigerian Prisons deployed across Plateau State, Southern Kaduna in Kaduna State, and two LGAs in Bauchi State.

=== Peace Support Operations ===
General Atolagbe, during the course of his military career, participated in several peacekeeping and support operations in Nigeria and abroad.

In 1997, he was acting Commanding Officer NIBATT21 ECOMOG, and provided security in Central Monrovia for campaigns, elections, and installation of the President Elect, - Charles Taylor. Also as a military observer in MONUSCO, Commanding Officer NIBATT 6 in African Union Mission in Sudan (AMIS) and Chief Planning Officer/ Future Plans and Acting Chief of Staff in United Nations–African Union Mission in Darfur (UNAMID). He was the Force HQ focal point for the implementation processes of the DOHA Document for Peace in Darfur and UNAMID. He also served as Team Leader for the Design of the Operational Concept for the ECOWAS Military Intervention in The Gambia due to ex-President Yahya Jammeh's reluctance to relinquish power and presented at the ECOWAS CDS Meeting in Abuja. He was a military expert for the ECOWAS/AU Review and Lessons Learned Panel of the ECOWAS Mission in AFISMA (Mali) in 2014, which was held in Akosoumbo, Ghana. As a military expert panelist on the issues of logistics for the mission, he discussed the need for the possible deployment of MRAPS in future AU PSO due to the heavy injury casualties suffered by troops in the mission prior to UN recapture.

In 2017, Atolagbe was a member of Nigeria's delegation to the ECOWAS CDS Meetings in Abuja and Accra for the review of mission mandates in Guinea-Bissau and Mali respectively. In these instances, decisions were reached that led to the extension of the mission mandates. Prior to that, he served as Executive Officer and Chief of Staff for the Ceasefire Commission of the United Nations Multidimensional Integrated Stabilization Mission in Mali (MINUSMA) and organized regular meetings of the Ceasefire Commission, mediation, and negotiation among the UN Mission and the parties to the conflict in Ouagadougou and Bamako. Atolagbe has also served as a member of the military experts who designed Articles 5–11 of the Mali Peace Accord in Ouagadougou, which concern ceasefire, cantonment, the constitution of committees, and the Ceasefire Secretariat.

=== Service with the United Nations and African Union ===
General Atolagbe has served in several capacities with the United Nations, African Union, and ECOWAS Peacekeeping Missions. He served as the Commanding Officer of the African Union Mission in Sudan in 2006 and as a United Nations Military Observer—United Nations Mission in the Democratic Republic of Congo in 2000–2001. He was Chief Planning Officer and Acting Chief of Staff for the United Nations-African Union Hybrid Mission in Darfur, Sudan in 2011–2012. He currently serves as a military expert and advisor to the United Nations and the African Union. In 2022, he was part of the UN delegation to the African Union Policy Conference on Promoting the Peace, Security, and Development Nexus in Tangier, Kingdom of Morocco during which he proposed the inclusion of military personnel in future peace, security, and development discourse in order to have a more robust deliberation on the subject matter.

== Awards and recognition ==
- Outstanding Commander of Military Operation in Nigeria and Icon of Human Rights and Conflict Prevention
