= Muhammad Inuwa Idris =

Nigerian Army major general

Major general Muhammad Inuwa Idris

Commandant of the Nigerian Defence Academy
- In office 26 December 2013 – 9 August 2015
- Preceded by: Maj-Gen. E. Onwuamaegbu
- Succeeded by: Maj-Gen. Mohammed Tasiu Ibrahim

Personal details
- Born: 1960 (age 65–66)
- Education: Nigerian Defence Academy; National Defense University; National War College; University of Balochistan

Military service
- Allegiance: Nigeria
- Branch/service: Nigerian Army
- Years of service: 1980–2015
- Rank: Major general

Muhammad Inuwa Idris (born 1960) is a retired Nigerian Army major general who served as the 26th Commandant of the Nigerian Defence Academy (NDA). He was appointed Commandant on 26 December 2013 and succeeded as Commandant by Major General M.T. Ibrahim on 9 August 2015.

== Background and education ==
Idris was enlisted as Officer Cadet at the Nigerian Defence Academy in 1980 and was commissioned as a second lieutenant in 1983. He was posted to the Infantry Corps on commission but was redeployed to the Intelligence Corps.

Maj Gen Idris holds two master's degrees from the US National Defense University (NDU) in Washington DC: the first is Master of Science in National Security Strategy obtained from the National War College while the second is Master of Arts in Strategic Security Studies obtained from the College of International Security Affairs. He also holds a Graduate Certificate in International Counterterrorism from NDU, a bachelor's degree in War Studies from University of Baluchistan, Quetta, Pakistan; and a Postgraduate Diploma, in Diplomatic Studies from the University of Westminster, London, UK.

== Career ==
Prior to becoming Commandant of the NDA, Maj Gen Idris was the Deputy Commandant and Director of Studies of the Nigerian National Defence College. During his time in these roles he implemented reforms in educational doctrine, international partnerships, curricular development, and organisational structure. including His previous assignments include:

- Commandant of the Nigerian Army Intelligence School (NAIS)
- Directing Staff at the National Defence College
- Chief of Staff Nigerian Army Intelligence Corps
- Colonel General Staff Nigerian Army Intelligence Corps
- Military Assistant and Principal General Staff Officer, Office of the National Security Adviser
- Commander Strategic Intelligence Support Group
- Officer Commanding Field Intelligence Detachment
- Deputy Defence Adviser
- Officer Commanding VIP Protection Detachment
- Staff Officer Coordination
- Desk Officer
- Infantry Platoon Commander
