= Mohammed Abba Gana =

Nigerian politician

Federal Capital Territory Minister
- In office 8 February 2001 – 17 July 2003
- Preceded by: Ibrahim Bunu
- Succeeded by: Nasir Ahmad el-Rufai

Personal details
- Born: 1943 (age 82–83) Damboa, Borno State, Nigeria

Mohammed Abba Gana (born 1943) served as a Special Adviser on Civil Society to the Nigerian Vice President Atiku Abubakar until 22 June 2006, when he was sacked by President Olusegun Obasanjo. He had previously served as a Federal Capital Territory Minister from 8 February 2001 to 17 July 2003.

== Biography ==
Gana was born in 1943 in Damboa, Borno State. He attended the Yelwa Boarding Senior Primary School, Maiduguri (1956 - 1958), Government College, Zaria, now Barewa College (1959 - 1963) and Okene-Provincial Secondary School (1964 - 1965). He was admitted to Ahmadu Bello University, Zaria (1966 - 1969) where he obtained a degree in electrical engineering.

He worked as executive engineer in the Ministry of Works and Housing of North-Eastern State. In October 1979 he was appointed Borno State Commissioner for Works and Housing by the Great Nigeria People's Party (GNPP) government of Borno State under Governor Mohammed Goni. In 1983 he was the gubernatorial candidate of the GNPP in Borno State.

For several years he was on the board of the National Electric Power Authority (NEPA).
