= John Michael Ogidi =

Major General John Michael Ogidi
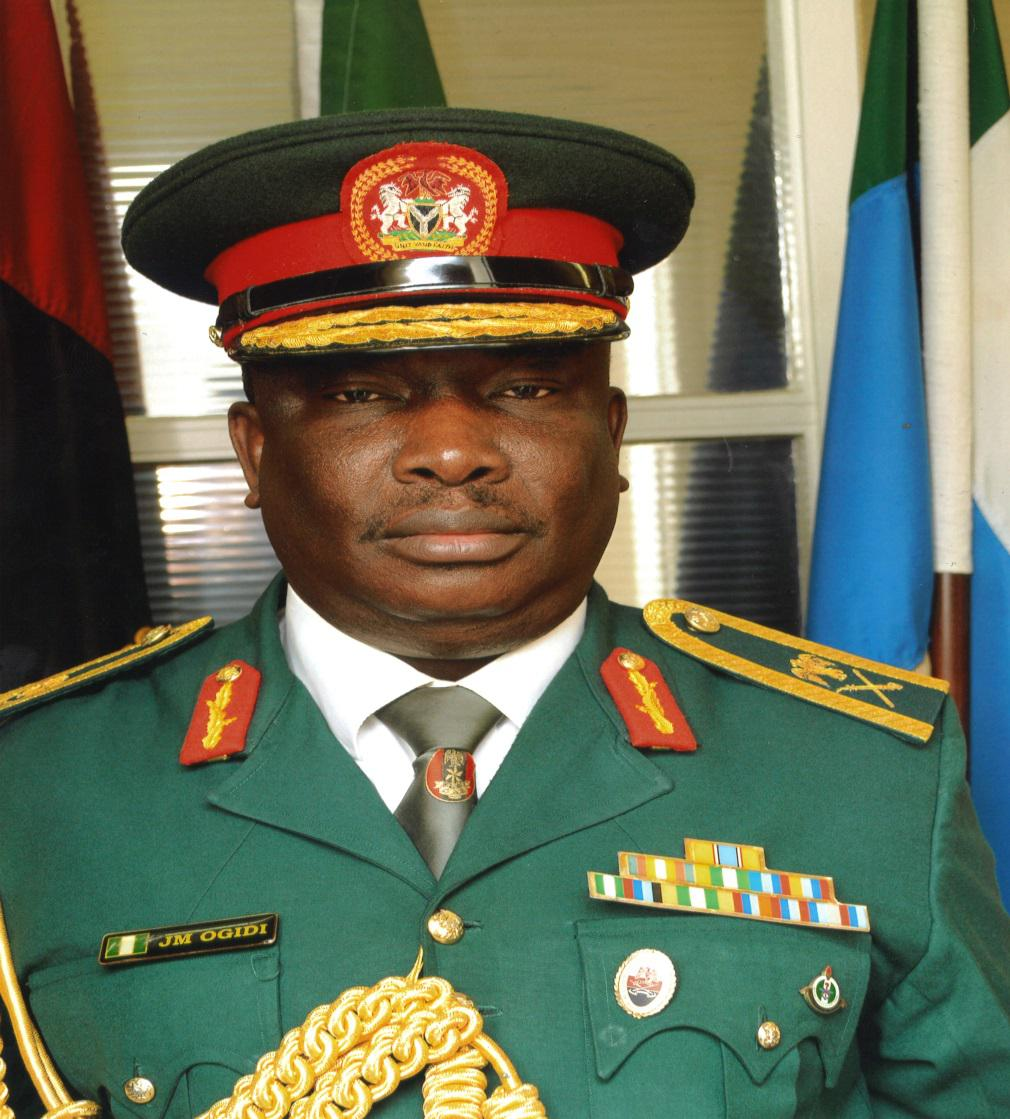
- Major General Ogidi

Commander Corps of Signal (CCS)
- In office March 2015 – July 2015

Personal details
- Born: December 8, 1959 (age 66) Ayibabiri, Bayelsa State
- Spouse: Helen Ogidi
- Awards: Corp Medal of Honor; Forces Service Star; Meritorious Service Star; Distinguished Service Star; Grand Service Star

Military service
- Allegiance: Nigeria
- Branch/service: Nigerian Army
- Years of service: 1982 - 2015
- Rank: Major general
- Battles/wars: Operation liberty (ECOMOG), Liberia; Operation Harmony, Bakassi; UNAVEM IIIAngola Civil war

John Michael Ogidi is a retired Nigerian Army major general. He was Defence Adviser of the Nigeria High Commission in the United Kingdom from March 2012 to March 2015 and until his retirement in July 2015, he was the Commander Corps of Signal Headquarters Nigerian Army Signals.

== Early life and education ==
Ogidi was born on 8 December 1959 in Ayibabiri Bayelsa State, Nigeria. He attended BDGS Yenagoa secondary school from 1973 to 1977 when he attained his school certificate. He was admitted into the Nigerian Defence Academy as a member of the 26 Regular combatant course on 18 June 1979 and was commissioned as a second lieutenant into the corps of the Nigerian Army Signals on 18 December 1982. He obtained a bachelor's degree in Electronic and Telecom engineering from Obafemi Awolowo University(OAU) Ile Ife and a Masters of Science (M.Sc) degree in Strategic Studies from University of Ibadan.

== Military career ==
Major General Ogidi served at different levels in the Nigeria Army. He undertook several courses including the Junior and Senior Staff course at the Armed Forces Command and Staff College, Jaji and National Defence College Course 16 Abuja. He served as the Instructor of Nigeria Army School of Signals Lagos, Commanding Officer of the 541 Brigade Signals, Commander of the 56 Signals Operational command, Commander of the 59 division signals, Deputy Director Electronic Protection Measures (DDEPM) of the department of communications, Commandant of the Nigerian Army School of Signals, the Defence Adviser of the Nigeria high commission London, United Kingdom and Commander of Corps Signals, Nigerian Army Signals.

== Medals and awards ==
He has been the recipient of several medals including OP Liberty (ECOMOG) Medal, OP Harmoney IV (Bakassi) Medal and UNAVEM III (Angola) Medal. He has also received several designations from the Nigerian Army including the Meritorious Service Star (MSS), Force Service Star (FSS), Passed Staff College Dagger (psc(+)) Grand Service Star Award (GSS), Fellow Defence College (FDC), the Distinguished Service Star (DSS) and award of Corps Medal of Honor (CMH).

== Personal life ==
He is married to Helen Ogidi, with whom he has three kids.
