= Emeka Onwuamaegbu =

Major general Chukwuemeka Osita Onwuamaegbu

Commandant of the Nigerian Defence Academy
- In office August 2010 – December 2013
- Preceded by: Maj-Gen. Mamuda Yerima
- Succeeded by: Maj-Gen. Muhammad Inuwa Idris

Personal details
- Born: 1959 (age 66–67)

Military service
- Allegiance: Nigeria
- Branch/service: Nigerian Army
- Rank: Major general

Chukwuemeka "Emeka" Osita Onwuamaegbu (born 1959) is a retired Nigerian Army major general who served as the 25th commandant of the Nigerian Defence Academy from 2010 to 2013.

== Early life ==
Major General Onwuamaegbu is the son of Honourable Justice Obumneme G. Onwuamaegbu, who was the attorney-general and commissioner of justice of East Central State between October 1, 1972 - July 29, 1975. General Onwuamaegbu is also the nephew of the Nigerian journalist and writer Joseph N. C. Egemonye.

== Military career ==
He was admitted to the Nigerian Defence Academy on 3 January 1977 as a member of the 21st Regular Combatant Course where he was coursemates with officers such as Alex Sabundu Badeh and Babagana Monguno. He was commissioned a Second lieutenant on 3 July 1979.

He was promoted to major general in 2009. Prior to commanding the Defence Academy, he served as commandant of the Nigerian Army Peacekeeping Center, Jaji and was director of Army Public Relations. He carried out major innovations in the Defence Academy.
