= Mohammed Balarabe Haladu =

Nigerian Army lieutenant

Lieutenant general Mohammed Balarabe Haladu

Commandant of the Nigerian Defence Academy
- In office January 1993 – 1994
- Preceded by: Lt-Gen. Aliyu Mohammed Gusau
- Succeeded by: Air Marshal Al-Amin Daggash

Personal details
- Born: 1944 Kano, Nigeria
- Died: 28 June 1998 (aged 53–54)

Military service
- Allegiance: Nigeria
- Branch/service: Nigerian Army
- Rank: Lieutenant general

Mohammed Balarabe Haladu (1944 – 28 June 1998) was a Nigerian Army Lieutenant general who served as the Commandant of the Nigerian Defence Academy from 1993 to 1994. He was also a former federal Minister for Industry.

Born in Kano, Haladu had his military training in Nigeria Military School, Zaria, Pakistan Military Academy and University College of Wales.
