= Ibrahim Bunu =

Nigerian politician

Federal Capital Territory Minister
- In office 29 May 1999 – February 2001
- Preceded by: Mamman Kontagora
- Succeeded by: Mohammed Abba Gana

Personal details
- Born: December 25, 1950 (age 75) Ngala, Borno State, Nigeria

Ibrahim Bunu is a Nigerian architect and Minister of the Federal Capital territory (FCT), Nigeria at the start of the Nigerian Fourth Republic, holding office from May 1999 until February 2001 in the cabinet of President Olusegun Obasanjo. He was replaced by Engineer Mohammed Abba Gana, also of Borno State, in a cabinet reshuffle in February 2001.

== Biography ==
Bunu was born on 25 December 1950 in Ngala, Borno State. In 1982 he was appointed Minister of State, Housing and Environment. Bunu designed the Nigerian National Petroleum Corporation (NNPC) Towers in Abuja.

In April 2008 the Senate Committee on the Federal Capital Territory (FCT) summoned Bunu and other former FCT ministers to defend their actions with respect to land allocations, revocations and sale of Federal Government houses during their tenure.

In March 2010 President Goodluck Jonathan set up a Federal Projects Assessment Committee headed by Bunu "to assess and provide necessary information on the status of on-going Federal Government projects across the nation." Bunu immediately came under pressure to explain how he could probe "ongoing projects" that started during his administration of the FCT.
