= Harris Dzarma =

Major general Harris Musa Dzarma

Commandant of the Nigerian Defence Academy
- In office 2006 – August 2008 Adamawa State
- Preceded by: Lt-Gen. Abel Akale
- Succeeded by: Maj-Gen. Mamuda Yerima

Personal details
- Born: 1952 (age 73–74)

Military service
- Allegiance: Nigeria
- Branch/service: Nigerian Army
- Rank: Major general

Harris Musa Dzarma (born 1952) is a retired Nigerian Army major general who served as the 23rd Commandant of the Nigerian Defence Academy from 2006 to 2008 where he was considered one of the commandants to have served in the academy since its establishment in 1964 to replace the Nigeria Military Training College.

He enrolled at the Nigerian Defence Academy in 1973 as a member of the 14 Regular Combatant Course where he was coursemates with Lt-Gen Luka Yusuf and ACM Paul Dike.

He was replaced as Commandant in August 2008.
