= Salihu Zaway Uba =

Nigerian Army general

- Allegiance: Nigeria
- Service / branch: Nigerian Army
- Rank: Major general

Major General Salihu Zaway Uba is a retired Nigerian Army officer. He was a Force Commander of the United Nations Mission in Liberia. Prior to this appointment on 9 January 2015 by United Nations Secretary-General Ban Ki-moon, he served as a Commander within the Nigerian Army.

== Career ==
He studied at the University of Ibadan, Imo State University and the National Open University in Nigeria and holds master's degrees in Strategic Studies, Business Administration and Peace and Conflict. He is also a graduate of the War College in Nigeria. He began his career in 1979. He served in various capacities of command, and eventually served in peacekeeping roles and under the ECOWAS Monitoring Group and UNMIL. He was the last Force Commander UNMIL Prior to his appointment and up until 2013, he was commander of TRADOC as well as head of the Army Peacekeeping Center. He also was appointed Director of Veteran's Affairs within the Nigerian Ministry of Defence. He has also held several high-level positions with United Nations Peacekeeping Missions. He retired in April 2018.

== Awards ==
Uba is a recipient of several medals and awards which include:

- General Service Star
- Field Command Medal of Honour
- Training Support Medal
- General Operations Medal
- Distinguished Service Order of the Republic of Liberia
- Nigeria Commendation Medal
