= Nigerian Army Infantry Corps =

- Active: 1958-Present
- Country: Nigeria
- Branch: Nigerian Army
- Type: Infantry
- Role: Infantry
- Garrison/HQ: Jaji, Nigeria
- Mottos: Courage, Dedication & Sacrifice

Commanders
- Notable commanders: Mamman Jiya Vatsa

The Nigerian Army Infantry Corps is the infantry corps of the Nigerian Army and includes regular and reserve force regiments. The unit's headquarters are at Jaji, Nigeria. The Corps is headed by the Commander, Infantry Corps Center (ICC).

== History ==
It came into being in April 1958 when some Nigerians and British instructors were moved from the West Africa Command Training School at Teshie in the Gold Coast (now Ghana) to Dalet Barracks in Kawo, Kaduna. The barracks was used by the Nigeria Regiment and the unit became the Nigerian Military Forces Training College (NMFTC).

== Structure ==
=== Infantry Corps Centre ===
The Infantry Corps Centre (ICC) is a unit of the corps, administered by the Nigerian Army School of Infantry and responsible for the basic training and advanced training of soldiers and officers joining the infantry.

=== School of Infantry ===
The Nigerian Army School of Infantry (NASI) is a unit of the corps, responsible for the basic training and advanced training of soldiers and officers joining the infantry. It is part of the Training and Doctrine Command (TRADOC). The School of Infantry's Nature Conservation Education Centre. The NASI Conservation Education Centre was established with the aim of creating awareness about conservation among troops and families of soldiers within the Jaji Military Cantonment. Notable alumni include: Anthony Atolagbe, Ibrahim Attahiru, Faruk Yahaya, and Akintunde Akinsehinwa. NASI was the largest single-service school.

In 2024, 29 Infantry Corps Generals — 19 Major Generals and 10 Brigadier Generals — were officially retired.

== Commanders ==
- Major Gen OO Oluyede (since 16 July 2023)
- Major Gen FS Etim (since January 2025)

== See also ==
- Recruit training
- Infantry Training Centre (British Army)
