= Damboa massacre =

2014 massacre in Nigeria

On 4 July 2014, jihadist group Boko Haram attacked Damboa, Borno State, northeastern Nigeria. The Nigerian Army said that they fought off the insurgents, but locals said that the Army abandoned its barracks there and left the town as a result.

On 18 July 2014, Boko Haram again attacked Damboa. The Army had left; the self-defence militia were quickly overpowered by Boko Haram, who took over the town - killing over 100 people and burning most of it.
