= Chibok ambush =

Attack by Boko Haram on Nigerian Army

- Part of the Boko Haram insurgency
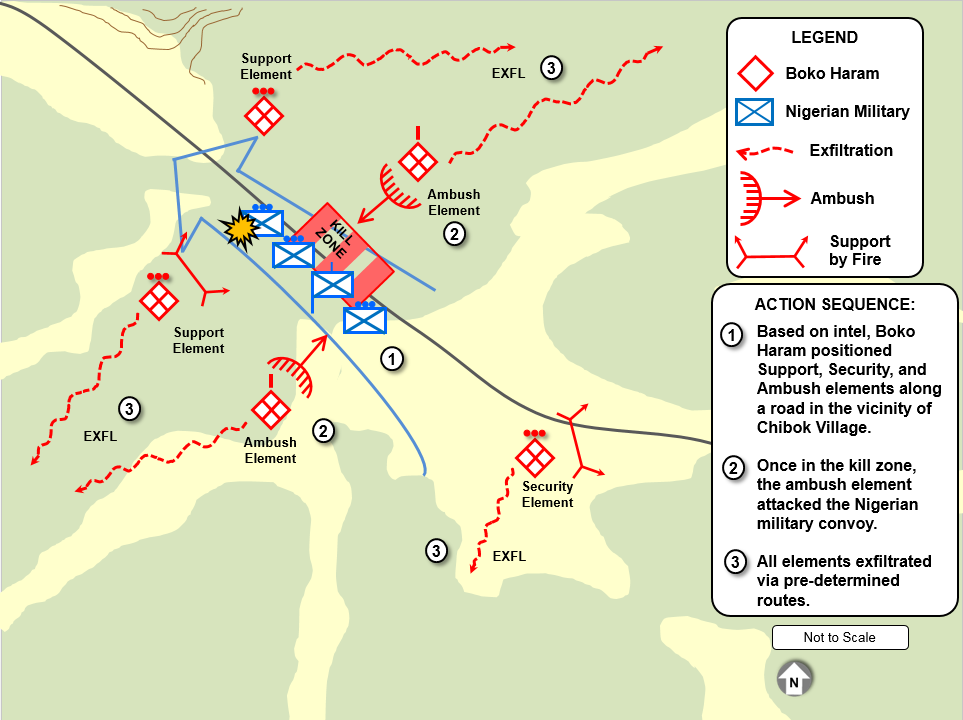
- United States Army map showing the ambush
Date	13–14 May 2014
Location	Near Chibok in Borno State, Nigeria
Result	Boko Haram victory: Mutiny of Nigerian Army soldiers at Maiduguri

Belligerents
Boko Haram	Nigeria

Commanders and leaders
Unknown	(Nigeria) Maj. Olalekan Akintola ("Lokoso") †

Units involved
Unknown	Nigerian Army: Elements of the 7th Division

Casualties and losses
Several killed (gov. claim)	12 killed, several wounded

The Chibok ambush was an attack of Boko Haram insurgents against a Nigerian Army convoy in the night from 13 to 14 May 2014, as the latter was searching for schoolgirls who had been kidnapped by the Islamist rebels. Even though the Nigerian Army forces managed to extricate themselves from the ambush, the attack seriously affected the morale of the involved soldiers who felt that their leadership was carelessly sacrificing them in the war against the insurgents. As result, elements of the Nigerian Army's 7th Division subsequently mutinied at Maiduguri and almost killed their own commander, "humiliat[ing] the Nigerian military".

== Background ==
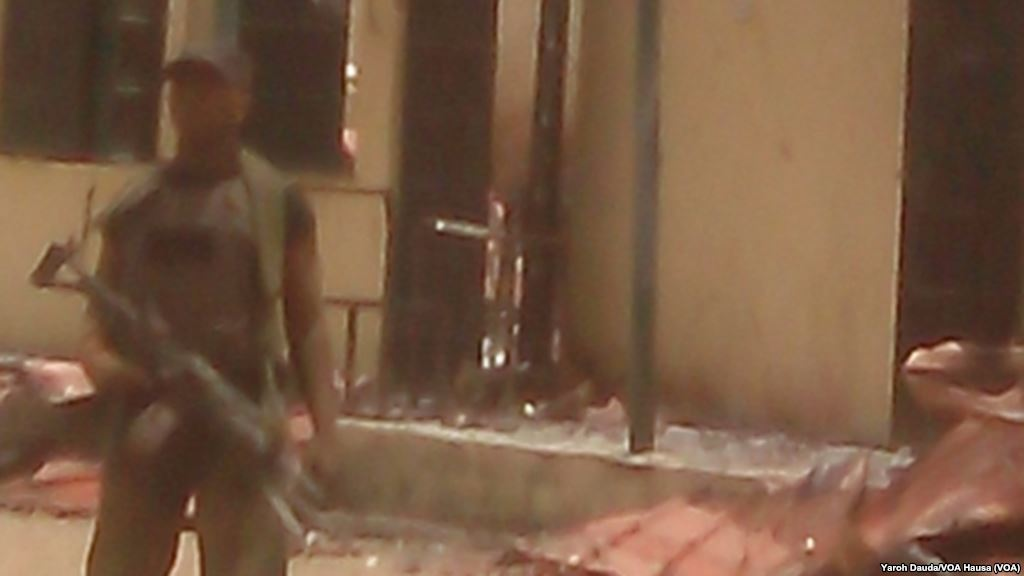
A Nigerian Army soldier at the destroyed school of Chibok after the kidnapping of 14 April 2014

The Salafi jihadist Boko Haram movement launched an insurgency against the Nigerian government following an unsuccessful uprising in 2009. Supported by several other Jihadist groups such as al-Qaeda, the group uses raids, assaults, and ambushes to terrorize its civilian opponents and destabilize the government with the ultimate goal of establishing an Islamic state in northern Nigeria. Boko Haram considers all "Western or secular ideas [...] heretical and worthy of attack", and thus often targets Western-influenced schools. Its most infamous attack in this regard was the abduction of 276 female students in Chibok on 14 April 2014.

Due to numerous problems affecting the Nigerian Armed Forces, including rampant corruption among its leadership, the Nigerian Army has found it extremely difficult to adapt to Boko Haram's guerilla warfare and defeat the insurgency. In response to the Chibok kidnapping, the Nigerian military intensified its counter-insurgency campaign in Borno State, but enjoyed little success. Often lacking even basic necessities, such as weapons, ammunition, pay, and food, the soldiers involved in these operations became increasingly dissatisfied and demoralized over time. Believing that they were being "killed like rats by the insurgents", they felt left alone or even betrayed by their commanders.

== Ambush ==
On early 13 May 2014, pro-government militias from three villages in the Kala/Balge area repelled a major Boko Haram raid, allegedly killing up to 200 insurgents, as well as capturing some fighters and military equipment. Upon learning of this, the Nigerian Army's 7th Division sent some of its forces from Maiduguri to Kala/Balge on a "special operation". The soldiers gathered some of the captured Boko Haram materiel from the locals, who relayed to them "misleading", "faulty and unverified information" about the possible location of the kidnapped schoolgirls from Chibok. Upon learning of this, the general officer commanding the 7th Division, Major General Ahmadu Mohammed, promptly ordered the soldiers in the field to either to return to their base at Maiduguri or to conduct a patrol to search for the abductees.

The ambush occurred near Chibok, on the road to Maiduguri

By then, the 7th Division troops in question were in Chibok and protested against this order, as this would force them to move through the wilderness at night, exposing them to possible Boko Haram attacks. They pleaded with their officers to spend the night at one of the villages. The commanders in the field consequently called Major General Ahmadu Mohammed for permission to do so, but were overruled. Told that "the top ranks at the headquarters of the 7 Division would not be pleased if they don't go back to Maiduguri that night", the 7th Division forces then started to advance along the road to Maiduguri. Boko Haram had received intel about the Nigerian Army convoy, however, and prepared an ambush near Chibok.

Several Boko Haram fighters hid on either side of the road, while others formed support and security units; the former were supposed to aid the attack on the Nigerian Army convoy, while the latter ensured that the ambushing fighters were not surprised by possible government reinforcements. The insurgents waited until the military convoy had entered the kill zone, whereupon they launched their assault. Several soldiers were killed or wounded until the Nigerian Army troops managed to break through. The insurgents then retreated via planned routes, while the convoy continued to travel to Maiduguri. The Nigerian military initially claimed that only four soldiers had been killed, but independent sources confirmed that 12 had been killed and numerous others wounded. One of the dead was a commanding officer, Major Olalekan Akintola. According to the government, several attackers had also been killed during the fighting.

== Aftermath ==
Though the Nigerian soldiers had managed to overcome the ambush, the Boko Haram assault had serious repercussions for the 7th Division's morale, which had already been low. Since this insurgent attack had happened just as they had feared, the surviving troops blamed Major General Ahmadu Mohammed for carelessly ordering them to move at night and for having needlessly sacrificed their comrades. When the convoy arrived at Maiduguri, word about the events quickly spread and anger mounted among the entire 7th Division.

When Ahmadu Mohammed came to Maiduguri to pay respect to the fallen soldiers and address his forces, the situation escalated. Outraged, several soldiers started to fire into the air or threw stones at the major general's car. Eventually, some of those who had survived the ambush even shot at the commander, barely missing him. Some of Ahmadu Mohammed's bodyguards were hit and wounded. The situation was later brought back under control, and 18 soldiers were arrested and court-martialed. Charged for "mutiny, criminal conspiracy, attempted murder, disobeying orders, insubordination and false accusation", all pleaded not guilty. Five were discharged from the army, one was sentenced to hard labor, and 12 were sentenced to death for trying to murder Ahmadu Mohammed and inciting mutiny.

The ambush near Chibok and subsequent mutiny at Maiduguri received international attention and "humiliated the Nigerian military". The incident was judged to be "a big blow at a time when the nation is rallying behind the military to rescue the abducted schoolgirls". Major General Ahmadu Mohammed was subsequently replaced by General M. Y. Ibrahim as GOC of the 7th Division. Nevertheless, the situation for the soldiers in the campaign against Boko Haram did not markedly improve. As result, 7th Division soldiers in Maiduguri again mutinied just three months after the Chibok ambush.
