= Oluwole Adeosun =

Nigerian banker and public servant (1938–2012)

Oluwole Alani Adeosun
- Born: Oluwole Alani Adeosun; 1938; Abeokuta, Ogun State, Nigeria
- Died: 2012 (aged 73–74)
- Occupations: Banker, accountant and public servant
- Known for: Managing Director of First Bank of Nigeria and Chief Executive Officer of NAL Merchant Bank

Oluwole Alani Adeosun (1938–2012) was a Nigerian banker, accountant and public servant. He was chief executive officer of NAL Merchant Bank from 1979 to 1987 before becoming managing director and chief executive officer of First Bank of Nigeria between 1987 and 1990.

In 1993, he was appointed Secretary of Transport in the Transitional National Government of Nigeria headed by Ernest Shonekan.

Adeosun also played significant roles in Nigeria's indigenisation programme and in leadership positions within the Institute of Chartered Accountants of Nigeria (ICAN), the Lagos Chamber of Commerce and Industry, and the Anglican community in Abeokuta and Lagos.

== Early life and education ==
Adeosun was born in Abeokuta and was of Egba heritage. He attended Abeokuta Grammar School before joining the Western Region Ministry of Agriculture and Natural Resources in Ibadan in 1959 as an agricultural assistant trainee. He later received a scholarship to study in the United Kingdom, attending Holborn College before earning a degree in economics from the University of Bradford in 1967.

He subsequently joined Coopers & Lybrand in London and qualified as a chartered accountant in 1970. Following his transfer to the firm's Lagos office in 1971, he participated in the audit team responsible for Nigeria's decimal currency conversion.

== Career ==
In 1973, Adeosun joined NAL Merchant Bank as an investment executive. He worked on company valuations relating to listings on the Nigerian Stock Exchange and transactions reviewed by the Securities and Exchange Commission (Nigeria), then known as the Capital Issues Commission.

In 1975, he chaired an industrial enterprises panel established to review the implementation of the Nigerian Enterprises Promotion Decree. The panel recommended amendments aimed at increasing Nigerian participation in the ownership and control of businesses operating in the country.

He was appointed CEO of NAL in 1979. In 1987, he became managing director of First Bank.
