= Musa Daggash =

Nigerian civil servant

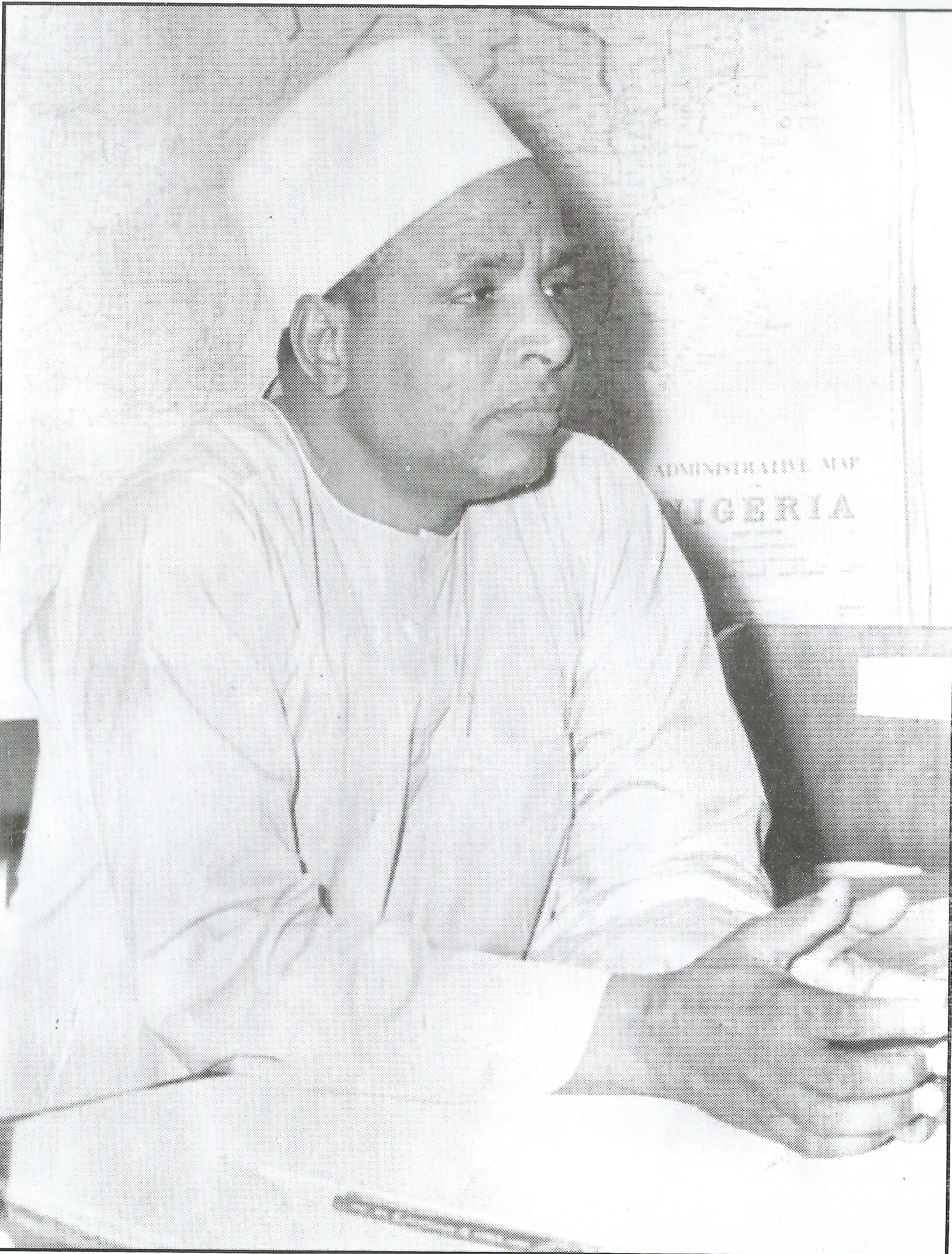
Musa Daggash

Musa Daggash, OFR (born Musa Jibrin Muhammad Al-amin) was a Nigerian civil servant, who served as Permanent Secretary for the Ministry of Mines and Power, then the Ministry of Defence and finally the Ministry of Transport. Daggash was part of the cohort of civil servants referred to as Super Permanent Secretaries. From 15 January 1966 to 3 June 1967, Nigeria had no Ministers, that was a period of over fifteen months. The two military regimes of Major General Aguiyi Ironsi and General Yakubu Gowon made permanent secretaries members of their Federal Executive Councils. These individuals were later referred to as "Super Permanent Secretaries".

Daggash was part of the first group of Northerners who were transferred to the Federal Public Service during the so-called Nigerianisation policy pursued by the Federal Government in the 1950s. He retired from the civil service on 26 March 1969. Daggash was appointed as the chairman of the Corporations Standing Tenders Board in the same year by Gen. Yakubu Gowon. Daggash was appointed as the first Nigerian to chair the Board of Barclays Bank (now Union Bank of Nigeria), from 1973 to 1976. He became the first General Manager of the Chad Basin Development Authority in 1973. He also served as Chairman of the Borno State Local Government Service Commission, Public Complaints Commission and Borno State Civil Service Commission.

== Early life and education ==
Musa Daggash was born about 1918 at Kirenowa, Marte local government area of Borno State to Jibrin Muhammad Al-amin and Habibata Jidda, he was of the Shuwa Arab ethnic stock. His paternal grandfather, Mu'allim Al-amin was a well to do farmer and cattle rearer. Mu'allim Al-amin owned several slaves who worked on the farms, slaves were a major asset to a farming family especially in pre-colonial Borno. Daggash was the third of nine children, Musa grew up in a traditional Shuwa Arab home, his parents imparted in him the fundamentals of Islamic training received by a child in a traditional Muslim society.

In 1924 the senior superintendent of education Mr. S.L. Price arrived Kirenowa with the aim of enrolling a set of pupils in the provincial school. By virtue of being one of those with children, Jibrin (Musa's father) was told to bring a child from his household for enrolment. Musa was admitted and registered to the Maiduguri Provincial School on 3 May 1924. Having passed through the travails of the Provincial Primary School, Musa proceeded to Borno Middle School in 1930. Musa was among the five Borno Middle School pupils admitted into Katsina Higher College in 1934.

In 1937 after completing Katsina Higher College, Musa and five of his colleagues were selected for training in forestry. Musa Daggash and his colleagues were thus registered as the first set of forestry students at the Samaru Agricultural School on 1 May 1938. During the second part of his technical training, Musa was attached to the Kano-Katsina Desiccation Survey, situated at Katsina. He was placed on a salary of £36 per annum. A month after starting work in katsina, he accompanied Messers W.A. Fairbairn and Ian W.G. Cameron on a fact-finding journey to Agades, Tahaoua and Sokoto. Musa later mentioned that the reason for the trip was a publication in 1937, which indicated that the Sahara Desert was encroaching, the author of the publication was Professor Stebbing of Edinburgh University.

In 1950 Musa was nominated to attend a course at the imperial Forestry Institute (now the Department of Plant Sciences) University of Oxford. On 2 March 1950 Musa was interviewed by the Departmental Selection Board, and upon the Board's strong recommendation a more Central Board screened him again. Musa's admission to this prestigious institution of learning was approved by the end of July 1950. Daggash arrived in the United Kingdom on 14 September 1950, in good time to attend the Colonial Office Summer School, Pembroke College in the University of Cambridge from 18 to 28 September. Daggash completed his studies at oxford and returned to work in November 1951.

Later, in 1960 Daggash decided to pursue a diploma in Public Administration from the University of Manchester, in order to equip himself for a career in Administration. He enrolled in the Department of Overseas Administration at The University of Manchester which was just established in 1960, to run short courses in public administration to civil servants from newly independent former colonies.

== Forestry career ==
Having been a technical forester-trainee for two years after leaving college, Musa was promoted to the rank of Forest Assistant III on 1 April 1940 at the rate of £42 per annum. In September 1941, he was transferred from Katsina to Kano province. Daggash was later transferred to Jos and later Yola, where he started a Forest Department from scratch because the area never had a forester before him. He succeeded in establishing a viable Forestry Department, he introduced the eucalyptus tree to the Mambilla Plateau. In 1946 Musa was awarded an offer of scholarship for intermediate Forest Supervisor's course at Ibadan Forest School. The training at Ibadan earned him promotion to Forest Assistant I on 1 July 1947 with remunerative annual pay of £152.

Daggash was posted to Borno (his home state) in early 1949, where he took charge of forestry in Bornu Province. It was probably in the area of neem planting that Musa Daggash left a lasting mark on Borno within his brief stay in 1949–1950. Some 43,000 neem trees were planted in Maiduguri alone and another 100,000 in other parts of the Province under his supervision.

During his time in Borno, Musa used to spend a lot of time in the company of his good friend, Mallam Sheriff Musa. Mallam Sheriff was less enthusiastic to allow his children to be enrolled in the Western-type school, Daggash, however felt that he would be doing disservice to his friend and his young ones to just leave them like that. Musa decided to take the bull by the horn, he waited for an opportune moment when his friend was out of town, he took Mallam Sheriff's son Bunu and some other boys to Maiduguri Primary School and had them registered. Upon Sheriff's return he concealed his displeasure because of the mutual trust between him and Daggash, he consequently accepted the situation. Sheriff's son Bunu Sheriff Musa later became Nigeria's ambassador to France and a Minister of the federal republic.

In February 1953 Alhaji Musa Daggash was invited by the Lieutenant-Governor of Northern Nigeria Sir Bryan Sharwood-smith, to accompany him to Maiduguri, in order to act as his interpreter. The ad hoc visit was due to reports of large scale corruption that was taking place in the native authority administration. Since the Shehu spoke neither English nor Hausa, Sir Bryan requested for a competent but non-partisan interpreter, Daggash was the perfect candidate for the colonial authorities in Kaduna, although a Shuwa Arab by tribe he was very fluent in both Kanuri and English. Daggash, after arriving in Kaduna was allowed to view the Borno file, the Lt.-Governor informed him that if the situation was as bad as it was in the file then even the Shehu if found guilty Should not be spared.

== Years in Federal Service ==
The Nigerianisation exercise of 1959 was in preparation for independence, Nigerians were upgraded to important positions in the civil service, so they could take over from the departing expatriate staff. Daggash was transferred from the Northern Region Service to the Federal Civil Service, he also made a switch from Forestry to administration in the same feat. He assumed duty as an Administrative Officer II(Supernumerary) on 2 January 1960 in Lagos.

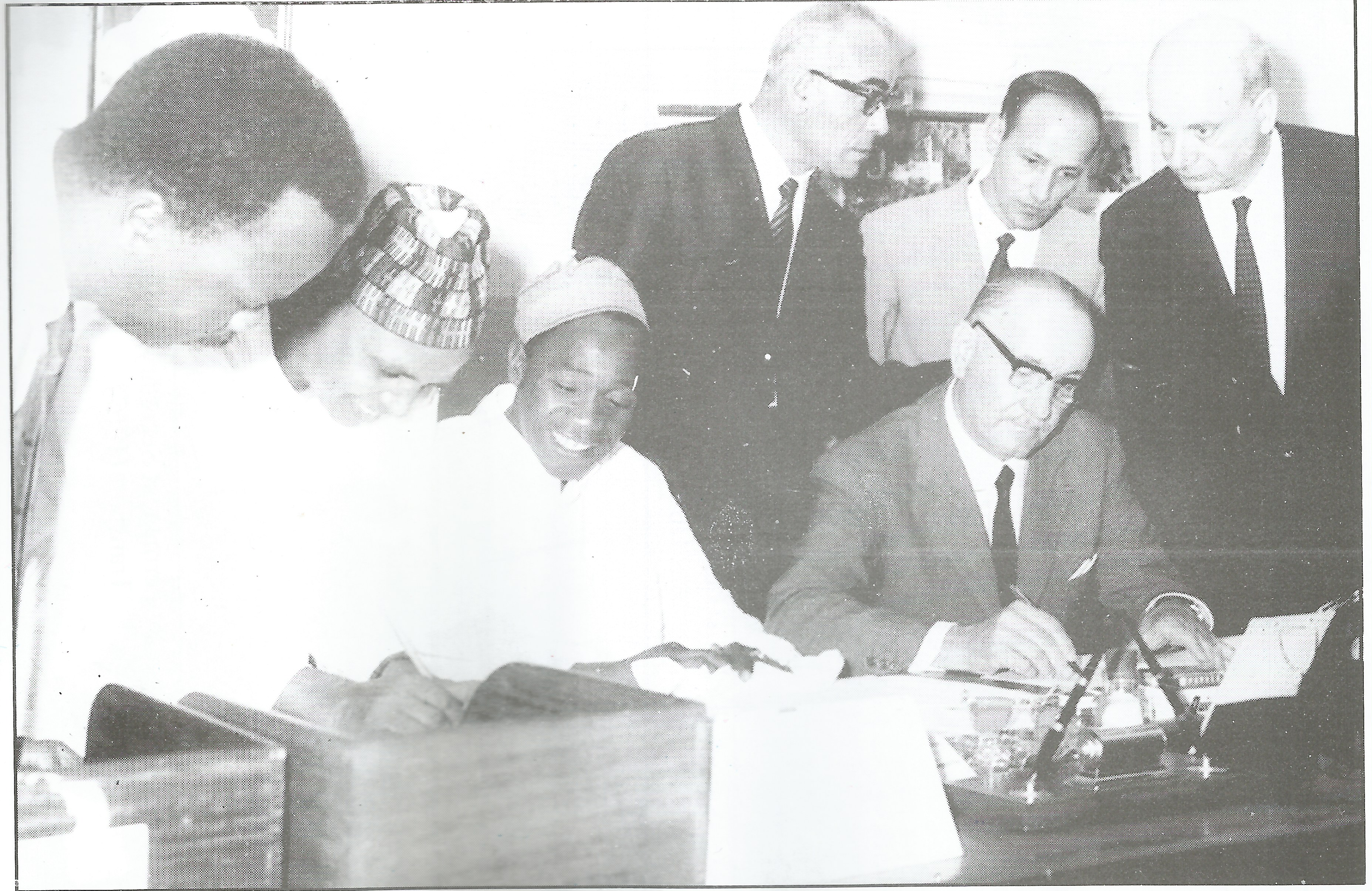
Musa Daggash (Permanent Secretary, Ministry of Mines and Power, second from the left) signing a petroleum exploration agreement with officials of Agip Petroleum Company, while the MinisterYusuf Maitama Sule looks on (April 1963)

Some Lagosians could not believe their eyes, because they had never thought that a Northerner could even understand the English language, let alone occupy a senior position in administration only recently occupied by a white man. By 26 May 1960, Musa earned his promotion to the position of Senior Assistant Secretary in the Ministry of Works. After his return from studies in Britain in 1961, Daggash was promoted to the rank of Acting Deputy Permanent Secretary on 30 October 1961. He was promoted to Permanent Secretary on 1 October 1962 and transferred to the Ministry of Mines and Power.

When Daggash was transferred to the Ministry of Mines and Power, he served alongside Minister Alhaji Maitama Sule (Dan Masanin Kano).During their three-and-a-half-year tenure together, the ministry implemented several key infrastructure and energy projects aligned with Nigeria's economic and national development objectives.

The duo played crucial roles in making Nigeria a successful Oil Producing nation. The Minister, Alhaji Maitama Sule was quoted to have said that "the dedication, selfless service and honesty of Alhaji Musa Daggash, Chief Menshack O. Feyide, Mr Ezekiel Ifaturoti and Mr Gaskell (British) contributed tremendously in the foundation of Nigeria's Petroleum Industry as we know it today." Nigeria's first oil refinery was completed and commissioned under the Maitama Sule and Daggash stewardship in November 1965.

On 22 February 1966 after the first coup d'état, Mr. S. Olabode Wey (Secretary to the Federal Military Government) phoned to inform Musa Daggash that the Head of State and Supreme Commander had directed that he should Move to the Ministry of Defence still as Permanent Secretary. Daggash was later transferred to the Ministry of Transport where he retired from the Civil Service.

== Events of 1966 Coup and Counter-coup ==
On Saturday 15 January 1966 Musa Daggash having finished his morning routine and oblivious of the events that had taken place in the early hours of the day, he headed for his office in order to continue working on some files. On his way he passed by Dodan Barracks where he met Major General Aguiyi Iironsi and some soldiers, he identified himself to them and told them where he was going. Upon hearing this Gen. Ironsi burst into laughter and told Daggash in Hausa "Ka tafi gida ba aiki" (go home, there is no work). This encounter was the reason Gen. Ironsi transferred Daggash to the Ministry of Defence, Ironsi later told Daggash that "I want you to come and work with me; because when everyone was running away you were going to work".

After the then head of State was assassinated during the Ibadan Mutiny on 29 July 1966 and the apparent inability and hesitation of Brigadier Ogundipe (the next most senior military officer) to assume the mantle of leadership, everything revolved around the Ministry of Defence and inevitably around Daggash as the Permanent Secretary.

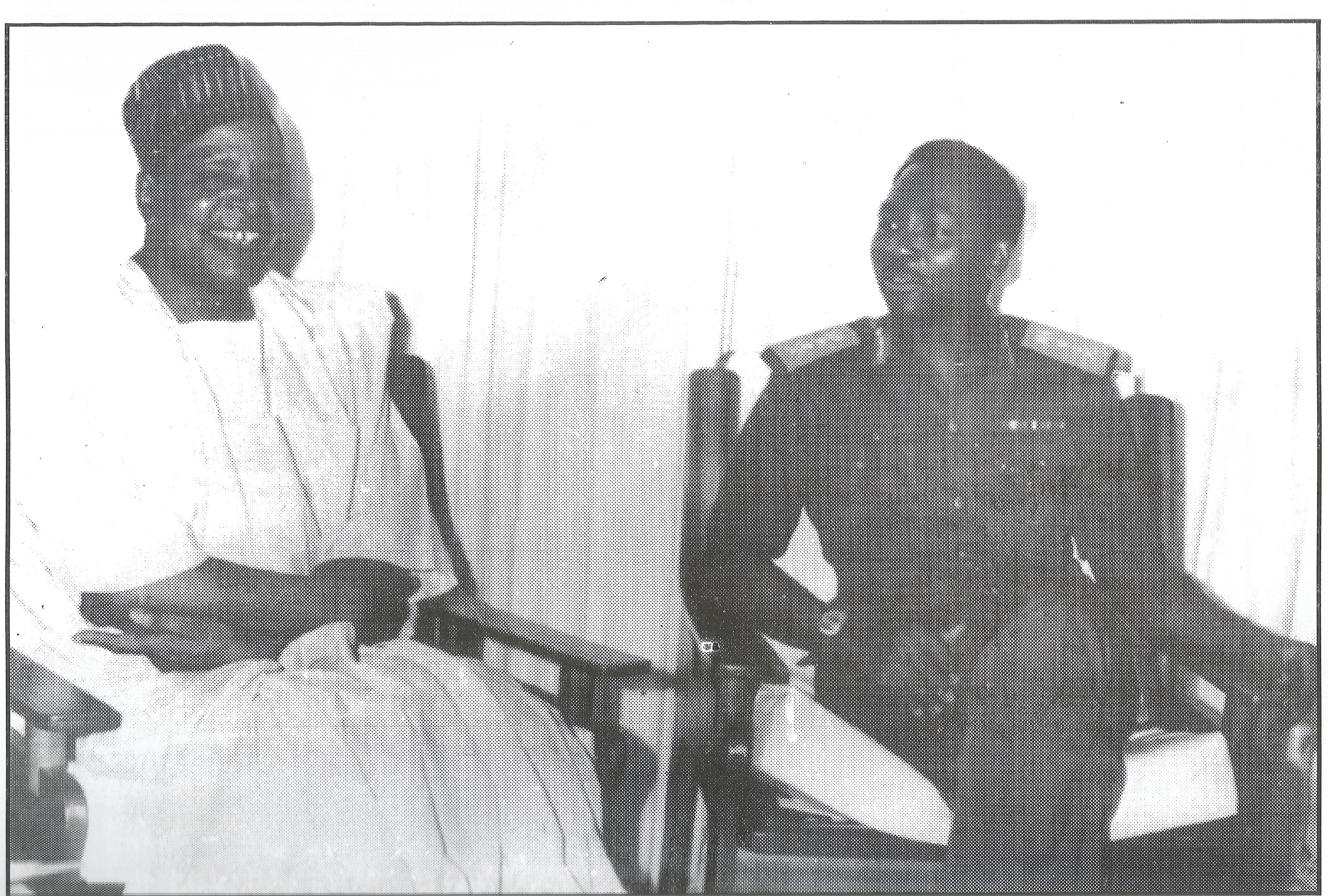
Musa Daggash with General Yakubu Gowon during a visit by the former to the State House (Lagos) in 1974

Daggash's position in the Ministry of Defence gave him some authority and access, which no civil servant had at that critical period in history. It was because of this critical role assumed by Daggash during this period that Mr. H.A Ejueyitchie (later Secretary to the Federal Military Government) jokingly used to say "Musa was Head of State for three days."

Considering the state of confusion in the country the Federal civil Servants decided to hold a meeting with the top military officers, to reiterate that the survival of Nigeria as one indivisible country was paramount. Daggash in the company of other top civil servants met Lt-Colonel Gowon and his colleagues in Ikeja Barracks. A huge debate ensued between the junior Northern officers who wanted "Araba" (Secession), the senior Northern officers, who wanted revenge against the Igbos and the technocrat civil servants who argued for peace and were against the dissolution of the Federation. The debate continued to rage on for hours, while the country drifted dangerously in a power vacuum without a Head of State. The civil servants managed to explain to the military officers how counter-productive and futile their propositions were, so after three days of extensive talks the soldiers agreed to drop their plans to secede and Lt. Colonel Gowon emerged as Head of State.
