= 7th Division (Nigeria) =

Nigerian army division

7 Division
- Insignia
- Active: 2013–present
- Country: Nigeria
- Branch: Army
- Type: Infantry Division
- Role: Combat support
- Size: Division
- Part of: Nigerian Army
- Garrison/HQ: Maiduguri, Nigeria
- Website: army.mil.ng

Commanders
- General Officer Commanding: Major General Abubakar Haruna
- Notable commanders: Lieutenant General Lamidi Adeosun; Major General Ibrahim Yusuf; Major General Abdul Khalifa Ibrahim; Major General Abdulsalam Abubakar

The 7th Division is an infantry unit of the Nigerian Army.

== History ==
The 7th Division (also known as JTF-RO) was established in August 2013 for the war against Boko Haram. The creation of the new division brought to six the number of divisions. The 7th division is headquartered in Maiduguri. The division includes a combat motorcycle unit as part of its 25th Task Force Brigade. The purpose of this unit is stated as securing roads in Yobe and serving as a force multiplier in combat operations.

In 2014, the 7th Division mutinied after having suffered heavy losses during the Chibok ambush.

== Commanders ==
- Major General Obida T. Ethan (22 August 2013 – 1 January 2014)
- Major General Unsaid Bindawa (1 January 2014 – 24 February 2014)
- Major General Ahmadu Mohammed (24 February 2014 – 16 May 2014)
- Brigadier General M. Y. Ibrahim (16 May 2014 – 2015)
- Major General Lamidi Adeosun (2015 – 4 January 2016)
- Brigadier General Victor Ezugwu (4 January 2016 – 17 May 2017)
- Major General Ibrahim Yusuf (17 May 2017 – 25 May 2018)
- Major General Abdulmalik Biu (25 May 2018 – 25 August 2019)
- Major General Abdul Khalifa Ibrahim (25 August 2019 – 15 March 2021)
- Major General Abdulwahab Adelokun Eyitayo (15 March 2021 – 21 January 2022)
- Major General Waidi Shaibu (21 January 2022 – 21 April 2023)
- Major General Abdulsalam Abubakar (21 April 2023 – 16 July 2023)
- Major General Peter Malla (16 July 2023 – 2 February 2024)
- Brigadier General Abubakar G.L. Haruna (acting; 2 February 2024 – present)

== Headquarters ==
The headquarters of the division is located at Maimalari Barracks in Maiduguri. The barracks serves as one of the major military formations in North-Eastern Nigeria.

== See also ==
- Nigerian Army
- Boko Haram insurgency
- Maiduguri
- Borno State
