= Damboa =

Damboa Marghi City
- City and LGA
- Nickname: Marghi State
- Motto: Center of Agriculture and Commerce
- Interactive map of Damboa
- Location in Nigeria
- Coordinates: 11°09′0″N 12°45′0″E
- Country: Nigeria
- State: Borno State
- Damboa: 1976 Local Government Reform

Government
  - Type: Democracy
  - Chairman: Hon. Ali Mohammed Kauji (APC)

Area
  - Total: 6,219 km^{2} (2,401 sq mi)

Population (2006)
  - Total: 233,500
  - Density: 37.55/km^{2} (97.24/sq mi)
- Time zone: UTC+1 (WAT)
- Postal code: 600101
- Area code: 602
- Website: https://www.dambaoa.gov.ng https://www.damboa.wordpress.com

Damboa is a city and local government area of Borno State, Nigeria. It has an area of 6,219 km² and had a population of 233,200 at the 2006 census.

The postal code of the area is 601. The original settlers of Damboa are the Marghi people, but due to the booming economy of Damboa in the Calabash farming business during this period made many Kanuri people keep travelling to and fro to Damboa in the first place and later end up settling and marrying in Damboa at a later stage. As a result, many of the Damboa people end up becoming half Kanuri and Half Marghi although there are still pure Marghi family as well as pure Kanuri family even as at today. This cultural assimilation brought a little discrepancy among the indigenous of Damboa because some people in Damboa prefers to be identified as Marghi while some other ones preferred to be identified as Kanuris, but the truth is that Damboa composed of Marghi majority and Kanuri minority in the town settle at the Local Government Area.

== Elders of Damboa ==
- ENGR.(Dr) Mohammed Abba Gana
- Comrade Modu Shettima
- Alhaji Abaya Lawan
- Alhaji Bulama Korede
- Karagama M. Kauji
- Malami Wakil Korede
- Late Dr. Lawan Kabu
- Late Alaji Malam Gaji Damboa
- Hon Grema Umar
- Mustapha Zarma Koljiri
- Modu Yerima Gumsuri
- Late Babagana Abbas Dawa
- Habu Hong
- Babagana Musa Kauji
- Alhaji Kaumi Damboa
- Mohammed Salisu
- Ayemu Lawan Gwasha
- Mustapha Tokebe
- Karagama Yaga
- Karagama Azir
- Lawan Makinta
- Alhaji lawan kolo Gumsuri
- Abdullahi Karagama
- Habu Daja Damboa
- Lawan Kolomi (LK)
- Barr. Mohammed Wakil
- Prof. Adamu Garba Alooma
- Adamu Tubo Usman
- Alamin Mohammed Gumsuri
- Alhaji Darman Korede
- Alhaji Bukar Petrol
- Malam Mustapha Gaji

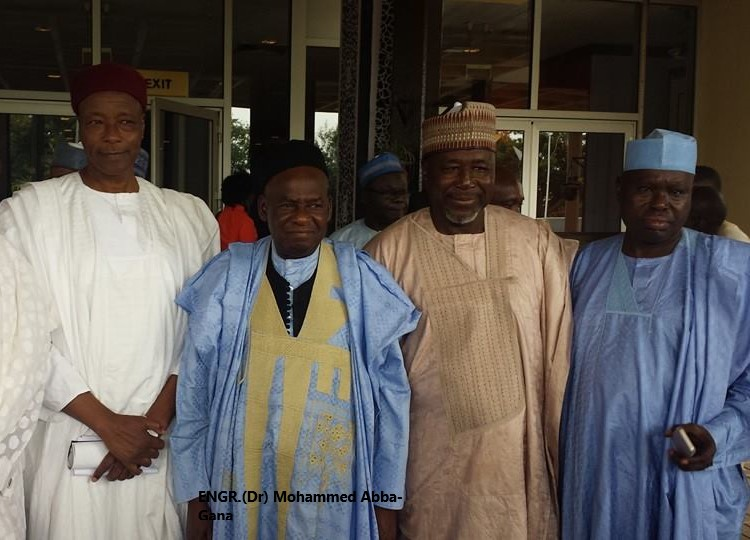
Famous Elders of Damboa

It was one of the sixteen LGAs that constituted the Borno Emirate before establishing Damboa Emirate Council, a traditional state located in Borno State, Nigeria.

== Notable births and residents ==
Notable births and current and former residents of Damboa include:

- Mohammed Abba Gana, Former FCT Minister, Commissioner Northern Eastern State

== Education ==
Federal University of Agricultural Technology Damboa (Proposed)

== Health ==
A 1989 study showed a high rate of guinea worm infection among two groups of families in Mafi and Kawaram, Damboa LGA.

1. General Hospital Damboa

== Climate ==
Damboa experiences a hot and cool season with average highs in April and lows in July and September, and a colder month in January.

Temperatures are high throughout the year, ranging from 27 °C (80 °F) to 41 °C (105 °F), while annual rainfall averages between 500 millimetres (20 in) and 700 millimetres (28 in).

== Attacks ==
A 2012 article in Vanguard News noted the death of Alhaji Lawan Kabu, former Chairman Damboa Local Government Area. It suggested that some of the perpetrators of violence in Borno State were using Boko Haram as an excuse for political violence.

A 28 May 2014 report in the Premium Times quoted "a spokesperson of the local vigilante" as saying:

“Places like Talasla, Ajigin, Mangozam, Abima, Abulam, Keloruwa; all within Damboa Local Government Area have now been taken over by the Boko Haram gunmen”.

A 25 June 2014 report of an attack on a military post at Bulabulin Ngaura was not confirmed by military sources.

On 26 June 2014, Borno State Governor Kashim Shettima had "ordered an investigation into alleged abduction of 60 women by suspected insurgents in Damboa Local Government Area," in the villages of Kummabza, Yaga and Dagu.

On 18 July 2014, Damboa was attacked, with "at least 18 dead ... Eyewitnesses told the BBC that half of Damboa had been burnt down, including the town's main market."

As of 19 October 2014, the town was under Boko Haram control; however, the Arewa Consultative Forum (ACF) had "issued an official statement ... saying that the ceasefire deal announced by government must be followed with the return of all territories captured by the insurgents." On 21 October, 35 insurgents were killed in an attack by 195 Battalion of the 7 Division of the Nigerian Army.
