= Nigerian Defence Academy =

Nigerian military training college

- N.D.A.
- Motto: "Loyalty and valour"
- Type: Military Academy
- Established: 5 February 1964
- Commandant: Major General Oluyemi Olatoye
- Students: ~3,500
- Location: Kaduna, Nigeria
- Campus: Afaka and Ribadu
- Battalions: Burma, Mogadishu, Abyssinia, and Dalet
- Colors: Green and red
- Website: www.nda.edu.ng

The Nigerian Defence Academy (NDA) is a military university based in Kaduna, Nigeria, that trains officer cadets for commissioning into one of the three services of the Nigerian Armed Forces: the Army, the Navy, and the Air Force. The duration of training at the Nigerian Defence Academy is five years (four years academic and one year military).

== History ==
The Nigerian Defence Academy (NDA) was established on 5 February 1964 as a reorganisation of the Royal Military Forces Training College (RMFTC), which had earlier been renamed the Nigerian Military Training College (NMTC) following Nigeria’s independence in 1960.

At its establishment, the Nigerian Defence Academy was modelled after the Indian National Defence Academy in Khadakwasla, Pune, India. The first intake consisted of a small number of cadets, and early training was conducted with assistance from officers of the Indian Army, including its first Commandant, Brigadier M. R. Varma.

During the early years, the academy played a key role in the professionalisation of the Nigerian Armed Forces, particularly during the Nigerian Civil War (1967–1970), when it helped produce officers for rapid military expansion.

By the late 1970s, the Nigerian Defence Academy had transitioned to predominantly Nigerian instructional staff, following an early period in which training was supported by officers of the Indian Army. This shift formed part of a broader process of indigenisation of military training institutions in Nigeria.

In 1985, the academy began awarding bachelor's degrees to officer cadets in addition to military training, formally integrating academic education with military instruction.

In 2011, the academy admitted its first female cadets into the Regular Combatant Course, marking a major development in its admission policy.

In 2021, the academy was attacked by armed gunmen, resulting in the death of officers and raising concerns about security within military institutions in Nigeria.

== Campus and facilities ==
The Nigerian Defence Academy is located in Afaka, Kaduna State. The academy occupies a large training and academic campus which includes lecture halls, laboratories, cadet hostels, parade grounds, military training fields, a central library and sports facilities.

The academy also maintains facilities for physical combat training, weapons handling and field exercises as part of officer training.

== Organization ==
=== Administration ===
The current Commandant is Major General Oluyemi Olatoye. He took over from Major General Abdul Khalifah Ibrahim in October 2025.

=== Military structure ===
- Headquarters
- Directorate of Military Training
- Directorate of Administration
  - NDA Hospital
  - NDA Provost Command
  - Administration Battalion
  - 92 MIR
  - 37 NDA Demonstration Battalion
  - NDA Band
  - Religious Affairs Department
  - Legal Department
  - Civilian Personnel Unit
  - NDA National Youth Service Corps
- Directorate of ICT
- Directorate of Logistics
- Cadet Brigade
- Directorate of Coordination
- Directorate of Finance

== Academics ==
=== Academic structure ===
The academic branch of the Nigerian Defence Academy is responsible for the academic training of cadets and the administration of civilian academic staff. It also oversees the academy library and the School of Postgraduate Studies. The branch is headed by the Academy Provost, who supervises teaching, research and academic planning within the academy.

In 1985, the academy's academic programme was upgraded to degree-awarding status. This change allowed cadets of the Regular Combatant Course to obtain university degrees while undergoing military training.

The Regular Combatant Course lasts for five years. Cadets spend four years in academic studies and one year in intensive military training before being commissioned into the Nigerian Armed Forces.

The academy offers undergraduate and postgraduate programmes through its faculties, which include the Faculty of Arts and Social Sciences, Faculty of Engineering, Faculty of Science, Faculty of Military Science and Interdisciplinary Studies, and Faculty of Management Sciences.

- School of Postgraduate Studies
- Undergraduate Admission
- Postgraduate Admission
- Faculty of Engineering
- Faculty of Science
- Faculty of Art and Social Science
- Faculty of Military Science
- Faculty of Management Science

==== Postgraduate studies ====
The Nigerian Defence Academy established its School of Postgraduate Studies in 2004, and it was formally opened in 2005. The school offers master's and doctoral programmes in both military and civilian fields, including defence studies, military history, engineering, sciences and management.

=== Academic Library ===
Nigerian Defence Academy Library is the main Library that support both teaching and military training. The library acquired and developed information resources that meet the information needs of cadets, faculty members, officers and civilians staff. The academy library was launched at the end of 1963 to facilitate and enhance effective learning. The Library was finally moved to the permanent site on the 16 of June 2009 for effective teaching and learning to meet the objectives and the current Academy Librarian is Dr. Romoke Opeyemi Quadir.

=== Research Elements ===
- Centre For Critical Thinking, Teaching and Learning
- Centre for Defence Studies And Documentation
- Academic Planning Unit
- Research Methodology Office (RMO)
- Directorate for Collaborations, Affiliations and Linkages

== Admission of women ==
For many years, admission into the Regular Combatant Course of the Nigerian Defence Academy was limited to male cadets. In 2011, the academy admitted its first set of female cadets into the regular combatant programme, marking a major change in its history.

== Student life ==
=== Cadet Brigade ===
The Cadet Brigade (CB) is one of the main organs of the NDA. There are a total of 2,990 Regular Combatant cadets in the Academy and 12 allied cadets from Burkina-Faso, Sierra Leone, Republic of Congo, Cameroon and Liberia. The Brigade is commanded by an Army officer and is designated as the Cadets Brigade Commander (CBC). The CB comprises the following:

- Headquarters
- Mogadishu Battalion
- Dalet Battalion
- Abyssinia Battalion
- Burma Battalion
- Ashanti Battalion
- Colito Battalion
- Counseling Unit
- Preparatory Wing
- Valiant Magazine Office

=== NDA Band ===
The NDA Band is responsible for the provision of military music at regimental occasions such as POP, beating the retreat, dinner nights as well as dance band for social gatherings like wedding ceremonies, mess activities or as the circumstances dictate. The NDA Band headed by an Assistant Director of Music (ADOM).

NDA Anthem
- Lyrics: Major J. E. Evans
- Music: Captain Ime Tom Obong

=== NDA Anthem ===
Lyrics
Academy, my academy, our academy.

Academy mother of African warriors.

Academy of wonders, fascination and adventures.

Academy mother of all Generals, Admirals and Air Marshals.

You indeed are the cradle of service with courage conviction and victory.

Academy of indelible memories, dreams and visions.

Academy Academy, in you I realized my potentials and in you I am what I am.

Forever the academy, long live the academy

Forever the Nigerian Defence Academy…

== Commandants ==
The following is a chronological list of Commandants of the Nigerian Defence Academy since its establishment in 1964.

Commandants of the Nigerian Defence Academy
| No. | Name | Rank | Tenure | Notes |
|---|---|---|---|---|
| 1 | Brigadier M. R. Varma | Brigadier | 1964–1969 | First Commandant (Indian national) |
| 2 | Major General David Ejoor | Major General | 1969–1971 | First Nigerian Commandant |
| 3 | Major General Robert Adeyinka Adebayo | Major General | 1971 | — |
| 4 | Major General Eyo Okon Ekpo | Major General | March 1971 – February 1975 | — |
| 5 | Brigadier Illiya Bisalla | Brigadier | February 1975 – August 1975 | — |
| 6 | Brigadier Gibson Jalo | Brigadier | August 1975 – January 1978 | — |
| 7 | Brigadier E. S. Armah | Brigadier | January 1978 – July 1978 | — |
| 8 | Brigadier Joseph Garba | Brigadier | July 1978 – July 1979 | — |
| 9 | Brigadier Zamani Lekwot | Brigadier | July 1979 – 1982 | — |
| 10 | Brigadier Abdullahi Shelleng | Brigadier | 1982 – January 1984 | — |
| 11 | Major General Paul Tarfa | Major General | January 1984 – 1985 | — |
| 12 | Major General Peter Adomokai | Major General | 1986 – 1988 | — |
| 13 | Lieutenant General Salihu Ibrahim | Lieutenant General | 1988 – 1990 | — |
| 14 | Lieutenant General Garba Duba | Lieutenant General | 1990 – February 1992 | — |
| 15 | Lieutenant General Aliyu Mohammed Gusau | Lieutenant General | February 1992 – January 1993 | — |
| 16 | Lieutenant General Mohammed Balarabe Haladu | Lieutenant General | January 1993 – 1994 | — |
| 17 | Air Marshal Al-Amin Daggash | Air Marshal | 1994 – June 1998 | Later Chief of Defence Staff |
| 18 | Major General Bashir Salihi Magashi | Major General | June 1998 – 1999 | — |
| 19 | Major General Thaddeus Ashei | Major General | 2000 – 2002 | — |
| 20 | Major General Okon Edet Okon | Major General | 2002 – 2003 | — |
| 21 | Major General Patrick Ademu Akpa | Major General | 2003 – 2004 | — |
| 22 | Lieutenant General Abel Akale | Lieutenant General | 2004 – 2006 | — |
| 23 | Major General Harris Dzarma | Major General | 2006 – August 2008 | — |
| 24 | Major General Mamuda Yerima | Major General | August 2008 – August 2010 | — |
| 25 | Major General Emeka Onwuamaegbu | Major General | August 2010 – December 2013 | — |
| 26 | Major General Muhammad Inuwa Idris | Major General | December 2013 – August 2015 | — |
| 27 | Major General Mohammed Tasiu Ibrahim | Major General | August 2015 – October 2017 | — |
| 28 | Major General Adeniyi Oyebade | Major General | October 2017 – November 2019 | — |
| 29 | Major General Jamil Sarham | Major General | November 2019 – March 2021 | — |
| 30 | Major General Sagir Yaro | Major General | March 2021 – April 2021 | Interim |
| 31 | Major General Ibrahim Manu Yusuf | Major General | April 2021 – June 2023 | — |
| 32 | Major General John Ochai | Major General | June 2023 – April 2025 | — |
| 33 | Major General Abdul Khalifah Ibrahim | Major General | April 2025 – November 2025 | — |
| 34 | Major General Oluyemi Olatoye | Major General | November 2025 – Present | Current Commandant |

== Alumni ==
- Abdulrahman Bello Dambazau, former Chief of Army Staff
- Alexander Ogomudia, former Chief of Defence Staff & Chief of Army Staff
- Sani Abacha, former Military ruler of Nigeria
- Muhammadu Buhari, President of Nigeria and former Military Head of State
- Azubuike Ihejirika, former Chief of Army Staff
- Dangiwa Umar, former Governor of Kaduna State
- Gideon Orkar, April 1990 coup leader
- Tukur Yusuf Buratai, former Chief of Army Staff, Nigerian Army
- Ibok-Ete Ekwe Ibas, former Chief of Naval Staff, Nigerian Navy
- Kayode Are, former National Security Adviser and Director General State Security Service
- Maxwell Khobe, former ECOMOG Peacekeeping Force Commander and Chief of Defence Staff, Sierra Leone
- Emeka Onwuamaegbu Former Commandant, NDA
- Muhammad Inuwa Idris, Former Commandant, NDA
- Oladipo Diya, former Chief of Defence Staff
- Owoye Andrew Azazi, former Chief of Defence Staff & Chief of Army Staff
- Sultan Sa'adu Abubakar, Sultan of Sokoto
- Sambo Dasuki, National Security Adviser
- Tunji Olurin, former military governor of Oyo State
- Victor Malu, former Chief of Army Staff
- John Michael Ogidi, former ECOMOG Officer and Commander, Corps of Signals
- Christopher Gwabin Musa, former Chief of the Defence Staff
- Lawal Jafar Isa, former Military Governor of kaduna state
