= Seaward Defence Patrol Boat =

Patrol boat class of the Nigerian Navy

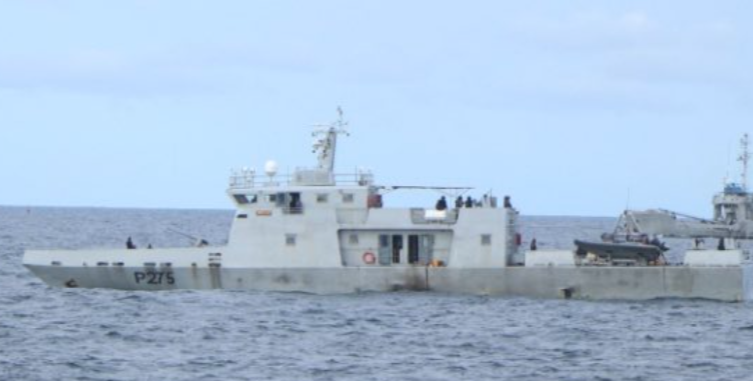
- NNS Oji (P275), one of the Andoni-class patrol boats

Class overview
- Name: Andoni class
- Builders: Naval Dockyard Ltd (NDL)
- Operators: Nigerian Navy
- Planned: 10
- Building: 2
- Completed: 3
- Active: 3

General characteristics
- Type: Patrol boat
- Displacement: 180–200 tons (full load)
- Length: 43 meters
- Beam: 7.5 meters
- Draught: 2.2 meters
- Propulsion: 2 x diesel engines, twin propellers, optimized for endurance and deep-sea operations
- Speed: 30–35 knots
- Range: 2,500 nautical miles at 15 knots
- Capacity: 30–35 personnel (includes boarding team for RHIB operations)
- Armament: 1 x 30mm manned naval gun.; 3 x 12.7mm machine guns.; 1 x 40mm grenade launcher (optional).; 1 x RHIB with enhanced boarding capabilities.

The Seaward Defence Boat is a fast class of patrol boat developed by the Naval Dockyard Limited for the Nigerian Navy and launched in 2012, it has since seen service with navy. The modern SDB program began in the 2000s as part of Nigeria's push for local content development and maritime security in the Gulf of Guinea, a region plagued by piracy and illegal activities.

== Development ==
The Seaward Defence Boat (SDB) program is a Nigerian Navy initiative to design and build indigenous patrol vessels to enhance maritime security in the Gulf of Guinea, combat piracy, and promote local shipbuilding. Launched in the 2000s, the program aligns with Nigeria's Local Content Development Act (2010) and the Nigerian Navy Transformation Plan (2011–2020), emphasizing self-reliance and regional security cooperation

- Development Milestones

NNS Andoni (SDB 1): Commissioned: June 7, 2012. Details: A 31-meter, ~100-ton vessel built at Naval Dockyard Limited (NDL), Lagos. Designed by Vice Admiral GTA Adekeye and Rear Admiral GJ Jonah, it featured a 30mm gun, 12.7mm machine guns, and a Rigid-Hull Inflatable Boat (RHIB). Construction faced delays due to limited technology and skills but marked Nigeria's first indigenously built warship.

NNS Karaduwa (SDB 2): Commissioned: December 15, 2016. Details: A 40-meter, ~150-ton vessel with a top speed of 39 knots, built at NDL with hull fabrication by Dorman Long Engineering. It included a remotely operated 30mm gun and advanced sensors. The hull was turned upright in 2013, a historic milestone for Nigerian shipbuilding.

NNS Oji (SDB 3): Commissioned: December 8, 2021. Details: A 43-meter, ~180–200-ton steel vessel, the largest SDB, with advanced Simrad radar and a 30mm naval gun. Its hull and superstructure were welded together in 2020, showcasing improved local expertise. Cameroon expressed interest in purchasing the design.

== Operator ==
- 3 operated by the Nigerian Navy.

== Active ships ==
- NNS Andoni (P100)
- NNS Karaduwa (P102)
- NNS Oji (P275)
- NNS TBD
- NNS TBD
