= ARA Heroína =

At least two ships of the Argentine Navy have been named Heroína, both named for the frigate Heroína of the United Provinces of the Río de la Plata:

- ARA Heroína (P-32), a Tacoma-class frigate launched in 1943 as USS Reading and renamed on transfer in 1947. She was scrapped in 1966.
- ARA Heroína (D-12), an Almirante Brown-class destroyer launched in 1982.
