= Special Boat Squadron =

Special Boat Squadron can refer to:

- Special Boat Service, known as the Special Boat Squadron 1977-1987 (British Royal Navy)
- Special Boat Service (Nigeria), a Nigerian Sri Lankan special forces unit modeled after the SBS
- Special Boat Squadron (Sri Lanka), a Sri Lankan special forces unit modeled after the SBS

== See also ==
- Special Boat Unit
