= MEKO 360 =

Family of German-designed warships

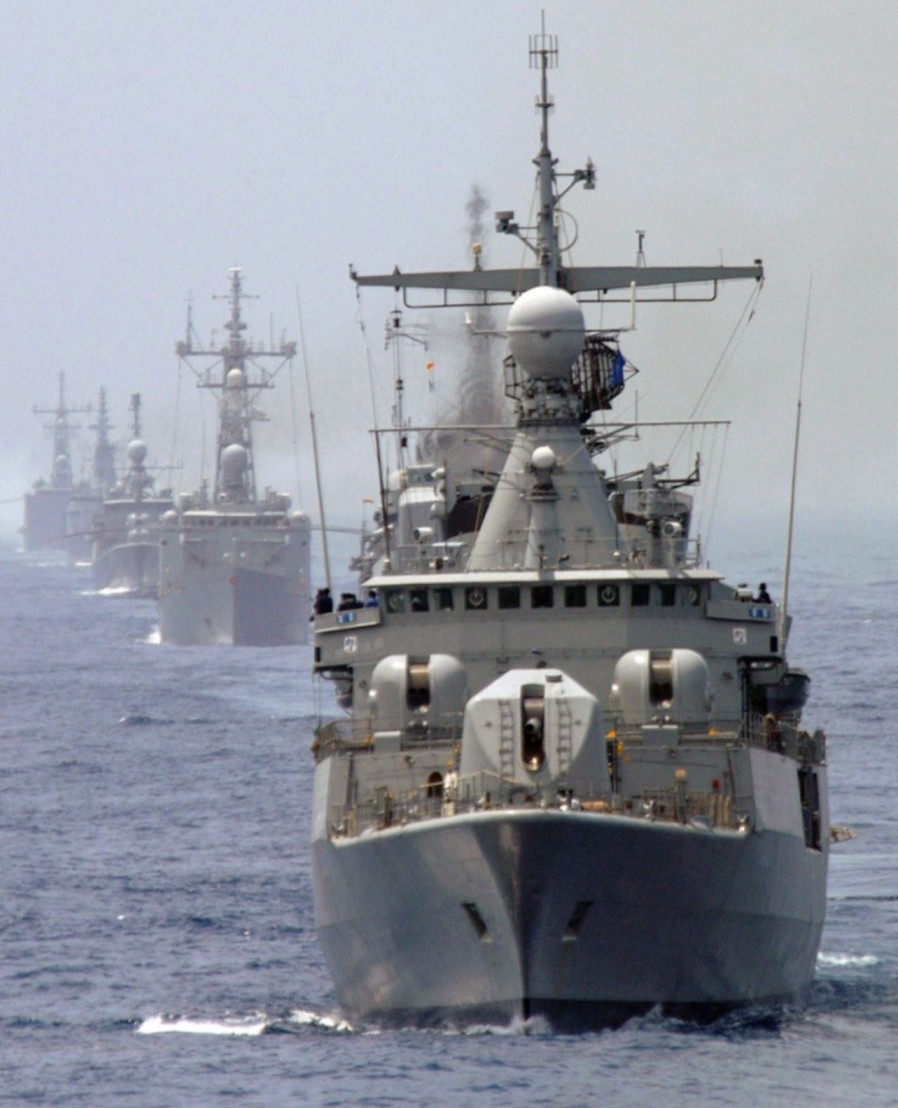
- ARA Almirante Brown

Class overview
- Builders: Blohm + Voss
- Operators: Argentine Navy; Nigerian Navy
- Subclasses: Almirante Brown class
- Built: 1978–1984
- In commission: 1982–present
- Planned: 7
- Completed: 5
- Active: 3
- Laid up: 2

General characteristics
- Type: Frigate
- Displacement: 2,900 long tons (2,900 t) standard; 3,360 long tons (3,410 t) fully loaded
- Length: 125.9 m (413 ft 1 in) oa; 119.0 m (390 ft 5 in) pp
- Beam: 15 m (49 ft 3 in)
- Draught: 5.8 m (19 ft 0 in)
- Propulsion: 2-shaft COGAG; 2 × Olympus TM 3B gas turbines, 51,800 shp (38,600 kW); 2 × Tyne RM-IC gas turbines, 10,200 shp (7,600 kW)
- Speed: 30.5 knots (56.5 km/h; 35.1 mph)
- Range: 4,500 nmi (8,300 km; 5,200 mi) at 18 knots (33 km/h; 21 mph)
- Complement: 200
- Armament: 8 anti-ship missiles; 24 surface-to-air missiles; 1 dual purpose gun; 8 anti-aircraft guns; 6 torpedo tubes; Depth charges
- Aircraft carried: 1 helicopter

The MEKO 360 is a class of five ships built in Germany for the Argentine and Nigerian navies. The MEKO 360 was the first version of the MEKO family of vessels built by Blohm und Voss. The type comes in two variants, the MEKO 360H1, comprising one ship, and the MEKO 360H2, comprising four ships. They are alternatively classed as frigates and destroyers by different sources. The design is based on the modular concept which allows swapping out different armaments to fit mission requirements and allows for easier application of upgrades and refits.

== Variants ==
=== MEKO 360H1 ===
A single vessel of the MEKO 360H1 variant was produced for the Nigerian Navy. Called NNS Aradu, it is one of the largest vessels of that navy.

=== MEKO 360H2 ===
Six vessels were ordered and four vessels of a second variant, MEKO 360H2, were constructed for Argentina. They were locally named the Almirante Brown class. They are considered frigates and destroyers by different publications. The design is based on the concept of modular systems and is capable of changing the armament of the ship swiftly and can be modernized/refitted with more ease.

The ships have a standard displacement of 2,900 long tons (2,900 t) and 3,360 long tons (3,410 t) at full load. The vessels are 125.9 metres (413 ft 1 in) long overall and 119.0 metres (390 ft 5 in) between perpendiculars with a beam of 15 metres (49 ft 3 in) and a draught of 5.8 metres (19 ft 0 in). The vessels are powered by a COGOG system driving two shafts composed of two Olympus TM 3B gas turbines rated at 51,800 shaft horsepower (38,600 kW) and two Tyne RM-IC gas turbines rated at 10,200 shaft horsepower (7,600 kW). The ships have a maximum speed of 30.5 knots (56.5 km/h; 35.1 mph) while using their Olympus gas turbines at 18 knots (33 km/h; 21 mph) using their Tyne turbines. The MEKOs have a maximum range of 4,500 nautical miles (8,300 km; 5,200 mi) at 18 knots.

The Argentinian vessels are armed with eight Exocet surface-to-surface missiles in two quad launchers mounted centrally and one octuple launcher for Aspide surface-to-air missiles mounted aft of the superstructure. The MEKO 360H2 are also equipped with one OTO Melara 5-inch (130 mm)/54 calibre naval gun forward of the superstructure, eight Bofors 40 mm/70 calibre guns, and two triple-mounted 324-millimetre (12.8 in) ILAS torpedo tubes.

== Ships ==
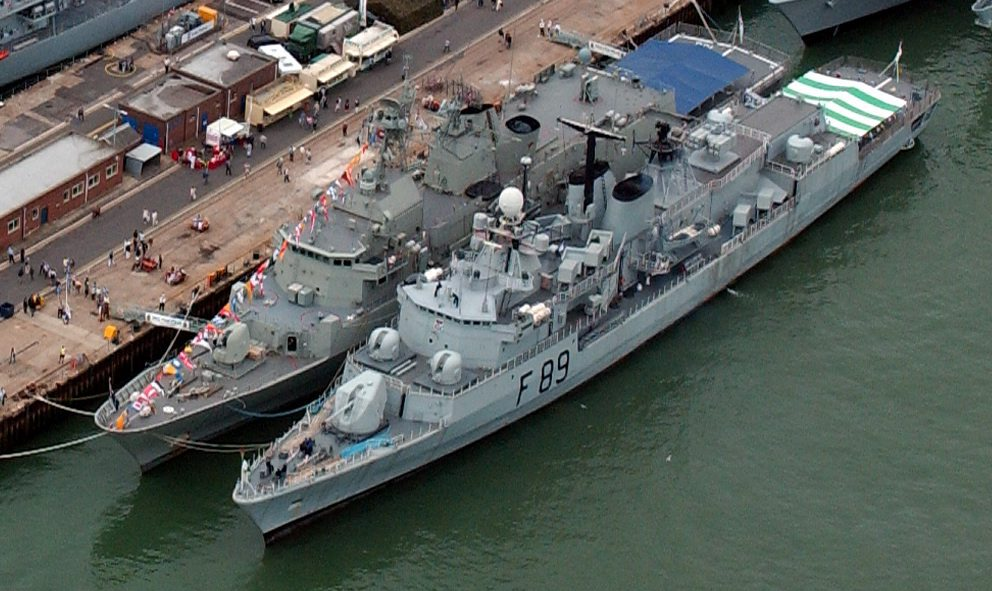
NNS Aradu (F 89), along with smaller MEKO 200 frigate HMAS Anzac

Name	Number	Laid down	Launched	Commissioned	Status
MEKO 360H1
NNS Aradu	F89	1 December 1978	25 January 1980	20 February 1982	Laid up since at least 2017
MEKO 360H2
ARA Almirante Brown	D-10	8 September 1980	28 March 1981	26 January 1983	In service
ARA La Argentina	D-11	30 March 1981	25 September 1981	4 May 1983	In service
ARA Heroína	D-12	24 August 1981	17 February 1982	31 October 1983	Laid up
ARA Sarandí	D-13	9 March 1982	31 August 1982	16 April 1984	In service
ARA Rivadavia	D-14	Cancelled			
ARA Moreno	D-15	Cancelled			

== See also ==
- F125-class frigate
- Sachsen-class frigate
- Hamburg-class destroyer
- MEKO 140
- MEKO 200
- Halifax-class frigate
- Anzac-class frigate
- Formidable-class frigate
- La Fayette-class frigate
- Second Generation Patrol Vessel

== Bibliography ==
- Gardiner, Robert; Chumbley, Stephen & Budzbon, Przemysław, eds. (1995). Conway's All the World's Fighting Ships 1947–1995. Annapolis, Maryland: Naval Institute Press. ISBN 1-55750-132-7.
- Saunders, Stephen, ed. (2009). Jane's Fighting Ships 2009–2010 (112 ed.). Alexandria, Virginia: Jane's Information Group Inc. ISBN 978-0-7106-2888-6.
