= IHSA =

IHSA may stand for:

- Illinois High School Association
- Intercollegiate Horse Shows Association
