= Nigerian Navy Marines =

- Active: 2026 – present
- Country: Nigeria
- Branch: Nigerian Navy
- Type: Marines (Special Operations Tier 2 Force)
- Role: Amphibious warfare Special operations
- Size: Regiment
- Part of: NN Special Operations Command
- Nickname: "Bushman"
- Mottos: Courage and Resilience

Commanders
- Commander-in-Chief: President Bola Ahmed Tinubu
- Chief of the Naval Staff: Vice Admiral Idi Abbas

Insignia
- Identification symbol

The Nigerian Navy Marines is a component of the Nigerian Navy that serves as a special operations-capable naval infantry force.

== History ==
=== Origins ===
The 3 Marine Commando Division of the Nigerian Army under Colonel Benjamin Adekunle dates to the Nigerian Civil War, the first Nigerian troops to be known as "Marines". This formation, consisting of elements of the Lagos garrison along the eastern seaboard, was originally designated the 3 Infantry Division. However, Colonel Adekunle did not think the name "3 Infantry Division" did it project the nature of the unique terrain in which his troops had to fight. Therefore, without formal approval from Army HQ, he renamed it the 3 Marine Commando (3MCDO). Adekunle's 3MCDO participated in the Bonny Landing, the first amphibious operation by a modern Black African armed force in history.

=== Attempts to create marines ===
In November 2024, the "Nigerian Marine Corps Bill (HB 225)" was introduced in the 9th Nigeria National Assembly by the Chairman of the House of Representatives Committee on Navy and the Representative for Kanke/Pankshin/Kanam in Plateau State, Yusuf Adamu Gagdi. The bill sought to establish a specialized maritime enforcement agency—modeled after the United States Marine Corps and the Republic of Korea Marine Corps. During a legislative public hearing however, the bill faced widespread rejection from lawmakers, the Nigerian Navy, and maritime stakeholders, with 67 lawmakers preventing the bill from moving forward.

=== Modern Marines ===
For many years, the Special Boat Service was solely responsible for special operations and marine warfare. The escalating Oil theft in Nigeria overstretched the SBS, forcing a solution to fill the present operational vacuum. As a result, the Chief of the Naval Staff Vice Admiral Emmanuel Ogalla authorized the creation of a permanent marine unit on June 1, 2025, under the control of Nigerian Navy Special Operations Command. On August 14, 2025, the inaugural batch of marine began a their training program, with 326 of the graduating in February 2026, earning the title of "Bushmen".

== Structure ==
Training is done at the Nigerian Navy Marines Training Centre, currently under the leadership of Centre Commandant, Commodore Olayinka Ayodele Aliu. It is host to the Basic Marines Qualifying Course, divided into three distinct phases:

- Selective Qualifying Training, culminating in Camp Ibere (“Start” in Yoruba)
- Land and Jungle Warfare, culminating in Camp Yaki (“Battle” in Hausa)
- Amphibious Warfare and Maritime Interdiction, concluding with Camp Anyiemechaala (“Mission Accomplished” in Igbo)

== Operation ==
OPERATIONS AND DEPLOYMENT

The Nigerian Navy Marines participate in counter-insurgency, counter-terrorism and maritime security operations in Nigeria, particularly in the North-East region. Their operational roles include amphibious operations, reconnaissance, surveillance, maritime interdiction and support for joint military operations against insurgent groups.

Operation HADIN KAI

The Nigerian Navy Marines are deployed in support of Operation HADIN KAI (OPHK), the Nigerian military's counter-insurgency operation in the North-East. Their activities include joint offensive operations against Boko Haram and Islamic State West Africa Province (ISWAP), targeting insurgent positions and supporting efforts to disrupt terrorist activities in the Lake Chad region.

In October 2026, Nigerian Navy Marines, operating alongside the Nigerian Army's 403 Amphibious Brigade, conducted offensive operations in the Lake Chad area of Borno State. The Nigerian Navy reported that the operations resulted in the neutralisation of 34 suspected Boko Haram fighters in two separate engagements on 28 and 30 October 2026. The operations also targeted an identified insurgent enclave at Dumba. The casualty figures were subject to further verification at the time of the Navy's announcement.

Operations in the Lake Chad Region

The Nigerian Navy Marines also undertake operations in the Lake Chad region, contributing to efforts to secure the waterways, disrupt insurgent activities and improve freedom of navigation. These activities support the protection of civilian economic activities, including fishing and other water-based transportation, as well as the security interests of countries bordering Lake Chad.

Their operations form part of broader regional efforts involving Nigerian military formations and the Multinational Joint Task Force (MNJTF) to counter insurgency and improve security across the Lake Chad Basin.

== Equipment ==
- AK-47
- AK-56
- TAR-21
- OZG 762
- AR 15
- CZ Bren2
- 3 AgustaWestland AW109s

== See also ==
- Nigerian Air Force Regiment
- South African Marine Corps
- Namibian Marine Corps
- Brazilian Marine Corps
- Kenya Marine Commando Unit

== Sources ==
- Makinde, Adeyinka (2 July 2024). "The Bonny Landing: The anatomy of Black Africa's first amphibious operation, July to September 1967". The Mariner's Mirror. 110 (3): 335–349. doi:10.1080/00253359.2024.2371202. SSRN 4531431.
