= NNS Ose =

History

Nigeria
- Name: NNS Ose (P186)
- Operator: Nigerian Navy
- Builder: OCEA, Les Sables-d'Olonne
- Commissioned: 2017

Nigeria
- Name: NNS Ose
- Operator: Nigerian Navy

General characteristics
- Class & type: Ocea FPB 72
- Length: 24 metres (79 ft)
- Beam: 5.8 metres (19 ft)
- Draught: 1.5 metres (4.9 ft)
- Speed: 35 knots (40 mph; 65 km/h)
- Range: 600 nautical miles (690 mi; 1,100 km)
- Complement: 12

NNS Ose (P186) is a small patrol boat operated by the Nigerian Navy. She was commissioned in 2017, along with half a dozen sister ships.

== Design ==
Ose and her sister ships are Ocea FPB 72 vessels, just 24 metres (79 ft) long, with a range of 600 nautical miles (690 mi; 1,100 km), sufficient for short missions, within Nigeria's Exclusive Economic Zone. She carries a crew of twelve, and can proceed at up to 35 knots (40 mph; 65 km/h).

== Operational career ==
On April 20, 2020, the Ose was sent to help rescue mariners aboard the container ship Tommi Ritscher, after it was boarded by pirates. The liquid natural gas carrier was captured when moored off the coast of Benin. The Tommi Ritscher had a crew of nineteen, eleven of whom were able to make it to a safe room. Her Bulgarian Captain, three Russians, and a Ukrainian and three other crewmembers were taken hostage.

TASS reports that Benin patrol boats were able to drive off the hijacker's support boats. They reported that Benin negotiators allowed the hijackers to leave the ship, taking their eight hostages with them. They reported that three of the hostages were Russian citizens.

The Ose was dispatched after Benin called upon a memorandum of understanding between the two nations, and requested Nigerian assistance. The Ose carried ten Nigerian Navy commandos to effect the boarding.
