= NNS Oji =

NNS Oji (P-275) is the third and latest iteration of the Seaward Defence Boat class of vessels built for the Nigerian Navy by its engineers at the Naval Dockyard, Victoria Island, Lagos.

The vessel was commissioned by the Nigerian president Muhammadu Buhari who said that "our country is faced with a serious decline in our revenue and the security challenges we are facing" and that the personnel should make good use of the platforms as well as maintain professionalism.

NNS Oji is one of a line of indigenous littoral vessels with the first of the SDB class, NNS Andoni (P-100), delivered on 7 June 2012, and 40-metre (130 ft) SDB 2 NNS Karaduwa (P-102) delivered on 15 December 2016.

For patrol duties it is armed with a 30 mm remotely operated naval gun, three 12.7 mm machine guns, and an optional 40 mm grenade launcher.

It is fitted with a Simrad radar control station, and an RHIB to launch naval boarding parties is carried at the rear of the vessel.
