= Kenya Marine Commando Unit =

- Active: 5 May 2023 – present
- Country: Kenya
- Branch: Kenya Navy
- Type: Marines
- Role: Amphibious warfare Special operations
- Size: Regiment
- Garrison/HQ: Mombasa
- Motto: "Quell the Storm"
- Abbreviation: KMCU

Insignia
- Identification symbol

The Kenya Marine Commando Unit (KMCU) is a special operations-capable naval infantry force within the Kenya Navy.

== History ==
The inaugural Kenya Navy Marine Commandos Basic Training Course was launched on 28 February 2023. The unit was officially formed on May 5, 2023 at the Mtongwe Naval Base in Mombasa. The creation of the KMCU was part of a five-year defense agreement between the Kenya Defence Forces and the British Armed Forces. The initial training was led by 40 Commando of the Royal Marines and the United Kingdom Commando Force. A specialized 500-meter military assault course for this purpose was built at Mtongwe, which was an exact replica of the Commando Training Centre Royal Marines in Lympstone, a village in the English county of Devon. In November 2023, British King Charles III and President William Ruto visited Mtongwe Naval Base to witness the KMCU perform a simulation exercise. Members of the United States Marine Forces Special Operations Command's Marine Special Operations Team conducted a Joint Combined Exchange Training with the KMCU in Isiolo in central Kenya, in February 2026.

== See also ==
- Nigerian Navy Marines
- South African Marine Corps
- Namibian Marine Corps
- Brazilian Marine Corps
