= FPB 72-class patrol boat =

Fast patrol boat designed by Ocea

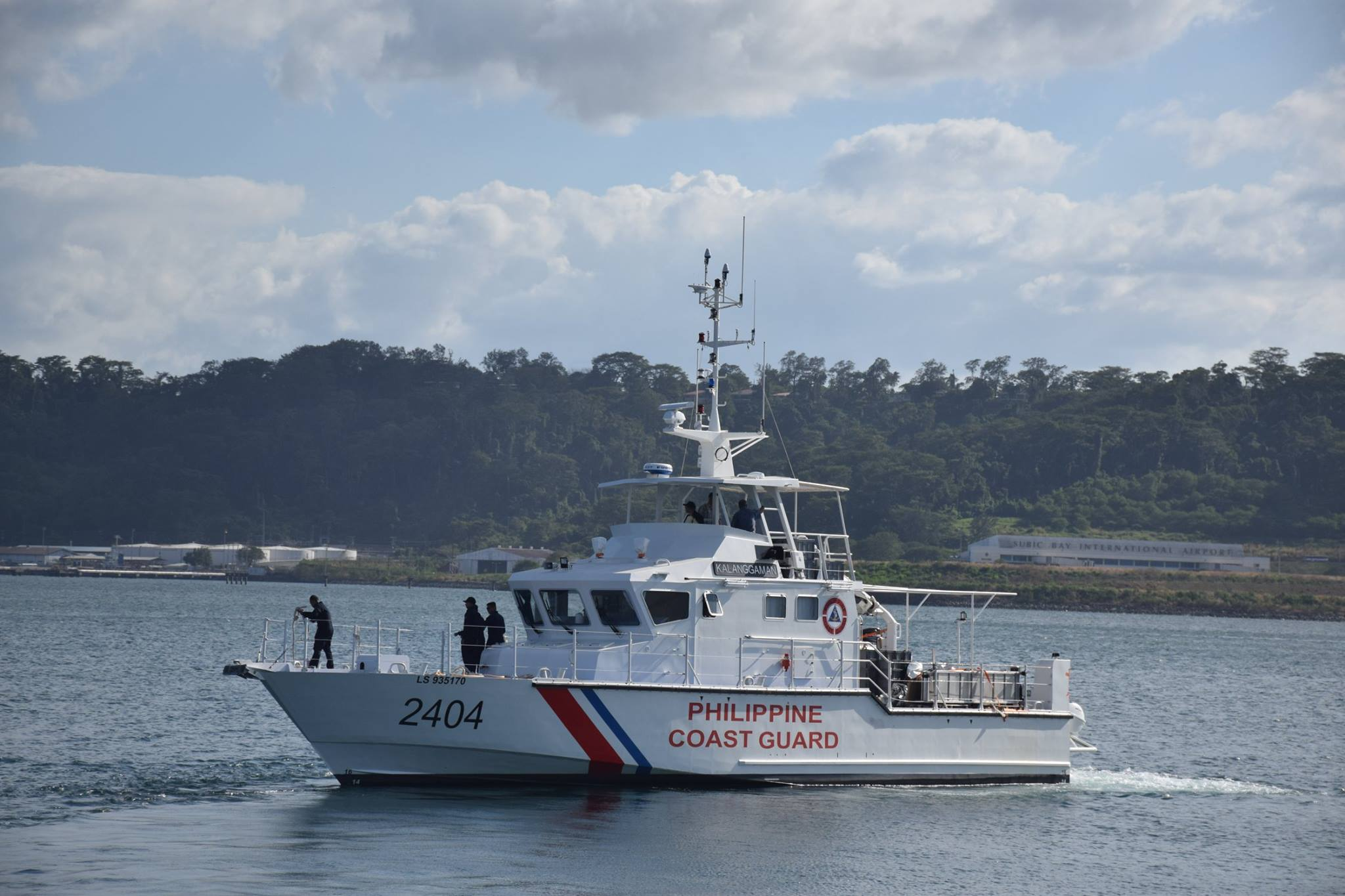
- Philippine Coast Guard patrol boat, BRP Kalanggaman (FPB-2404)

Class overview
- Builders: OCEA Shipbuilding, France
- Operators: Nigerian Navy Philippines Coast Guard Suriname Coast Guard

General characteristics
- Type: Patrol boat
- Displacement: 120 tons
- Length: 24 m (78 ft 9 in)
- Beam: 5.8 m (19 ft 0 in)
- Draught: 1.7 m (5 ft 7 in)
- Propulsion: 2 x 10V 2000 M72 MTU engines
- Speed: 28 knots (52 km/h; 32 mph)
- Range: 800 nmi (1,500 km; 920 mi) at 21 knots (39 km/h; 24 mph); 2,000 nmi (3,700 km; 2,300 mi) at 12 knots (22 km/h; 14 mph)
- Complement: 12

French shipbuilding firm Ocea has designed and sold a fast patrol boat it calls the Ocea FPB 72. As of June 2018 it has delivered FPB 72 vessels to Suriname, Nigeria and the Philippines.

== Design ==
The vessels are 24 metres (78 ft 9 in) long, have a top speed of 30 knots (56 km/h; 35 mph). They can be armed with machine guns, or an autocannon.

== Nigerian Navy ==
Seven Ocea FPB 72 vessels were delivered to the Nigerian Navy. NNS Okpoku, NNS Bomadi, and NNS Badagry were delivered in 2013. NNS Shiroro and NNS Ose were delivered in 2017. NNS Gongola and NNS Calabar were delivered in 2018.

== Suriname Coast Guard ==
In November 2012 the defence and internal affairs Ministry of Suriname bought three patrol vessels from the French company Ocea for the Coast Guard. This order was worth 16 million euros. These patrol vessels will be used for fishery protection and to counterattack piracy in Surinamese waters. The first Fast Patrol Boat (P201), a Ocea FPB 98 type, was delivered in June 2013. The first boat arrived in Paramaribo with a container vessel from the port of Saint-Nazaire, France. Delivery of the remaining two vessels (P101 & P102), FPB 72 types, occurred by the end of July, 2013.

== Philippine Coast Guard ==
On September 9, 2014, the Philippine Coast Guard (PCG) through the Department of Transportation (DOTr) and the French Shipbuilder OCEA entered an agreement to supply the latter with four 24 m FPB-72 Patrol Boats and one 82 m (269 ft 0 in) OPV-270 Offshore Patrol Vessel provided by a loan granted by the French Government.

The FPB-72 Patrol Boats is designated as Boracay-class patrol vessel in the Philippine Coast Guard Service.

The first of the four FPB-72, BRP Boracay arrived at the Alava Pier in Subic, Philippines on August 8, 2018 while the second boat, BRP Panglao arrived on September 3. Both Boracay and Panglao were commissioned together during the PCG anniversary celebration on October 17, 2018.

BRP Malamawi, the third boat out of four, was launched in July 2018 and is expected to be delivered by November 2018. The fourth and last FPB-72 Patrol Boat for the Philippine Coast Guard, BRP Kalanggaman was launched August 13, 2018 and is expected to be delivered by January 2019.
