= NNS Badagry =

Nigerian patrol boat

NNS Badagry is an Ocea FPB 72 patrol boat operated by the Nigerian Navy.

== Design ==
Badagry is 24 metres (79 ft) long, and is capable of travelling at 30 knots (56 km/h; 35 mph).

== Operational history ==
On August 13, 2013, Badagry engaged in a gun battle with pirates who had captured MT Norte, an oil tanker. The pirates tried to flee, and twelve of the sixteen pirates were killed before the survivors surrendered.
