= NNS Bomadi =

NNS Bomadi (P176) is an Ocea FPB 72 patrol boat operated by the Nigerian Navy.

== Design ==
Bomadi is 24 metres (78 ft 9 in) long, and is capable of traveling at 30 knots (56 km/h; 35 mph).

== Operational history ==
On August 13, 2014, Bomadi captured MV Elmina, with a load of stolen crude oil. Her crew of 20 were taken into custody. On August 19, Bomadi impounded a grounded barge, MV Lila, loaded with contraband oil.
