= NNS Aradu =

Nigerian frigate

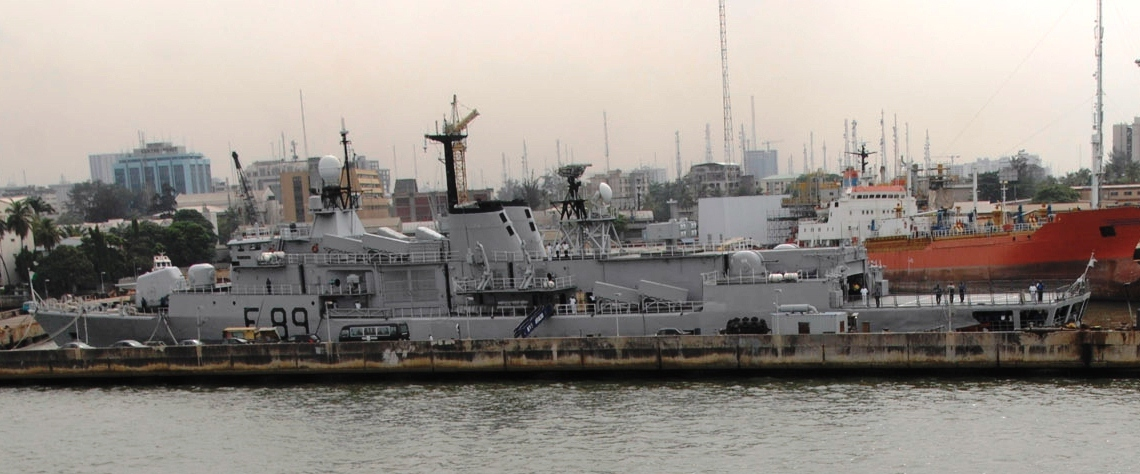
- NNS Aradu in Lagos (2011)

History

Nigeria
- Name: Aradu
- Builder: Blohm & Voss, Hamburg, West Germany
- Laid down: 1 December 1978
- Launched: 25 January 1980
- Commissioned: 20 February 1982
- Identification: Pennant number: F89
- Status: Out of service

General characteristics
- Class & type: MEKO 360H1 frigate
- Displacement: 3,360 long tons (3,414 t) full load
- Length: 125.6 m (412 ft 1 in) oa
- Beam: 15 m (49 ft 3 in)
- Draught: 5.8 m (19 ft 0 in)
- Propulsion: 2 × Rolls-Royce Olympus TM3B gas turbines; 50,880 shp (37,940 kW); 2 × MTU 20V 956 TM92 diesel engines; 10,420 bhp (7,770 kW), 2 shafts; 2 × Kamewa controllable pitch propellers
- Speed: 30.5 knots (56.5 km/h)
- Range: 6,500 nmi (12,000 km) at 15 knots (28 km/h)
- Complement: 195 (26 officers)
- Sensors & processing systems: Plessey AWS 5 air/surface search radar; Racal Decca 1226 navigation radar; Signaal STIR fire control radar; Atlas Elektronik sonar
- Electronic warfare & decoys: Two chaff dispensers; Decca RDL-2 ESM
- Armament: 8 × Otomat Mk 1 ship-to-ship missiles; 24 × Aspide surface-to-air missiles in octuple launcher; 1 × 5 in (127 mm) OTO Melara Otobreda 127/54 Compact gun; 8 × Bofors 40 mm gun; 6 × 324 mm (13 in) torpedo tubes; 1 depth charge rack
- Aircraft carried: 1 × Lynx Mk.89

NNS Aradu (F89) (meaning "thunder" in Hausa) is a Nigerian Navy frigate. She is the first of the MEKO 360 general purpose frigates built by the German company, Blohm + Voss. The 125.6-metre (412 ft 1 in) ship is the largest in the Nigerian Navy. As a general purpose frigate, Aradu has capabilities for anti-air, anti-surface, and anti-submarine warfare. Additionally, she carries a ship-borne helicopter for anti-submarine warfare, search and rescue, and enhanced surveillance/detection.

Commissioned in 1982, Aradu has been mostly out of service since the early 2010s.

== Design and description ==
The first of the MEKO 360 type frigates, Aradu was constructed using modular prefabrication and containerised weapons and sensors. The first frigate to be built in this manner, this allowed for speedier construction time. The ship measures 119.0 metres (390 ft 5 in) at the waterline and 125.9 metres (413 ft 1 in) overall with a beam of 15.0 metres (49 ft 3 in) and a draught of 5.8 metres (19 ft 0 in). The frigate's full load displacement is 3,360 long tons (3,414 t). (Note: Gardiner, Chumbley & Budzbon have the standard displacement at 3,600 long tons (3,658 t) and full load displacement at 4,200 long tons (4,267 t), which is an apparent error, being inconsistent with figures given for similar Argentinian MEKO 360 frigates (2900/3360 tons respectively) (p. 11).) The ship is powered by a CODOG system made up of two Rolls-Royce Olympus TM3B gas turbines rated at 50,000 shaft horsepower (37,000 kW) giving the ship a maximum speed of 30.5 knots (56.5 km/h; 35.1 mph) during use and two MTU Type V 956 TH92 diesel engines rated at 10,420 brake horsepower (7,770 kW) with a maximum speed of 18 knots (33 km/h; 21 mph) under use. The engines turn two Kamewa controllable pitch propellers and the vessel carries 440 long tons (447 t) of fuel. This gives the frigate a range of 6,500 nautical miles (12,000 km; 7,500 mi) at 15 knots (28 km/h; 17 mph), with an endurance of 90 days.

The ship is armed with eight Otomat Mk 1 ship-to-ship missiles carried amidships with four situated behind the mast and forward the twin funnels and two each amidships on each side of the ship. The vessel is also armed with twenty-four Aspide surface-to-air missiles in an octuple launcher mounted atop the hangar. Aradu is armed with one 5 in (127 mm) OTO Melara Otobreda 127/54 Compact gun mounted forward and four twin-mounted Bofors 40 mm guns situated forward behind the 5-inch gun and to either side of the hangar. Aradu also has six STWS-13 324 mm (13 in) torpedo tubes in two triple mounts located amidships on either side of the ship and one depth charge rack.

Aradu is equipped with Plessey AWS 5 air/surface search radar, Racal Decca 1226 navigation radar, Signaal STIR and WM 25 fire control radar and Atlas Elektronik hull-mounted sonar. The ship originally mounted PHS 32 sonar, but this was later replaced. The frigate mounts two chaff dispensers and Decca RDL-2 electronic support measures. The ship has a hangar and flight deck capable of operation two helicopters of the Westland Lynx Mk.89 type, but usually only carries one. The vessel has a complement of 195, including 26 officers. (Note: In 2005 it was reported that the ship had a crew of about 250 and required 500,000 litres (110,000 imp gal; 130,000 US gal) of petrol per voyage.)

== Construction and history ==
The need to have a modern sophisticated frigate to complement and eventually replace the Nigerian Navy's long serving frigate, NNS Obuma became apparent to naval planners in the mid-1970s. NNS Nigeria was fast becoming irrelevant in the fast changing world of naval technology. The Nigerian Navy needed to reach blue waters with the appropriate ships in terms of firepower, extended operational range and enhanced surveillance capability. The MEKO 360 frigate became the answer to these aspirations. The ship initially named Republic was ordered on 3 November 1977 from Blohm + Voss. Her keel was laid down at Hamburg, West Germany on 1 December 1978 and she was launched on 25 January 1980. (Note: Gardiner, Chumbley & Budzbon have the keel laying date as 2 May 1979.) On 1 November of the same year, following a new policy of the Nigerian Navy, the frigate was renamed Aradu meaning "thunder". The ship was deemed completed on 4 September 1981. Aradu sailed from its shipyard and arrived Lagos on 21 December 1981 and was commissioned on 22 February 1982.

Since she entered naval service, NNS Aradu has taken part in major naval exercises, fleet reviews and diplomatic cruises. She played a prominent part in "Operation Seadog" in 1985 and "Operation Odion" in 1987. In 1987, Aradu ran aground twice and was involved in a major collision. The frigate underwent a significant refit in 1991 at Wilmont Point, Lagos with Blohm + Voss aid, lasting until 1994. The ship has undertaken extensive diplomatic visits to countries like Gabon, Congo, Zaire, Equatorial Guinea and numerous European countries. She has also participated in joint exercises with visiting ships of the German, Indian, French and the Brazilian navies. Aradu ran aground again early in 1994 during post refit trials, and was assessed as beyond economical repair in 1995, but then managed to go to sea again in early 1996, and again in 1997 when she broke down for several months in Monrovia, Liberia. She then steamed back to Lagos on one engine in 1998.

Aradu was refitted, refurbished and equipped after being alongshore for over twelve years. The ship proved it was still seaworthy by taking part in celebrations commemorating the 200th anniversary of the Battle of Trafalgar by sailing to Great Britain in August 2005 to join 100 warships from 36 navies. The frigate also participated in two major exercises in 2005 and 2006, called "Igbochi" and "Idabo".

During the Second Liberian Civil War, Aradu patrolled Liberian waters, showing the flag. In a bid to strengthen Nigeria/Brazil military cooperation, two naval ships, Aradu and Nwamba, departed Nigeria on 3 August 2007 to take part in Brazil BiCentenary Celebrations. The ships arrived in Monrovia, Liberia, on 9 August. They were received by the Chief of Defense Staff of Liberia, Major General Abdurahman of the Nigerian Army. From there, they sailed to Recife before entering Rio de Janeiro for the celebrations.

By 2017, the condition of Aradu was reported as "deplorable" and the Nigerian Navy stated that over 250 million dollars were required to make the ship seaworthy. As the Nigerian Navy did not have the funds to make such an investment, Aradu remains dockside.

In late 2019, photographs of Aradu surfaced online which showed the frigate was undergoing a refit at the Naval Dockyard limited in Victoria Island, Lagos. In the photographs, metal sheets were being welded on the lower part of the ship's hull. Also, according to an article published by Military Africa on 6 February 2020, Aradu was to be made operational before the end of 2020. Furthermore, the report also suggests that Aradu would not be fully refitted for combat operations due to the age and obsolescence of its weapons, fire control and navigational systems, but would undertake a new mission as a combat training ship for Nigeria's new general-purpose frigate valued at $350 million, expected to be delivered in the coming years.

In April 2021, Nigerian Navy announced plan to acquire new frigate to replace Aradu and to serve as the new flagship of the navy. Just over two years later, the navy announced a plan to modernize Aradu at the Dearsan Shipyard in Turkey. In 2025, the Nigerian Director of Navy Affairs speculated that Aradu could be decommissioned due to its high repair cost.
