= MT Norte =

Brazilian oil tanker

History
- Name: Iver Explorer (1991–2005); Norte (2005–2018)
- Ordered: 28 April 1988
- Builder: Uljanik, Pula, Croatia
- Yard number: 391
- Laid down: 25 November 1989
- Launched: 12 May 1990
- Completed: 8 February 1991
- In service: 1991–2018
- Identification: IMO number: 8706090
- Fate: Broken up

General characteristics
- Type: Product tanker
- Tonnage: 22,733 GT; 40,077 DWT
- Length: 176 m (577 ft)
- Beam: 32 m (105 ft)
- Draught: 11.23 m (37 ft)
- Depth: 15.1 m (50 ft)
- Installed power: Burmeister & Wain 5L60MC (7,830 kW)
- Propulsion: Single shaft; fixed-pitch propeller
- Speed: 14.3 knots (26.5 km/h; 16.5 mph)

MT Norte, formerly MT Iver Explorer, was a Brazilian oil tanker.

In August 2013 pirates hijacked Norte, when it was servicing oil fields off the coast of Nigeria.

The pirates held Norte for four days. Nigerian authorities negotiated a peaceful surrender. According to the Sahara Reporters the Nigerians agreed that only one vessel would shadow Norte, and the remaining seven vessels would withdraw. According to the Sahara Reporters the Nigerians were surprised when the pirates tried to escape. NNS Badagry pursued the pirates, and engaged in a thirty minute chase and gun battle. Only four pirates survived, and were taken into custody. Twelve pirates who had been killed went down with their boat, which had been riddled with gunfire. Piracy Report challenged Nigeria's policy of not laying charges against pirates, asserting it increased the risk of piracy.

The ship was broken up in 2018.
