= Nigerian Navy =

Branch of the Nigerian Armed Forces

- Founded: 1 June 1956; (70 years, 5 months)
- Country: Nigeria
- Type: Navy
- Role: Naval warfare
- Part of: Nigerian Armed Forces
- Motto: "Onward Together"
- Fleet: 1 landing ship tank 1 frigate 2 offshore patrol vessels 2 minesweepers 9 fast patrol boats 2 patrol cutters 16 inshore patrol crafts
- Engagements: Nigerian Civil War; First Liberian Civil War; Sierra Leone Civil War; Conflict in the Niger Delta; Boko Haram insurgency Invasion of the Gambia; Insurgency in Southeastern Nigeria
- Website: navy.mil.ng

Commanders
- Commander-in-Chief: President Bola Ahmed Tinubu
- Chief of Defence Staff: General Olufemi Oluyede
- Chief of the Naval Staff: Vice Admiral Idi Abbas

Insignia
- Naval ensign

Aircraft flown
- Attack: Lynx Mk.89
- Reconnaissance: Aerostar
- Trainer: AgustaWestland AW109

The Nigerian Navy (NN) is the naval branch of the Nigerian Armed Forces. According to the 2026 Ranking of the Global Firepower Index, it has a naval fleet size of 153 vessels, making it the largest naval force in Africa. It is considered well-trained and has participated in several peacekeeping missions. The NN is renowned as a stabilizing force in the Gulf of Guinea.

== History ==
The Nigerian Navy owes its origin to the Nigerian Marine. Formed in 1914 after the amalgamation of the then Northern and Southern Nigeria, the Nigerian Marine, as it became known after 1914, was a quasi-military organization. This force expanded to become the Southern Nigerian Marine in 1893. A Northern Nigeria equivalent was formed in 1900. The two Marines were merged in 1914. Responsibilities included administration of the ports and harbours, dredging of channels, buoyage and lighting. It also operated ferry services, touring launches, and other small craft that plied the various creeks and other inland waterways.

The first of these new organizations was the Nigerian Ports Authority, which was charged with the running of ports and ensuring safe navigation. The second organisation was the Inland Waterways Department, which took over the running of ferries and touring launches. The third organisation was the Nigerian Naval Force, made up mostly of reserve Royal Navy officers and ex-Service personnel who had been transferred to the Nigerian Ports Authority from the defunct Nigerian Marine. Its primary responsibility was to train the personnel and set up the appropriate infrastructure necessary for the planned Navy. The first basic training establishment for the future Navy—the HMNS Quorra—was started on 1 November 1957 with 60 junior ratings, who underwent a 6-month basic seamanship course.

In July 1959, the Nigerian Naval Force was transformed into a full-fledged Navy when Queen Elizabeth II granted permission for it to use the title "Royal Nigerian Navy". The name was changed to the "Nigerian Navy" in 1963 after Nigeria became a republic. The constitutional task of the Navy was expanded in 1964 after the repeal of the 1958 Ordinance. The new law, known as the Navy Act of 1964, for the first time tasked the Navy with the "naval defence of Nigeria". Other tasks assigned to the Navy by the 1964 Act were essentially coast guard duties, namely assisting in the enforcement of customs laws, making hydrographic surveys, and training officers and men in naval duties.

These tasks were essentially routine functions of any navy. Consequently, the naval leadership began to mount pressure on the political leadership to re-define the constitutional role of the navy. In 1993, this pressure yielded the desired result and under a new law, Armed Forces Decree 105 (now known as the Armed Forces Act), was incorporated as part of the 1999 Constitution. The Nigerian Navy was given expanded military and constabulary roles, especially in the oil and gas sectors of the Nigerian maritime economy.

== Command structure ==
The NN is currently structured into 11 Branches at the Naval Headquarters, 6 commands and a number of autonomous units. The 6 commands are made up of 3 operational commands – Western Naval Command, Central Naval Command and Eastern Naval Command with headquarters located at Apapa, Yenagoa and Calabar- as well as the Training, Doctrine & Logistics Commands with headquarters at Ebubu rivers state, Bonny camp VI and Oghara respectively. Each of the 6 commands is headed by a Flag Officer of the rank of Rear Admiral. The NN autonomous units include:

- Naval Ordnance Depot (NOD)
- Navy Holdings Limited (NHL) and 9 subsidiary companies.
  - Naval Dockyard Limited (NDL)
  - Naval Shipyard Limited (NSYL)
  - Naval Building & Construction Company Limited (NBCCL)
  - Navy Hotels & Suites Limited (NHSL)
  - Navy Micro Finance Bank Limited (NMFBL),
  - Navy Maritime Services Limited (NMSL)
  - Naval Exchange (NAVEX)
  - Naval Engineering Services Limited (NESL)
  - Navy Clearing and Forwarding Services Limited (NCFSL).
- The autonomous units and support facilities enable the NN to maintain the fleet and personnel for sustained operations. The NN has also, recently, established a Project Implementation, Monitoring and Evaluation Directorate at the NHQ for better management of NN projects.

=== Naval Headquarters ===
The Naval Headquarters is the administrative and policy-making organ of the Nigerian Navy. At its head is the Chief of the Naval Staff, who exercises full command of the Nigerian Navy. The Chief of Naval Staff currently has eleven staff branches including the Office of the Navy Secretary. The branches are: Policy and Plans, Training, Operations, Administration, Naval Engineering, Logistics, CTRANS, Accounts and Budget, CCIT, and Safety and Standards. These branches are headed by Principal Staff Officers of flag rank.

=== Chief of the Naval Staff ===
The Chief of the Naval Staff is the highest ranking military officer of the Nigerian Navy. The position is often occupied by the most senior commissioned officer appointed by the Commander-in-Chief of the Armed Forces of Nigeria.The Chief of the Naval Staff reports to the Chief of Defence Staff, who also reports to the Defence Minister. The Statutory duty of the Officer is to formulate and execute policies towards the highest attainment of National Security and operational competence of the Nigerian Navy. The current Chief of Naval Staff is Vice Admiral Idi Abbas, who was appointed on 30 October 2025, by President Bola Ahmed Tinubu to succeed Vice Admiral Emmanuel Ogalla.

Directly under the Naval Headquarters are three operational commands (Western Naval Command, Eastern Naval Command, and Central Naval Command), one training command, one logistics command, and several autonomous units.

=== Western Naval Command ===
The Western Naval Command Headquarters is located at Apapa in Lagos. It covers the sea and coastal areas from the Nigeria/Benin border at longitude 2° 49' E to longitude 5° E in Delta State, from the Nigerian coastline to the limit of the nation's exclusive economic zone. The command has the following units under its jurisdiction:

- Headquarters, Western Naval Command
- Western Fleet at Apapa.
- NNS Beecroft, an operations base at Apapa.
- Naval Air Base, Ojo, Lagos.
- Nigerian Navy Reference Hospital, Ojo, Lagos.
- Fleet Support Group (West) at Apapa.
- NNS WEY, a maintenance unit at Navy Town, Ojo.
- Forward Operating Bases Igbokoda and Badagary in Ondo and Lagos states, respectively.
- Nigerian Navy Secondary School, Abeokuta.
- Nigerian Navy Secondary School, Ojo.
- Nigerian Navy Secondary School, Ogbomoso.
- Nigerian Navy Secondary School, Imeri, Ondo State.

The Western Naval Command Also maintains presence at Tongegi Island in Ondo State.

The Western Command is headed by a Flag Officer Commanding who is of the rank of Rear Admiral. The previous Flag Officers Commanding are Rear Admiral RO Osondu, Rear Admiral FD Bobai, Rear Admiral SAG Abbah, Rear Admiral OH Ngalabak., Rear Admiral Oladele Bamidele Daji and Rear Admiral Barabutemegha Jason Gbassa. The current Flag officer commanding is Rear Admiral Yakubu Bala Wambai.

=== Eastern Naval Command ===
The Eastern Naval Command is the second operations command of the Nigerian Navy and covers the sea area from longitude 6° 30'E in Delta State to the Nigeria/Cameroon border at longitude 8° 30' E, and from the Nigerian coastline to the limit of the nation's exclusive economic zone. The headquarters is at Calabar. The Command has the following units under its jurisdiction:

- NNS Victory, an operations base at Calabar.
- NNS Pathfinder, an operations base at Port Harcourt.
- NNS Jubilee, an operations base at Ikot Abasi.
- Eastern Fleet at Calabar.
- Naval Air Station, Calabar (to be constructed)
- Forward Operating Bases Bonny and Ibaka in Rivers and Akwa Ibom States respectively.
- Naval Outpost at Ikuru in Rivers State.
- Fleet Support Group (East) at Calabar.
- Navy Hospitals at Calabar and Port Harcourt.
- Nigerian Navy Secondary Schools at Calabar and Port Harcourt.
- Nigerian Navy Reference Hospital Calabar.

=== Central Naval Command ===
The Central Naval Command is the third operations command of the Nigerian Navy. The headquarters is in Yenagoa in Bayelsa State. Its area of responsibility stretches from the Benin River entrance (longitude 5° 00'E) to the Santa Barbara River entrance (longitude 6° 30'E), encompassing the coastal states of Bayelsa, Delta, and Edo, and the landward states, including Kogi.

The command has the following units under its jurisdiction:

- NNS Delta, an operations base in Warri, Delta State
- Naval Air Station, Effurun-Warri, Delta State
- Navy Hospital, Warri, Delta State
- Forward Operating Bases Escravos and Formoso in Delta and Bayelsa states, respectively.
- NNS Lugard, an inland operations base on the River Niger at Lokoja, Kogi State.
- Naval Outposts at Idah and Onitsha in Kogi and Anambra States respectively.
- Nigerian Navy Secondary School Okura-Olafia, Kogi State

=== Naval Training Command ===
The main functions of the Naval Training Command are the coordination and harmonization of training doctrines and standards for all local training in the Nigerian Navy, as evolved by the Naval Headquarters. The Command is headed by the Flag Officer Commanding, who is assisted by nine principal staff officers, namely: the Command Staff Officer, the Command Technical Training Officer, Command Logistic Training Officer, and Command Medical Training Officer. Others are the Command Academic Training Officer, CABO, CAO, CINTO and CPM. The units under the Naval Training Command are:

- Sea Training Unit at Victoria Island, Lagos. It is responsible for Basic Operations Sea Training, Safety Operations Sea Training, and Consolidated Operations Sea Training of all Nigerian Navy ships when assigned. It also conducts harbour and ship acceptance trials of vessels after major refits.
- NNS Quorra at Apapa, which provides various professional courses for officers and ratings.
- Nigerian Naval Engineering College (NNEC) Sapele, which provides technical training for all Nigerian Navy technical personnel.
- The Nigerian Navy Finance and Logistic College at Owerrinta.
- Nigerian Naval College and the Nigerian Navy Basic Training School, which are co-located at Onne, Port Harcourt. The two establishments conduct basic training for officers and ratings respectively.
- Other professional schools, including the Nigerian Navy College of Health Sciences at Offa in Kwara State and the Nigerian Navy School of Music Ota in Ogun State, and the Hydrographic School in Port Harcourt, the Naval Provost and Regulating School in Benue State, the Nigerian Navy School of Armament Technology, Underwater warfare school Navy town ojo, The Nigerian Navy Center of Education Training and Technology and the Physical Training School, both at Apapa, Lagos.

=== Logistics Command ===
The Logistics Command is headed by a Flag Officers Commanding of Rear Admiral rank. The permanent headquarters is at Oghara, Delta State. However, the Nigerian Navy Order establishing the Logistics Command has been released and the command has since started operation. The order stipulates the organization and responsibilities of the command.

=== Autonomous units ===
The autonomous units are those units which require prudent management and high-level control that need not be duplicated or represented at the lower hierarchy. Though small in size, they report directly to the Chief of the Naval Staff. Prominent among the autonomous units is the Nigerian Naval Dockyard, located in Victoria Island, Lagos. Hitherto, third line maintenance had been carried out either in foreign dockyards or private ones in Nigeria, at very high cost. The Naval Dockyard in Lagos, which was commissioned on 27 August 1990, now takes care of high level maintenance, such as major overhaul of ships engines, additions and alterations, and modification of designs. The Naval Shipyard in Port Harcourt was also acquired in 1990 from Messrs Witt and Bush. Smaller ships of the Nigerian Navy and merchant ships are repaired there. The shipyard has built and delivered some tugboats and barges to some private organizations.

=== Nigerian Navy Air Arm ===
The 101 Squadron was established in 1985, based at Navytown, near Ojo. It operated AgustaWestland Lynx helicopters for anti-submarine warfare and search and rescue (SAR) operations from the Meko class frigate NNS Aradu. For quite some time, the Squadron has operated Agusta 109 Helicopters from Warri Naval Base on anti-smuggling and oil protection duties.

=== Special Operations Command ===
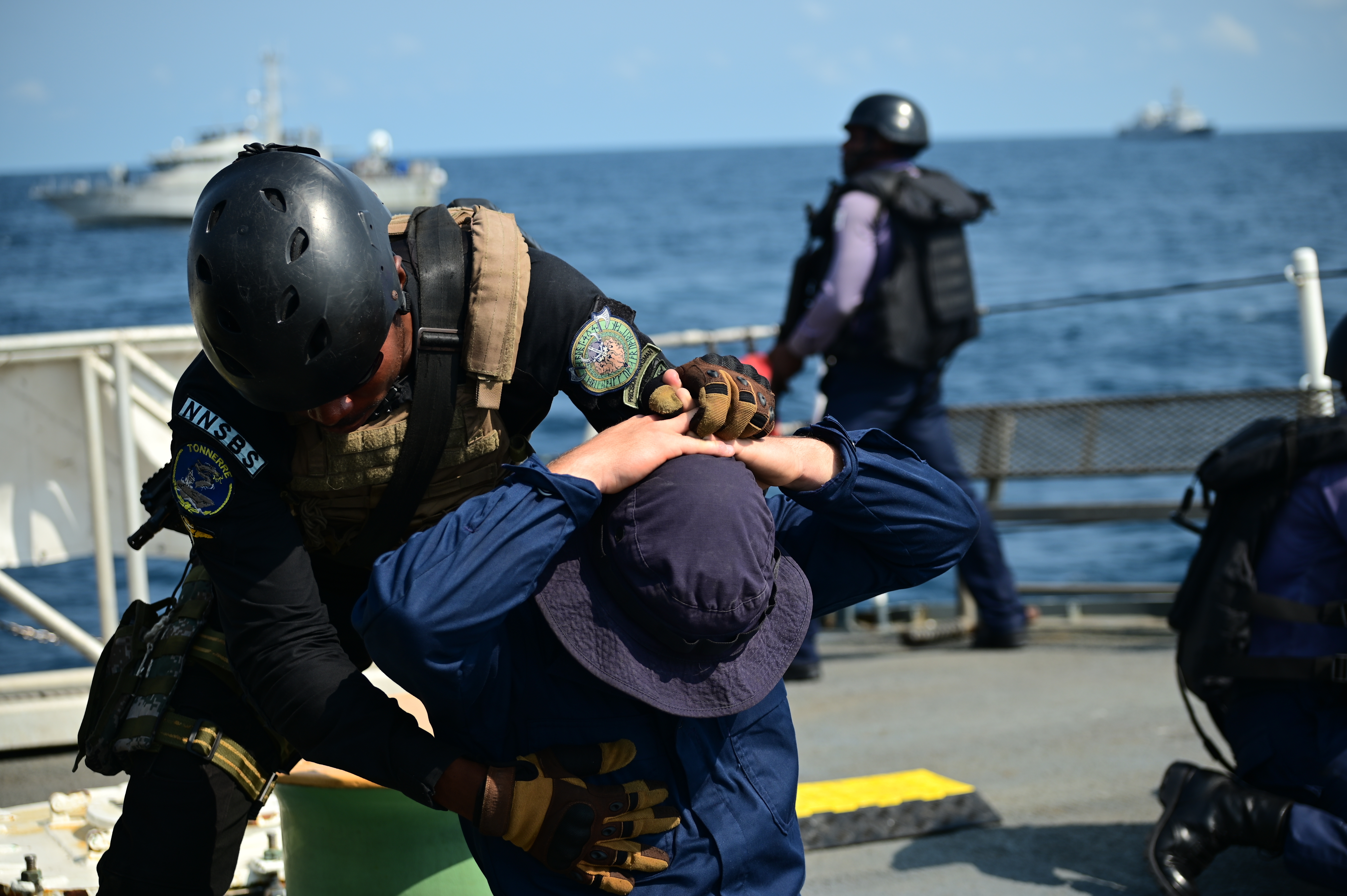

A member of the Nigerian Special Boat Service conducting Visit, Board, Search, and Seizure training with United States Coast Guard personnel.

The Nigerian Navy Special Operations Command was officially unveiled on June 1, 2025, during the Nigerian Navy’s 69th Anniversary Ceremonial Sunset Dinner. The announcement was made by Vice Admiral Emmanuel Ikechukwu Ogalla, Chief of Naval Staff, as part of a broader restructuring initiative aimed at addressing evolving security threats.

NNSOC is designed as a rapid deployment force with advanced capabilities for land-based and maritime operations, focusing on internal security and complementing the efforts of other Nigerian military services and security agencies. The command is situated on the North Bank of the River Benue in Makurdi, Benue State, strategically positioned to bolster security in Nigeria’s Middle Belt region.

==== Special Units ====
- Special Boat Service (SBS)
- Deep Blue Special Intervention Forces
- Nigerian Navy Marines

== Organization on Nigerian Navy ships ==
There are four main departments on Nigerian Navy ships. These are operations, marine engineering, weapon engineering, and logistics. An officer, who is referred to as the head of department, is in charge of each department. He reports directly to the commanding officer on operational matters or through the Executive Officer on all administrative matters. The Executive Officer is the second in command on all naval ships, as well as being the head of the Operations Department on smaller ships. On larger ships the Executive Officer remains the second in command, but the Principal Warfare Officer is the head of the Operations Department. In the ratings cadre, the most senior seaman rating is referred to as the Coxswain. The Coxswain (E.M.T) more like M.P, is responsible for organizing the ratings for work and discipline.

== Nigerian Navy fleet revitalization ==
On 3 September 2018, in an official ceremony held at the Naval Dockyard in Lagos, the Nigerian Navy commissioned six new Ocea fast patrol boats and ten new small boats. The patrol boats include two FPB 110 MKII hulls – Nguru (P 187) and Ekulu (P 188) delivered earlier this year by France's Ocea Shipbuilding company – and four smaller FPB 72 MKII hulls – Shiroro (P 185), Ose (P 186), Gongola (P 189), and Calabar (P 190). All vessels were delivered between late 2017 and April 2018.

The six new Ocea fast patrol boats came on the heels of a Two new Ocea FPB 110 MK II Fast Patrol Boats delivered to the Nigerian Navy. Ocea has previously delivered 7 units of the FPB 72 MK II boats in three batches: three in 2012, one FPB 98 in 2013, two in 2017 and two in January of this year. The FPB 72 and FPB 98 were ordered by the Nigerian Port Authority but handed over to the Nigerian Navy.

In October 2018, Paramount Maritime Holding, a South African-based defense company revealed that the Nigerian Navy has placed an order for 15 new build Rigid Hull Inflatable Boats (RHIB). The order which comprises 8.5 metre and 9.5 metre Guardian fast patrol boats amongst others would also includes training for the Nigerian Navy and maritime personnel.

On 8 September 2018, the Nigerian Maritime Administration and Safety Agency handed over its AgustaWestland AW139 Search and Rescue helicopter to the Nigerian Navy. In December 2019, the Navy ordered 4 Units of ARESA 1700 IPC Inshore Patrol Vessels to the Spanish shipbuilder ARESA SHIPYARD. These units achieve speeds of 40 Knots and can transport up to 18 naval personnel inside is armoured cabin and has been used since his delivery for the protection of strategic facilities along the Nigerian coastal area.

On 10 December 2021, Nigeria's President Muhammadu Buhari commissioned 118 newly acquired ships and boats, including a helicopter, as part of his administration's drive to boost the capacity of the Nigerian Navy.

== Equipment ==
The Nigerian Navy has been undergoing significant modernisation since the beginning of the last decade in response to the criminal activities occurring in its area of responsibility in the Gulf of Guinea. Presently in possession of the Nigerian Navy is a MEKO 360 Type H1 frigate, NNS Aradu, which completed a refit in 2020 and will undergo refurbishment at Dearsan Shipyards in Turkiye. The NNS Aradu will serve as a combat training ship for Nigeria's acquisition of a new light frigate from Dearsan Shipyards. Dearsan Shipyards has also been contracted with the construction of 2x Dearsan OPV 76 and a Tuzla class patrol vessel. Other pending acquisitions of the Nigerian Navy include 3x 46metres patrol vessels from Poly Technologies in China, 1x 35metres Offshore Survey Vessel and from Ocean Shipyards in France, 2x 46metres Seaward Defence boats from Naval Dockyard Limited, Nigeria and a second LST-100 from Damen Shipyards in UAE.

Nigeria's mid- and long-term acquisition plans aim to fill some of these capability gaps. For example, the keel for a Damen LST-100-class landing ship for amphibious operations and force projection has been laid.

=== Frigates ===
Photo	Class	Type	Vessels	Disp.	Origin	Notes
Frigate
	MEKO 360 Type H1	Frigate	NNS Aradu (F89)	3,360 t	Germany	Status: Refitting Refitted in 2020. Will undergo refurbishment in Dearsan Shipyards in Turkey

=== Offshore Patrol Vessels ===
Photo	Class	Type	Vessels	Disp.	Origin	Notes
Offshore Patrol Vessels (4 in active service, 2 under construction)
	Thunder Class	Patrol Frigate	NNS Thunder (F90) NNS Okpabana (F93)	3,250 t	United States	Status: Active Formerly US Coast Guard cutters of the Hamilton-class, transferred to the Nigerian Navy as an excess defense article under the Foreign Assistance Act.
	Centenary Class	Patrol Corvette	NNS Centenary (F91); NNS Unity (F92)	1800 t	China	Status: Active; The Nigerian Navy operates two of the P18N offshore patrol vessel (OPV) variant Armament: 1 x NG-16-1 76mm gun; 2 x H/PJ14 30mm gun
	OPV 76	Offshore Patrol Vessel	NNS Tbd (P203); NNS Tbd (P204)	1100 t	Turkey	Status: Under Construction Armament: 1 x Leonardo 40mm gun; 1 x Aselsan SMASH 30mm RWS gun; 2 x Aselsan STAMP 12.7mm RWS gun; 2 x manned 12.7 mm HMGs

=== Patrol Vessels ===
Photo	Class	Type	Vessels	Disp.	Origin	Notes
Patrol Vessels (31 in active service, 3 under construction)
	Tuzla class	Patrol Boat	NNS Tbd (P205)	410 t	Turkey	Status: Under Construction; To be delivered by Dearsan alongside OPV 76 later this year Armament: 1 x Aselsan SMASH 30mm RWS gun; 2 x Aselsan STAMP 12.7mm RWS gun
	Andoni Class	Patrol Boat	NNS Andoni (P100); NNS Karaduwa (P102); NNS Oji (P275); NNS Tbd; NNS Tbd	200 t	Nigeria	Status: Active Designed and Built by Naval Dockyard Limited for the Nigerian Navy. SDB4 & SDB5 is under construction
	Sagbama Class	Patrol Boat	NNS Sagbama (P184); NNS Ibeno (P199)	170 t	China	Status: Active; Gifted by China Armament: 1 x ZIF-31 57mm gun; 1 x Twin 25mm gun
	Zaria Class	Patrol Boat	NNS Zaria (173); NNS Burutu (174); NNS Faro (P197); NNS Shere (P198)	150 t	Malaysia	Status: Active; 38-meter Sea Eagle built by Malaysian company, KN Aluminium and Engineering and Northern Shipyard
	Chamsuri class	Patrol boat	NNS Ikogosi (P165)	113 t	South Korea	Status: Active; Gifted by South Korea
	Nguru Class	OCEA FPB 110	NNS Nguru (P187); NNS Ekulu (188); NNS Sokoto (193); NNS Aba (194)	110 t	France	Status: Active; 35-meter patrol boats to be built by Ocea SSM
	Dorina Class	Ocea FPB 98 MKII	NNS Dorina (P101); NNS Chalawa (P198); NNS Zur (P199); NNS Lekki (P200)	118 t	France	Status: Active; 32-meter patrol boats to be built by Ocea SSM
	Okpoku Class	Patrol Vessel	NNS Okpoku(P175); NNS Bomadi (P176); NNS Badagry (P177); NNS Shiroro (P185); NNS Ose (P186); NNS Gongola (P189); NNS Calabar (P190); NNS Osun (P191)	120 t	France	24-meter patrol boats to be built by Ocea SSM
	Shaldag class	Patrol Boat	5	72 t	Israel	

=== Minor Surface Vessels ===
Photo	Class	Type	Vessels	Displacement	Origin	Notes
Inshore Patrol Craft
	Manta Class	Patrol Boat	22		Malaysia	Built by Malaysian company, Northern Shipyard
	C-Falcon Class	Fast Interceptor Craft	4		France	P271 & P272 delivered by the end of 2020, P273 & P274 delivered by March 2021
	Aresa 1800 Fighter II	Fast Interceptor Craft	4		Spain	Built by Aresa Shipyard
	Wave Rider class	Patrol Boat	3		Sri Lanka	Built by Naval Boat Building Yard
	Defender-class boat	Rigid-hulled inflatable boat	15		United States	
	Cedric Class	Patrol Boat	9		Sri Lanka	
	Epenal Gunboat	Riverine patrol vessel	30		Nigeria	Designed by and built by Enepal Group
Unmanned Surface Vehicle
	Swift Sea Stalker	USV	2		United States	Status: Active 2 unmanned ships were donated by Swift Ship Company to the Nigerian government. The equipment would be deployed to the Niger Delta, Lake Chad region, and other maritime regions of the country.

=== Amphibious Warfare Vessels ===
Photo	Class	Type	Vessels	Disp.	Origin	Notes
Landing Ship Tank
	LST-100	Landing Ship, Tank	NNS Kada (LST1314)	2800 t	United Arab Emirates	Status: Active; Built by Damen Shipyards, Arrived in Nigeria in 2022

=== Support vessels ===
Photo	Class	Type	Vessels	Disp.	Origin	Notes
Training Vessels (1 in active service)
	Emer class	Training Ship	NNS Prosperity (P167)	1,020 t	Ireland	Status: Active In July 2014, Emer was impounded by the Nigerian Navy, On 19 February 2015, Emer was commissioned into the Nigerian Navy as a training ship
Patrol Vessels (8)
	Argungu class	Patrol Boat	NNS Argungu (P165); NNS Yola (P166); NNS Brass (P169); NNS Epe (P170)		Germany	Status: Doubtful; Some remain in service while others are in storage
	Makurdi class	Patrol Boat	NNS Makurdi (P167); NNS Hadejia (P168); NNS Jebba (P171); NNS Oguta (P172)		United Kingdom	Status: Doubtful; NNS Makurdi remains in service while others are in storage
Minesweepers (2)
	Lerici Class	Minehunter	NNS Ohue (M371); NNS Barama (M372)	635 t	Italy	Status: Active
Support Ships (3 in active service)
	OSV 190	Hydrographic Survey	NNS Lana (A499)	523 t	France	Status: Active; Built by OCEA SSM
	OSV 115	Hydrographic Survey	NNS Zhizoko (A506)	200 t	France	Status: Active; Built by OCEA SSM
	FCS 4008	Fasr Crew Supplier	NNS Ikenne (P269); NNS Kano (P270)	150 t	Netherlands	Status: Active; Built by Damen Shipyard
	Rigid-hulled inflatable boat	RHIBs			United Arab Emirates; South Africa; United States	
Tugboat
		Tugboat	TUG CDR UGWU (A506)	250t	Nigeria	Status: Active; A vessel built by Nigerian engineers at the Navy Dockyard in Lagos and the Naval Shipyard in Port Harcourt
	ASR TUG	Tugboat	TUG Dolphin Rima; TUG Dolphin Mira	300t	Nigeria	Status: Active
Buoy Tender
	Kyanwa Class	Class C Buoy Tender	NNS Kyanwa (A501); NNS Ologbo (A502); NNS Nwamba (A503); NNS Obula (A504)	935 t	United States	Donated by The US Government through the U.S. Security Assistance Program to the Nigerian Navy USCGC Sedge; USCGC Cowslip; USCGC Firebush; USCGC Sassafras

=== Naval Air Wing ===
Photo	Aircraft	Variant	Type	In service	Origin	Notes
Rotary-wing Aircraft
	Westland Lynx	Lynx Mk.89	ASW	3	United Kingdom	
	AgustaWestland AW109	AW109SP GrandNew AW109 Trekker	Light utility helicopter	14	Italy	
	AW139	AW139 SAR	Utility helicopter/SAR	2	Italy	1 AW-139 inducted into service in December 2021
Unmanned Aerial Vehicles
	AR-500B		Rotorcraft UAV	4	China	
	ALTI Transition		UAV	12	South Africa	
	ADS Aerostar		UAV	9	Israel	
	RemoEye 002Bs		UAV		South Korea	Manufactured by South Korea’s Uconsystems
