= NNS Dorina =

NNS Dorina (P101) is a 32-metre (105 ft) OCEA FPB 98 fast patrol craft in service with the Nigerian Navy. She is the lead-vessel of the Dorina class. Her primary duties include coastal patrol and law enforcement along Nigeria's coast and the Gulf of Guinea as well as serving search-and-rescue (SAR) missions when needed.

== Construction ==
She is the first of four French-built OCEAN SSM 32-meter Dorina class vessels bult for the Nigerian Navy. The vessel was constructed and launched in 2013 in St-Nazaire, France and arrived in Nigeria on 25 November 2013. She is powered by twin MTU 12V2000 M84 diesel engines powering dual waterjets for a maximum speed of 30 knots (35 mph). She has a beam of 6.8 metres (22 ft) and a draft of 1.2 metres (3.9 ft), allowing the vessel to operate in Nigeria's littoral waters.

Her main armament consists of one remotely operated 20/90 Super Sea Rogue 20mm cannon as well as mounted 12.7mm machine guns and 7.62mm machine guns as well as assorted small arms carried by the crew. The vessel contains a Furuno FAR-2117 radar system. The vessel has the capacity to carry a small RHIB. She is crewed by 13-14 personnel. The vessel was inducted into the Navy officially in a small ceremony in Lagos.

== Service ==
Since her commissioning in March of 2014, she has been responsible for surveillance, law enforcement, interdiction, and SAR duties in Nigeria's waters. In March of 2020 during a routine patrol, she intercepted a fishing trawler called the Hajiya Binta which had turned off their AIS. She subsequently handed the vessel over the NIMASA for further investigation. On 1 November 2023, she partook in the search and rescue of Cameroon-flagged fishing vessel AFKI. She would locate the missing vessel on the 17th roughly 27 kilometres (17 mi) offshore from the Pennington terminal. Her two foreign crewmen were aided by authorities, and the vessel was towed to shore at Escravos.
