= Special Boat Service (Nigeria) =

Naval special forces unit of Nigeria

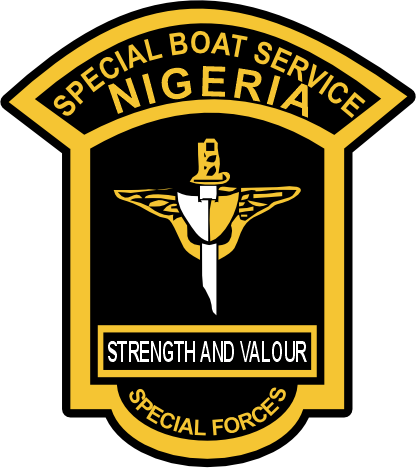
- Active: 2006–present
- Country: Nigeria
- Branch: Nigerian Navy
- Type: Special forces
- Role: Amphibious reconnaissance Amphibious warfare Urban warfare Offensive Action; VBSS; Riverine Operations
- Part of: Special Operations Command
- Garrison/HQ: Navy Town Ojo
- Nickname: Silent Warriors
- Mottos: Strength and Valour
- Engagements: Boko Haram insurgency

Commanders
- Current commander: Captain Andrew Zidon

The Special Boat Service (SBS) is a male only special forces unit of the Nigerian Navy and the maritime special forces unit of the Nigerian Armed Forces. It is modelled after the Royal Navy's Special Boat Service and the United States Navy SEALS. It is considered to be one of the more elite naval special forces units in Africa. It was established in 2006, with its pioneer commander being Rear Admiral Apochi Suleiman.

== Role ==
The establishment of the Nigerian Navy Special Boat Service (SBS) was motivated by the imperative to address the persistent attacks on Nigeria's oil facilities by militant groups and criminal elements in the Niger Delta.

== Training ==
The Basic Operating Course (BOC) is the foundational training program that shapes individuals into skilled SBS operatives, known for their elite capabilities. The course goes on for 9 months and comprises three distinct phases, each focusing on crucial aspects of their operational readiness. Operatives undergo training in range classification, basic hand to hand combat, basic special naval warfare, fast tactical shooting, handling of explosive and demolition weapons, intelligence techniques, map reading and using compass, and SERE. Upon successful completion of the BOC, operatives are bestowed with the special forces honour badge, serving as a symbol of their exceptional training and distinguishing them as elite members within the Naval personnel.

== Operation ==
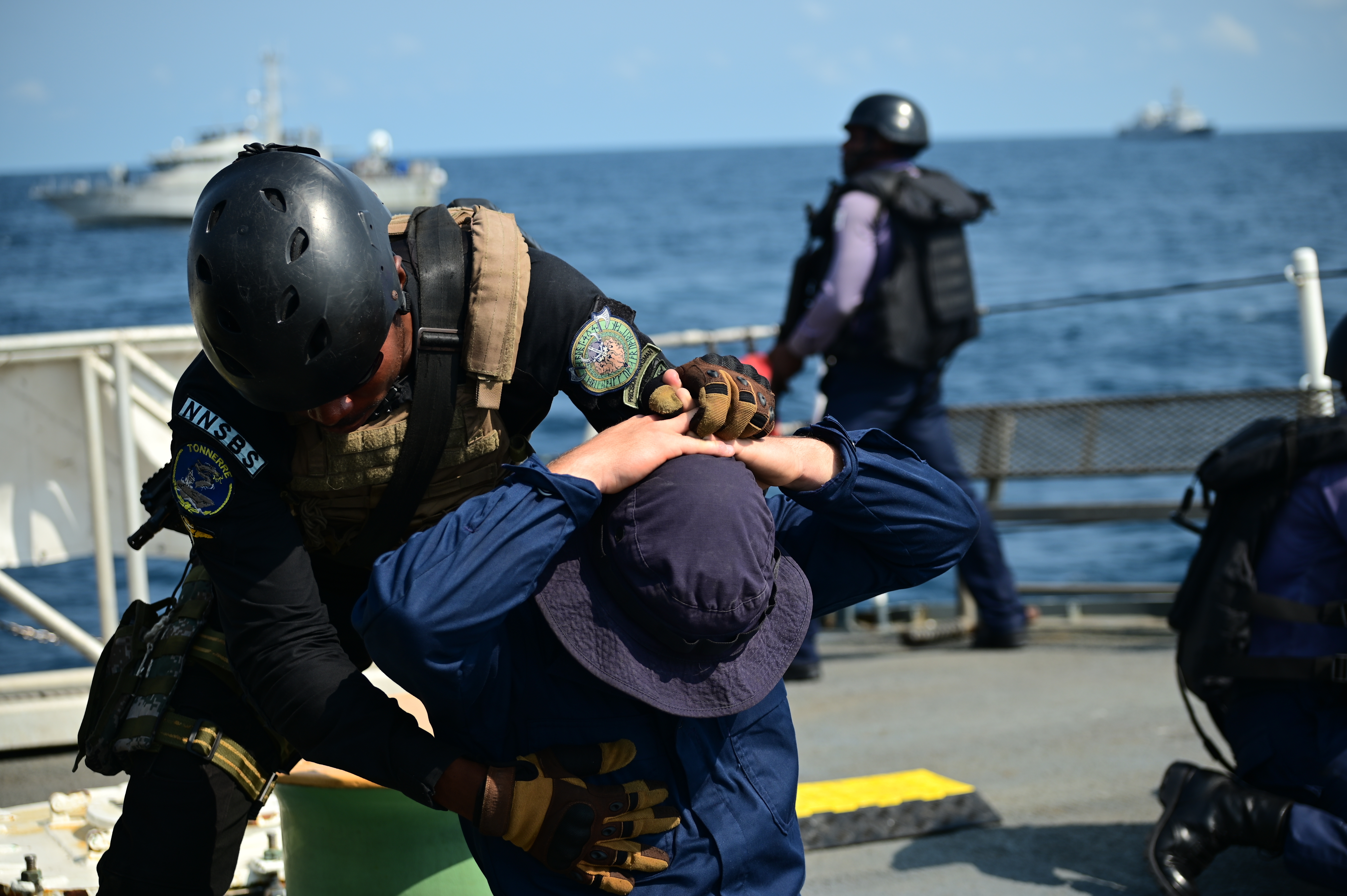
A member of the Nigerian Special Boat Service conducting Visit, Board, Search, and Seizure training with United States Coast Guard personnel.

Presently, some SBS personnel are actively deployed in the northeastern part of Nigeria, working with the Armed Forces Special Forces (AFSF) Battalion, engaging in ongoing counter-insurgency operations against the Boko Haram terrorist group. On 21 April 2020, ten SBS commandos boarded the Tommi Ritscher, a container ship captured by pirates off the shore of Benin, for which the Beninese authorities gave the commandos a letter of commendation. They were instrumental in wiping out Boko Haram high command through surgical operations in the North-East and North-West of the country. They also offered training to Nigerien and Chadian soldiers on tactical operations and weapon handling. The NSBS helped trained the first set of the Special Boat Squadron of Ghana Navy. They were also responsible for capturing the airport and state house in the Gambia that forced president Yaya Germain to handover to Adama Barrow the president-elect.

The Nigerian Navy Special Boat Service has worked in the region with the Ghana Special Boat Squadron and the United States Army Special Forces.

== See also ==
- Nigerian Air Force Regiment
- Nigerian Navy Marines
