= NNS Lana =

NNS Lana (A499) is an offshore hydrographic and oceanographic survey vessel of the Nigerian Navy. The OSV 190-class vessel was built by the French ship builder OCEA and was designed to survey Nigeria's coastal waters and maritime territory while also supporting scientific research, fisheries protection, and search and rescue (SAR) in the Gulf of Guinea and the North Atlantic Ocean.

== Construction and design ==
The vessel was built by OCEA at Les Sables-d'Olonne, France with construction beginning in December 2019. The vessel was launched on September 24, 2020, and handed over to the Nigerian Navy on April 15, 2021. She is 60.1 meters in length with a beam of approximately 8 meters. Her draft is 3.5 meters while displacing roughly 2,000 tonnes. The vessel is powered by two MTU diesel engines as well as three Caterpillar electric generators and an emergency generator. Her electric propulsion system is intended to reduce machinery noise and vibrations that may interfere with hydrographic measurements. She has a top speed of 14 knots and a range of roughly 4,400 nautical miles. The vessel is crewed by up to 50 people, including researchers, international visitors, and military personnel. The vessel has the capability to carry a dedicated shallow-water hydrographic research craft.

The vessel contains extensive research equipment and survey technology. The system features both a Multibeam and Single-beam echosounder as well as side-scan sonar. Researchers utilize both wet and dry labs on the vessel, and can monitor the weather through an automatic weather station. Also included are multiple data processing centers, operating rooms, and scientific and technical workshops to support research. The vessel does not contain a main armament, though the military crew may have small arms aboard the vessel.

== Service ==
The vessel stopped in Lisbon, Portugal and Banjul, The Gambia on the way to Nigeria in April of 2021. In 2021, Nigeria's report to the International Hydrographic Organization identified the ship as central to the planned resumption of national offshore survey work. Also in 2021, she was recognized by Baird Maritime in its "Best Large Research Vessel" awards with OCEA receiving awards for the class design. In 2024, the vessel was featured by Nigeria's National Hydrographic Agency highlighting the vessels' importance to Nigerian marine research and offshore patrol capabilities.
