= NNS Andoni =

Nigerian patrol boat

History

Nigeria
- Namesake: Andoni people
- Launched: 7 June 2012
- Identification: MMSI number: 657714000

General characteristics
- Class & type: Andoni-class seaward defense boat
- Length: 31 m (102 ft)
- Speed: 25 kn (46 km/h; 29 mph)
- Armament: 30 mm (1.2 in) main gun; 2 × SK 12.7 mm (0.50 in); 2 × 40 mm (1.6 in) AGL

NNS Andoni (P-100) is a seaward defense boat of the Nigerian Navy. It is the first of 3 vessels in its class, with each vessel a larger variant of the previous one. Its armament includes a manned 30 mm (1.2 in) main gun, two 12.7 mm (0.50 in) and two 40 mm (1.6 in) AGL. It also has a RHIB embarked.

== History ==
The vessel was conceived as a research and development project by Vice Admiral GTA Adekeye and Rear Admiral GJ Jonah, who were at the time Chief of Naval Staff and Chief of Naval Engineering respectively.

The first Nigerian-built warship, it was named after the Andoni people of south-southern Nigeria.

"We came up with the design, the expertise and about 60% of the materials were locally sourced. The engines, generators and navigation equipment came from outside. This is the beginning of the transformation and I believe in another 10 to 15 years, we can be thinking about starting a project to take Nigerians into the air," said President Goodluck Jonathan.
