= Special Boat Unit =

- Naval Special Operations Command#Units
- Kenyan Special Boat Unit
