= Intercollegiate Horse Shows Association =

Equestrian competition organizer

- Formation: 1967
- Founder: Robert E. Cacchione
- Type: Nonprofit
- Purpose: Collegiate Equestrian Competition

The Intercollegiate Horse Shows Association (IHSA) is a nonprofit organization composed of men and women of all riding levels and offers both individual and team competition. Members of the IHSA participate in horse shows. Students compete at eight levels, from beginner through advanced, with horses provided to them. The organisation was founded by Bob Cacchione in 1967 and currently has +10,000 members in 47 U.S. states and Canada. 400 colleges and universities participate in the program, where college and university team participation is represented through varsity athletics, academic departments and club sports.

An estimated 250,000 people have participated in the IHSA and contributes a significant percentage of membership to the U.S. Hunter Jumper Association (USHJA), the U.S. Equestrian Federation (USEF), the American Quarter Horse Association (AQHA) and the National Reining Horse Association (NRHA).

== Divisions ==
Within the IHSA, riders compete as individuals and teams in English riding (hunter seat equitation, aka, 'flat,' and over fences) or Western riding (Western horsemanship and reining). There are eight hunter seat levels total of nine classes including Introductory, Pre-Novice, Novice, Limit on the flat and over fences, Intermediate on the flat and over fences, and Open on the flat and over fences. Alumni on the flat and Alumni over fences may be offered.

For the Hunter Seat divisions, over fences, the Limit division jumps are set at 2’ to 2’3”, Intermediate jumps at 2’6” to 2’9” and Open jumps at 2’9” to 3’.

In Western Horsemanship, there are six levels: Beginner Western Horsemanship, Rookie A and B, Novice, Level I, Level II, Open and Open Reining. Alumni Horsemanship may be offered.

== Judging ==
In both Hunter Seat and Western divisions, riders are judged on their equitation, i.e., each rider is individually judged on their effectiveness in communicating with their horse, while maintaining proper form.

Individual ribbons correspond to points, which combine for a team score. Each team can have only one 'point rider' per division and the lowest score on their card is dropped. A cumulative team score of 49 points for Hunter Seat or 42 points for Western would be a 'perfect' card. A rider may only score a given number of points before they graduate to another level of riding experience. Points correspond as follows:

General Points Awarded through the Zone/Semi-Final Level:

Placing	Point Value
1st	7
2nd	5
3rd	4
4th	3
5th	2
6th	1

Nationals Points Points will be counted as follows:

Placing	Point Value
1st	10
2nd	8
3rd	7
4th	6
5th	5
6th	4
7th	3
8th	2
9th	1
10th	1/2

== Competition ==
The IHSA divides the country into eight zones. Every zone is divided into regions, and each region ranges with approximately five to 15 collegiate teams. The teams within the region compete against each other in two to ten horse shows per year.

An IHSA team organizes and hosts each show and invites other member colleges in its IHSA Region to compete. Competitors are not permitted to ride their own horses. IHSA show horses are provided by host stables or "donated" for the day from other teams, coaches, or area equestrian facilities. Each horse is warmed-up before classes begin by non-competing riders, while student competitors observe. Each rider is assigned a horse, through random selection, called the "draw" and partially through a matching of the horse's abilities with those needed for horses participating in certain classes. Riders are not permitted to warm up their assigned horse except at the walk.

Each place (first through sixth) has an assigned point value that accumulates throughout the seasons. When riders acquire 36 (or 28 for Open) points in their division, they qualify to compete in the Regional Finals competition. The top two riders in each class move to the Zone Finals and the top riders from Zones move on to Nationals. The high-point team (and in some zones, the top two teams) from each region also compete in Zones for the National Competition. At Nationals, both Hunter Seat and Western teams compete.

Once a rider has qualified for IHSA Regionals in a division, they must compete the rest of the year in the next division. The one exception are Introductory and Beginner divisions. A rider is only allowed to remain in the Introductory or Beginner division for two years before moving up to the next division.

== Zones ==
Zone	State
Zone 1	Maine New Hampshire Vermont Massachusetts Rhode Island
Zone 2	Eastern Ontario, Canada Northern New York Connecticut
Zone 3	Southern New York Northern New Jersey Eastern Pennsylvania
Zone 4	Southern New Jersey Southern Pennsylvania Maryland Delaware Eastern Virginia Eastern North Carolina
Zone 5	Western Kentucky Tennessee Western North Carolina South Carolina Georgia Florida Alabama Arkansas
Zone 6	Southern Ontario, Canada Michigan Ohio Western Pennsylvania Eastern Kentucky West Virginia
Zone 7	North Dakota South Dakota Minnesota Wisconsin Western Michigan Iowa Illinois Indiana Kansas Missouri Oklahoma Texas Louisiana
Zone 8	California Washington Oregon British Columbia, Canada Nevada Idaho Montana Wyoming Colorado Nebraska Utah Arizona New Mexico Northwestern Oklahoma Western Kansas

== Alumni and awards ==
Its USEF/Cacchione Cup stars include U.S. Olympic Show Jumping medalists Greg Best, Beezie Madden, Peter Wylde, and U.S. Combined Training champion Mark Weissbecker.

The IHSA's founder, Robert E. Cacchione, was awarded the IHSA Lifetime Achievement Award, the USHJA Presidents Distinguished Service Award, the 2011 US Equestrian/EQUUS Foundation Humanitarian Award, a Doctor of Humane Letters from Centenary College and the Zoetis/American Horse Publications Equine Industry Vision Award.

The IHSA official Facebook Page was recognized by the Equestrian Social Media Awards as a finalist and for the FEI Solidarity Award.

== See also ==
- OUEA
