= Almirante Brown-class destroyer =

Class of Argentine warships

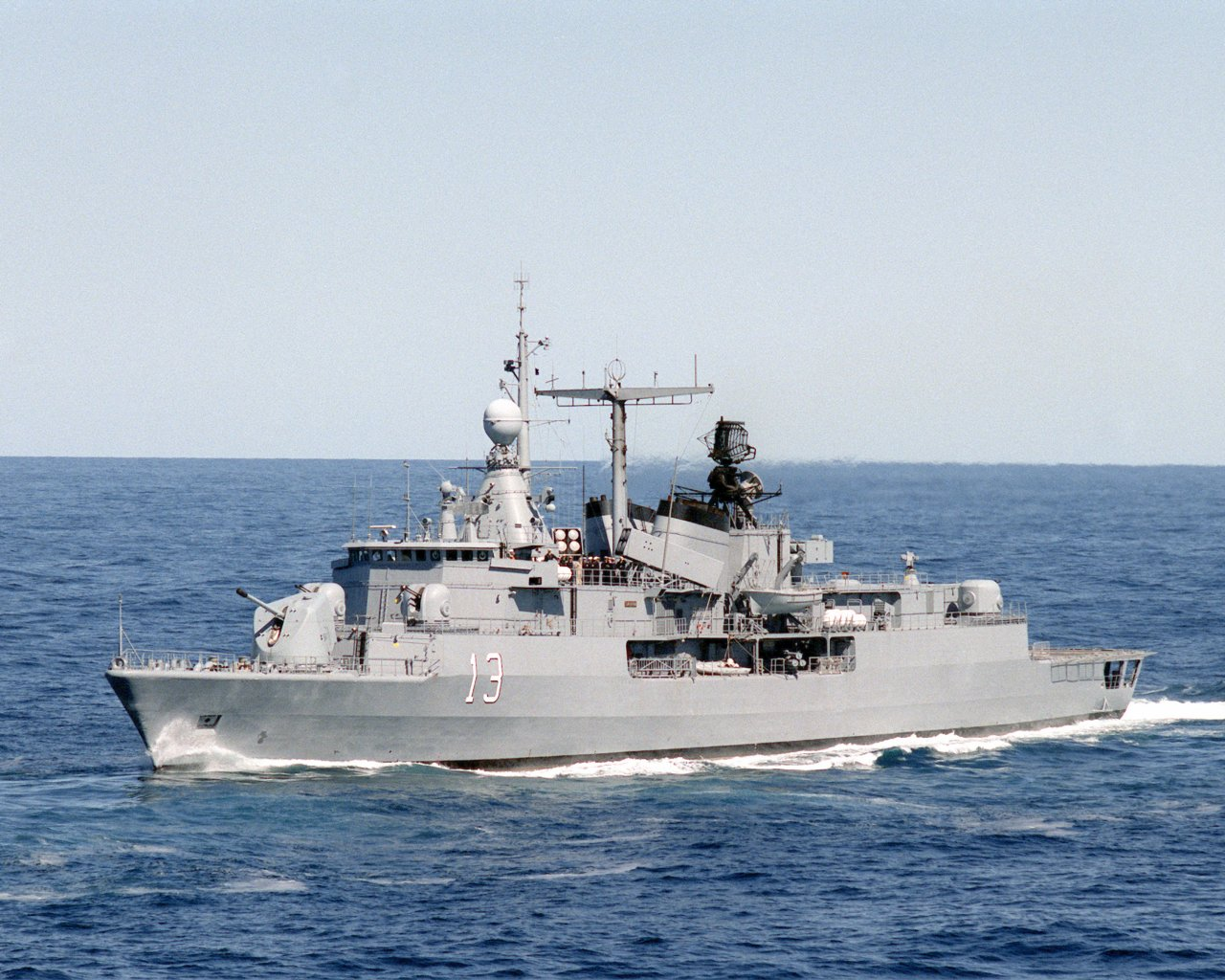
- ARA Sarandí in 1990

Class overview
- Name: Almirante Brown class
- Builders: Blohm+Voss
- Operators: Argentine Navy
- Preceded by: Hércules class
- Built: 1980–1984
- In service: 1983–present
- Planned: 6
- Completed: 4
- Cancelled: 2
- Active: 3
- Retired: 1

General characteristics
- Type: MEKO 360H2 destroyer
- Displacement: 2,900 long tons (2,900 t) standard; 3,360 long tons (3,410 t) fully loaded
- Length: 125.9 m (413 ft 1 in) oa; 119.0 m (390 ft 5 in) pp
- Beam: 15 m (49 ft 3 in)
- Draught: 5.8 m (19 ft 0 in)
- Propulsion: 2-shaft COGAG; 2 × Olympus TM 3B gas turbines, 51,800 shp (38,600 kW); 2 × Tyne RM-IC gas turbines, 10,200 shp (7,600 kW)
- Speed: 30.5 knots (56.5 km/h; 35.1 mph)
- Range: 4,500 nmi (8,300 km; 5,200 mi) at 18 knots (33 km/h; 21 mph)
- Complement: 200
- Armament: 2 × quad launchers for 8 Exocet MM-40 anti-ship missiles; 1 × octuple launcher for 24 Aspide surface-to-air missiles; 1 × 5 in (127 mm) Oto Melara Otobreda 127/54 Compact dual purpose gun; 4 × twin 40 mm anti-aircraft guns; 2 × triple 324 mm (13 in) torpedo tubes
- Aircraft carried: 1 helicopter
- Aviation facilities: Helicopter deck and hangar

The Almirante Brown class is a class (MEKO 360H2 type) of warships built for the Argentine Navy. They were commissioned between 1983 and 1984, after the Falklands War. The class comprised four ships; Almirante Brown, La Argentina, Heroína and Sarandí. Heronia was retired in 2024 after a period of prolonged inactivity.

The ships are classified as either frigates or destroyers by different publications. The MEKO 360 type warships are based on modular designs which allow quick changes to the vessel's armaments depending on mission requirements. The modular nature of the construction also allows the ships to be modernized or refitted with greater ease. Six vessels were initially ordered, however two ships were cancelled and replaced with orders for MEKO 140 type hulls.

Ordered in 1979, construction of the ships was delayed as the British turbines were embargoed after the Falklands War. Furthermore, the acquisition of helicopters for the vessels has seen many incarnations. They were initially intended to be equipped with Westland Lynx helicopters, but the order was cancelled in 1982. The planned replacement Agusta-Bell AB 212 helicopters were not funded and instead, all of the Almirante Brown class deploy with AS 555 Fennec, while only La Argentina and Sarandí can employ SH-3D Sea King helicopters. Almirante Brown took part in Gulf War operations in 1990. All of the ships can be used as flagships.

== Design and description ==
Six vessels were ordered and four vessels of a second variant, MEKO 360H2, were constructed for Argentina. They were locally named the Almirante Brown class. They are considered frigates and destroyers by different publications. The design is based on the concept of modular systems and is capable of changing the armament of the ship swiftly and can be modernized/refitted with more ease. Each ship is capable of being used as a flagship.

The ships have a standard displacement of 2,900 long tons (2,900 t) and 3,360 long tons (3,410 t) at full load. The vessels are 125.9 metres (413 ft 1 in) long overall and 119.0 metres (390 ft 5 in) between perpendiculars with a beam of 15 metres (49 ft 3 in) and a draught of 5.8 metres (19 ft 0 in). The vessels are powered by a COGOG system driving two shafts composed of two Olympus TM 3B gas turbines rated at 51,800 shaft horsepower (38,600 kW) and two Tyne RM-IC gas turbines rated at 10,200 shaft horsepower (7,600 kW). The ships have a maximum speed of 30.5 knots (56.5 km/h; 35.1 mph) while using their Olympus gas turbines at 18 knots (33 km/h; 21 mph) using their Tyne turbines. The MEKOs have a maximum range of 4,500 nautical miles (8,300 km; 5,200 mi) at 18 knots.

The Argentinian vessels are armed with eight Exocet MM-40 surface-to-surface missiles in two quad launchers mounted centrally and one octuple launcher for Aspide surface-to-air missiles mounted aft of the superstructure. The MEKO 360H2 are also equipped with one OTO Melara 5-inch (127 mm)/54 calibre naval gun forward of the superstructure, 4 OTO Melara Twin 40L70 DARDO compact gun guns, and two triple-mounted 324 mm (13 in) ILAS torpedo tubes.

The ships are equipped with a Graseby G1738 towed decoy countermeasure system, two Breda 105 mm (4 in) SCLAR chaff rocket launchers with each launcher sporting 20 tubes. For electronic support measures, the vessels are armed with the Sphinx system and the Scimitar system for electronic countermeasures. The class is equipped with two Signaal DA08A air/surface search radar operating on the F band and Signaal ZW06 surface search radar operating on I band. They have Decca 1226 navigational radar operating on the I band and their fire control systems are controlled by the Signaal SEWACO Link 10/11 system supported by Signaal STIR radar operating on the I/J and K bands, Signaal WM25 operating on I and J band, along with LIRODA radar systems that control the 40 mm gun mounts. For sub-surface search, the vessels have Atlas Elektronik 80 hull-mounted active search sonar.

All of the Almirante Brown class are equipped with a helicopter deck and hangar. They all deploy with AS 555 Fennec helicopters, while only La Argentina and Sarandí can employ SH-3D Sea King helicopters. The ships have a complement of 200, including 26 officers.

== Ships ==
Almirante Brown class construction data
Name	Number	Shipyard	Laid down	Launched	Commissioned	Status
Almirante Brown	D-10	Blohm+Voss, Hamburg, Germany	8 September 1980	28 March 1981	26 January 1983	In service
La Argentina	D-11	Blohm+Voss, Hamburg, Germany	30 March 1981	25 September 1981	4 May 1983	In service
Heroína	D-12	Blohm+Voss, Hamburg, Germany	24 August 1981	17 February 1982	31 October 1983	Decommissioned 2024
Sarandí	D-13	Blohm+Voss, Hamburg, Germany	9 March 1982	31 August 1982	16 April 1984	In service
Rivadavia	D-14	Blohm+Voss, Hamburg, Germany	Cancelled			
Moreno	D-15	Blohm+Voss, Hamburg, Germany	Cancelled			

== Construction and career ==
Initially, six vessels were ordered, but this was later reduced to four after an order for six MEKO 140 type ships was placed. All four vessels were constructed at the Blohm+Voss shipyard in Hamburg, Germany. However, construction was delayed during the Falklands War as the British-built gas turbines were placed under embargo. The class was intended for anti-submarine warfare (ASW) and an initial order for Westland Lynx helicopters was made to complement the ships. The order was cancelled in 1982 and a planned replacement, the Agusta-Bell AB 212 helicopters, was not financed. Until the delivery of the AS 555 Fennec helicopters in 1996, the Argentinian Navy used Aérospatiale Alouette SA 319 helicopters aboard the ships. The first ship, Almirante Brown entered service in 1983 and the fourth and last, Sarandí in 1984. Almirante Brown took part in Gulf War operations in the Persian Gulf in 1990.

In 2006, La Argentina completed a two-year refit which included extensions to the flight deck to accommodate the Sea King helicopters. Sarandí underwent a similar refit in 2008–2010. The four vessels form the 2nd Destroyer Squadron, based at Puerto Belgrano Naval Base. The Argentine Navy struggles to meet maintenance and training requirements because of financial problems and import restrictions. The Almirante Brown class were reported to be short of spares and suffering engine problems. In addition it has been reported that the ordinance for the ships is past its expiration date. As of 2020, work was reportedly underway to maintain the operational relevance of both the aging Exocet and Aspide systems.

== See also ==
- List of destroyer classes in service

=== Equivalent destroyers of the same era ===
- Hatsuyuki class
- Kidd class
- Rajput class
- Type 051D
- Udaloy class

== Bibliography ==
- Saunders, Stephen, ed. (2009). Jane's Fighting Ships 2009–2010 (112 ed.). Alexandria, Virginia: Jane's Information Group Inc. ISBN 978-0-7106-2888-6.
- Scheina, Robert L. & Smigielski, Adam (1995). "Argentina". In Chumbley, Stephen (ed.). Conway's All the World's Fighting Ships, 1947–1995 (revised ed.). Naval Institute Press. pp. 3–12. ISBN 1-55750-132-7.
