= OUEA =

The Ontario Collegiate Equestrian Association (OCEA) is a university equestrian league in the province of Ontario, Canada. It was developed to give Ontario post-secondary students an opportunity to participate in equestrian sports while continuing their education. The OCEA welcomes riders of all skill levels, offering hunter seat equitation classes from beginner to advanced riders. The OCEA is team-focused, but allows for personal growth and learning. It allows any post-secondary student to participate in horse shows regardless of the rider's beginning skill level, financial status, or past riding experience. Both men and women are eligible to compete. There are 18 participating universities. Two colleges, Cambrian College and Georgian College, joined for the 2016–2017 season. The league was modelled after the American IHSA.

== Competition ==
Riders compete in Hunter Seat Equitation. There are 4 different levels of competition: Entry, Novice, Intermediate, and Open. All riders compete both on the flat and over fences. Unlike the majority of equestrian competitions, it is a "catch ride" where riders generally have not ridden their horse before entering the ring. Horses are donated by the show hosts and assigned randomly by a draw. Competitors watch as their horses are schooled by experienced volunteers and then mount their horse for competition. Each member school is responsible for hosting one horse show per year.

== Schools ==
Currently, 17 universities and two colleges in Ontario as well as one Quebec university have participating teams. They are divided into three zones according to geographic proximity.

East Zone:

- Carleton University, Ottawa
- McGill University, Montreal
- Queen's University, Kingston
- Trent University, Peterborough
- University of Ottawa, Ottawa
- University of Ontario Institute of Technology, Oshawa

Central Zone:

- Georgian College, Barrie
- Lakehead University, Thunder Bay
- Laurentian University and Cambrian College, Sudbury
- Toronto Metropolitan University, Toronto
- York University, Toronto
- University of Guelph, Guelph
- University of Toronto, Toronto

West Zone:

- Brock University, St. Catharines
- McMaster University, Hamilton
- University of Waterloo, Waterloo
- University of Western Ontario, London
- University of Windsor, Windsor
- Wilfrid Laurier University, Waterloo

== Divisions ==
There are four divisions, each with an over fences and under saddle class. Riders in the Open division compete over a course of jumps set at 3', while Intermediate competes at 2'6", Novice 2'3" and Entry 18". Divisions are based upon ability and experience to allow riders compete against people of similar skill levels. Generally, the division qualifications are as follows:

Open: winning three first place ribbons in an equitation over fences at a height of 3'3", or placing six times in an equitation, hunter over fences, or jumper class at a height of 3'6".

Intermediate: winning three first place ribbons in an equitation over fences at a height of 2'9", or placing six times in an equitation, hunter over fences, or jumper class at a height of 3'.

Novice: winning three first place ribbons in an equitation over fences at a height of 2'6", or placing six times in an equitation, hunter over fences, or jumper class at a height of 2'9".

Entry: being part of a lesson program, where the rider has been jumping a height of 2' or higher for at least four months.

== Judging ==
Riders are judged on their equitation, meaning that each rider is individually judged on his or her effectiveness as a rider, ability to look aesthically pleasing (i.e. posture and positioning on the horse), and ability to make riding a horse seem easy and effortless.

Individual ribbons correspond to points, which combine for a team score. Teams receive points from their highest place rider in a given class. Riders who win three first place ribbons over fences in a season must move up a division the following season.

Points are awarded as follows:

- 1st place: 8 points
- 2nd place: 7 points
- 3rd place: 6 points
- 4th place: 5 points
- 5th place: 4 points
- 6th place: 3 point
- 7th place: 2 point
- 8th place: 1 point

Each show names a high point rider, high point school, and division grand and reserve champions for each division. Spirit awards and sportsmanship awards are awarded at the discretion of the host school.

== Finals and Banquet ==
The season ends with Finals, where riders from all three zones compete against each other. The top 6 or 7 riders from each zone qualify separately in the over fences and under saddle classes to compete at Finals. At Finals, four riders ride one of five horses in the over fences portion. The rider on each horse with the highest score is called back for a short workoff, where all five callback riders ride the same new horse. The top five riders in the under saddle classes also perform a short workoff test on the flat.

Points awarded at Finals are counted towards zone year-end awards, which are presented at the Awards Banquet the day following Finals. The top 8 riders in each division from each zone are awarded, as well as the Zone high-point and reserve high-point rider. Teams are awarded Zone high-point or reserve high-point and the team with the most points across all three zones is awarded the provincial championship.

== Name change ==
In 2017, the organization announced its official change of name to become the Ontario Collegiate Equestrian Association (OCEA). This change was intended to reflect the association's diversified school involvement with both universities and colleges.

The association was formerly known as the Ontario University Equestrian Association (OUEA)
