= NNS Karaduwa =

History

Nigeria
- Name: Karaduwa
- Namesake: Karaduwa
- Builder: Naval Dockyard Limited
- Commissioned: 15 December 2016
- Identification: Hull number: P102
- Motto: "Search for Victory"

General characteristics
- Class & type: Seaward Defense Boat (SDB)
- Length: Approx 40 m (131 ft 3 in)
- Speed: 39 knots (72 km/h; 45 mph)
- Armament: 1 × 30 mm RWS; 2 × 12.5 mm (0.49 in) HMG; 2 × 40 mm (1.6 in) grenade launchers

NNS Karaduwa (P102) is a Nigerian made 40-metre (130 ft) Seaward Defense Boat constructed for the Nigerian Navy in collaboration with Dorman Long Engineering which carried out most of the fabrication while instrumentation was carried out by Blueflag Inc.

== History ==
The Karaduwa SDB II fulfilled the Nigerian government's long aspiration of building, equipping and maintaining its own naval fleet without relying on external assistance.

The 30 mm main gun is remotely operated. Karaduwa is used in the volatile Niger Delta region to combat piracy and to show the flag.

A new 50-metre (160 ft) Seaward defense boat III is being built in 2017–2018 under construction. It will be an enlarged version of the SDB II with more powerful weapons systems.

=== Overview ===
NNS Karaduwa is a 40-meter (130 ft) naval vessel categorized as a Seaward Defense Boat (SDB), a term used to describe a boat capable of operating from the littoral coastal waters down towards the deeper seas. In summary, it is a mid-shore patrol boat something short of a deep ocean-going ship but more capable than a coastal patrol boat. It is about 38.9 m (127 ft 7 in) long and has a top speed of 39 knots (72 km/h; 45 mph).

The vessel is fitted with a 30 mm remotely operated gun, two 12.5 mm (0.49 in) multi-purpose heavy machine guns and a 40 mm grenade launcher for taking out hostile speed boats. Karaduwa is currently deployed in the volatile Niger Delta region enforcing the federal government maritime security mandate and showing the flag.

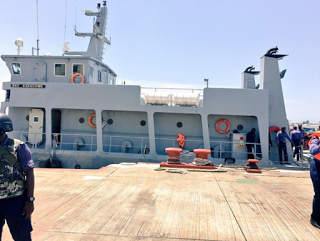
NNS Karaduwa's flank side
