= Nigerian Air Force Regiment =

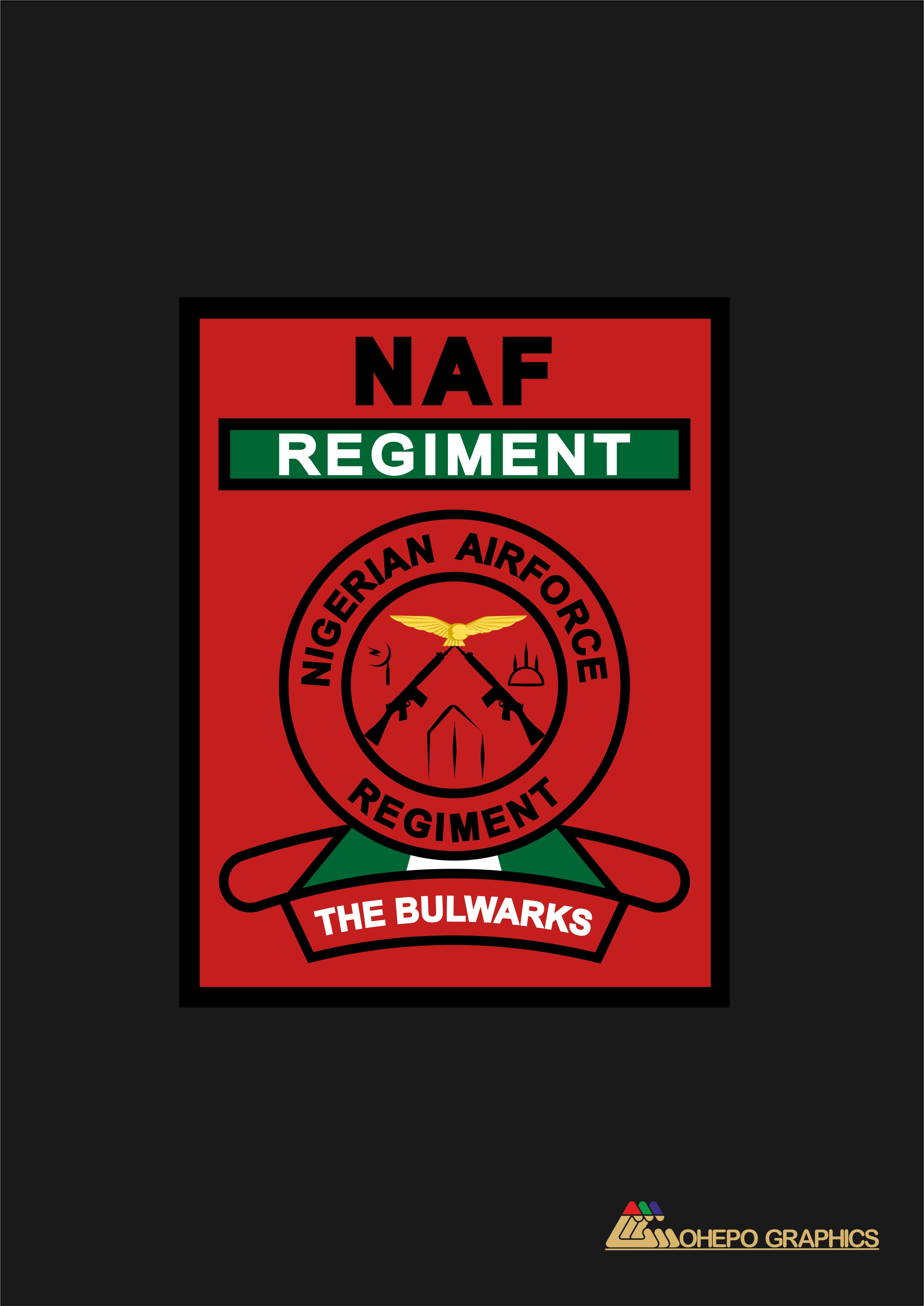
- Active: 2015 – present
- Country: Nigeria
- Branch: Nigerian Air Force
- Type: Air force ground force, Special operations forces
- Role: Force protection; Direct Action; Special operations, Reconnaissance Air assault Counterinsurgency
- Part of: NAF Special Operations Command
- Nicknames: "The Bulwarks"; "Panthers"
- Engagements: Conflict in the Niger Delta; Boko Haram insurgency; Nigerian bandit conflict; Insurgency in Southeastern Nigeria

Commanders
- Director of Regiment (DOREGT): Air Commodore I Subi

The Nigerian Air Force Regiment (NAF Regiment) is a component of the Nigerian Air Force that serves as a specialist airfield and defense corps. The NAF Regiment is divided into two elements, a force protection element and also the special operations element.

== History ==
=== Background ===
In December 2013, Boko Haram militants launched a coordinated assault on the NAF base in Maiduguri. Reports indicated that the attackers arrived in approximately 15 to 20 vehicles, each equipped with multiple rocket launchers, and were armed with assault rifles. This well-organized attack resulted in significant damage to the base. Two helicopters and three decommissioned military aircraft were destroyed during the attack which had been repelled.

In response to such threats, the NAF recognized the necessity for a dedicated force capable of defending its installations. Consequently, the NAF Regiment was established to provide specialized protection for air bases, aircraft, and personnel, particularly in conflict zones like the Northeast of Nigeria.

== Operations ==
They serve to defend NAF bases, airfields and aircraft as well as protect VIPs. After the attacks by Boko Haram on Nigerian Air Force installations during their insurgency, the command decided to create a specialist unit capable of providing security and protecting the Air Force interests and its bases across the country, in especially conflict zones like the North East, Maiduguri. The regiment is currently operating in internal security operations in 14 states. In early 2021, seven NAF Regiment servicemen died in an ambush by 100 terrorists in Kaduna State.

== Organization ==
- VIP Protection Squad
- Special Operations Force
- Regiment Training Centre
- Quick Response Force (QRF)

=== Quick Response Force ===
The Quick Response Force (QRF) is a unit in the regiment capable of the quick deployment of its forces to provide counter-terrorism and security for various Nigerian Air Force installations, such as bases, military assets from which the Air Force operates from. These security forces consist of elite military units such as special operations or paratroopers which are trained at a higher combat level than the regular military units.

== Training ==
Its training and nature of operations are equivalent to the RAF Regiment of Great Britain, the training was undertaken by the British Military Advisory and Training Team (BMATT). They also train in various countries such as Belarus, China and Pakistan.
