= ARA Heroína (D-12) =

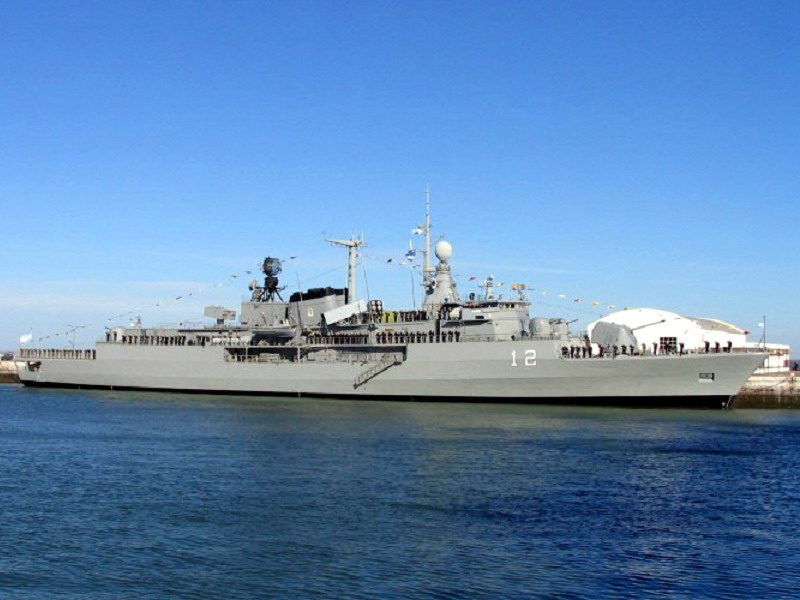
- ARA Heroína

History

Argentina
- Name: Heroína
- Builder: Blohm + Voss Shipyards, Hamburg, West Germany
- Launched: 17 February 1982
- Commissioned: October 1983
- Out of service: Spring 2024
- Status: Decommissioned

General characteristics
- Class & type: Almirante Brown-class destroyer
- Displacement: 3,360 tons
- Length: 126 m (413 ft 5 in)
- Beam: 14 m (45 ft 11 in)
- Draught: 5.8 m (19 ft 0 in)
- Propulsion: COGAG (4 turbines); 36,000 shp (27,000 kW)
- Speed: 30.5 knots (56.5 km/h; 35.1 mph)
- Range: 4,500 mi (7,200 km)
- Complement: 224
- Armament: 8 × Aérospatiale MM40 Exocet anti-ship missiles; 1 × Selenia/Elsag Albatross octuple launcher with 24 Aspide SAMs; 1 × Oto Melara 127 mm (5.0 in) dual purpose gun; 8 × Bofors 40 mm (1.6 in) L/70 AA guns (4 × twin); 6 × 324 mm (12.8 in) torpedo tubes (2 × 3)
- Aircraft carried: 1 Aérospatiale AS 555 Fennec helicopter
- Aviation facilities: Single hangar

ARA Heroína (pennant number D-12) was the third ship of the MEKO 360H2 series of four destroyers built for the Argentine Navy. The ship was the third ship in the history of the Argentine Navy to bear the name of the corsair frigate Heroína, which claimed the Falkland Islands for the United Provinces of the River Plate on 6 November 1820.

The Argentine Navy has struggled to meet maintenance and training requirements because of financial problems and import restrictions. In the early 2010s it was reported that the Almirante Brown class were short of spares, suffering engine problems and ordnance, at that time, was past its expiry date. Heronia herself had a prolonged period of inactivity and she was formally taken out of service in early 2024.

== Construction and career ==
Heroína and her sister ships were authorized under the Naval Construction National Plan of 1974, an initiative by the Argentine Navy to replace old World War II-vintage warships which were nearing the end of their operational lives. A contract was signed with the Blohm + Voss Shipyards in Hamburg, West Germany for the construction of four MEKO 360H2 destroyers.

Heroína was launched on 17 February 1982. The ship was delivered to the Argentine Navy on 7 November 1983, for her sea trials, following which the ship departed for Argentina, arriving at Puerto Belgrano Naval Base on 21 December.

Heroína was scheduled a major engine and structural overhaul in 2008, after being severely damaged due to a collision with a whale. She was homeported at Puerto Belgrano as part of the Navy's 2nd Destroyer Division, along with her three sister ships. As of 2021, she was reported to have sat idle for more than a decade and was still awaiting a key component that, shortsightedly, had been sent to the United Kingdom for repair. British authorities then seized the components leaving the vessel inoperable. She was formally retired in 2024 after prolonged inactivity, with the Argentine Navy having indicated as early as 2019 that the vessel was intended to be scrapped.
